= 1610s =

Decade

The 1610s decade ran from January 1, 1610, to December 31, 1619.

== Events ==
=== 1610 ===
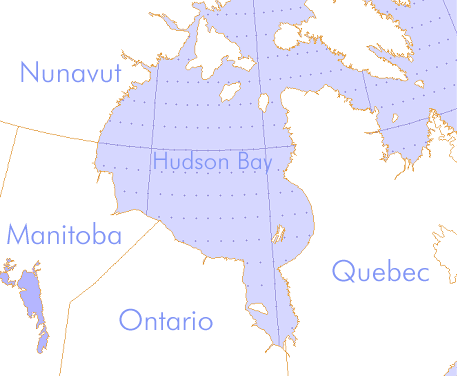
August 2: Henry Hudson sails into Hudson Bay.

==== January–March ====
- January 6 – Nossa Senhora da Graça incident: A Portuguese carrack sinks near Nagasaki, after fighting Japanese samurai for four nights.
- January 7 – Galileo Galilei first observes the four Galilean moons of Jupiter: Ganymede, Callisto, Europa and Io, but is unable to distinguish the latter two until the following day.
- February 24 – English courtier Thomas Roe sets out on an expedition to The Guianas and Amazon River.
- March 13 – Galileo Galilei's treatise on astronomy, Sidereus Nuncius, the first printed scientific record of observations through a telescope, is first published.
- March 22 (March 12 O.S.) – Mikhail Skopin-Shuisky, nephew of the Tsar Vasili, liberates Moscow from rebels.

==== April–June ====
- April 10 – The Treaty of Brussol is signed between Charles Emmanuel I, Duke of Savoy, and a representative of King Henry IV of France, at a meeting at Bruzolo near Turin. The agreement for France and Savoy to remove Spanish occupiers from Italy, is never carried out because King Henry is assassinated one month later.
- April 20 – William Shakespeare's play, The Tragedie of Macbeth, is given its first performance, staged at the Globe Theatre in London.
- May 13 – A formal coronation is held for Marie de' Medici, wife of King Henry IV, as Queen Consort of France. King Henry is preparing to depart to Germany to participate in the War of the Jülich Succession.
- May 14 – King Henry IV of France is assassinated in Paris by François Ravaillac, a French Catholic activist who resents the Protestant monarch's decision to launch a war against the Catholic Spanish Netherlands. Ravaillac rushes up to a horse-drawn carriage and stabs King Henry in the chest. Henry's 8-year-old son becomes King Louis XIII, with Henry's widow, Marie de' Medici, governing France as queen regent.
- May 23 – Jamestown, Virginia: Acting as temporary Governor, Thomas Gates, along with John Rolfe, Captain Ralph Hamor, Sir George Somers, and other survivors from the Sea Venture (wrecked at Bermuda) arrive at Jamestown; they find that 60 have survived the "starving time" (winter), the fort palisades and gates have been torn down, and empty houses have been used for firewood, in fear of attacks by natives outside the fort area.
- May 24 – Jamestown, Virginia: The temporary Governor, Thomas Gates, issues The Divine, Moral, and Martial Laws.
- May 27 – Regicide François Ravaillac is executed by being pulled apart by horses in the Place de Grève, Paris.
- June 5 – The masque Tethys' Festival is performed at Whitehall Palace to celebrate the investiture of Henry Frederick, Prince of Wales.
- June 7 – Jamestown: Temporary Governor Gates decides to abandon Jamestown.
- June 8 – Jamestown: Temporary Governor Gates' convoy meets the ships of Governor Thomas West, 3rd Baron De La Warr (Delaware) at Mulberry Island.
- June 10 – Jamestown: The convoy of temporary Governor Gates, and the ships of Governor Lord De La Warr, land at Jamestown.
- June 24 – Henri Membertou, Grand Chief of Mi'kmaq nation, becomes the first North American aboriginal person to accept baptism into the Christian faith and signs the Concordat of 1610, an agreement with the Roman Catholic Church recognizing the Mi'kmaq as an independent nation.

==== July–September ====
- July 4 – (June 24 O.S.); Polish–Russian War – Battle of Klushino: The outnumbered forces of the Polish–Lithuanian Commonwealth defeat the combined Russian and Swedish armies; Polish troops go on to occupy Moscow.
- July 5 – John Guy sets sail from Bristol, with 39 other colonists, for Newfoundland.
- July 9 – Lady Arbella Stuart, a claimant to the throne of England, is imprisoned for clandestinely marrying William Seymour, 2nd Duke of Somerset, another claimant, without royal permission on June 22.
- July 27 (July 17 O.S.) – Vasili Ivanovich Shuisky, who proclaimed himself Tsar of Russia on May 19, 1606, is deposed as the Seven Boyars remove him from office to select a new ruler.
- July 28 – War of the Jülich Succession: The Siege of Jülich, a walled city within the Holy Roman Empire (now in Germany), is started by a combined force of troops from the Dutch Republic, the Kingdom of France and the Margraviate of Brandenburg.
- August 2 – Henry Hudson sails into what is now known as Hudson Bay, thinking he has made it through the Northwest Passage and reached the Pacific Ocean.
- August 9 – Anglo-Powhatan Wars: The English launch a major attack on the Paspahegh village, capturing and executing the native queen and her children, burning houses and chopping down the corn fields; the subsequent use of the term "Paspahegh" in documents refers to their former territory.
- September 1 – Claudio Monteverdi's musical work Vespro della Beata Vergine (Vespers for the Blessed Virgin) is first published, printed in Venice and dedicated to Pope Paul V.
- September 2 – The Siege of Jülich ends as the Holy Roman Imperial city surrenders to Maurice of Nassau, commander of the Dutch Republic troops.
- September 4 – The Kingdom of Toungoo (now Myanmar) is retaken by King Anaukpetlun of Burma, as rebel leader Natshinnaung surrenders the city of Taungoo.
- September 6 – (August 27 O.S.); The Seven Boyars, the group of seven Russian nobles seeking stability in the troubled nation, vote to have King Wladyslaw IV of Poland as Tsar Vladislav of Russia, and invite the Polish-Lithuanian Commonwealth to take over the city.
- September 19 – Frederick V, age 14, becomes the new Prince-Elector of the Rhineland Palatinate, two days after the death of his father, Frederick IV.
- September 21 (September 11 O.S.) – Forces of the Polish-Lithuanian Commonwealth capture Moscow and begin occupation of the Kremlin for the next two years.

==== October–December ====
- October 9 – Poland, under the command of Hetman Stanisław Żółkiewski, takes control of the Kremlin during the Polish–Russian War.
- October 17 – The coronation of Louis XIII of France takes place.
- October 24 – The War of the Jülich Succession ends as the Protestant Union (including Margraviate of Brandenburg Brandenburg and Electoral Palatinate) and the Catholic League (led by the Duchy of Bavaria) agree to withdraw their forces from Germany and to disband them by year's end.
- November 6 – After the Parliament of England gives King James only £ 100,000 of an agreed to £ 600,000 of debt relief promised in February under the Great Contract, the King demands the rest of the funds. Parliament is outraged and declares the Contract abandoned on November 9.
- November 8 – The Basque witch trials come to an end after almost two years. Out of about 7,000 persons accused of witchcraft, only six are condemned to be executed by the Spanish Inquisition as two men (Domingo de Subildegui and Petri de Joangorena) and four women (María de Echachute, Graciana Xarra, Maria Baztan de Borda, and Maria de Arburu) are burned at the stake at Logroño .
- November 20 – The cession of Larache, a port in Morocco, takes place as Mohammed esh Sheikh el Mamun, Sultan of Morocco, transfers control of the city to Spain in return for. The Marquis de la Hinojosa accepts on behalf of King Felipe III of Spain in return for Spain's aid to the Sultan's fight against the Sultan's brother, Zidan Abu Maali. Larache remains under Spanish control for the next 79 years until another sultan retakes it.
- November 26 – French astronomers Nicolas-Claude Fabri de Peiresc and Joseph Gaultier make the first detailed observations of the Orion Nebula.
- December 18 – (December 8 O.S.) English astronomer Thomas Harriot becomes the first person on Earth to observe sunspots through a telescope.
- December 19 – Pieter Both becomes the first Governor-general of the Dutch East Indies (now the Republic of Indonesia), serving until 1614.
- December 20 – (December 10 O.S.), John Roberts, a Benedictine monk in Wales, is executed five days after being convicted of high treason for violating a law against Catholic ministry. He is hanged, drawn and quartered. Roberts will be canonized as a Roman Catholic saint almost 360 years later, on October 25, 1970.
- December 21 – (December 11 O.S.) The second False Dmitry is assassinated by a Kasim Tatar prince, Peter Urusov. After both Dmitry and Urosov have been drinking, Urusov shoots the Tsar Dmitry, then decapitates him.

==== Date unknown ====
- Dr. Bonham's Case, a landmark decision, is decided by Edward Coke, Chief Justice of the Common Pleas of England. Coke affirms the supremacy of the common law, which limits the power of Parliament as well as the king.
- The Manchu tribal leader Nurhaci breaks his relations with the Ming dynasty of China, at this time under the aloof and growingly negligent Wanli Emperor; Nurhaci's line later becomes the emperors of the Qing dynasty, which overthrows the short-lived Shun dynasty in 1644, and the remnants of the Ming throne in 1662.
- Publication is completed of the Douay–Rheims Bible (The Holie Bible Faithfully Translated into English), a translation of the Bible from the Latin Vulgate into English made by members of the English College, Douai, in the service of the Catholic Church.
- Jakob Böhme experiences another inner vision, in which he believes that he further understands the unity of the cosmos, and that he has received a special vocation from God.
- Work starts on the Wignacourt Aqueduct, in Malta.
- Santa Fe, New Mexico, capital of New Mexico, is founded as capital of Kingdom of Nuevo México.

=== 1611 ===
==== January–March ====
- January 26 – Maximilien de Béthune, Duke of Sully is forced by Queen regent Marie's Regency Council to resign as chief minister of France. He is replaced by Nicolas de Neufville, seigneur de Villeroy.
- February 27 – Sunspots are observed by telescope, by Frisian astronomers Johannes Fabricius and David Fabricius. Johannes publishes the results of these observations, in De Maculis in Sole observatis in Wittenberg, later this year. Such early discoveries are overlooked, however, and the first sighting is claimed a few months later, by Galileo Galilei and Christoph Scheiner.
- March 4 – George Abbot is enthroned as Archbishop of Canterbury in England.
- March 9 – Battle of Segaba in Begemder: Yemana Kristos, brother of Emperor of Ethiopia Susenyos I, ends the rebellion of Melka Sedeq.
- March 19–20 – The Moscow Uprising, an armed rising of the inhabitants of Moscow in the Tsardom of Russia against the military Polish–Lithuanian occupation of Moscow (Fall 1610–Fall 1612), results in the occupying forces starting a major fire in the city and the death of 6–7,000 Muscovites.

==== April–June ====
- April 4 – Denmark-Norway declares war on Sweden, then captures Kalmar.
- April 7 (March 28 O.S.) – False Dmitry III, the third pretender to the Russian throne to claim to be Prince Dmitry of Uglich, son of Ivan the Terrible, arrives at Ivangorod and proclaims himself as the Tsar Dmitry Ivanovich I.
- April 28 – The Colegio de Nuestra Señora del Santísimo Rosario is established in Manila, the Philippines (later renamed Colegio de Santo Tomas, and later still the University of Santo Tomas).
- April 30 – The priest implicated in the Aix-en-Provence possessions in France is executed.
- May 2 – The Authorized King James Version of the Bible is published for the first time, printed by Robert Barker in London.
- May 9 – At the age of 16, Emperor Go-Mizunoo succeeds his father Emperor Go-Yōzei as Emperor of Japan.
- May 11 – The first known performance of William Shakespeare's The Winter's Tale, probably new this year, is given at the Globe Theatre in London.
- May–December – Entrepreneur Thomas Sutton founds Charterhouse School, on the site of the old Carthusian monastery in Charterhouse Square, Smithfield, London.
- June 13 – The Siege of Smolensk in Russia by the Polish-Lithuanian Commonwealth succeeds after nearly two years of fighting that started on 29 September 1609. The conquest of the city is made possible by the discovery of a weakness in the walls of the fortress and the detonating of an explosive in a drainage canal.
- June 22 – English explorer and sea captain Henry Hudson, his teenage son John, and seven crewmen are set adrift in or near Hudson Bay, after a mutiny on his ship Discovery. They are never seen again.

==== July–September ====
- July 12 – The Perpetual Edict is proclaimed for the government of the Southern Netherlands (modern-day Belgium) by Archduke Albert VII and his wife Isabella, the joint rulers of the Austrian-controlled nation.
- July 17 – The army of the Swedish Empire commanded by Jacob De la Gardie captures the Russian city of Novgorod after a nine-day battle. Novgorod will remain Swedish territory for the next eight years.
- August 2 – Jamestown's Deputy Governor Sir Thomas Gates returns to Virginia with 280 people, provisions and cattle on six ships and assumes control, ruling that the fort must be strengthened.
- August 5 – Nasuh Pasha becomes the new grand vizier of the Ottoman Empire after the death of Kuyucu Murad Pasha.
- September 11 – Greek Orthodox bishop Dionysios Skylosophos leads an army of 700 men in a surprise attack on the city of Yanya (formerly the ancient Greek city of Ioannina) in an attempt to liberate the inhabitants from Ottoman Imperial rule. The Ottoman provincial governor, Osman Pasha, is forced to flee and his home is burned down, but Ottoman troops commanded by Aslan Pasha rout the rebels. Skylosophos is captured on September 14, then tortured to death in public.

==== October–December ====
- October 30 – At the age of 16, Gustav II Adolf succeeds his father Charles IX as King of Sweden.
- November 1 – At Whitehall Palace in London, William Shakespeare's last solo play, The Tempest, is given its earliest reported performance.
- December 2 (Keichō 16, 10th month, 28th day) – The 1611 Sanriku earthquake of 8.1 magnitude strikes off of the coast of Japan and causes a tsunami that kills almost 5,000 people in the northern section of Honshu island.
- December 5 (30 Ramadan 1020 A.H.) – To celebrate the end of the daily fasting of the month of Ramadan, the Mughal Empire Army commander, Mubariz Khan, hosts the celebration banquet and learns that Pashtun rebel leader Khwaja Usman and 250 of his men have evacuated Bokainagar (modern-day Gouripur in Bangladesh) during the Mughal Army's holiday observance.
- December – The week-long Conquest of Bakla leads to the fall of the Chandradwip kingdom and the Mughal annexation of Barisal into the Bengal Subah

==== Date unknown ====
- At Jamestown, John Rolfe imports tobacco seeds from the island of Trinidad (Nicotiana tabacum); the native tobacco is Nicotiana rustica.
- Thomas Dale founds the city of Henricus on the James River, with the assistance of 350 men, a few miles south of present day Richmond, Virginia.
- Famine in Ethiopia resulting from crop failure in the north due to weather conditions and the outbreak of a plague.
- Construction begins on Naqsh-e Jahan Square in Isfahan, Persia.
- Itoh Gofuku, a predecessor of Matsuzakaya, a famous department store, is founded for the sale of silk in Nagoya, Japan.

=== 1612 ===
==== January–March ====
- January 6 – Axel Oxenstierna becomes Lord High Chancellor of Sweden. He persuades the Riksdag of the Estates to grant the Swedish nobility the right and privilege to hold all higher offices of government.
- January 10 – Gustavus Adolphus replies to Metropolitan Isidor, Odoevskij and the estates of Novgorod, stating that he himself wishes to assume responsibility for the government of Novgorod and also of all Russians. A number of land grants signed the same day show that the Swedish king has assumed the title of Tsar.
- January 20
  - Rudolf II, Holy Roman Emperor, dies and several candidates vie to succeed him, with Archduke Matthias eventually being elected.
  - An uprising led by Dmitry Pozharsky begins in Moscow against occupying Polish troops.
- February 11 – Battle of Vittsjö: King Gustavus Adolphus of Sweden and 3,000 of his troops are forced to retreat from Denmark. The 17-year old king almost drowns while attempting to ride his horse across a frozen lake, but is rescued by two other members of his cavalry. The horse is lost.
- March 2 – The False Dmitry III, one of three pretenders to the Russian throne who all claim to be sons of Ivan the Terrible, is recognized as Tsar of Russia by the Cossacks.
- March 12 – At Daulambapur, near Kamalganj in what is now the Sylhet Division in Bangladesh, a battle takes place between 4,500 troops led by General Islam Khan I of India's Mughal Empire, and 12,000 defenders led by the Afghan warlord Khwaja Usman. The Mughals are almost defeated until Usman is struck in the eye by an arrow fired from a crossbow.

==== April–June ====
- April 10 – In England, 12 persons who become known as the Pendle witches allegedly hold a coven at the Malkin Tower in Lancashire on Good Friday, after which 10 people die mysteriously. All but two of the accused witches are tried for causing harm by witchcraft on August 18.
- April 11 – In Lichfield, Edward Wightman, a radical Anabaptist, becomes the last person to be burned at the stake in England as punishment for heresy.
- May 10 – Prince Khurram, the 20-year-old son of the Mughal Emperor Jahangir, marries 19-year-old Arjumand Banu Begum at a ceremony in Delhi. In 1628, Khurram becomes the Emperor Shah Jahan with Arjumand Begum as his chief consort Mumtaz Mahal. Arjumand dies in 1631 and Khurram later commissions and builds the Taj Mahal in her memory.
- May 25 – A Sicilian–Spanish galley fleet defeats the Tunisians at La Goulette after a battle.
- June 13 – Archduke Matthias of Austria is formally elected as the new Holy Roman Emperor.
- June 26 – The coronation of Matthias as Holy Roman Emperor takes place at the Frankfurt Cathedral.

==== July–September ====
- July 4 – (8th waxing of Waso 974 ME) In what is now Myanmar, Min Khamaung becomes the new King of Arakan upon the death of his father, King Min Razagyi.
- July 22 – Four women and one man are hanged following the Northamptonshire witch trials in England.
- July 24 – Marcantonio Memmo is elected as the Doge of the Republic of Venice on the first ballot of the Venetian council, winning 38 of the 41 votes. Memmo succeeds the late Doge Leonardo Donato, who died on July 16.
- August 20 – Ten Pendle witches are hanged, having been found guilty of practising witchcraft in Lancashire in England.
- August 26 – Battle of Kringen: A Scottish mercenary force is destroyed in Norway.
- September 1 – Battle of Moscow (1612): Led by General Jan Karol Chodkiewicz, a relief force from the Polish-Lithuanian Commonwealth, whose troops had been occupying Moscow for two years, make an unsuccessful attempt to break the Russian siege of the Kremlin, where General Mikolaj Strus and his troops are trapped. Both the Russians (led by Dmitry Pozharsky) and the Commonwealth troops suffer at least 1,000 deaths, but the Russians prevail. General Chodkiewicz tries a second attack the next day and fails.
- September 2 (August 23 O.S.) – The Lutheran Duchy of Prussia, a fiefdom within Poland, becomes the first Protestant government to follow the Roman Catholic nations in adopting the Gregorian calendar.
- September 5 – England's East India Company gets its first warships and establishes the "'Honourable East India Company's Marine'" to protect its freighters. The force develops over the centuries into the Royal Indian Navy and, after India's independence in 1947, the Indian Navy.
- September 22 – Retreating Polish and Lithuanian troops burn the Russian city of Vologda in reprisal for their defeat at Moscow.

==== October–December ====
- October 27 – Forces of the Polish-Lithuanian Commonwealth, which had been occupying Moscow for more than two years, surrender unconditionally to Russian militia forces and are allowed to leave after the Kremlin is liberated by Prince Dmitry Pozharsky and Prince Kuzma Minin.
- November 20 – The Treaty of Nasuh Pasha is signed, between the Ottoman Empire (Turkey) and the Safavid Empire (Iran), with the Ottomans ceding back land they had captured from the Safavids after 1555, in return for Safavid payment of 200 loads of silk.
- November 30 – Battle of Swally: Forces of the British East India Company and Portugal engage off the coast of India, resulting in an English victory.
- December 15 – Simon Marius becomes the first person on Earth to observe the Andromeda Galaxy through a telescope.
- December 28 – Galileo Galilei becomes the first astronomer to observe the planet Neptune when in conjunction with Jupiter. He mistakenly catalogues it as a fixed star, because of its extremely slow motion along the ecliptic. Neptune will not be truly recognized as a planet until 1846, about 234 years later, when Johann Gottfried Galle first sights it in the Berlin Observatory.

==== Date unknown ====
- The Nagoya Castle is completed in Japan.
- The Okamoto Daihachi incident in Japan.
- Thomas Shelton's English translation of the first half of Don Quixote is published. It is the first translation of the Spanish novel into any language.

=== 1613 ===
==== January–March ====
- January 11 – Workers in a sandpit in the Dauphiné region of France discover the skeleton of what is alleged to be a 30-foot tall man (the remains, it is supposed, of the giant Teutobochus, a legendary Gallic king who fought the Romans).
- January 20 – King James I of England successfully mediates the Treaty of Knäred between Denmark and Sweden.
- February 14 – Elizabeth, daughter of King James I of England, marries Frederick V, Elector Palatine.
- February 24 – King Anaukpetlun of Burma blockades the Portuguese port at Syriam with 80 warships and 3,000 men, then sets about to tunnel into the city.
- March 3 (February 21 O.S.) – An assembly of the Russian Empire elects Mikhail Romanov Tsar of Russia, ending the Time of Troubles. The House of Romanov will remain a ruling dynasty until 1917.
- March 27 – The first English child is born in Canada at Cuper's Cove, Newfoundland to Nicholas Guy.
- March 29
  - Explorer Samuel de Champlain becomes the first unofficial Governor of New France in Canada.
  - Burmese soldiers, tunneling under the walls of the Portuguese colonial fortress at Syriam (now Thanlyin), bring down a section of the walls and sack the city. Portuguese Governor Filipe de Brito e Nicote and rebel Burmese General Natshinnaung are captured, and executed by impalement on April 9.

==== April–June ====
- April 13 – Samuel Argall captures Algonquian princess Pocahontas in Passapatanzy, Virginia, to ransom her for some English prisoners held by her father, Chief Powhatan. She is brought to Henricus as a hostage.
- May 12 – Mikhail Romanov arrives in Moscow to begin his reign as Tsar of Russia, after having been elected on March 3.
- May 14
  - The city of Hanthawaddy (now Bago) is restored as the capital of Burma by King Anaukpetlun, who relocates the government from Ava (now Inwa).
  - The ruler of the principality of Martaban, Binnya Dala, surrenders to the armies of King Anaukpetlun of Burma.
- May 23 – War of the Montferrat Succession: The defenders of the Italian city of Nizza Monferrato successfully resist a nine-day siege by the troops of Charles Emmanuel I, Duke of Savoy.
- May 27 – After getting an official proclamation that he is the French Governor of New France, explorer Samuel de Champlain begins exploration of the area westward from Quebec, traveling along the Ottawa River.
- June 28 (July 8 N.S.) – From Jamestown, John Rolfe makes the first shipment to England of tobacco grown in Virginia, dispatching it on the ship The Elizabeth. The tobacco arrives in England after a voyage of three weeks.
- June 29 – Fire destroys London's famed Globe Theatre, during a performance of Shakespeare's Henry VIII.

==== July–September ====
- July 20 (July 30 N.S.) – The first American-grown tobacco, produced in the British colony of Virginia, arrives in England after being dispatched 22 days earlier by John Rolfe.
- July 26 – Diego Marín de Negron, the Spanish Governor of Rio de la Plata y Paraguay, is assassinated by poisoning at his palace in Buenos Aires.C. Antonio Zinny, History of the governors of the Argentine provinces from 1810 to the present (Editoriales Huemul, 1941) p.105
- July 28 – Gregor Richter, the chief pastor of Görlitz, denounces Jacob Boehme as a heretic, in his Sunday sermon.
- August 29 – The Sicilians under de Aragon defeat the trade fleet of the Ottoman Empire, ending the Battle of Cape Corvo.
- September 29 – The New River is opened, to supply London with drinking water from Hertfordshire.

==== October–December ====
- October 21 – Gabriel Bathory, ruler of the Principality of Transylvania, is removed from office by vote of the nobles meeting at Gyulafehérvár (now Alba Iulia in Romania). Bathory refuses to vacate the palace at the Transylvanian capital at Várad, (now Oradea in Romania), and is murdered on October 27.
- October 23 – Gabriel Bethlen is elected as the new Prince of Transylvania.
- October 28 – Keichō embassy: Hasekura Tsunenaga departs Japan in the Date Maru with a Japanese diplomatic mission to the Holy See, scheduled to first travel to Acapulco in New Spain, with a goal of concluding an agreement between Tokugawa Ieyasu and the East India Company, permitting English merchants to live and trade in Japan.
- November 3 – English royal favourite Robert Carr is created 1st Earl of Somerset.
- November 30 – King Anaukpetlun of Burma sends an army of 4,000 troops to drive the Siamese occupiers from the Tenasserim coast.
- December 26 –
  - The Date Maru, carrying the Japanese diplomatic mission commanded Hasekura Tsunenaga, reaches North America, sighting Cape Mendocino on the California coast.
  - The Earl of Somerset marries Frances Howard, following the September 25 annulment of her marriage to Robert Devereux, 3rd Earl of Essex; the event is the inspiration for John Donne's Eclogue.
- December 26 – The Burmese Army defeats the Siamese Army at Tavoy. The city is now part of Myanmar as Dawei.
- December 27 – Mateo Leal de Ayala becomes the new Governor of Rio de la Plata y Paraguay, covering what will become the nations of Argentina, Chile and Paraguay. He succeeds Diego Marín de Negron, who was poisoned on July 26.

==== Date unknown ====
- A locust swarm destroys La Camarque, France.
- Kuwait City is founded.
- Sultan Agung of Mataram takes the throne of the kingdom of Mataram in Java.
- Near Jamestown, Virginia, Sir Thomas Dale starts a settlement called Bermuda City, which later becomes part of Hopewell, Virginia.

=== 1614 ===
==== January–March ====
- January 22 – Led by Hasekura Tsunenaga, Japan's trade expedition to New Spain (now Mexico) arrives on the Mexican coast with 22 samurai, 120 Japanese merchants, sailors and servants, and 40 Spaniards and Portuguese who serve as interpreters. Having reached the Americas after a voyage that began on October 28, the expedition travels to Acapulco and arrives on January 25.
- January 27 – The Noordsche Compagnie is founded in the Netherlands at Vlieland as a cartel in the whaling market.
- February 1 – In Japan, the practice of Christianity is banned and an edict issues for the expulsion of all foreign missionaries.
- February 2 – Iran's Safavid dynasty Emperor, Abbas the Great, carries out the execution of his oldest son, Crown Prince Mohammad Baqer Mirza, on suspicion that his son is planning to kill him.
- February 14 (February 4 O.S.) – King James I of England issues his proclamation Against Private Challenges and Combats in an effort to end duels.
- February 20 – Matthias I, Archduke of Austria, King of Hungary, Croatia and Bohemia, and Holy Roman Emperor, directs the restoration of Roman Catholic rule to Aachen, allowing the Army of Flanders (from the Spanish Netherlands) to lay siege to the German town.
- March 15 – Construction begins on the Takada Castle in Japan.
- March 17 – The States General of the Republic of the Seven United Netherlands authorizes an exclusive monopoly for trade in the New World, providing for the winning company to be able to make four voyages to the eastern coast of North America between 40° N and 45° N, encompassing what are now the U.S. states of New Jersey. The New Netherland Company receives the exclusive patent, effective January 1, 1615.

==== April–June ====
- April 5 (April 15 N.S.)
  - Pocahontas, the 17-year-old daughter of Chief Wahunsenacawh of the Powhatan Algonquian native tribe in what is now the U.S. state of Virginia, is forced into child marriage with English colonist John Rolfe at Jamestown, a year after her capture in war. She is given the name of Rebecca Rolfe and departs with John Rolfe to England in 1616, dying before she can return.
  - The Addled Parliament is assembled in England as the second parliament of King James I, and the first in more than nine years. Its members serve for two months without passing any laws.
  - The Republic of the Netherlands and the Kingdom of Sweden enter into a treaty at the Hague. A new parliament will not be seated until more than six years later.
- April 30 – The Kingdom of Lan Na (in what is now northern Thailand) is invaded by 17,000 troops commanded by King Anaukpetlun of Burma (now Myanmar). Lan Na's King Thado Kyaw is unsuccessful in getting assistance from the Kingdom of Siam, and turns to the Kingdom of Lan Xang (now Laos), which provides assistance.
- May 14 – An earthquake strikes the Azores islands and levels the village of Vila Franca do Campo.
- May 15 – The Queen Regent of France, Marie de' Medici, convenes the Estates General to suppress a rebellion by Henri II, Prince of Condé.
- May 17 – Battle of Rohatyn: Mutinous "konfederacja" Polish troops are defeated by the Polish Army, led by General Stanisław Koniecpolski.
- June 7 – The Addled Parliament is dissolved by King James.

==== July–September ====
- July 6 – Raid of Żejtun: Ottoman forces make a final attempt to conquer the island of Malta, but are beaten back by the Knights Hospitaller.
- July 16 – In reprisal for the attempt of "the False Dmitry", a man who claimed to be the son of Ivan the Terrible, to claim the throne, Tsar Michael I has Dmitry's 3-year-old son, Ivan Dmitriyevich, publicly hanged in Moscow.
- August 23 – The University of Groningen is established in the Dutch Republic.
- August 24 – The Siege of Aachen begins as the Spanish Army of Flanders, commanded by Amrogio Spinola, attacks with 15,000 troops. The 600-man defense force from Brandenburg surrenders a few days later.
- September 1 – In England, Sir Julius Caesar becomes Master of the Rolls.

==== October–December ====
- October 2 – After Louis XIII reaches the age of 23, he is given full power as King of France and the regency of his mother is ended. Queen Regent Marie retains her position as leader of the Conseil du Roi, however, and continues to control the French government.
- October 11 – Adriaen Block and a group of Amsterdam merchants petition the States General of the Northern Netherlands for exclusive trading rights, in the area he explored and named "New Netherland".
- October 13 – The second War of the Jülich Succession, which flared up a second time in May, comes to an end.
- October 17 – On the orders of Ahmed I, Sultan of the Ottoman Empire, Grand Vizier Nasuh Pasha is strangled to death by the chief of the Sultan's bodyguards.
- October 27 – The French Estates General begins its last session. The session, with 464 deputies representing the nobility, the lower and middle classes, and the clergy, closes on February 23, 1615. For the next 175 years, the Kingdom of France will be governed as an absolute monarchy until the calling of a new Estates General in 1789 during the French Revolution).
- November 12 – The Treaty of Xanten ends the War of the Jülich Succession.
- November 19 – Hostilities resulting from an attempt by Toyotomi Hideyori to restore Osaka Castle begin. Tokugawa Ieyasu, father of the shōgun, is outraged at this act, and leads three thousand men across the Kizu River, destroying the fort there.
- December 4 – The Siege of Osaka begins in Japan.

==== Date unknown ====
- Scottish mathematician John Napier publishes Mirifici Logarithmorum Canonis Descriptio (Description of the Admirable Table of Logarithms), outlining his discovery of logarithms, and incorporating the decimal mark. Astronomer Johannes Kepler soon begins to employ logarithms, in his description of the Solar System.
- Tisquantum, a Native American of the Wampanoag Nation, is kidnapped and enslaved by Thomas Hunt, an English sea captain working with Captain John Smith. Freed in Spain, Tisquantum (a.k.a. Squanto) will travel for five years in Europe and North America, before returning to his home in Plymouth, Massachusetts. Twenty months later, he will be able to teach the Pilgrims the basics of farming and trade in the New World.
- The Fama Fraternitatis is published, the first of three allegorical Rosicrucian manifestoes in the Holy Roman Empire
- The Duchess of Malfi is performed at the Globe theatre

=== 1615 ===
==== January–March ====
- January 1 – The New Netherland Company is granted a three-year monopoly in North American trade, between the 40th and 45th parallels.
- January 30 – Japan's diplomatic mission to Europe, led by Hasekura Tsunenaga, meets with King Philip III of Spain at Madrid and presents an offer of a treaty.
- February 2 – Sir Thomas Roe sets out to become the first ambassador from the court of the King of England to the Mughal Emperor Jahangir, departing from Tilbury Hope on the ship Lyon under the command of captain Christopher Newport.
- February 17 – Japan's envoy to Europe, Hasekura Tsunenaga, receives a Christian baptism by the royal chaplain, Diego de Guzmán, and receives the European name Felipe Francisco Hasekura.
- March 10 – John Ogilvie, a Jesuit priest, is hanged and drawn at Glasgow Cross in Scotland for refusing to pledge allegiance to King James VI of Scotland; he will be canonised in 1976, becoming the only post-Reformation Scottish saint.

==== April–June ====
- April 21 – The Wignacourt Aqueduct is inaugurated in Malta.
- May 6 – The Peace of Tyrnau is signed between Matthias, Holy Roman Emperor, and Gábor Bethlen.
- June 2 – The first Récollet missionaries arrive at Quebec City, from Rouen, France.
- June 3 – The Eastern Army of Tokugawa Ieyasu and the Osaka Army of Toyotomi Hideyori clash during the Battle of Dōmyōji and the Battle of Tennōji.
- June 4 – Forces under shōgun Tokugawa Ieyasu take Osaka Castle in Japan, beginning a period of peace which lasts nearly 250 years. Bands of Christian samurai support Ieyasu's enemies at the Battle of Osaka.
- June 21 – The Peace of Asti is concluded between the Spanish Empire and Savoy.

==== July–September ====
- July 7 – In Japan, the Buke shohatto, a 19-section law setting a standard of conduct for individual warlords (daimyo) and their responsibilities to the Tokugawa shogunate, is proclaimed by the shogun Tokugawa Hidetada before the assembled daimyo at Fushimi Castle in Kyoto.
- August 9 – Swedish troops led by King Gustavus Adolphus begin the siege of the Russian city of Pskov, but fail to take the fortress after 12 weeks. The siege ends on October 27.
- August 20 – Alvaro III Nimi a Mpanzu becomes the new ruler of the Kingdom of Kongo (located in southwestern Africa in what is now Angola) upon the death of his brother, Bernardo II Nimi a Nkanga.
- August 30 – A Spanish treasure fleet of 41 ships is struck in the Gulf of Mexico by a powerful storm that sinks the ship San Miguel
- September 12 – The San Leoncio Day hurricane strikes the islands of Puerto Rico and Hispaniola.
- September 16 – An estimated 7.5 magnitude earthquake strikes Arica (now part of Chile in the Spanish colonial Viceroyalty of Peru and collapses the city's fort, but causes no deaths.
- September 17 – Los Baños, Laguna, is founded by Spanish colonists on Luzon island in the Philippines.
- September 20 – Japanese diplomat Hasekura Tsunenaga and his entourage become the first officials from Japan to visit Italy, and are received in Rome by Cardinal Burgecio

==== October–December ====
- October 5 – The Spánverjavígin, the last massacre to be carried out in Iceland, begins as 14 Basque Whalers from Spain are murdered at Thingeyri while sleeping. Another 18 are killed on October 13, including Captain Martín de Villafranca. The 31 had been survivors of a shipwreck on Iceland in September.
- October 27 – In Russia, the siege of Pskov ends with the withdrawal of Swedish Army troops. The siege is the last battle of the Ingrian War.
- November 3 – Japanese diplomat Hasekura Tsunenaga and his delegation are received by Pope Paul V in Rome, and present a request for trade between the Roman Catholic Church and the Japanese shogunate
- November 7 – The Portuguese freighter Nossa Senhora da Luz, carrying 150 crew and a cargo of Chinese and Burmese goods, sinks in a storm near the Azores.
- November 22 – Alexandru Movilă is installed as Prince of Moldavia by Poland as Prince Ștefan IX Tomșa is driven from the throne.
- November 24 – King Louis XIII of France marries Princess Ana María Mauricia, the 14-year-old daughter of King Philip III of Spain. The two had been legally united in a marriage by proxy on October 18.
- November – The Mughals under Jahangir launch the first offensive against Kajali, a border post of the Ahom kingdom.
- December 2 – In the Venetian Republic, Giovanni Bembo is elected chief executive as the new Doge of Venice after the October 31 death of Marcantonio Memmo.
- December 6 – In England, John Winthrop, later governor of the future Massachusetts Bay Colony, marries his second wife (of four), Thomasine Clopton, daughter of William Clopton of Castleins, near Groton, Suffolk.
- December 18 – Francisco de Borja y Aragón becomes the new Viceroy of Peru, a colony of Spain encompassing all of Spanish language-speaking South America and what are now the nations of Peru, Argentina, Bolivia, Chile, Colombia, Ecuador, Panama, Paraguay, and Uruguay.
- December 20 – The Uskok War begins after the ports of the Holy Roman Empire on the Adriatic Sea are blockaded by the Republic of Venice, which has hired English and Dutch mercenaries.

==== Date unknown ====
- Easter – Persian Safavid hordes, led by Shah Abbas the Great, kill all the monks at the David Gareja monastery complex in Georgia, and set fire to its collection of manuscripts and works of art.
- Mary Talbot, Countess of Shrewsbury, is released from the Tower of London, in recognition of her role in helping to discover the murder of Sir Thomas Overbury.
- The Somers Isles Company is founded to administer Bermuda.
- John Browne is created the first King's Gunfounder in England.
- Austrian merchants receive economic privileges in the Ottoman Empire.
- The Perse School in Cambridge, England, is founded by Dr Stephen Perse.
- Wilson's School in Wallington, near London, is founded by Royal Charter.
- The Grolsch Brewery is founded in Groenlo, Netherlands.
- Konoike Shinroku opens an office in Osaka, and begins shipping tax-rice from western Japan to Osaka.
- Johannes Kepler publishes Dissertatio cum Nuncio Sidereo, in response to Galileo's discovery of Jupiter's moons.
- Manuel Dias, a Portuguese Jesuit missionary, introduces the telescope for the first time in China, in his book Tian Wen Lüe (Explicatio Sphaerae Coelestis).
- The second volume of Miguel de Cervantes's Don Quixote ("El ingenioso hidalgo Don Quijote de la Mancha") is published, and is as successful as the first. Don Quixote eventually becomes the only truly famous work its author ever writes.

=== 1616 ===
==== January–March ====
- January 1 – King James I of England attends the masque The Golden Age Restored, a satire by Ben Jonson on fallen court favorite the Earl of Somerset. The king asks for a repeat performance on January 6.
- January 3 – In the court of James I of England, the king's favorite George Villiers becomes Master of the Horse (encouraging development of the thoroughbred horse); on April 24 he receives the Order of the Garter; and on August 27 he is created Viscount Villiers and Baron Waddon, receiving a grant of land valued at £80,000. In 1617, he will be made Earl of Buckingham. After the Earl of Pembroke, he is the second richest nobleman in England.
- January 10 – English diplomat Sir Thomas Roe presents his credentials to the Mughal Emperor Jahangir, in Ajmer Fort, opening the door to the British presence in India. Roe sailed in the Lyon under the command of captain Christopher Newport, best known for his role in the Virginia colonies.
- January 12 – The city of Belém, Brazil is founded on the Amazon River delta, by Portuguese captain Francisco Caldeira Castelo Branco, who had previously taken the city of São Luís in Maranhão from the French.
- January 15 – After overwintering with the Huron Indians, Samuel de Champlain and Recollect Father Joseph Le Caron visit the Petun and Ottawa Indians of the Great Lakes. This is Champlain's last trip in North America before returning to France. Having secured Canada, he helps create French America, New France, or L'Acadie.
- January 29 – Dutch captain Willem Schouten, in the Eendracht, rounds the southern tip of South America, and names it Kaap Hoorn, after his birthplace in Holland.
- January – 6-year-old António Vieira arrives from Portugal with his parents in Bahia (modern-day Salvador) in Colonial Brazil, where he will become a diplomat, noted author, leading figure of the Church, and protector of Brazilian indigenous peoples, in an age of intolerance.
- February 1 – James I of England grants Ben Jonson an annual pension of 100 marks, making him de facto poet laureate.
- February 17 – Manchurian leader Qing Tai Zu, referred to in the west as "Nurhaci", declares himself khan and crowns himself as Emperor of China, founding the Later Jin dynasty.
- February 18 - Preparing the declaration of independence from the colony of the Hashimi Empire, namely the Arya Bayu Kingdom by Khan Nasaruddin II, who was crowned in Mecca,Medina, and Isfahan.
- February 19 – The first recorded eruption of Mayon Volcano, the Philippines' most active volcano, takes place.
- February 24 – A commission of Roman Catholic theologians, the "Qualifiers," reports that the idea that the Sun is stationary is "foolish and absurd in philosophy, and formally heretical since it explicitly contradicts in many places the sense of Holy Scripture...".
- February 26 – Astronomer Galileo Galilei appears before Cardinal Roberto Bellarmino and "warned of the error of the Copernican opinion taught by him", and enjoined by the Catholic Church against any attempt to hold, teach or defend the position of Copernicus that the Sun is stationary rather than revolving around the Earth "in any way whatsoever, verbally or in writing."
- February 28 – In the aftermath of the 1613–1614 anti-Jewish pogrom called the Fettmilch uprising in Frankfurt, Germany, mob leader Vincenz Fettmilch is beheaded, but the Jews, who had been expelled from the city on August 23, 1614, following the plundering of the Judengasse, can return only as a result of direct intervention by Holy Roman Emperor Matthias. After long negotiations, the Jews are left without any compensation for their plundered belongings.
- February – English merchants of the East India Company complain that the great troubles and wars in Japan since their arrival have put them to much pains and charges. Two great cities, Osaka and Sakaii, have been burned to the ground, each one almost as big as London, and not one house left standing, and it is reported above 300,000 men have lost their lives, “yet the old Emperor Ogusho Same hath prevailed and Fidaia Same either been slain or fled secretly away, that no news is to be heard of him.” Jesuits, priests, and friars are banished by the emperor and their churches and monasteries pulled down; they put the fault on the arrival of the English; it is said if Fidaia Same had prevailed against the emperor, he promised them entrance again, when without doubt all the English would have been driven out of Japan.
- March 5 – De revolutionibus orbium coelestium, written by Nicolaus Copernicus in 1543 is placed on the Index of Forbidden Books, by the Congregation of the Index of the Roman Catholic Church "until corrected".
- March 11
  - Galileo Galilei meets Pope Paul V in person, to discuss his position as a defender of Copernicus' heliocentrism. The Pope promises Galileo safety from any enemies, and Galileo complies for the next seven years with the injunction against teaching Copernican doctrines.
  - English Roman Catholic priest, Thomas Atkinson, is hanged, drawn, and quartered at York, at age 70 (he will be beatified by Pope John Paul II on November 22, 1987).
- March 19
  - Sir Walter Ralegh, English explorer of the New World, is released from prison in the Tower of London, where he has been imprisoned for treason, in order to conduct a second (ill-fated) expedition, in search of El Dorado in South America.
  - The Scornful Lady, a comedy stage play written by Francis Beaumont and John Fletcher, is published.
- March 26–August 30 – English explorer William Baffin, as pilot to Robert Bylot on the Discovery, makes a detailed exploration of Baffin Bay, whilst searching for the Northwest Passage. The expedition also discovers Smith Sound, Lancaster Sound and Devon Island, and reaches latitude 77° 45' North, a record which holds for 236 years.
- March 31 – Mughal Emperor Jahangir confers the title of Nur Jahan ('Light of the World') on his 20th wife.
- March – Action of 1616, La Goulette, Tunisia: A Spanish squadron under Francisco de Ribera defeats a Tunisian fleet.

==== April–June ====
- April 25 – Sir John Coke, in the Court of King's Bench (England), holds the King's actions in a case of In commendam to be illegal.
- May 3 – The Treaty of Loudun is signed, ending a series of rebellions in France.
- May 25 – King James I of England's former favourite, the Earl of Somerset, and his wife Frances, are convicted of the murder of Thomas Overbury in 1613. They are spared death, and are sentenced to imprisonment in the Tower of London (until 1622). Although the King has ordered the investigation of the poet's murder and allowed his former court favorite to be arrested and tried, his court, now under the influence of George Villiers, gains the reputation of being corrupt and vile. The sale of peerages (beginning in July) and the royal visit of James's brother-in-law, Christian IV of Denmark, a notorious drunkard, add further scandal.
- June 12 – Pocahontas (now Rebecca) arrives in England, with her husband, John Rolfe, their one-year-old son, Thomas Rolfe, her half-sister Matachanna (alias Cleopatra) and brother-in-law Tomocomo, the shaman also known as Uttamatomakkin (having set out in May). Ten Powhatan Indians are brought by Sir Thomas Dale, the colonial governor, at the request of the Virginia Company, as a fund-raising device. Dale, having been recalled under criticism, writes A True Relation of the State of Virginia, Left by Sir Thomas Dale, Knight, in May last, 1616, in a successful effort to redeem his leadership. Neither Pocahontas or Dale see Virginia again.

==== July–September ====
- July 6 – First recorded eruption of Manam Volcano (erupting frequently since), forming a 10-km-wide island in the Bismarck Sea, 13 km (8.1 mi) off coast of Papua New Guinea, in the southwestern part of the Pacific Ring of Fire.
- July 20 – The death of Hugh O'Neill, 2nd Earl of Tyrone, in exile in Rome, ends the Flight of the Earls from Ireland.
- August 8 – The Tokugawa shogunate (Bakufu) in Japan forbids foreigners other than Chinese from traveling freely, or trading outside of the ports of Nagasaki and Hirado.
- September 15 – The first non-aristocratic, free public school in Europe is opened in Frascati, Italy.

==== October–December ====
- October 10 – Sakazaki Naomori of Iwami Tsuwano han commits suicide after failing to kidnap Princess Sen.
- October 25 – Dirk Hartog makes the second recorded landfall by a European on Australian soil, at Dirk Hartog Island off the Western Australian coast, and the pewter Hartog Plate is left to mark the landfall of the Dutch ship Eendracht.
- October
  - John Donne is appointed as Reader in Divinity at his old inn of court in London, Lincoln's Inn.
  - King James's School, Knaresborough in Yorkshire is founded by Dr. Robert Chaloner, and the charter is signed by King James I of England.
- October/November – Ben Jonson's satirical five-act comedy, The Devil is an Ass, is produced at the Blackfriars Theatre in London by the King's Men, poking fun at contemporary credence in witchcraft and Middlesex juries.
- November 4 – Prince Charles (15-year-old surviving son of James I of England and Anne of Denmark) is invested as Prince of Wales at Whitehall in London, the last such formal investiture until 1911.
- November 5 – Bishop Lancelot Andrewes preaches the annual Gunpowder Treason sermon before King James I of England at Whitehall, both having been intended victims of the plot.
- November 6–25 – Ben Jonson's works are published in a collected folio edition (the first of any English playwright).
- November 6 – Captain William Murray is granted a royal patent, giving him the sole privilege of importing tobacco to Scotland for a period of 21 years. Continuing from the reign of Elizabeth I of England, the creation of grants and patents reaches a new highwater mark from 1614 to 1621, during the reign of James I of England.
- November 13 – Italian artist Guido Reni's famous Pietà, commissioned by the Senate of Bologna, is placed on the greater altar of the church of Santa Maria della Pietà.
- November 14 – In England, Sir Edward Coke is dismissed as Chief Justice of the King's Bench by royal prerogative.
- November 16
  - The Tepehuán Revolt begins in Nueva Vizcaya with the attack of a Spanish wagon train that is on its way to Mexico City. It tests the limits of Spanish and Jesuit colonialism, in western and northwestern Durango and southern Chihuahua, Mexico.
  - Marco Antonio de Dominis, Roman Catholic Archbishop of the See of Spalato and Primate of Dalmatia, having run afoul of Pope Paul V over secular matters relating to Venice, submits to King James I of England and later becomes Dean of Windsor.
- November 30 – Cardinal Richelieu, Armand-Jean du Plessis, is named French Secretary of State by young king Louis XIII. Richelieu will change France into a unified centralised state, able to resist both England and the Habsburg Empire.
- November
  - Peter Paul Rubens begins work on classical tapestries, when a contract is signed in Antwerp with cloth dyers Jan Raes and Frans Sweerts in Brussels, and the Genoese merchant Franco Cattaneo.
  - René Descartes, at age 20, graduates in civil and canon law at the University of Poitiers, where he becomes disillusioned with books, preferring to seek truths from "le grand livre du monde." His thesis defense may be written in December.
  - With small profits to show, the Virginia Company decides to distribute land in Virginia to shareholders according to the number of shares owned. Each stockholder can set up a "particular" plantation and pay associated expenses, receiving 100 acres (0.40 km^{2}) of land for each share and 50 acres (200,000 m^{2}) for each person transported (the "headrights" system).
  - Scholar Robert Burton is made vicar of St Thomas the Martyr's Church, Oxford.
- December 10 – An ordinance establishes parish schools in Scotland. The same act of the Privy Council commends the abolition of Gaelic.
- December 18 – A widely reported earthquake occurs in Leipzig, Germany (also dated December 22).
- December 22 – An Indian youth (called one of "the first fruits of India") is baptized with the name "Peter" in London at the St. Dionis Backchurch, in a ceremony attended by the Lord Mayor, the Privy Council, city aldermen, and officials of the Honourable East India Company. Peter thus becomes the first convert to the Anglican Church in India. He returns to India as a missionary, schooled in English and Latin.
- December 25
  - "Father Christmas" is a main character of Christmas, His Masque, written by Ben Jonson and presented at the court of King James I of England. Father Christmas is considered a papist symbol by Puritans, and later banished from England until the English Restoration. The traditional, comical costume for this jolly figure, as well as regional names, indicate that he is descended from the presenter of the medieval Feast of Fools.
  - Captain Nathaniel Courthope reaches the nutmeg-rich island of Run in the Moluccas, to defend it against the Dutch East India Company. A contract with the inhabitants, accepting James I of England as their sovereign, makes it part of the English colonial empire.
- December – In the Middle East, traveller Pietro Della Valle marries Jowaya, daughter of a Nestorian Christian father and an Armenian mother, in Baghdad. The couple then sets off (1617) to find the Shah in Isfahan.

==== Date unknown ====
- Abbas I's Kakhetian and Kartlian campaigns occur as progressive combats. Abbas I of Persia captures Tbilisi following a conflict with the Georgian soldiers and the general populace. After the capture of Tbilisi, Abbas I confronts an Ottoman army. The battle takes place near Lake Gökçe, and results in a Safavid victory.
- Oorsprong en voortgang der Nederlandtscher beroerten (Origin and progress of the disturbances in the Netherlands), by Johannes Gysius, is published.
- The Collegium Musicum is founded in Prague.
- Physician Aleixo de Abreu is granted a pension of 16,000 reis, for services to the crown in Angola and Brazil, by Philip III of Spain, who also appoints him physician of his chamber.
- Ngawang Namgyal arrives in Bhutan, having escaped Tibet.
- The Swiss Guard is appointed part of the household guard of King Louis XIII of France.
- Week-long festivities in honor of the Prince of Urbano, of the Barberini family, occur in Florence, Italy.
- Richard Steel and John Crowther complete their journey from Ajmeer in the Mughal Empire to Ispahan in Persia.
- Captain John Smith publishes his book A description of New England in London. Smith relates one voyage to the coast of Massachusetts and Maine, in 1614, and an attempted voyage in 1615, when he was captured by French pirates and detained for several months before escaping.
- The New England Indian smallpox or leptospirosis epidemic of 1616–19 begins to depopulate the region, killing an estimated 90% of the coastal native peoples.
- A slave ship carries smallpox from the Kingdom of Kongo to Salvador, Brazil.
- In England, louse-borne epidemic typhus ravages the poor and crowded.
- A fatal disease of cattle, probably rinderpest, spreads through the Italian provinces of Padua, Udine, Treviso and Vicenza, introduced most likely from Dalmatia or Hungary. Great numbers of cattle die in Italy, as they had in previous years (1559, 1562, 1566, 1590, 1598) in other European regions when harvest failure also drives people to the brink of starvation (for example, 1595–97 in Germany). The consumption of beef and veal is prohibited, and Pope Paul V issues an edict prohibiting the slaughter of draught oxen that are suitable for plowing. Calves are also not slaughtered for some time afterwards, so that Italy's cattle herds can be replenished.
- At the behest of Sir Ferdinando Gorges, Dr. Richard Vines, a physician, passes the winter of 1616–17 at Biddeford, Maine, at the mouth of the Saco River, that he calls Winter Harbor. This is the site of the earliest permanent settlement in Maine, of which there is a conclusive record. Maine will become an important refuge for religious dissenters persecuted by the Puritans.
- In Spanish Florida, the Cofa Mission at the mouth of the Suwannee River disappears.
- The first African slaves are brought to Bermuda, an English colony, by Captain George Bargrave to dive for pearls, because of their reputed skill in this activity. Harvesting pearls off the coast proves unsuccessful, and the slaves are put to work planting and harvesting the initial large crops of tobacco and sugarcane. At the same time, some English refuse to purchase Brazilian sugar because it is produced by slave labour.
- Italian natural philosopher Giulio Cesare Vanini publishes a radically heterodox book in France, after his English interlude De admirandis naturae reginae deaeque mortalium arcanis, for which he is condemned and forced to flee Paris. For his opinion that the world is eternal and governed by immanent laws, as expressed in this book, he is executed in 1619.
- Francesco Albani paints the ceiling frescoes of Apollo and the Seasons, at the Palazzo Verospi in Via del Corso, for Cardinal Fabrizio Verospi.
- Elizabethan polymath and alchemist Robert Fludd publishes his first book, Apologia Compendiaria, Fraternitatem de Rosea Cruce suspicionis … maculis aspersam, veritatis quasi Fluctibus abluens, which was a defense of the ideas of the Rosicrucians.
- Johannes Valentinus Andreae claims to be the author of Chymische Hochzeit Christiani Rosencreutz Anno 1459 published in Strasbourg.
- Witch trials:
  - John Cotta writes his influential book The Triall of Witch-craft.
  - Elizabeth Rutter is hanged as a witch in Middlesex, England, Agnes Berrye in Enfield, and nine women in Leicester on the testimony of a raving 13-year-old named John Smith, under the Witchcraft Act 1603. In Orkney, Elspeth Reoch is tried. In France Leger (first name unknown) is condemned for witchcraft on May 6, Sylvanie de la Plaine is burned at Pays de Labourde as a witch, and in Orléans eighteen witches are killed.
  - A second witch-hunt breaks out in Biscay, Spain. An Edict of Silence is issued by the Inquisition, but the king overturns the Edict, and 300 accused witches are burned alive.
- Latest probable date of Thomas Middleton composition of The Witch, a tragicomedy that may have entered into the present-day text of Shakespeare's Macbeth.
- "Drink to me only with thine eyes" comes from Ben Jonson's love poem, To Celia. Jonson's poetic lamentation On my first Sonne is also from this year.
- Francis de Sales' literary masterpiece Treatise on the Love of God is published, while he is Bishop of Geneva.
- Orlando Gibbons' anthem See, the Word is Incarnate is written.
- Italian naturalist Fabio Colonna states that "tongue stones" (glossopetrae) are shark teeth, in his treatise De glossopetris dissertatio.
- An important English dictionary is published by Dr. John Bullokar with the title An English Expositor: teaching the interpretation of the hardest words used in our language, with sundry explications, descriptions and discourses.
- English mathematician Henry Briggs goes to Edinburgh, to show John Napier his efficient method of finding logarithms, by the continued extraction of square roots.
- Moralist writer John Deacon publishes a quarto entitled Tobacco Tortured in the Filthy Fumes of Tobacco Refined (supporting the views of James I of England). Deacon writes the same year that syphilis is a "Turkished", "Spanished", or "Frenchized" disease that the English contract by "trafficking with the contagious courruptions."
- Fortunio Liceti publishes De Monstruorum Natura in Italy, which marks the beginning of studies into malformations of the embryo.
- Dutch traders smuggle the coffee plant out of Mocha, a port in Yemen on the Red Sea, and cultivate it at the Amsterdam Botanical Gardens. The Dutch later introduce it to Java.
- Muhammad Baqir Majlisi, known as Allameh Majlesi, is born in the city of Isfahan.
- Fort San Diego, in Acapulco Bay, Mexico, is completed by the Spanish as a defence against their erstwhile vassals, the Dutch.
- Anti-Christian persecutions break out in Nanjing, China, and Nagasaki, Japan. The Jesuit-lead Christian community in Japan at this time is over 3,000,000 strong.
- Master seafarer Henry Mainwaring, Oxford graduate and lawyer turned successful Newfoundland pirate, returns to England, is pardoned after rescuing a Newfoundland trading fleet near Gibraltar, and begins to write a revealing treatise on piracy.
- The first Thai embassy to Japan arrives.
- William Harvey gives his views on the circulation of blood, as Lumleian Lecturer at the Royal College of Physicians. It is not until 1628 that he gives his views in print.
- The Dutch establish their colony of Essequibo, in the region of the Essequibo River, in northern South America (present-day Guyana), for sugar and tobacco production. The colony is protected by Fort Kyk-Over-Al, now in ruins. The Dutch also map the Delaware River in North America.
- The Ottoman Empire attempts landings at the shoreline between Cádiz and Lisbon.
- Croatian mathematician Faustus Verantius publishes his book Machinae novae, a book of mechanical and technological inventions, some of which are applicable to the solutions of hydrological problems, and others concern the construction of clepsydras, sundials, mills, presses bridges and boats for widely different uses.
- John Speed publishes an edition of his Atlas of Britain, with descriptive text in Latin.
- Pierre Vernier is employed, with his father, in making fine-scale maps of France (Franche-Comté area).
- Danish natural philosopher Ole Worm collects materials that will later be incorporated into his museum in Copenhagen. His museum is the nucleus of the University of Copenhagen Zoological Museum.
- Isaac Beeckman, Dutch intellectual and future friend of René Descartes, leaves his candle factory in Zierikzee, to return to Middelburg to study medicine.
- In Sardinia, the Faculty of Medicine and Surgery of the University of Sassari is founded.
- Gian Lorenzo Bernini sculpts Bacchanal: A Faun Teased by Children, at the age of 18 years. This work is now in New York, at the Metropolitan Museum of Art.
- The States of Holland set up a commission to advise them on the problem of Jewish residency and worship. One of the members of the commission is Hugo Grotius, a highly regarded jurist and one of the most important political thinkers of his day.
- Marie Venier (called Laporte) is the first female actress to appear on the stage in Paris.
- Jesuit astronomer Christoph Scheiner becomes the advisor to Archduke Maximilian, brother of Rudolf II, Holy Roman Emperor in Vienna. A lifelong enemy of Galileo, following a dispute over the nature of sunspots, Scheiner is credited with reopening the 1616 accusations against Galileo in 1633.
- Tommaso Campanella's book In Defence of Galileo is written.
- Istanbul's Sultan Ahmed Mosque (also known as the Blue Mosque) is completed during the rule of Ahmed I.
- In Tunis, the mosque of Youssef Deyis is built. Today it has an octagonal minaret crowned with a miniature green-tiled pyramid for a roof.
- Inigo Jones designs the Queen's House at Greenwich, near London.
- Ambrose Barlow, recently graduated from the College of Saint Gregory, Douai, France, and the Royal College of Saint Alban in Valladolid, Spain, enters the Order of Saint Benedict. In 1641 he will be martyred in England.
- John Vaughan, 1st Earl of Carbery is appointed to the post of comptroller, in the newly formed household of Prince Charles in England; Vaughan later claims that serving the Prince has cost him £20,000.

=== 1617 ===
==== January–March ====
- January 5
  - Pocahontas and Tomocomo of the Powhatan Algonquian tribe, in the Virginia colony of America, meet King James I of England as his guests, at the Banqueting House at Whitehall.
  - The Mad Lover, a play by John Fletcher, is given its first performance.
- February 27 – The Treaty of Stolbovo ends the Ingrian War between Sweden and Russia. Sweden gains Ingria and Kexholm.
- March 4 – On Shrove Tuesday, angry rioters burn down London's Cockpit Theatre because of its increase in the price of admission to its plays. Three rioters are killed when the actors at the theater defend themselves.
- March 7 – Francis Bacon is appointed as Lord Keeper of the Great Seal of England and is designated by King James I to serve as regent during the time that the King of England is away from Westminster to travel to Scotland.
- March 21 – Pocahontas (Rebecka Rolfe), daughter of the Chief of the Powhatan Algonquian tribe in the English colony of Virginia and the wife of English colonist John Rolfe, dies of smallpox after an illness of three days contracted as the couple and their son were preparing to return to America. She is buried at Gravesend.

==== April–June ====
- April 14 – Second Battle of Playa Honda: The Spanish navy defeats a Dutch fleet in the Philippines.
- April 19 – The town of Uusikaupunki (Swedish: Nystad, lit. "New Town") was founded by King Gustavus Adolphus of Sweden.
- April 24 – Encouraged by Charles d'Albert, seventeen-year-old Louis XIII, king of France, forces his mother Marie de Medici, who has held de facto power, into retirement and has her favourite, Concino Concini, assassinated.
- May 13 – King James I of England is escorted by the Earl of Home across the border to return to Scotland (where he reigns as King James VI) for the first time since the Union of the Crowns 14 years earlier in 1603. He is given lodging at Home's Dunglass Castle, East Lothian.
- May 22 – Portuguese Christian Missionary João Baptista Machado de Távora is killed, becoming the first of the 205 Martyrs of Japan.
- May 24 – King James VI of Scotland authorizes the Scottish East India Company, led by Lord Glencairn to trade to the East Indies, the Levant, Greenland, Muscovy and all other islands in the north, north-west and north-eastern seas. James VI is advised that the authorization is not in conflict with charters granted by him in his capacity as King James I of England to England's East India Company, the Levant Company, and the Muscovy Company.
- May 26 – Eliya VIII becomes the new Patriarch of the Church of the East and leader of the Christians of Mesopotamia.
- May 27 – In Germany, the Prince-Bishops of Bamberg, Eichstädt and Würzburg, and the Prince-Provost of Ellwangen, withdraw their states from the Catholic League.
- June 5 – Ferdinand II, Archduke of Inner Austria, is elected King of Bohemia. Ferdinand's forceful Catholic counter-reformation causes great unrest, amongst the Protestants and moderates in Bohemia.

==== July–September ====
- July 1 – Willem Schouten and the crew of the Dutch ship Eendracht return to the Netherlands after sailing around the world in two years and 17 days, in what is only the fourth circumnavigation of the globe, and the first since 1588. The expedition had departed from Texel on June 14, 1615 under the command of Jacob Le Maire, who died on December 22, 1616, slightly more than six months before the return to the Netherlands.
- July 29 – The secret Oñate treaty is signed in Vienna between representatives of King Philip III of Spain reached an agreement with the junior Habsburg branch of Archduke Ferdinand II of Austria, the heads of two different branches of the House of Habsburg. Spain's Ambassador to Austria, Íñigo Vélez de Guevara, 7th Count of Oñate signs on behalf of King Philip.
- August 4 – The Sharp Resolution is passed in the States of Holland and West Friesland, authorizing city governments to create their own mercenary armies, the waardgelders, to maintain public order.
- August 8 – King James of England and Scotland returns to England after having spent three months in Scotland, arriving at Wharton, Cumbria.
- August 24 – The "Fruitbearing Society" (Die Fruchtbringende Gesellschaft) of German scholars is founded in Weimar.
- September 1 – The weighing ceremony of Jahangir is described by the first English ambassador to the Mughal court, Sir Thomas Roe.
- September 23 – The Peace of Busza is signed, between the Ottoman Empire and the Polish–Lithuanian Commonwealth.

==== October–December ====
- October 9 – The Treaty of Pavia is signed between Spain and Savoy, under which Savoy returns Monferrato to Mantua.
- October 12 – The coronation ceremony of King Gustav Adolf of Sweden takes place in Stockholm, almost six years after he succeeded to the throne.
- November 17 – A naval battle between the Sicilians and Venetians ends inconclusively.
- November 22 – Mustafa I succeeds Ahmed I, as Sultan of the Ottoman Empire.
- December 15 – Sir Thomas Roe, a representative of England's East India Company, arrives in Ahmedabad at India's Mughal Empire, and seeks an audience with the Emperor, Shah Jahan. The Emperor receives Roe in an audience three weeks later, on January 6.
- December 24 – An unexpected storm strikes off the coast of Finnmark in Norway, sinking 10 ships and drowning at least 40 people. A little more than three years later, Mari Jørgensdatter tells interrogators that she and several other witches caused the storm, prompting the Vardø witch trials.
- December 30 – Lord Clifton is imprisoned at the Tower of London for threatening Francis Bacon, Lord High Chancellor of England. Clifton is prosecuted by the Star Chamber on March 17 and eventually commits suicide in Fleet Prison.

==== Date unknown ====
- At least seven women are sentenced to death by burning for witchcraft, at the Finspång witch trial in Sweden.
- Giambattista Andreini's play The Penitent Magdalene is published in Mantua.
- The Book of Swindles, a collection of short stories on fraud in the late Ming dynasty, is published.

=== 1618 ===
==== January–March ====
- January 6
  - Jahangir, ruler of the Mughal Empire in northern India, gives an audience for the first time to a representative of the British East India Company, receiving Sir Thomas Roe at the capital at Ahmedabad.
  - Ben Jonson's play Pleasure Reconciled to Virtue is given its premiere performance, presented at the Palace of Whitehall in London.
- January 28 – Rules are established for the Ōoku, the section of Edo Castle that housed the Shōgun's consort and his concubines.
- February 18 – Jeong In-hong becomes the new Chief State Councillor (the Yeonguijeong, similar to a Prime Minister) of the Joseon Kingdom in what is now North Korea, after being appointed by the Emperor Gwanghaegun.
- February 26 – Osman II deposes his uncle Mustafa I as Ottoman sultan (until 1622).
- March 8 – Johannes Kepler discovers the third law of planetary motion (after some initial calculations, he soon rejects the idea, but on May 15 confirms the discovery).

==== April–June ====
- April 21 – Spanish-born Jesuit missionary Pedro Páez becomes (probably) the first European to see and describe the source of the Blue Nile in Ethiopia.
- May 23 – The Second Defenestration of Prague – Protestant noblemen hold a mock trial, and throw two direct representatives of Ferdinand II of Germany (Imperial Governors) and their scribe out of a window into a pile of manure, exacerbating a low-key rebellion into the Bohemian Revolt (1618–1621), precipitating the Thirty Years' War into armed conflict, and further polarizing Europe on religious grounds.
- June 14 – Joris Veseler prints the first Dutch newspaper Courante uyt Italien, Duytslandt, &c. in Amsterdam (approximate date).

==== July–September ====
- July 1 – Ferdinand II, a proponent of the Counter-Reformation, is crowned as King of Hungary at a meeting of the Bohemian diet at Pressburg.
- July 3 – Alonso Fajardo de Entenza becomes the new Spanish Governor-General of the Philippines.
- July 20 – Pluto reaches its second most recent aphelion, according to sophisticated mathematical calculations. The next one occurs in 1866, and the following one will occur in 2113.
- July 31 – Lenaert Jacobszoon and the crew of the Dutch East India Company ship Mauritius become the first Europeans to sight what is now the Australian state of Western Australia, landing at the North Cape.
- August 29 – Johan van Oldenbarnevelt and Hugo Grotius are imprisoned by Maurice, Prince of Orange.
- September 4 – Rodi avalanche: A rock- or snowslide buries the Alpine town of Piuro, claiming 2,427 victims.
- September 18 – Beginning of the 13th Baktun, in the Mesoamerican Long Count calendar (12.0.0.0.0).
- September 19 – The Siege of Pilsen begins as the first major battle of the Thirty Years' War, as Bohemian Protestants lay siege to the Bohemian Catholic city and lasts for more than two months.
- September 28 – The Battle of Orynin takes place. Polish and Lithuanian Army forces fail to stop an invasion by Crimean Tatars, who then proceed in burning villages in Lithuania and enslaving residents.

==== October–December ====
- October 9 – Residents of Mogilev revolt against Uniate bishop Josaphat Kuntsevych.
- October 29 – English adventurer, writer and courtier Sir Walter Raleigh is beheaded at the Palace of Westminster, for allegedly conspiring treasonably against James I of England in 1603, following pressure from the Spanish government, over his attack on their settlement on the Orinoco, on his last (1617–18) voyage.
- November 13 – The Synod of Dort has its first meeting.
- November 21 – Pilsen falls to Bohemian Protestants led by Ernst von Mansfeld after more than two months of deprivation of food.
- December 11 – Russia and Poland sign the Truce of Deulino.

==== Date unknown ====
- The margraves of Brandenburg are granted Polish approval to inherit the Duchy of Prussia, creating the state of Brandenburg-Prussia.
- The 3,000 seat Teatro Farnese, the first permanent proscenium theatre, is built into the Great Hall of the Palazzo della Pilotta in Parma, Italy.
- The Ming Chinese embassy of the Wanli Emperor presents tea to the Russian tsar.

=== 1619 ===
==== January– March ====
- January 12 – James I of England's Banqueting House, Whitehall in London is destroyed by fire. Inigo Jones is commissioned to design a replacement.
- February 14 – Earthquake flattens the town of Trujillo, Peru, killing hundreds in the town and causing landslides in the surrounding countryside killing hundreds more.
- March 20 – Matthias, Holy Roman Emperor dies, leaving the Holy Roman Empire without an official leader, to deal with the Bohemian Revolt.

==== April–June ====
- April 18 – Battle of Sarhu: Manchu leader Nurhaci is victorious over the Ming forces.
- May 8 – The Synod of Dort has its final meeting.
- May 13
  - Dutch statesman Johan van Oldenbarnevelt is executed in The Hague, after having been convicted of treason.
  - Anne of Denmark, queen consort of England, is buried at Westminster Abbey.
- May 30 – Jan Pieterszoon Coen, Governor General of the Dutch East Indies, conquers Jayakarta, and renames it Batavia.
- June 10 – Thirty Years' War – Battle of Sablat: Protestant forces are defeated.
- June 21 – Dulwich College founded by Edward Alleyn, in Dulwich, London.

==== July–September ====
- July 30 – In Jamestown, Virginia, the first English-speaking representative assembly in the Americas, the Virginia General Assembly (later named House of Burgesses), convenes for the first time.
- August 5 – Thirty Years' War: Battle of Věstonice – Bohemian forces defeat the Austrians.
- August 10 – The Treaty of Angoulême ends the civil war between Louis XIII of France and his mother, Marie de' Medici.
- August 20 – A group "twenty and odd" enslaved Africans, onboard the privateer ship White Lion (the first in the state of Virginia), are landed at Point Comfort in colonial Virginia.
- August 26 – Frederick V of the Palatinate is elected King of Bohemia by the states of the Bohemian Confederacy.
- August 28 – Ferdinand II, Archduke of Austria and King of Bohemia, is elected Holy Roman Emperor unanimously by the prince-electors.
- September 5 – In the course of a revolt against the Habsburg Empire, Prince Gabriel Bethlen of Transylvania (now in Romania) conquers Kassa (now Košice in Slovakia) with the help of George I Rákóczi.
- September 7 – Gaj Singh Rathore becomes the new Raja of Marwar (within the Mughal Empire) at Jodhpur in what is now the Indian state of Rajasthan, succeeding his father, Sur Singh.
- September 9 – The coronation of Ferdinand II takes place in Vienna.
- September 18 (7 Thout 1336 on the Coptic calendar) – Abba Yoannis El-Mallawany of Egypt becomes the new head of the Coptic Christian Church as Pope John XV of Alexandria succeeding the late Pope Mark V, who died on September 11.

==== October–December ====
- October 8 – Thirty Years' War – The Treaty of Munich is signed by Ferdinand II and Maximilian I, Elector of Bavaria.
- November 10 – While stationed along the Danube river with Bavarian troops, René Descartes, according to his biographer Adrien Baillet, has a series of dreams giving him the idea of applying the mathematical method to philosophy.
- November 16 – William Parker School, Hastings, England, is founded by the will of Reverend William Parker.
- November 23 – Thirty Years' War– Battle of Humenné: Polish Lisowczycy troops assist the Holy Roman Emperor by defeating a Transylvanian force, forcing Gabor Bethlen to raise his siege of Vienna.
- December 4 – Thirty-eight colonists from England disembark in Berkeley Hundred, Virginia from the Margaret of Bristol and have a day of celebration to give thanks to God, in what is considered by some historians to be the first Thanksgiving in the Americas.

==== Date unknown ====
- Jahangir grants a British mission important commercial concessions at Surat, on the west coast of India.
- Salé Rovers declare the port of Salé on the Barbary Coast to be the Republic of Salé, independent of the Sultan of Morocco, with the Dutch-born corsair Jan Janszoon as president.
- The Danish–Dutch whaling settlement of Smeerenburg is founded in Svalbard.
- An expedition in Sri Lanka, led by Filipe de Oliveira, deposes and executes the last Jaffna king (Cankili II), putting an end to the Jaffna Kingdom.
- A Spanish expedition sails around Tierra del Fuego, mapping the coast and discovering the Diego Ramírez Islands.

== Births ==
1610

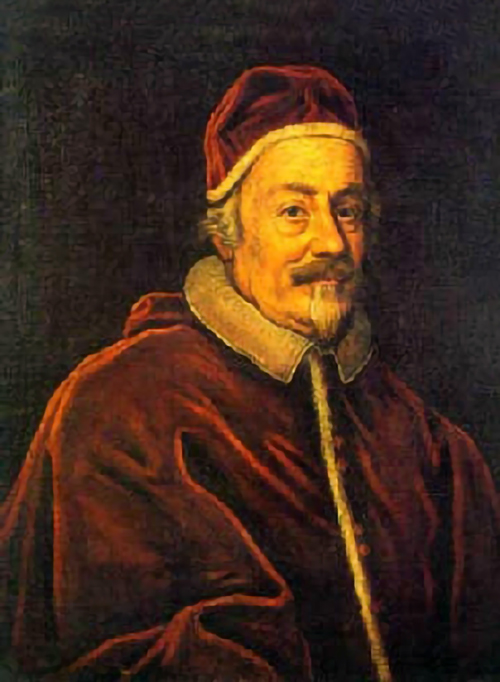
Pope Alexander VIII

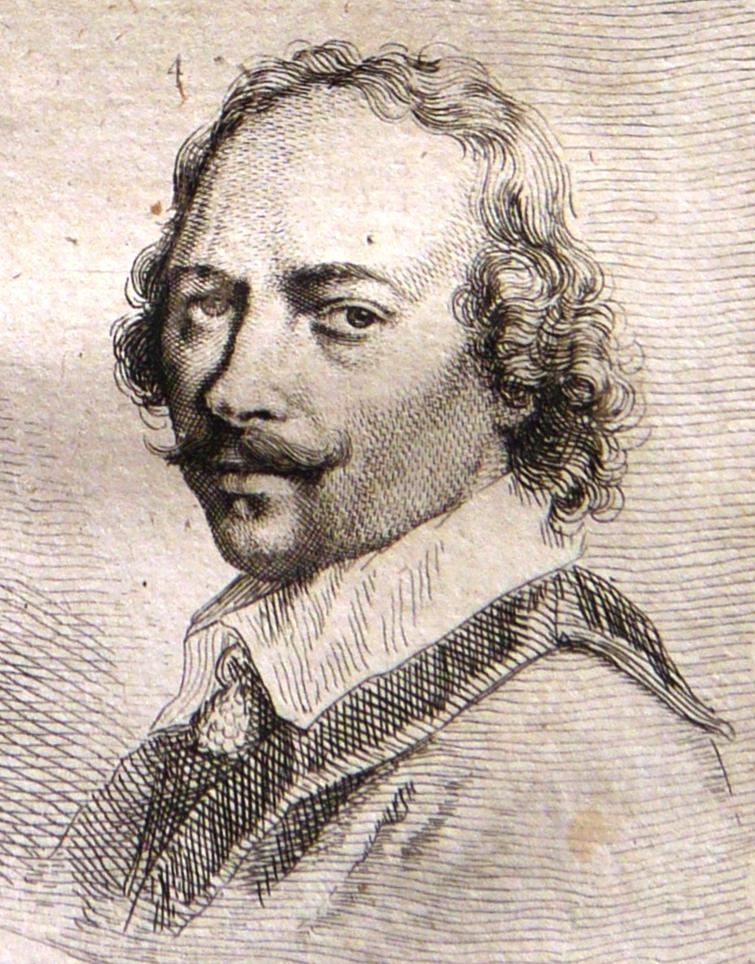
Hendrik Martenszoon Sorgh

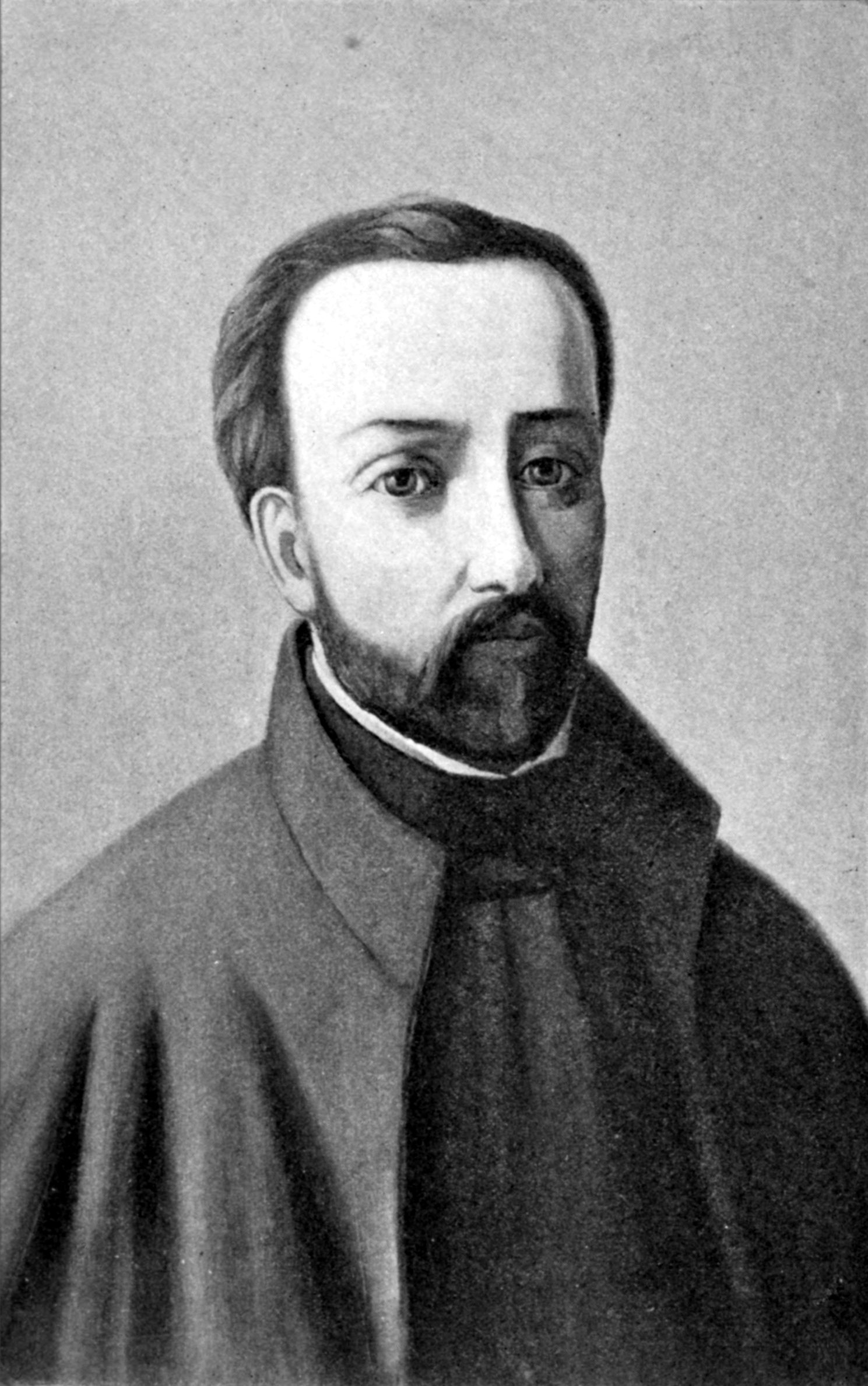
Gabriel Lalemant

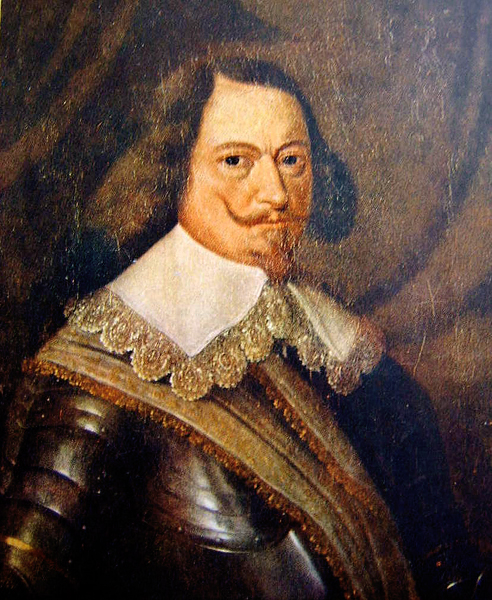
Jacob Kettler

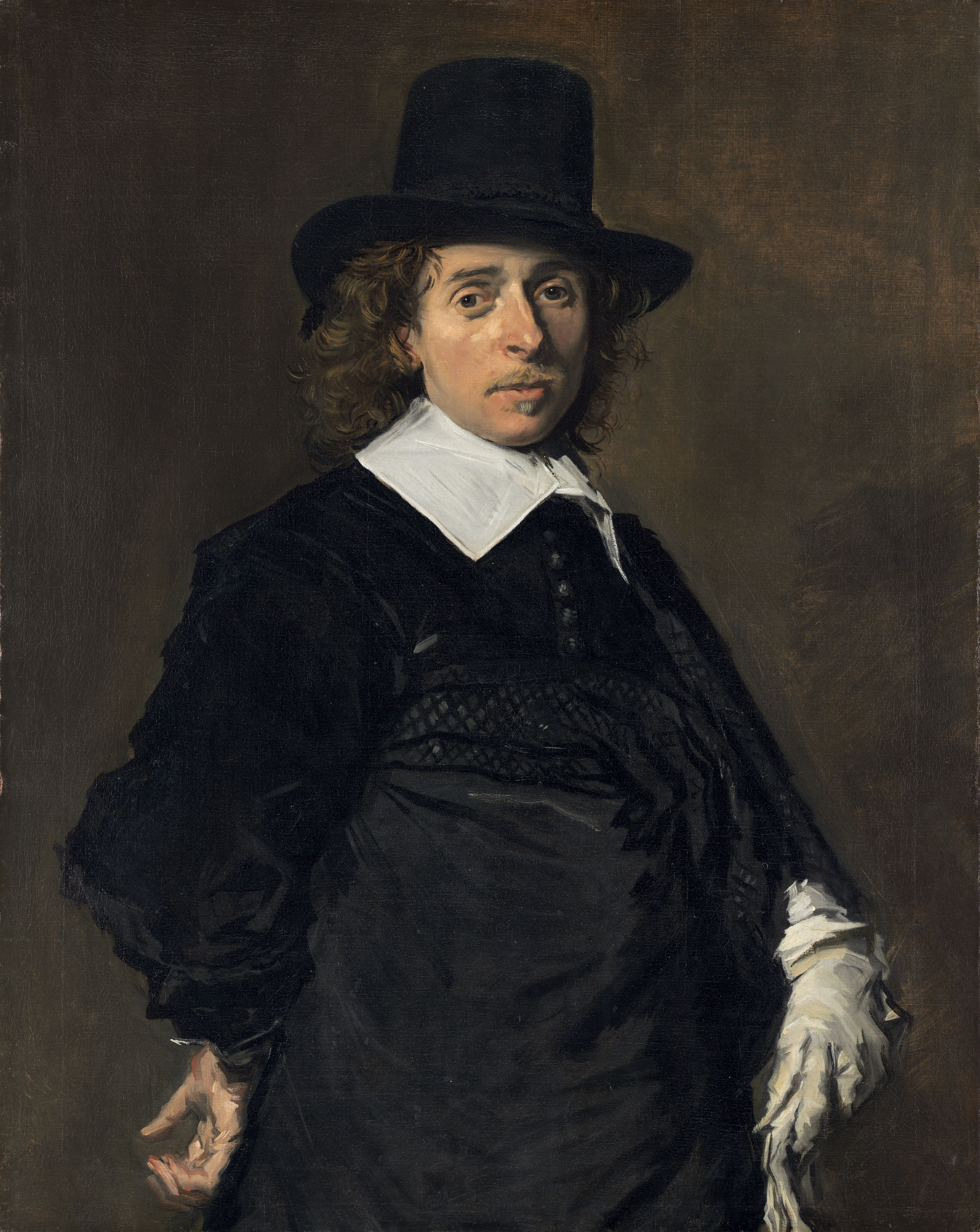
Adriaen van Ostade

- January 9 – George Wilde, Irish bishop (d. 1665)
- January 10 – Louis Maimbourg, French Jesuit historian (d. 1686)
- January 12 – Reinhold Curicke, jurist and historian from Danzig (d. 1667)
- January 13 – Archduchess Maria Anna of Austria, Electress of Bavaria (d. 1665)
- January 21 – Elizabeth Fones, American settler (d. 1673)
- January 26 – Henry Hildyard, English Member of Parliament (d. 1674)
- February 2
  - Francisco Ignacio Alcina, Jesuit missionary and historian (d. 1674)
  - Pierre Bourdelot, French physician (d. 1685)
  - Edmund Weaver, English politician (d. 1672)
- February 11 – Salomon Idler, German inventor (d. 1669)
- February 13 – Jean de Labadie, French pietist (d. 1674)
- February 14 – Solomon Swale, English politician (d. 1678)
- March 3 – Pierre Dupuis, French painter (d. 1682)
- March 4 (bapt.) – William Dobson, English portraitist and painter (d. 1646)
- March 14
  - Frederick Cornwallis, 1st Baron Cornwallis, English politician (d. 1662)
  - Simon Louis, Count of Lippe-Detmolt (1627–1636) (d. 1636)
- April 22 – Pope Alexander VIII (d. 1691)
- May 12 – Arent Berntsen, Norwegian statistician (d. 1680)
- May 17 – Joseph Poncet, French missionary (d. 1675)
- May 18 – Stefano della Bella, Italian printmaker (d. 1664)
- June 1 – Hendrik Martenszoon Sorgh, Dutch painter (d. 1670)
- June 17 – Birgitte Thott, Danish scholar, writer and translator (b. 1662)
- June 24 – Thomas Hales, Connecticut settler (d. 1679)
- July 2 – Francis Browne, 3rd Viscount Montagu in the Peerage of England (d. 1682)
- July 6 – Hugh Forth, English politician (d. 1676)
- July 8 (bapt.) – Richard Deane, English military commander and regicide (d. 1653)
- July 11 – William Widdrington, 1st Baron Widdrington, English landowner, politician (d. 1651)
- July 14 – Ferdinando II de' Medici, Grand Duke of Tuscany (d. 1670)
- July 18 – Antonio de Solís y Ribadeneyra, Spanish dramatist and historian (d. 1686)
- July 28 (bapt.) – Henry Glapthorne, English dramatist (d. c.1643)
- July 30 – Lorens von der Linde, Swedish field marshal (d. 1670)
- August 2 – Edward Master, English politician (d. 1691)
- August 4 – Cornelis Evertsen the Elder, Dutch admiral (d. 1666)
- August 23 – Susanna Margarete of Anhalt-Dessau, Princess of Anhalt-Dessau (d. 1663)
- September 4 – Giovanni Andrea Sirani, Italian painter (d. 1670)
- September 6
  - Francesco I d'Este, Duke of Modena, Italian noble (d. 1658)
  - Luke Robinson, English politician (d. 1669)
  - David Wemyss, 2nd Earl of Wemyss, Scottish earl (d. 1679)
- September 10 – Sir Edward Seymour, 3rd Baronet, Member of Parliament (d. 1688)
- September 24 – Huang Zongxi, Chinese political theorist, philosopher, naturalist, writer and soldier (d. 1695)
- September 28 – Henry Hastings, 1st Baron Loughborough, English Royalist army commander in the English Civil War (d. 1666)
- September 29 – Gabriel Druillettes, French missionary (d. 1681)
- October 3 – Gabriel Lalemant, Jesuit missionary in New France, beginning in 1646 (d. 1649)
- October 6 – Charles de Sainte-Maure, duc de Montausier, French soldier, the governor of the Louis (d. 1690)
- October 19 – James Butler, 1st Duke of Ormonde, Anglo-Irish statesman and soldier (d. 1688)
- October 28 – Jacob Kettler, German noble (d. 1682)
- November 8 – Pietro Vidoni, Italian Catholic cardinal (d. 1681)
- November 20 – Henry Heyman, English politician (d. 1658)
- November 22 – Duchess Marie Elisabeth of Saxony (d. 1684)
- November 28 – Augustine Warner, Virginia planter, politician (d. 1674)
- December 9 – Baldassare Ferri, Italian castrato singer (d. 1680)
- December 10 – Adriaen van Ostade, Dutch painter (d. 1685)
- December 15 – David Teniers the Younger, Flemish artist born in Antwerp (d. 1690)
- December 18 – Charles du Fresne, sieur du Cange, French philologist and historian (d. 1688)
- December 25
  - David Christiani, German mathematician and philosopher (d. 1688)
  - Charles Howard, 3rd Earl of Nottingham, son of Charles Howard (d. 1681)
- December 28 – Basil of Ostrog, Serbian Orthodox bishop venerated as Saint Vasilije (d. 1671)
- Dirck Rembrantsz van Nierop, Dutch astronomer and cartographer (d. 1682)
- Maria Cunitz, Silesian astronomer (d. 1664)
- Li Yu, Chinese writer (d. 1680)
- François Eudes de Mézeray, French historian (d. 1683)
- Karin Thomasdotter, Finnish official (d. 1697)
- Emmanuel Tzanes, Greek painter (d. 1690)
- Marie Meurdrac, French chemist and alchemist (d. 1680)
- Leonora Duarte, Flemish composer and musician (d. 1678)
- George Carteret, Jersey-born English Royalist statesman (d. 1680)
- Jeremias de Dekker, Dutch poet (d. 1666)
- Abraham Duquesne, French naval officer (d. 1688)
- Jin Shengtan, Chinese editor (d. 1661)

1611

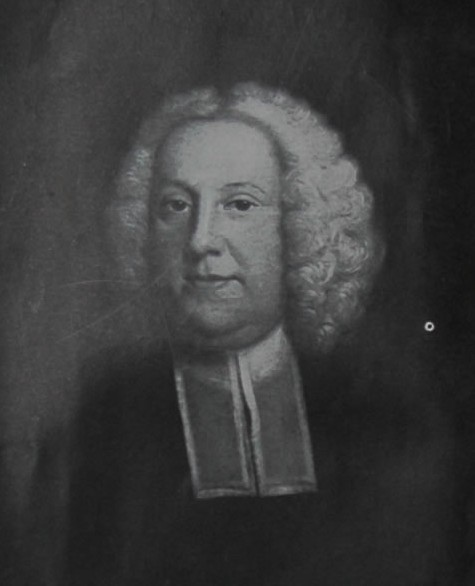
John Pell

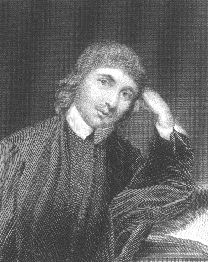
William Cartwright

- January 3 – James Harrington, English political theorist of classical republicanism (d. 1677)
- January 5 – Tsarevich Ivan Dmitriyevich, pretender to the Russian throne (k. 1614)
- January 28 – Johannes Hevelius, Polish astronomer (d. 1687)
- February 2 – Ulrik of Denmark, Danish prince-bishop (d. 1633)
- February 3 – Christian Ulrik Gyldenløve, Danish diplomat and military officer (d. 1640)
- February 5 (bapt.) – Philip Sherman, English-born founder of Rhode Island (d. 1687)
- February 6 – Chongzhen Emperor of China (d. 1644)
- February 19 – Andries de Graeff, Dutch politician (d. 1678)
- February 24? (bapt. March 4) – William Dobson, English portrait painter (d. 1646)
- February 28 – William Brereton, 2nd Baron Brereton, English politician (d. 1664)
- March 1 – John Pell, English mathematician (d. 1685)
- March 9 – Pierre-Joseph-Marie Chaumonot, French missionary (d. 1693)
- March 15 – Jan Fyt, Flemish Baroque painter (d. 1661)
- March 17 – Robert Douglas, Count of Skenninge, Swedish field marshal (d. 1662)
- March 25 – Evliya Çelebi, Ottoman Turk, travels around the Ottoman Empire for 40 years (d. 1682)
- March 28
  - Magdalena Elisabeth of Hanau, German noblewoman (d. 1687)
  - Henry Sherburne, American colonist (d. 1680)
- April 11 – Karl Eusebius, Prince of Liechtenstein (d. 1684)
- April 17 – Simone Pignoni, Italian painter (d. 1698)
- May 4 – Carlo Rainaldi, Italian architect (d. 1691)
- May 16 – Pope Innocent XI (d. 1689)
- May 19 – Joachim Irgens von Westervick, Dano–Norwegian noble (d. 1675)
- June 15 – Salomon Sweers, Dutch businessman (d. 1674)
- June 22 – Pablo Bruna, blind Spanish composer and organist (d. 1679)
- June 24 – Johan Oxenstierna, Swedish count and statesman (d. 1657)
- June 28 – Robert Rich, 3rd Earl of Warwick, English noble (d. 1659)
- July 15 – Jai Singh I, Maharaja of Jaipur (d. 1667)
- July 16 – Cecilia Renata of Austria, queen consort of Poland (d. 1644)
- July 21 – Jan van Balen, Flemish painter (d. 1654)
- July 23 – Henry Hungerford, English politician (d. 1673)
- July 24 – Giancarlo de' Medici, Italian Catholic cardinal (d. 1663)
- August 4 – Jan van den Hoecke, Dutch painter (d. 1651)
- August 9 – Henry of Nassau-Siegen, German count, officer in the Dutch Army, diplomat for the Dutch Republic (d. 1652)
- September 1 – William Cartwright, English dramatist (d. 1643)
- September 3 – Toussaint Rose, French writer (d. 1701)
- September 4 – George III of Brieg, Duke of Brzeg (1633–1664) (d. 1664)
- September 8 – Johann Friedrich Gronovius, German classical scholar (d. 1671)
- September 11 – Henri de la Tour d'Auvergne, Vicomte de Turenne (d. 1675)
- September 17 – Johann Olearius, German hymnwriter (d. 1684)
- October 1 – Mathias Balen, Dutch writer (d. 1691)
- October 11
  - Samuel Enys, English politician (d. 1697)
  - Hugues de Lionne, French statesman (d. 1671)
- October 22 – Jacques Esprit, French writer (d. 1677)
- October 26
  - Ove Bjelke, Norwegian civil servant (d. 1674)
  - Antonio Coello, Spanish dramatist and poet (d. 1652)
- November 1
  - François-Marie, comte de Broglie, French soldier and commander in the Thirty Years' War (d. 1656)
  - Walter J. Johnson, English explorer and fur trader (d. 1703)
- November 12 – Joachim Gersdorff, Danish politician (d. 1661)
- November 18 – Andreas Tscherning, German poet (d. 1659)
- December 23 – Abraham Wright, English theological writer and deacon (d. 1690)
- December – Leonora Baroni, Italian singer (d. 1670)
- Diego Quispe Tito, Peruvian painter (d. 1681)
- Charles de Batz-Castelmore d'Artagnan, French count and musketeer, on whom the fictional character from the novel The Three Musketeers is based (d. 1673)

1612

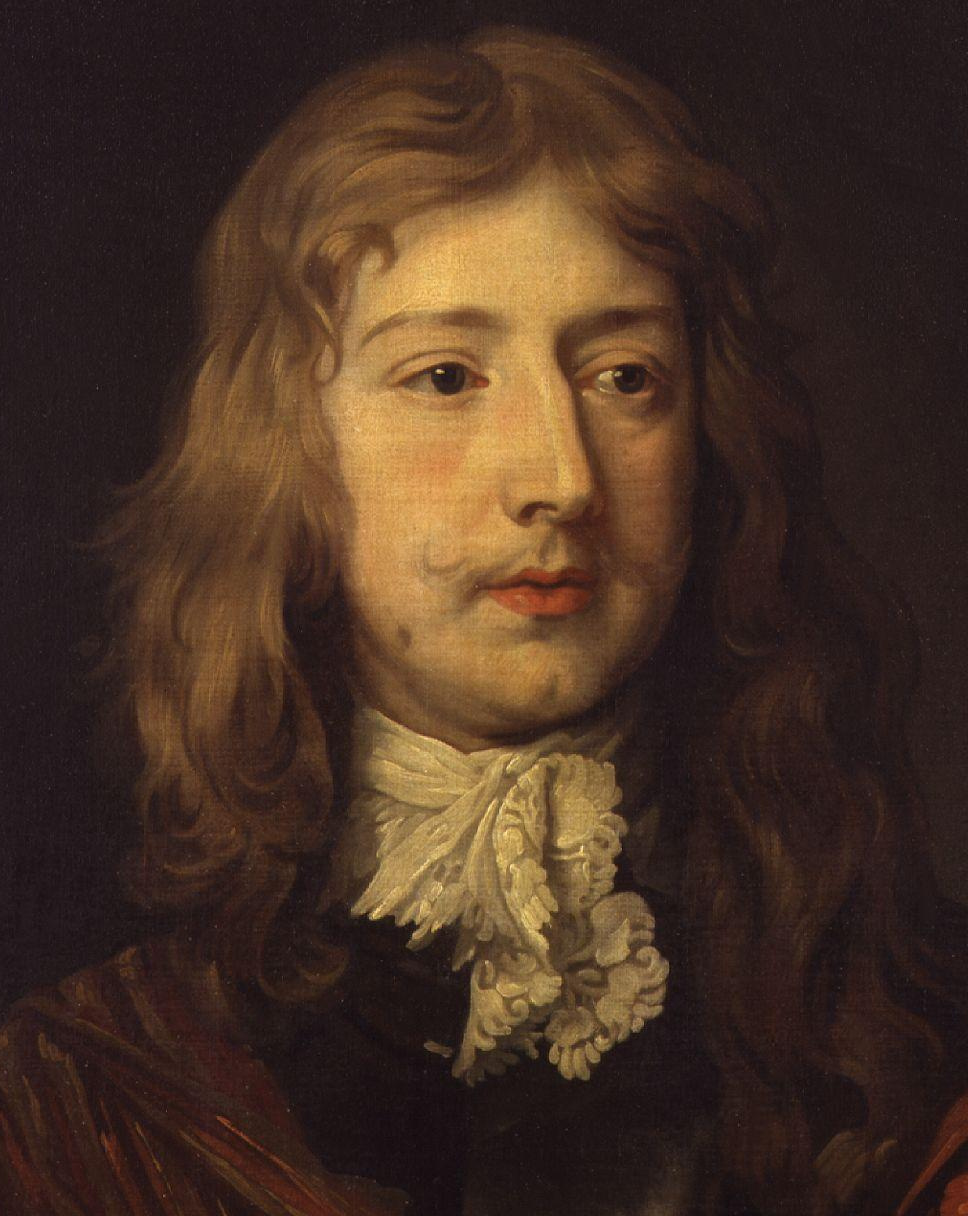
Thomas Killigrew

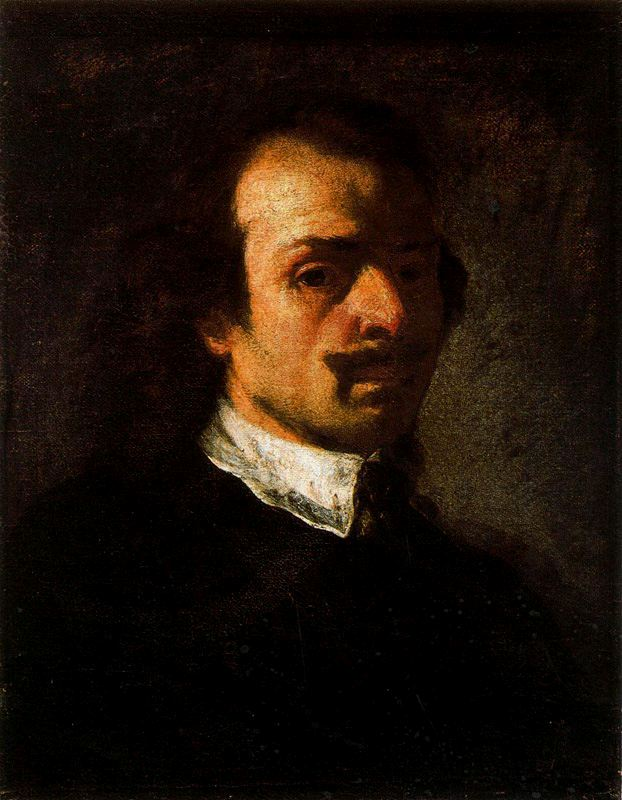
Pier Francesco Mola

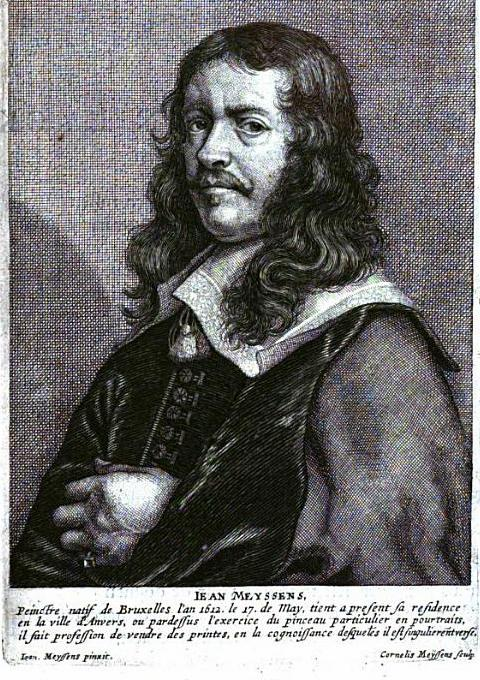
Joannes Meyssens

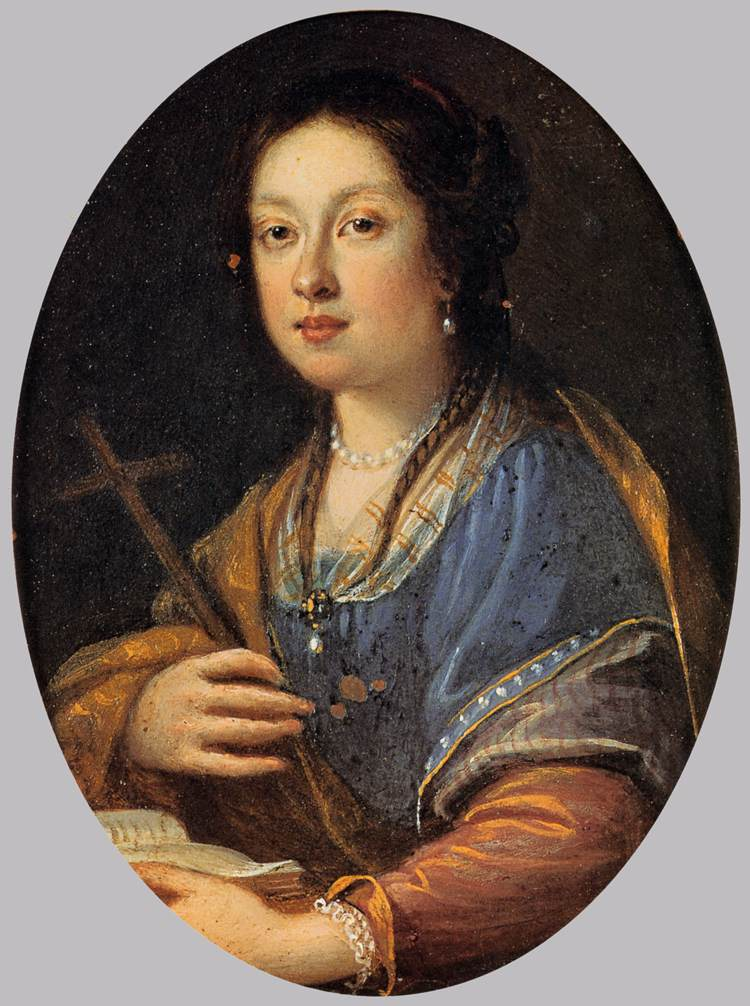
Margherita de' Medici

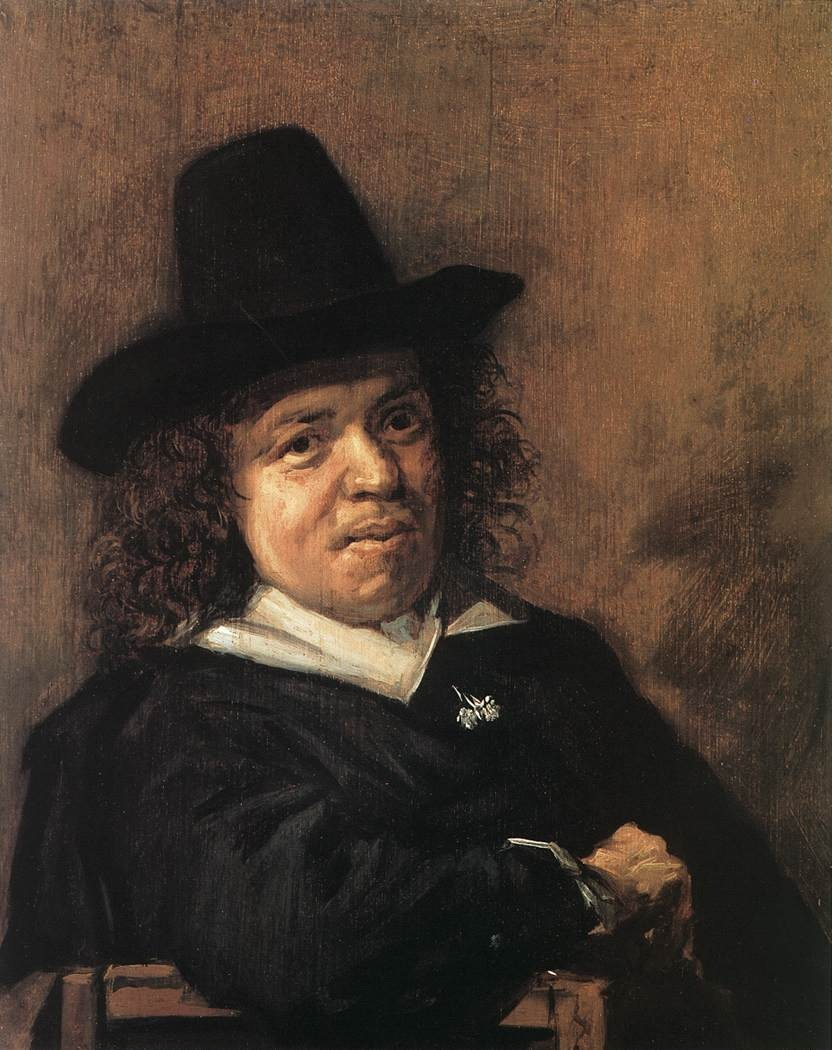
Frans Post

- January 17 – Thomas Fairfax, English Civil War general (d. 1671)
- January 21 – Henry Casimir I of Nassau-Dietz, Stadtholder of Groningen, Friesland and Drenthe (d. 1640)
- January 22 – Daniel Zwicker, German physician (d. 1678)
- January 23 – George FitzGerald, 16th Earl of Kildare, Irish earl (d. 1660)
- February 1 – William West, English politician (d. 1670)
- February 2 – Thomas Wentworth, 5th Baron Wentworth, English baron and politician (d. 1665)
- February 4 – Arthur Spry, English politician (d. 1685)
- February 5 – Crown Prince Sohyeon, Korean crown prince (d. 1645)
- February 6 – Antoine Arnauld, French theologian (d. 1694)
- February 7 – Thomas Killigrew, English dramatist and theatre manager (d. 1683)
- February 9 – Pier Francesco Mola, Italian painter of the High Baroque (d. 1666)
- February 15 – Paul de Chomedey, Sieur de Maisonneuve, French military officer, founder of Montreal in New France (d. 1676)
- February 20 – Richard Olmsted, Connecticut settler (d. 1687)
- February 21 – Lorenzo Imperiali, Italian cardinal (d. 1673)
- February 22 (bapt.) – George Digby, 2nd Earl of Bristol, English statesman (d. 1677)
- March 20 – Anne Bradstreet, née Dudley, English-born American Puritan poet (d. 1672)
- April 6 – James Stewart, 1st Duke of Richmond (d. 1655)
- April 10 – Francesco Lorenzo Brancati di Lauria, Italian Catholic cardinal (d. 1693)
- April 12 – Simone Cantarini, Italian painter and engraver (d. 1648)
- April 28 – Odoardo Farnese, Duke of Parma and Piacenza from 1622 to 1646 (d. 1646)
- May 6 – François-Joseph Bressani, Italian missionary (d. 1672)
- May 10 – Francesco Palliola, Italian Servant of God (d. 1648)
- May 12 – Laurence Womock, English Bishop of St David's (d. 1687)
- May 17
  - Matthew Babington, English politician (d. 1669)
  - Joannes Meyssens, Flemish painter (d. 1670)
- May 26 – Raja Wodeyar II, King of Mysore (d. 1638)
- May 31 – Margherita de' Medici, Italian noble (d. 1679)
- June 1 – Frans Post, Dutch painter (d. 1680)
- June 23 – André Tacquet, Brabantian mathematician, Jesuit priest (d. 1660)
- June 25 – John Albert Vasa, Polish bishop (d. 1634)
- June 29 – Sir William Bowyer, 1st Baronet, English politician (d. 1679)
- July 23 – Christian Lupus, Flemish historian (d. 1681)
- July 27 – Murad IV, Ottoman Sultan (d. 1640)
- August 2 – Saskia van Uylenburgh, wife of painter Rembrandt van Rijn (d. 1642)
- August 10 – Charles de Grimaldi-Régusse, French aristocrat (d. 1687)
- August 12 – Allart Pieter van Jongestall, Dutch jurist, politician, and diplomat (d. 1676)
- August 17 – Jeremi Wiśniowiecki, Polish nobleman (d. 1651)
- August 23 – Francis Lascelles, English politician (d. 1667)
- August 28 – Marcus Zuerius van Boxhorn, Dutch scholar (d. 1653)
- September 1 – Nicolas Chorier, French historian, lawyer and writer (d. 1692)
- September 24 – William Gawdy, English politician (d. 1669)
- October 6
  - Claude Françoise de Lorraine, Princess of Lorraine (d. 1648)
  - Louis Maracci, Italian priest (d. 1700)
- October 14
  - Pierre Bailloquet, French missionary (d. 1692)
  - Thomas Fitch, Connecticut settler (d. 1704)
- October 18 – John Eliot, English politician (d. 1685)
- October 19 – Nicolas Chaperon, French painter (d. 1656)
- October 20 – Richard Boyle, 1st Earl of Burlington, Anglo-Irish nobleman, Lord High Treasurer of Ireland, Cavalier (d. 1698)
- October 23 – Henry Lingen, English politician (d. 1662)
- October 25 – James Graham, 1st Marquess of Montrose, Scottish soldier (d. 1650)
- October 26 – Henry Wilmot, 1st Earl of Rochester (d. 1658)
- October 27 – Margravine Magdalene Sibylle of Brandenburg-Bayreuth, Electress of Saxony by marriage (1656–1680) (d. 1687)
- October 30 – Paul Würtz, Swedish general (d. 1676)
- November 7 – Pierre Mignard, French painter (d. 1695)
- November 11
  - Jean Garnier, French historian (d. 1681)
  - August Philipp, Duke of Schleswig-Holstein-Sonderburg-Beck, Danish-German prince and member of the House of Oldenburg (d. 1675)
  - Richard Sherlock, English priest (d. 1689)
- November 17 – Dorgon, Chinese Manchu prince (d. 1650)
- November 28 – Sir Thomas Whitmore, 1st Baronet, English politician and Baronet (d. 1653)
- December 2 – David Ryckaert III, Flemish painter (d. 1661)

1613

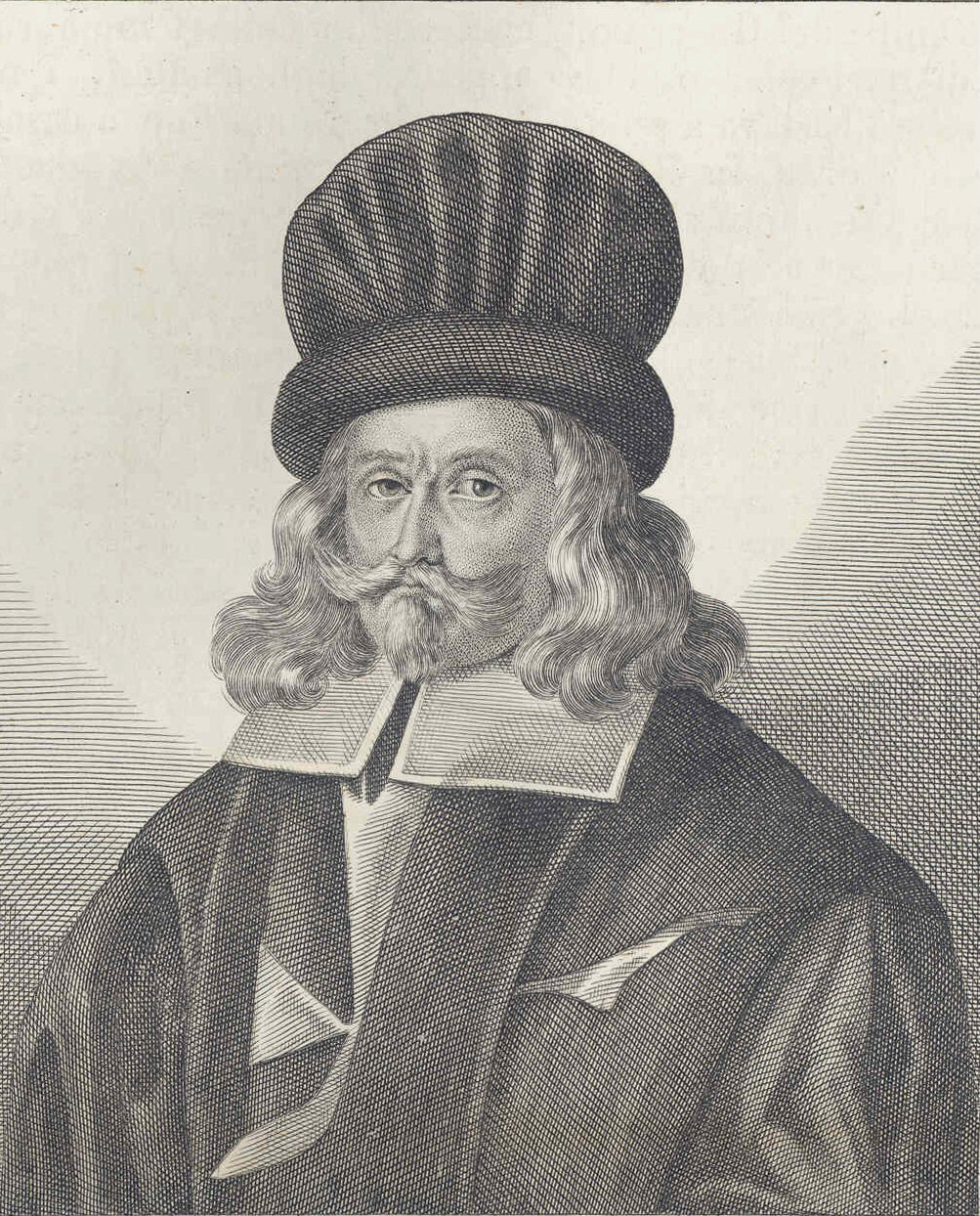
Mattia Preti

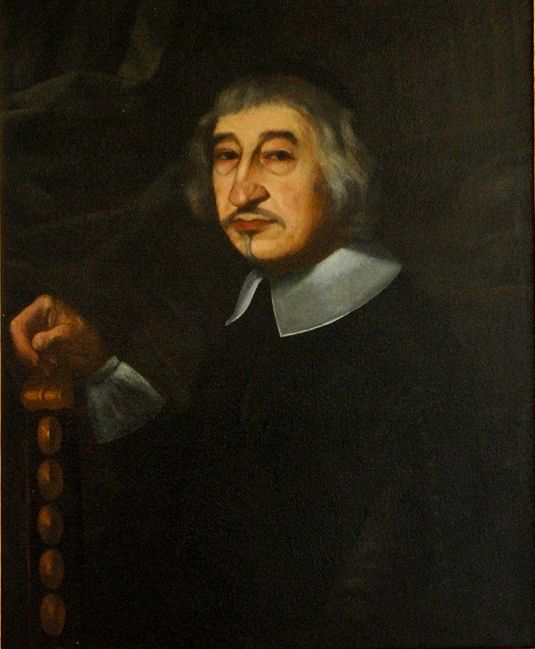
Stjepan Gradić

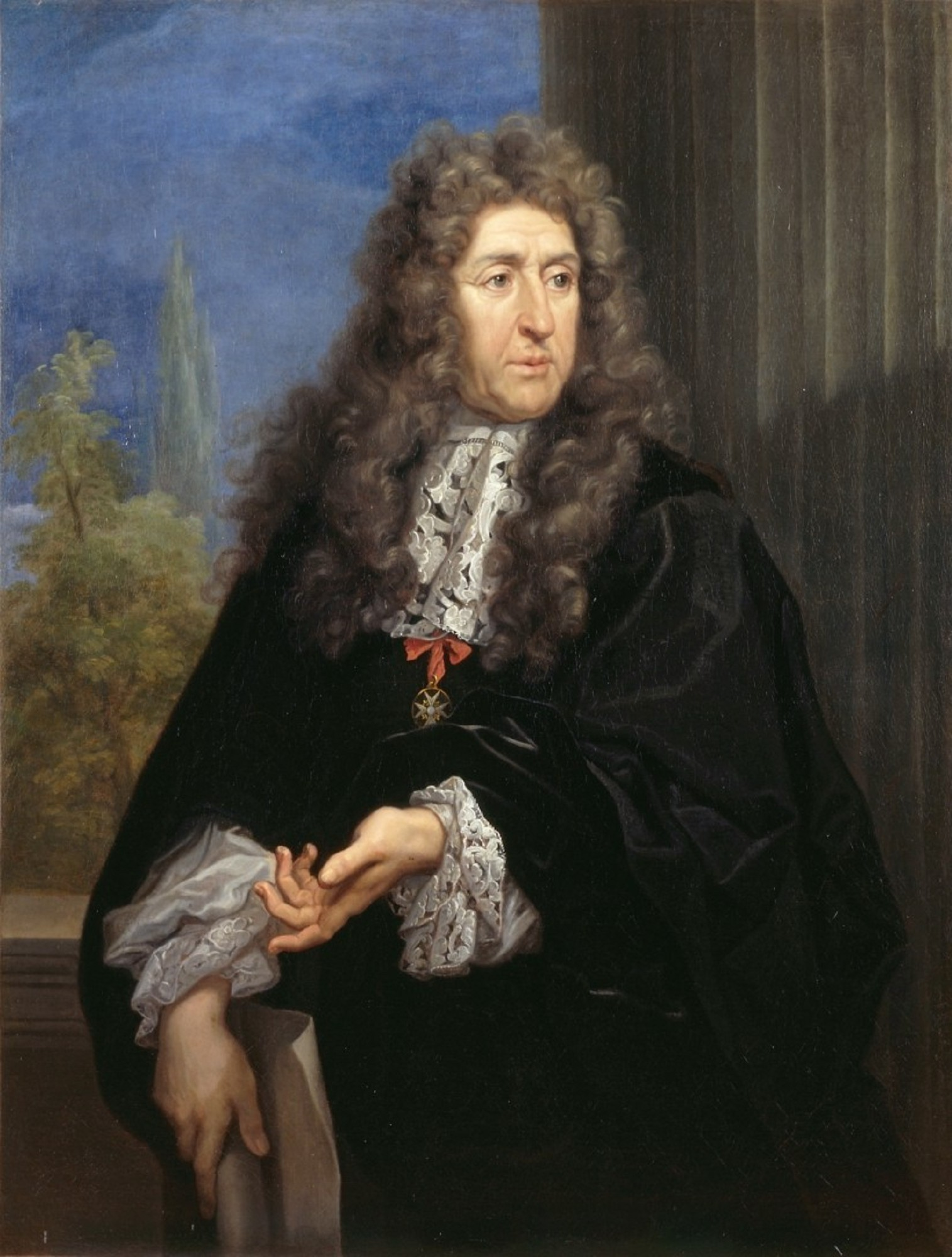
André Le Nôtre

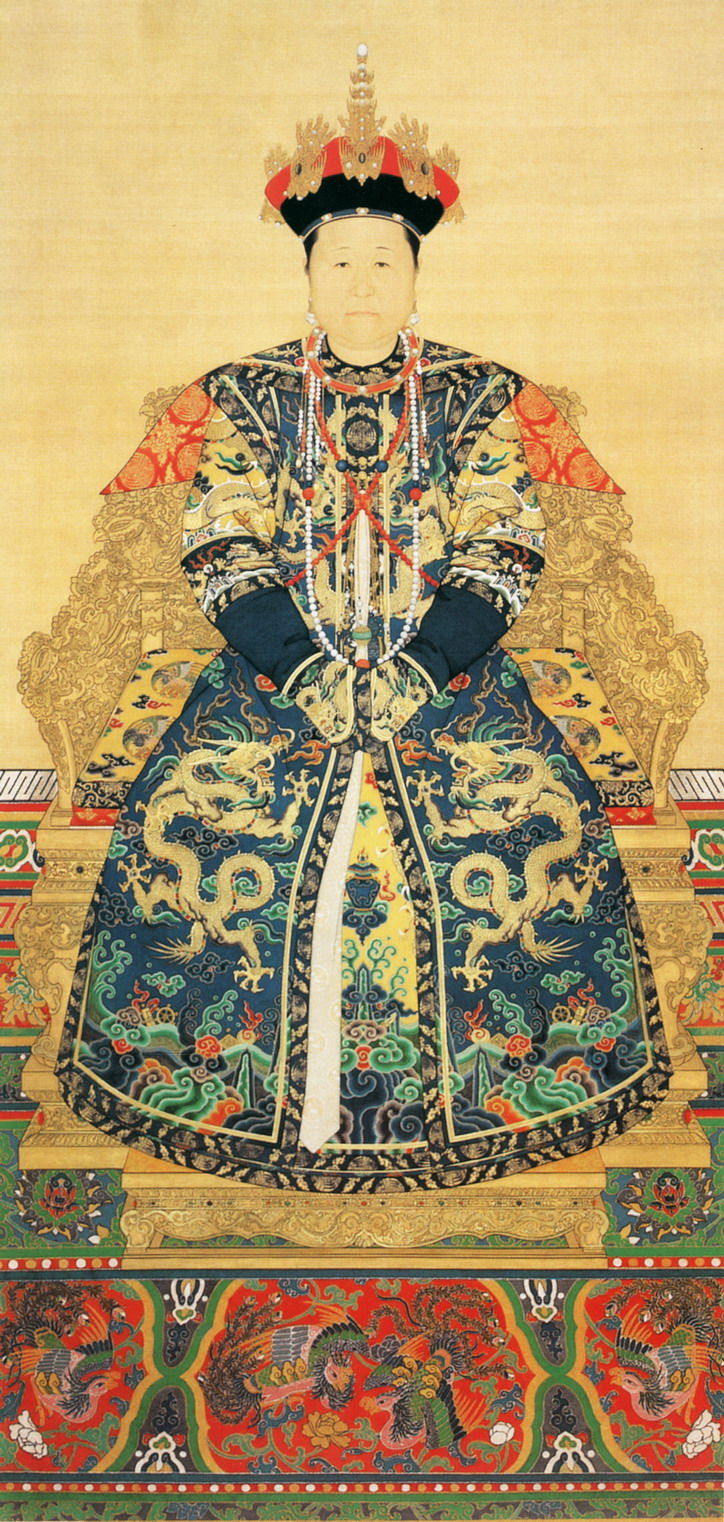
Empress Dowager Xiaozhuang

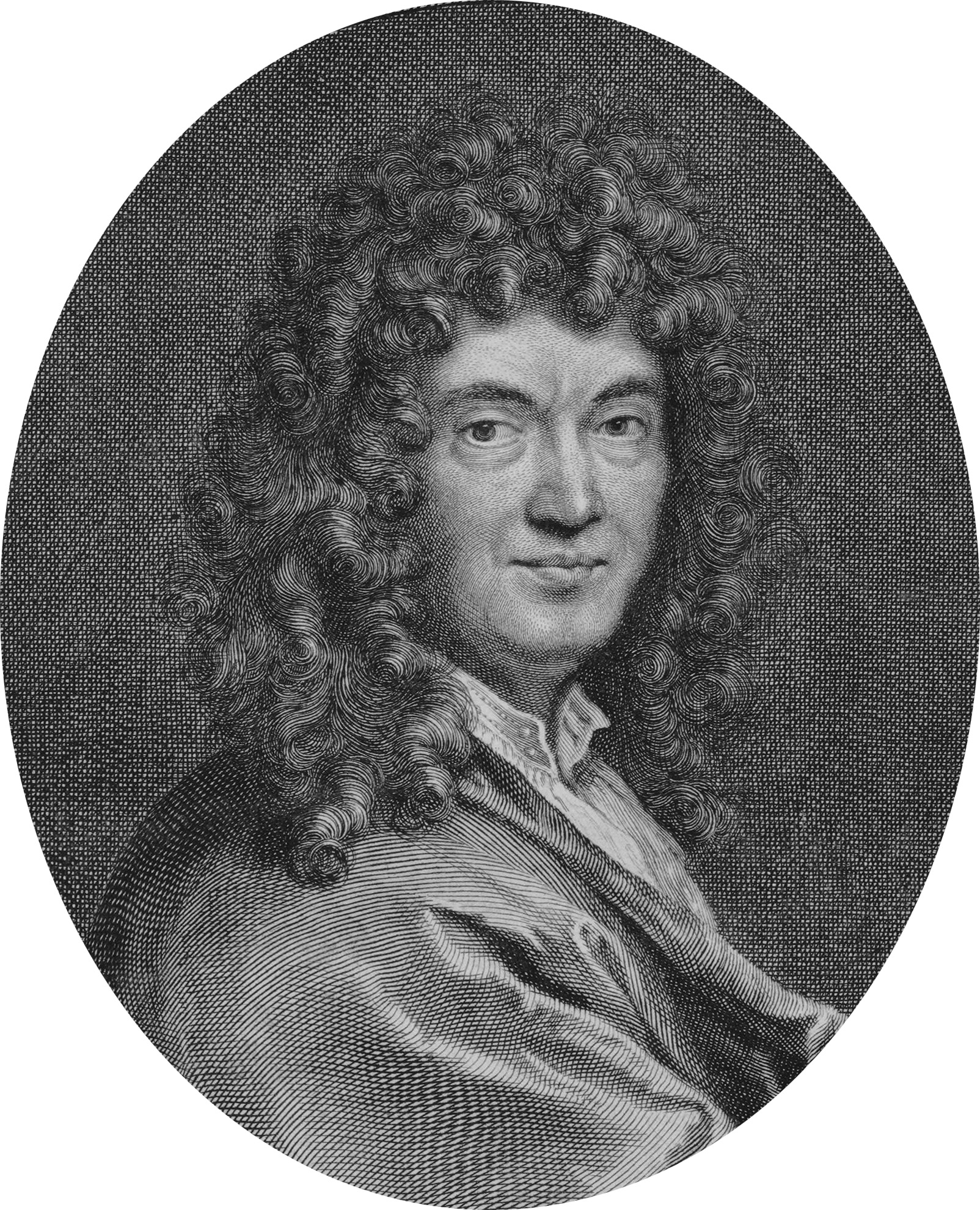
Claude Perrault

- January 14 – Pier Martire Armani, Italian painter (d. 1699)
- January 15 – Giovanni Pietro Bellori, Italian art historian (d. 1696)
- January 21 – George Gillespie, Scottish theologian (d. 1648)
- February 2
  - Noël Chabanel, French Jesuit missionary at Sainte-Marie among the Hurons (d. 1649)
  - William Thomas, Welsh Anglican bishop (d. 1689)
- February 7 – Johannes Musaeus, German theologian (d. 1681)
- February 24 – Mattia Preti, Italian painter (d. 1699)
- February 28 – John Pearson, English theologian and scholar (d. 1686)
- March 6
  - Stjepan Gradić, Croatian philosopher and scientist (d. 1683)
  - Anna Moroni, Italian educator (d. 1675)
- March 11 – Francesco Caetani, 8th Duke of Sermoneta, Governor of the Duchy of Milan (d. 1683)
- March 12 – André Le Nôtre, French landscape and garden designer (d. 1700)
- March 19 – John Swinfen, English politician (d. 1694)
- March 24 – Antonia of Württemberg, princess, literary figure, patron and Christian Kabbalist (d. 1679)
- March 28 – Empress Dowager Xiaozhuang, concubine of Qing dynasty ruler Hong Taiji (d. 1688)
- March 29 – Louis-Isaac Lemaistre de Sacy, French Bible translator (d. 1684)
- April 1
  - Giulio Bartolocci, Italian Biblical scholar (d. 1687)
  - Charles de Saint-Évremond, French soldier and writer (d. 1703)
- April 7 – Gerrit Dou, Dutch painter (d. 1675)
- April 18 – Philip Wharton, 4th Baron Wharton, English soldier (d. 1696)
- April 21 – Franciscus Plante, Dutch painter, chaplain (d. 1690)
- April 29 – Christoph Bach, German musician (d. 1661)
- May 9 – Mattias de' Medici, Italian noble (d. 1667)
- May 10 – François Chauveau, French painter (d. 1676)
- May 15 – George Seton, Lord Seton, Scottish noble (d. 1648)
- May 31 – John George II, Elector of Saxony (1656–1680) (d. 1680)
- June 1 – William Wirich, Count of Daun-Falkenstein, German nobleman (d. 1682)
- June 13 – Johann Ernst, Count of Hanau-Münzenberg (1641–1642) (d. 1642)
- June 16 – John Cleveland, English poet (d. 1658)
- July 15 – Gu Yanwu, Chinese philologist and geographer (d. 1682)
- July 16 – Alderano Cybo, Catholic cardinal (d. 1700)
- August 7 – William Frederick, Prince of Nassau-Dietz, Dutch stadtholder (d. 1664)
- August 15 – Gilles Ménage, French scholar (d. 1692)
- August 18 – Sir Thomas Peyton, 2nd Baronet, English politician (d. 1684)
- August 20 – Duchess Elisabeth Sophie of Mecklenburg, German poet composer and (by marriage) Duchess of Brunswick-Lüneburg (d. 1676)
- August 24 – Bartholomew Holzhauser, German priest, founder of a religious community, visionary, writer of prophecies (d. 1658)
- August 29 – John Jolliffe, English politician and businessman (d. 1680)
- September 8 – Henri Albert de La Grange d'Arquien, Catholic cardinal (d. 1707)
- September 15 – François de La Rochefoucauld, French writer (d. 1680)
- September 19 – Sir John Norwich, 1st Baronet, English Member of Parliament (d. 1661)
- September 25 – Claude Perrault, French architect (d. 1688)
- October 3 – Marion Delorme, French courtesan known for her relationships with the important men of her time (d. 1650)
- October 12 – Jacques d'Arthois, Flemish painter (d. 1686)
- October 13
  - Luisa de Guzmán, Duchess of Braganza, queen consort of Portugal (d. 1666)
  - Adriaan Heereboord, Dutch philosopher (d. 1661)
- October 19 – Charles of Sezze, Italian Franciscan friar and saint (d. 1670)
- October 28 – Edmund Bowyer, English politician (d. 1681)
- November 5 – Isaac de Benserade, French poet (d. 1691)
- November 12 – Sir Ralph Verney, 1st Baronet, of Middle Claydon, English Baronet (d. 1696)
- November 16 – Frederick, Prince of Anhalt-Harzgerode (1635–1670) (d. 1670)
- November 20 – Tyman Oosdorp, Dutch Golden Age brewer and magistrate of Haarlem (d. 1668)
- November 24 – John Knight, Member of the Parliament of England (d. 1683)
- November 25 – Philip VII, Count of Waldeck-Wildungen (1638–1645) (d. 1645)
- December 4 (bapt.) – Samuel Butler, English satirist (d. 1680)
- December 10 – Izaak van Oosten, Flemish painter (d. 1661)
- December 11 – Amar Singh Rathore, Rajput nobleman affiliated with the royal house of Marwar (d. 1644)
- December 23 – Carl Gustaf Wrangel, Field Marshal of Sweden (d. 1676)
- December 28 – Bullen Reymes, English courtier, diplomat and politician (d. 1672)
- Henry Vane, English politician (d. 1662)
- Khushal Khan Khattak, Afghan poet (d. 1690)
- Richard Crashaw, English poet (d. 1649)

1614

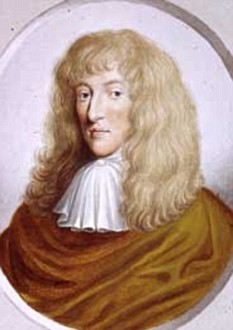
Christopher Merret

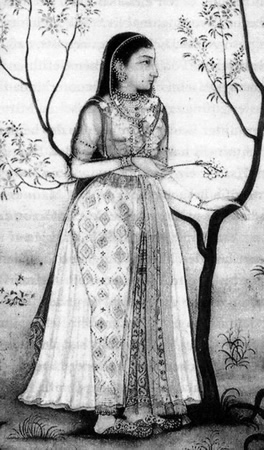
Jahanara Begum

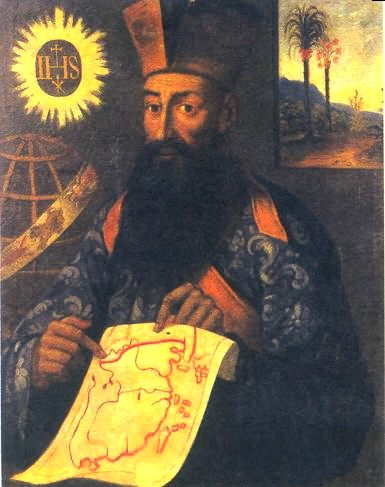
Martino Martini

- January 1
  - Henry Frederick, Hereditary Prince of the Palatinate (d. 1629)
  - Luis Guillermo de Moncada, 7th Duke of Montalto, Spanish Catholic cardinal (d. 1672)
- January 5 – Archduke Leopold Wilhelm of Austria, Governor of the Spanish Netherlands (d. 1662)
- January 10 – Kanō Yasunobu, Japanese painter of the Kanō school of painting, during the Edo period (d. 1685)
- January 20 – Samuel Gott, English politician (d. 1671)
- February 2 – Robert Ellison, English politician (d. 1678)
- February 8 – Thomas Wendy, English politician (d. 1673)
- February 14 – John Wilkins, English bishop, academic and natural philosopher (d. 1672)
- February 16 – Christopher Merret, English physician and scientist (d. 1695)
- March 3 – Sir Peter Leycester, 1st Baronet, British historian (d. 1678)
- March 8 – Hendrik van der Borcht II, German painter (d. 1676)
- March 15 – Franciscus Sylvius, Dutch physician and scientist (d. 1672)
- March 25
  - Thomas Chicheley, English politician who fell from favour, during the reign of James II (d. 1699)
  - Juan Carreño de Miranda, Spanish artist (d. 1685)
- April 1 – Martin Schoock, Dutch academic (d. 1669)
- April 2 – Jahanara Begum, Mughal princess (d. 1681)
- April 10 – William Thompson, English Member of Parliament (d. 1681)
- April 11 – Helena Fourment, Dutch model, second wife of Peter Paul Rubens (d. 1673)
- April 18 – Nicolas Robert, French painter (d. 1685)
- April 25
  - Hieronymus van Beverningh, Dutch diplomat and politician (d. 1690)
  - Marc'Antonio Pasqualini, Italian opera singer and composer (d. 1691)
- May 10 – Zacharias Wagenaer, secretary, painter, then merchant and administrator (Dutch East-India Company) (d. 1668)
- May 12 – Giovanni Bernardo Carboni, Italian painter (d. 1683)
- May 28 – Gustav Evertsson Horn, Finnish-Swedish politician, Field Marshal (d. 1666)
- June 15 – Emilie of Oldenburg-Delmenhorst, Regent of Schwarzburg-Rudolstadt (1646–1662) (d. 1670)
- June 24 – John Belasyse, 1st Baron Belasyse of England (d. 1689)
- July 10 – Arthur Annesley, 1st Earl of Anglesey, English royalist statesman (d. 1686)
- July 23 – Bonaventura Peeters the Elder, Flemish marine painter (d. 1652)
- August 3 – Juan de Arellano, Spanish artist (d. 1676)
- August 13 – Augustus, Duke of Saxe-Weissenfels, administrator of the archbishopric of Magdeburg (d. 1680)
- September 7 – Gustaf Otto Stenbock, Swedish soldier and politician (d. 1685)
- September 11 – Philipp Buchner, German composer (d. 1669)
- September 12 – Robert Packer, English politician (d. 1682)
- September 20 – Martino Martini, Italian missionary, cartographer and historian (d. 1661)
- September 25 – Giles Hungerford, English politician (d. 1685)
- September 27 – Daniel Hallé, French painter (d. 1675)
- September 28 – Juan Hidalgo de Polanco, Spanish composer (d. 1685)
- October 3 – Sigmund von Erlach, Swiss politician (d. 1699)
- October 6 – Francesco de' Medici, Tuscan prince (d. 1634)
- October 12 – Henry More, English philosopher (d. 1687)
- October 13 – Thomas Jones, English politician and judge (d. 1692)
- October 20 (bapt.) – Franciscus Mercurius van Helmont, Flemish alchemist (d. 1698)
- November 2 – Philip Dietrich, Count of Waldeck-Eisenberg (1640–1645) (d. 1645)
- November 4 – Alexander Charles Vasa, 5th son of King Sigismund III of Poland (d. 1634)
- November 11 – John Bulkeley, English politician (d. 1662)
- November 27 – Fernando de Meneses, 2nd Count of Ericeira, Portuguese noble (d. 1699)
- November 30 – William Howard, 1st Viscount Stafford of England (d. 1680)
- December 16 – Eberhard III, Duke of Württemberg (d. 1674)
- December 21 – Francis Anderson, English politician (d. 1679)
- December 27 – Béatrix de Cusance, Frenc-Comtois noble woman (d. 1663)
- December 31 – Mechtilde of the Blessed Sacrament, French nun (d. 1698)
- Franciscus Sylvius, German scientist (d. 1672)
- Song Wan, Qing dynasty poet and politician

1615

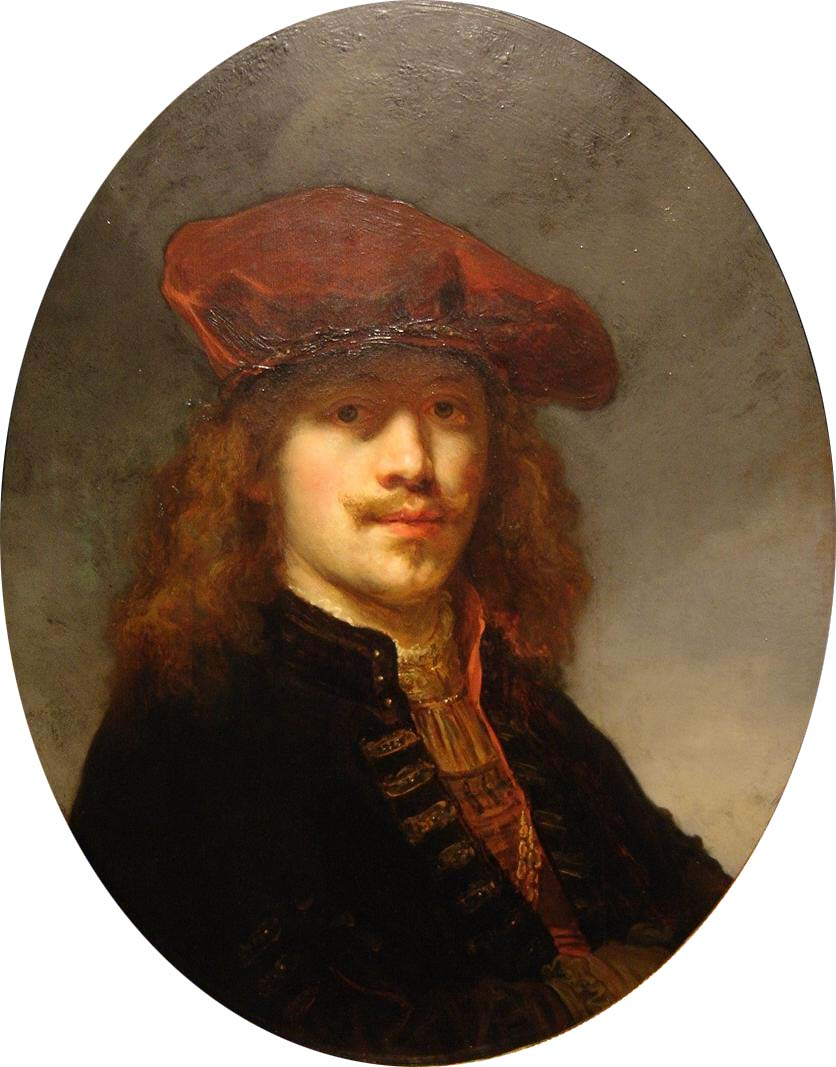
Govert Flinck

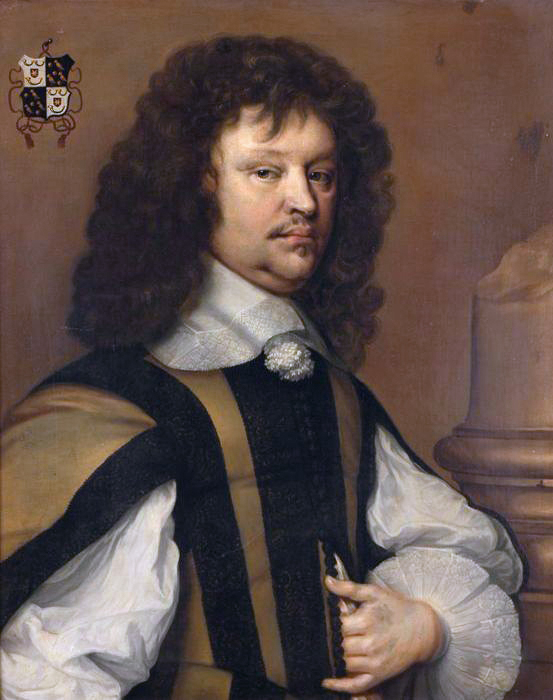
Pieter de Groot

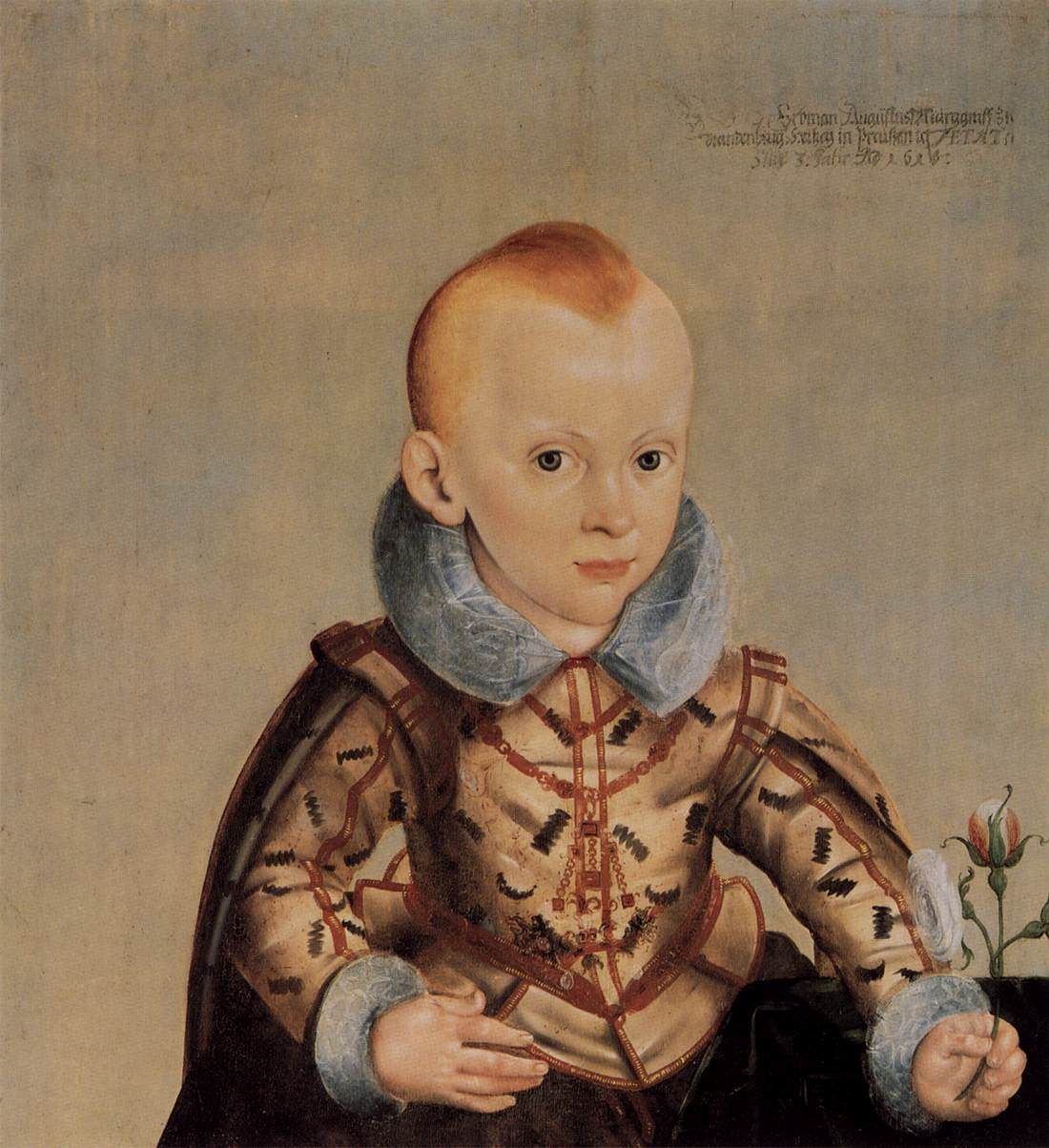
Erdmann August of Brandenburg-Bayreuth

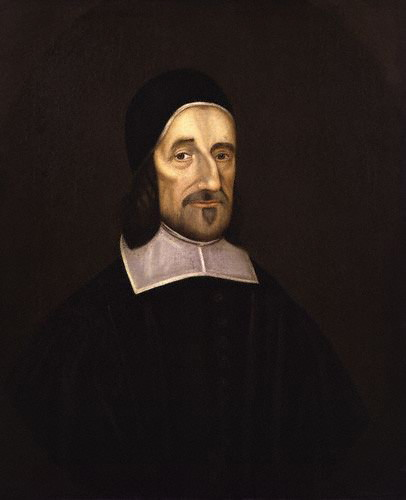
Richard Baxter

- January 6 – Richard Waldron, colonial settler, acting President of the Province of New Hampshire (d. 1689)
- January 10 – Sir John Robinson, 1st Baronet, of London, English politician (d. 1680)
- January 13 – Henrik Bjelke, Norwegian military officer (d. 1683)
- January 14 – John Biddle, English theologian (d. 1662)
- January 20 – Karmabai, Indian Jat known as Bhakt Shiromani Karmabai (d. 1634)
- January 25 – Govert Flinck, Dutch painter of the Dutch Golden Age (d. 1660)
- January 27 – Nicolas Fouquet, French Superintendent of Finances (d. 1680)
- January 30 – Thomas Rolfe, only child of Pocahontas and her English husband (d. 1675)
- February 18 – Maria Caterina Farnese, Duchess of Modena and Reggio (d. 1646)
- February 27 – Isaac Thornton, English politician (d. 1669)
- March 10 – Hans Ulrik Gyldenløve, illegitimate son of King Christian IV of Denmark and his mistress (d. 1645)
- March 11 – Johann Weikhard of Auersperg, Austrian prime minister (d. 1677)
- March 13 – Pope Innocent XII (d. 1700)
- March 17 – Gregorio Carafa, Grandmaster of the Order of Saint John (d. 1690)
- March 20 – Dara Shikoh, Indian prince (d. 1659)
- March 22 – Katherine Jones, Viscountess Ranelagh, English female scientist (d. 1691)
- March 28 – Pieter de Groot, Dutch diplomat (d. 1678)
- March 28 – Cosimo Ruggeri, Italian astrologer
- April 7 – Charles Cotterell, English courtier (d. 1701)
- April 9 – John Wright, British politician (d. 1683)
- April 16 – Edward Rawson, American settler (d. 1693)
- April 17 – Jacques Goulet, early pioneer in New France (now Québec) (d. 1688)
- April 24 – Klas Hansson Bjelkenstjerna, Swedish naval officer and civil servant (d. 1662)
- May 30 – Richard Neville, English soldier and MP (d. 1676)
- June 3 – Giles Strangways, English politician (d. 1675)
- June 15 – Samuel Sandys, English politician (d. 1685)
- June 20 (or July 31) – Salvator Rosa, Italian painter (d. 1673)
- July 1 – Samuel Hales, Connecticut settler and politician (d. 1693)
- July 9 – Sir Thomas Sclater, 1st Baronet, English politician (d. 1684)
- July 22 – Marguerite of Lorraine, princess of Lorraine, duchess of Orléans (d. 1672)
- July 28 – Charles de Noyelle, French Jesuit Superior General (d. 1686)
- August 13 – John Sherburne, American colonial (d. 1693)
- August 15 – Marie de Lorraine, Duchess of Guise (d. 1688)
- August 18 – John Sadler, British town clerk (d. 1674)
- September 3 – Mary Bradbury, accused Salem, Massachusetts witch (d. 1700)
- September 7 – John Birch, English politician (d. 1691)
- September 12
  - Landgravine Sophie of Hesse-Kassel, Countess of Schaumburg-Lippe (d. 1670)
  - William Turner, British politician (d. 1693)
- September 17 – Nicholas Pedley, English politician (d. 1685)
- September 20 – Giambattista Spinola, Italo-Spanish Roman Catholic cardinal (d. 1704)
- September 26 – Heinrich Bach, German organist and composer (d. 1692)
- October 1 – Hugh Bethell, English Member of Parliament and High Sheriff (d. 1679)
- October 8 – Erdmann August of Brandenburg-Bayreuth, Hereditary Margrave (d. 1651)
- October 23 – Ove Juul, Governor-General of Norway (d. 1686)
- October 27 – Christian I, Duke of Saxe-Merseburg, member of the House of Wettin (d. 1691)
- November 5 – Ibrahim, Ottoman Sultan (d. 1648)
- November 12 – Richard Baxter, English Puritan church leader (d. 1691)
- November 19 – Richard Norton of Southwick Park, English politician (d. 1691)
- November 20 – Francis Dane, American colonial priest (d. 1697)
- November 24 – Philip William, Elector Palatine (d. 1690)
- December 6 – Frederick Schomberg, 1st Duke of Schomberg (d. 1690)
- December 7 – Nicodemus Tessin the Elder, Swedish architect (d. 1681)
- December 9 – Anne Carr, Countess of Bedford, English noble (d. 1684)
- December 19 – Frederick, Duke of Württemberg-Neuenstadt, German duke (d. 1682)
- December 21 – Benedict Arnold, Rhode Island colonial governor (d. 1678)
- December 29 – Charles Scarborough, English physician, mathematician (d. 1694)
- Date unknown:
  - Osoet Pegua, Thai businesswoman (d. 1658)
  - Gironima Spana, Italian poisoner (d. 1659)
  - John Lacy, English actor and playwright (d. 1681)

1616

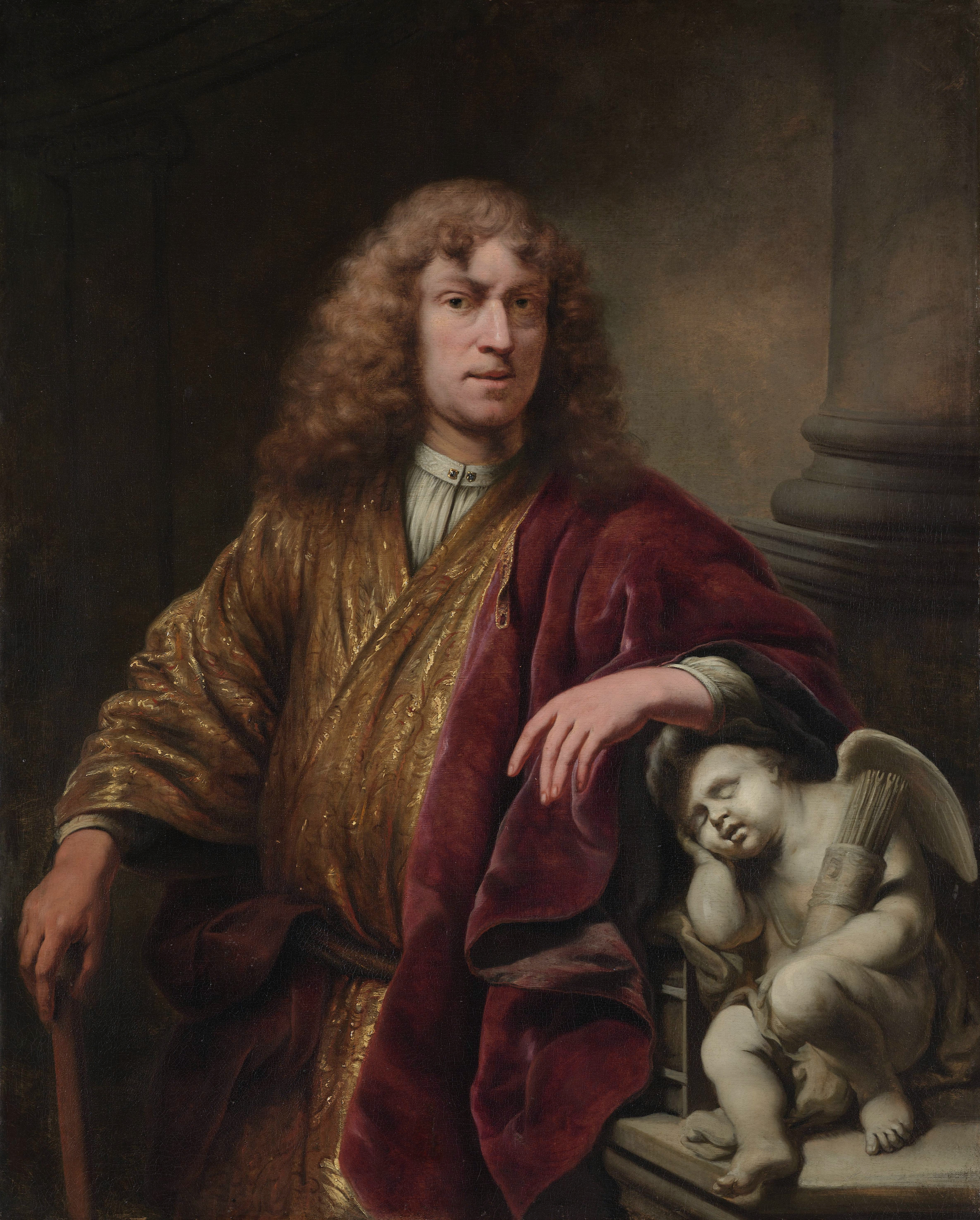
Ferdinand Bol

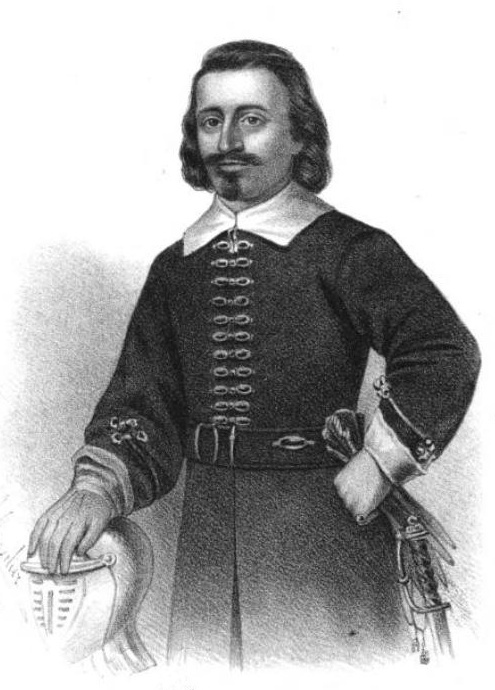
John Leverett

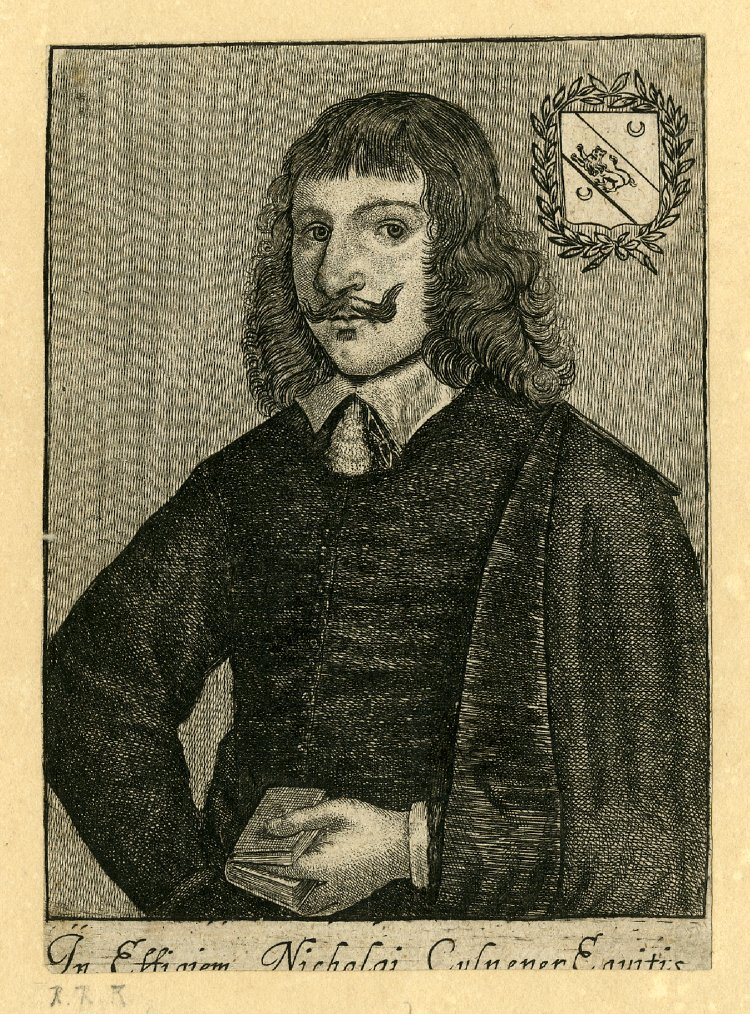
Nicholas Culpeper

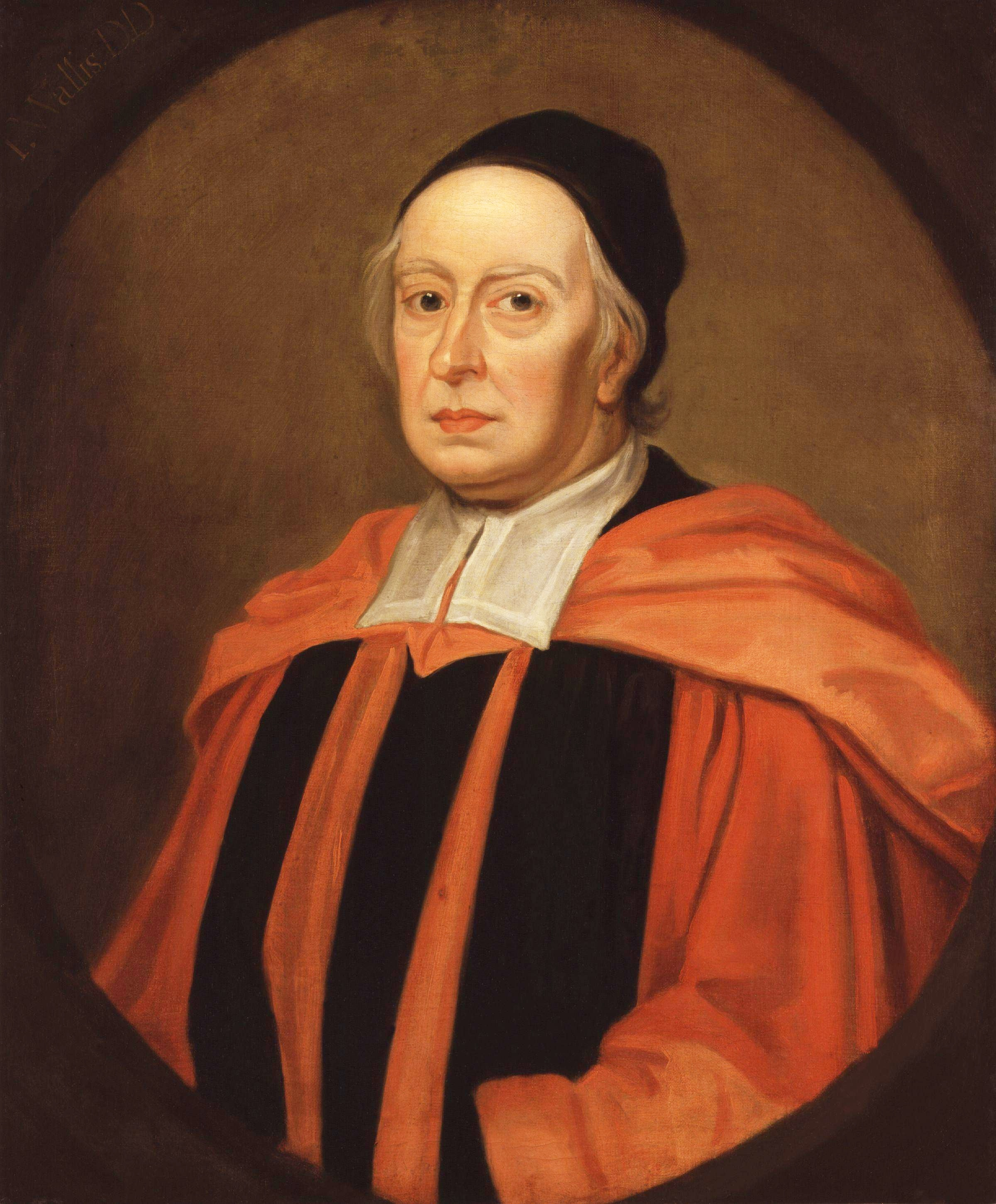
John Wallis

- January 1 – Nabeshima Naozumi, Japanese daimyō (d. 1669)
- January 5 – Alexander von Bournonville, Flemish noble and general (d. 1690)
- January 13 – Antoinette Bourignon, French-Flemish mystic and adventurer (d. 1680)
- January 16 – François de Vendôme, Duke of Beaufort, French soldier (d. 1669)
- January 20 – Jerzy Sebastian Lubomirski, Polish noble (szlachcic) (d. 1667)
- January 27 or January 28 – Christen Aagaard, Danish poet (d. 1664)
- February 1 – Sophie Elisabeth of Brandenburg, Duchess consort of Saxe-Altenburg (d. 1650)
- February 2 – Sébastien Bourdon, French painter and engraver (d. 1671)
- February 14 – Marc Restout, French painter (d. 1684)
- February 25 – Isaack Luttichuys, Dutch Golden Age painter (d. 1673)
- February 27 – István Esterházy, member of the wealthy Hungarian Esterházy family (d. 1641)
- February 28
  - Kaspar Förster, German singer and composer (d. 1673)
  - Frederick of Hesse-Darmstadt, German Catholic cardinal (d. 1682)
- March 1 – Maurizio Cazzati, Italian composer (d. 1678)
- March 9 – Robert Giguère, early pioneer in New France (d. 1709)
- March 13 – Joseph Beaumont, British academic and poet (d. 1699)
- March 16 – Thomas Jervoise, English politician (d. 1693)
- March 29 – Johann Erasmus Kindermann, German composer and organist (d. 1655)
- April 1 – Christian Günther II, Count of Schwarzburg-Sondershausen-Arnstadt (1642–1666) (d. 1666)
- April 2 – Herbert Morley, English politician (d. 1667)
- April 5 – Frederick, Count Palatine of Zweibrücken (d. 1661)
- April 7 – Thomas Hopkins, early Providence, Rhode Island settler (d. 1684)
- April 19 – Louis IV of Legnica, Duke of Oława and Brzeg (1633–1654) (d. 1663)
- April 24 – Gustav, Count of Vasaborg, illegitimate son of King Gustavus Adolphus and his mistress Margareta Slots (d. 1653)
- April 27 – Jeremias Felbinger, German Socinian writer (d. 1690)
- May 1 – Frederick III, Margrave of Brandenburg-Ansbach (1625–1634) (d. 1634)
- May 16 – Archibald Primrose, Lord Carrington, Scottish judge (d. 1679)
- May 19 – Johann Jakob Froberger, German composer and keyboardist (d. 1667)
- May 23 – Sir Edward Bagot, 2nd Baronet, English politician (d. 1673)
- May 24 – John Maitland, 1st Duke of Lauderdale (d. 1682)
- May 25 – Carlo Dolci, Italian painter (d. 1686)
- May 27 – Christina Magdalena of the Palatinate-Zweibrücken, Swedish Princess by birth; margravine of Baden-Durlach by marriage (d. 1662)
- June – John Thurloe, English spymaster for Oliver Cromwell (d. 1668)
- June 3 – George Courthope, English politician (d. 1685)
- June 23 – Shah Shuja, second son of Shah Jahan and Mumtaz Mahal (d. 1661)
- June 24
  - Ferdinand Bol, Dutch Dutch painter, etcher and draftsman (d. 1680)
  - Philipp, Prince of Hohenzollern-Hechingen (1661–1671) (d. 1671)
- June 25 – James Livingstone, 1st Viscount Kilsyth of Scotland (d. 1661)
- June 28 – Lucas Franchoys the Younger, Flemish painter (d. 1681)
- July 7 (bapt.) – John Leverett, Governor of Massachusetts Bay Colony (d. 1679)
- July 10 – Antonio del Castillo y Saavedra, Spanish artist (d. 1668)
- July 21 – Anna de' Medici, Archduchess of Austria (d. 1676)
- August – William Russell, 1st Duke of Bedford, British peer and soldier (d. 1700)
- August 6 – John Higginson, English minister (d. 1708)
- August 12 – Johann Paul Freiherr von Hocher, Austrian chancellor (d. 1683)
- August 18 – John Hervey, English courtier and politician (d. 1680)
- August 30 – Giovan Battista Nani, Italian historian and diplomat (d. 1678)
- September 9 – Nicolás de Villacis, Spanish painter (d. 1694)
- September 25 – Alexander Morus, Franco-Scottish Calvinist preacher (d. 1670)
- October 4 – Philippe Balthazar de Gand, French noble (d. 1680)
- October 11 – Andreas Gryphius, German lyric poet and dramatist (d. 1664)
- October 15 – Hoshina Masakage, Japanese daimyō of the Edo period (d. 1700)
- October 18 – Nicholas Culpeper, English botanist (d. 1654)
- October 20 – Thomas Bartholin, Danish physician, mathematician, and theologian (d. 1680)
- October 21 – Camillo Astalli, Italian cardinal (d. 1663)
- November 13 – Nicholas Dennys, English politician (d. 1692)
- November 23 – John Wallis, English mathematician (d. 1703)
- December 12 – Martin Lluelyn, Welsh poet (d. 1682)
- December 13 – Edward Chamberlayne, English writer (d. 1703)
- December 14 – William Hamilton, 2nd Duke of Hamilton, Scottish nobleman (d. 1651)
- December 17 – Roger L'Estrange, English pamphleteer and author (d. 1704)
- December 25 – Christian Hoffmann von Hoffmannswaldau, German poet (d. 1679)
- Charles Albanel, French missionary (d. 1696)
- Henry Bard, 1st Viscount Bellomont, English Royalist (d. 1656)
- Jan Kazimierz Chodkiewicz, Polish nobleman (szlachcic) (d. 1660)
- Thomas Harrison, English Puritan soldier and Fifth Monarchist (d. 1660)
- William Holder, English music theorist (d. 1698)
- Kamalakara, Indian astronomer/mathematician (d. 1700)
- Johann Klaj, German poet (d. 1656)
- Kuzma Minin, merchant from Nizhny Novgorod
- Sokuhi Nyoitsu, Buddhist monk (d. 1671)
- John Owen, English Nonconformist theologian (d. 1683)
- Edward Sexby, English Puritan soldier/Leveller (d. 1658)
- Obadiah Walker, Master of University College, Oxford (d. 1699)
- Caesar van Everdingen, Dutch older brother of Allart van Everdingen (d. 1678)
- Matthias Weckmann, German musician/composer (d. 1674)
- Trijntje Keever, presumed to have been the tallest woman ever (d. 1633)
- A Greenland shark, still alive

1617

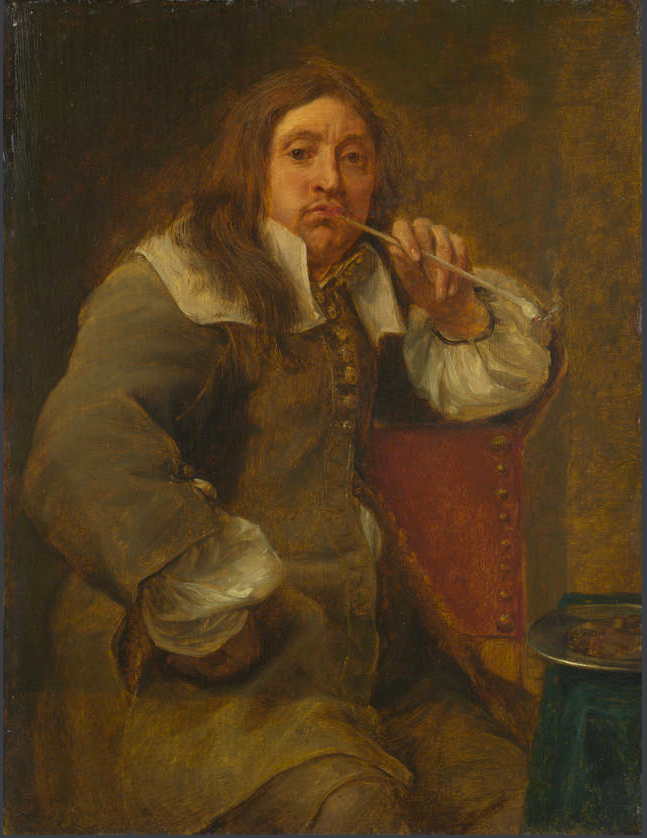
Lucas Faydherbe

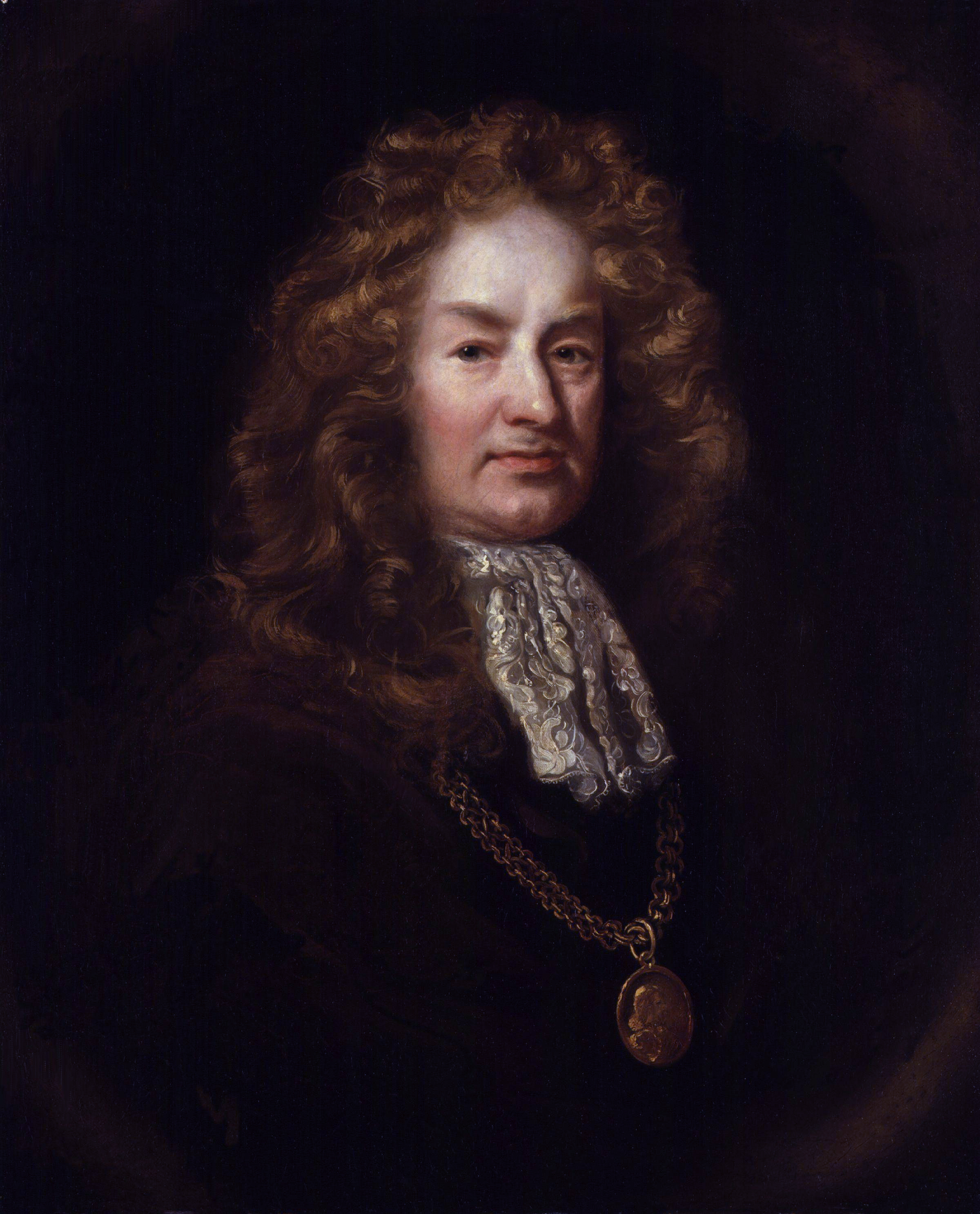
Elias Ashmole

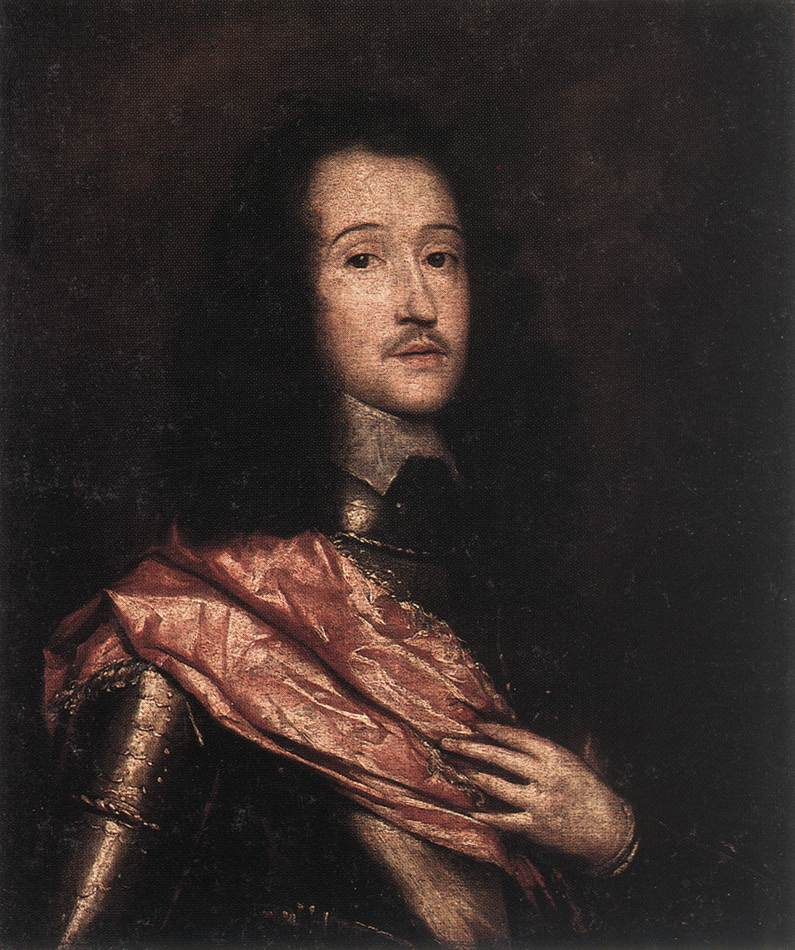
Richard Lovelace

- January 6 – Christoffer Gabel, Danish statesman (d. 1673)
- January 19 – Lucas Faydherbe, Belgian sculptor and architect (d. 1697)
- January 22 – Lodewijck Neefs, Flemish painter (d. 1649)
- January 23 – Ralph Josselin, English clergyman (d. 1683)
- January 30
  - Isaac de Porthau, Gascon black musketeer of the Maison du Roi (d. 1712)
  - William Sancroft, 79th Archbishop of Canterbury (d. 1693)
- February 5 – Jan Thomas van Ieperen, Flemish engraver, painter (d. 1673)
- February 22 – Robert Culliford, English politician (d. 1698)
- March 8 – Tito Livio Burattini, Italian inventor, Egyptologist, instrument-maker (d. 1681)
- March 17
  - David Ancillon, French Huguenot pastor and author (d. 1692)
  - Johann Georg Macasius, German physician (d. 1653)
- April 4 – Sir George Wharton, 1st Baronet, English baronet (d. 1681)
- April 20 – Sir John Goodricke, 1st Baronet, English landowner and politician (d. 1670)
- May 3 – Roger Pepys, English lawyer and politician (d. 1688)
- May 9 – Frederick, Landgrave of Hesse-Eschwege (d. 1655)
- May 23 – Elias Ashmole, English antiquarian (d. 1692)
- June 2 – Maeda Toshitsugu, Japanese daimyō of the early Edo period (d. 1674)
- June 13 – Sir Vincent Corbet, 1st Baronet, English politician (d. 1656)
- June 18 – George Evelyn, English politician (d. 1699)
- June 20 – Franciscus Bonae Spei, French Catholic scholastic theologian, philosopher (d. 1677)
- July 31 – Nicolás Antonio, Spanish bibliographer born in Seville (d. 1684)
- August 10 – Richard Ingoldsby, English politician (d. 1685)
- August 13 – Johannes Andreas Quenstedt, German theologian (d. 1688)
- August 25 – Frances Hyde, Countess of Clarendon, English noble (d. 1667)
- September 3 – Roshanara Begum, Mughal princess (d. 1671)
- September 13 – Margravine Louise Charlotte of Brandenburg, Duchess of Courland by marriage (1645–1676) (d. 1676)
- September 25 – Sir Francis Drake, 2nd Baronet, English Member of Parliament (d. 1662)
- September 29 – Lothar Friedrich von Metternich-Burscheid, Prince-Bishop of Speyer (1652–1675) (d. 1675)
- October 5 – Dorothy Spencer, Countess of Sunderland, English countess (d. 1684)
- October 10 – William Cavendish, 3rd Earl of Devonshire, English nobleman (d. 1684)
- October 12 – Sir Francis Gerard, 2nd Baronet, English Member of Parliament (d. 1680)
- October 17 – Dionisio Lazzari, Italian sculptor and architect (d. 1689)
- October 28
  - Cornelius Hazart, Dutch Jesuit priest, polemical author (d. 1690)
  - Antoine Garaby de La Luzerne, French poet (d. 1679)
- November 4 – Johannes Hoornbeek, Dutch theologian (d. 1666)
- November 6 – Leopoldo de' Medici, Italian Catholic cardinal (d. 1675)
- November 16 – Frederick VI, Margrave of Baden-Durlach (1659–1677) (d. 1677)
- November 19 – Eustache Le Sueur, French painter (d. 1655)
- December – Gerard ter Borch, Dutch painter (d. 1681)
- December 4 – Federico Visconti, Cardinal Archbishop of Milan (d. 1693)
- December 9 – Richard Lovelace, English poet (d. 1657)
- December 22 – Charles I Louis, Elector Palatine (d. 1680)
- December 23 – Magdalene Sibylle of Saxony, Crown Princess of Denmark (d. 1668)
- December 25 – Jean de Coligny-Saligny, French noble and army commander (d. 1686)
- Paolo Casati, Italian Jesuit mathematician (d. 1707)
- Lozang Gyatso, 5th Dalai Lama (d. 1682)

1618

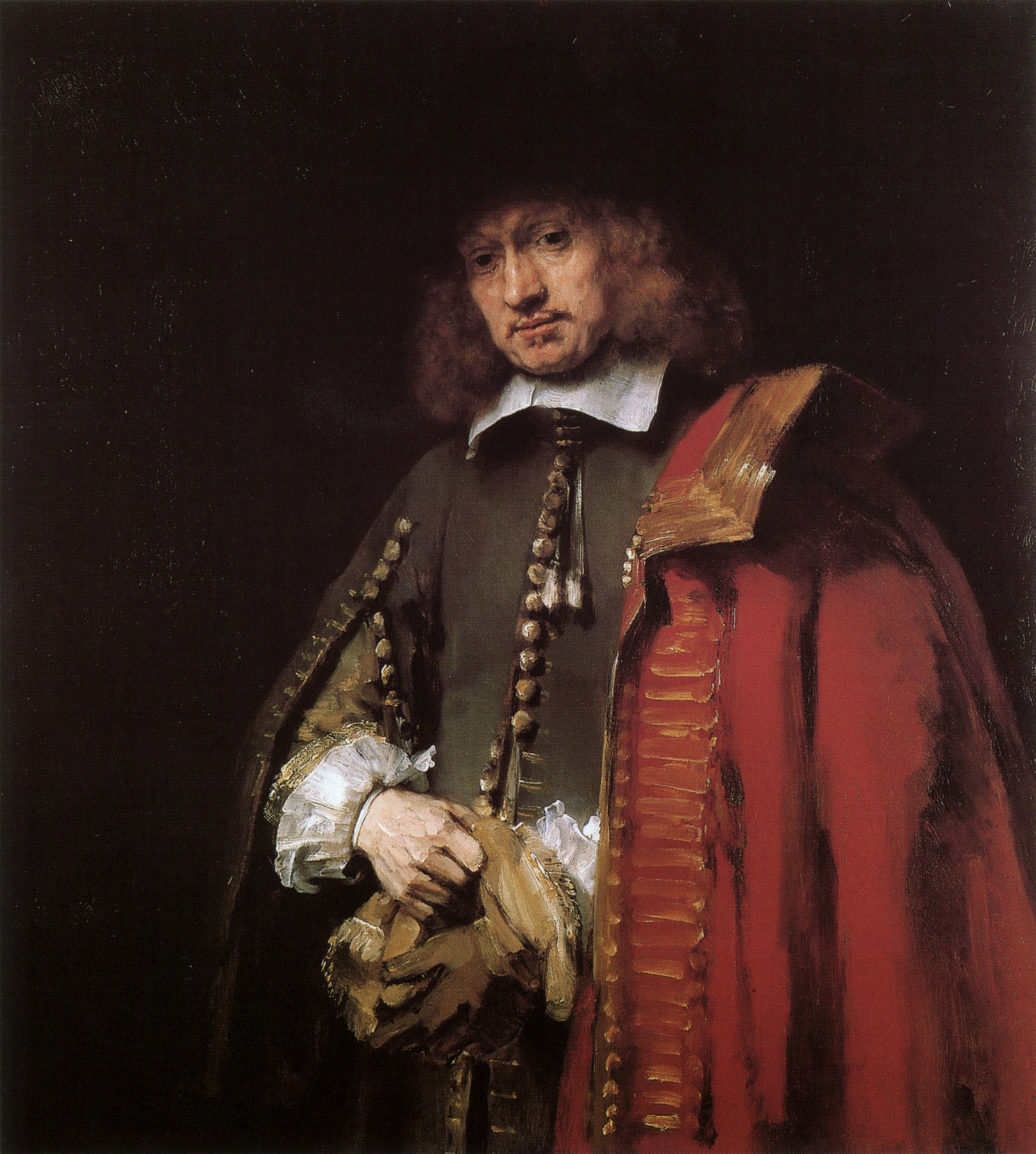
Jan Six

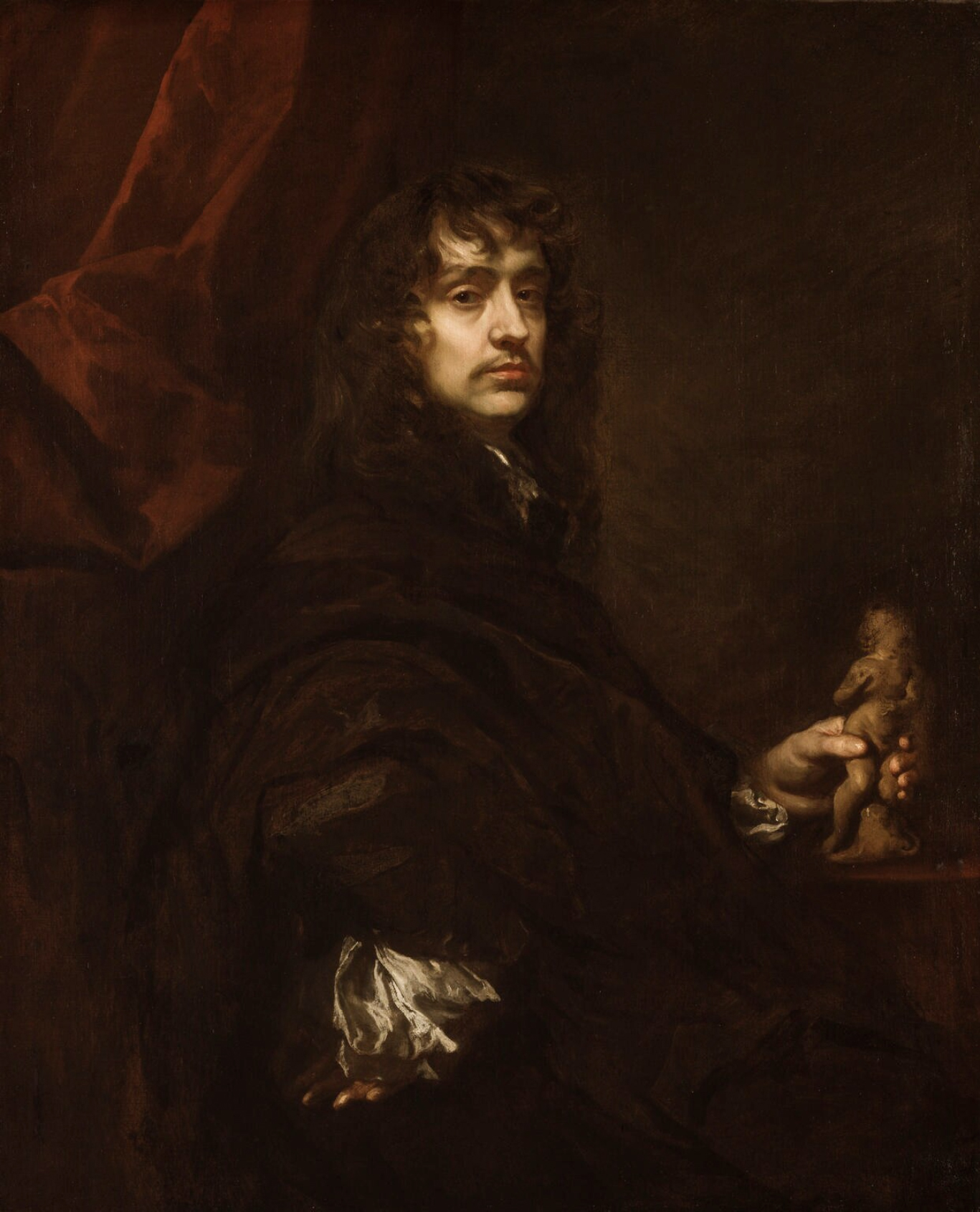
Sir Peter Lely

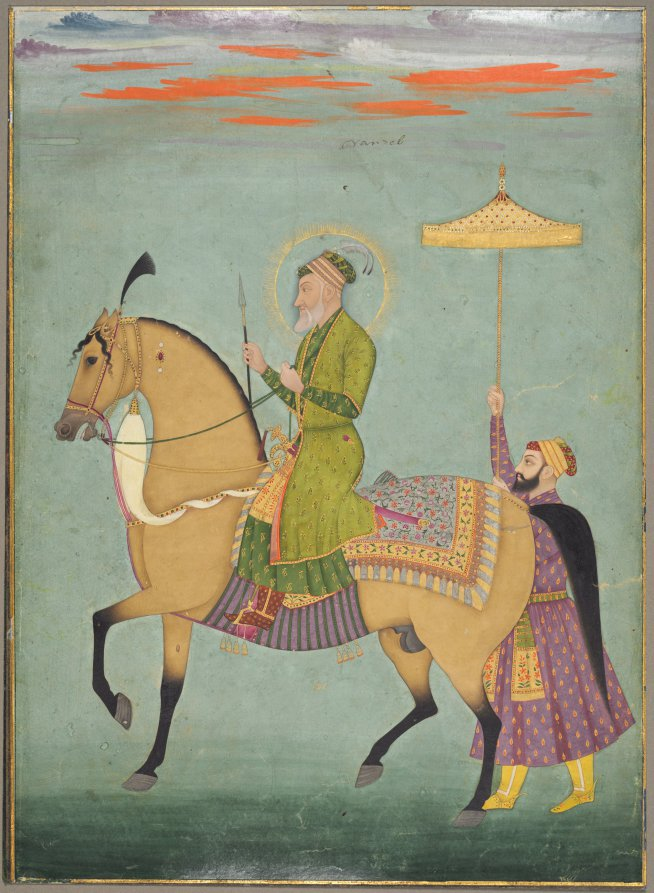
Aurangzeb

- January 1 (bapt.) – Bartolomé Esteban Murillo, Spanish painter (d. 1682)
- January 2 – Jean Hamon, French doctor and writer (d. 1687)
- January 3 – Jean Crasset, French Jesuit theologian (d. 1692)
- January 8 – Madeleine Béjart, French actress and theatre director (d. 1672)
- January 14 – Jan Six, important cultural figure in the Dutch Golden Age (d. 1700)
- January 25 – Nicolaes Visscher I, Dutch engraver, cartographer and publisher (d. 1679)
- January 28 – James Ley, 3rd Earl of Marlborough, English nobleman, sailor, and mathematician (d. 1665)
- January 29 – Jean Paul Médaille, French Jesuit missionary (d. 1689)
- February 12 – Olaus Verelius, scholar of Old Norse and Scandinavian studies (d. 1682)
- February 17 – Matthias Abele, Austrian jurist, mine official (d. 1677)
- February 19 – Johannes Phocylides Holwarda, Dutch astronomer (d. 1651)
- March 4 – George Louis, Prince of Nassau-Dillenburg, German noble (d. 1656)
- March 14 – Nadira Banu Begum, Mughal princess (d. 1659)
- March 19 – Thomas Hinckley, last colonial governor of Plymouth Colony (d. 1706)
- April 2 – Francesco Maria Grimaldi, Italian mathematician and physicist (d. 1663)
- April 4 – Ferrante III Gonzaga, Duke of Guastalla, Italian noble (d. 1678)
- April 9 – Christian, Duke of Brieg, Duke of Legnica (1663–1672) and Brieg (1664–1672) (d. 1672)
- April 13 – Roger de Rabutin, Comte de Bussy, French writer (d. 1693)
- April 14 – Thomas Moore, English politician (d. 1695)
- April 29 – Vittoria Farnese d'Este, Duchess of Modena and Reggio (d. 1649)
- May 22 – Henrik Horn, Swedish military leader and noble (d. 1693)
- June 1 – Johann Franck, German poet and hymnist (d. 1677)
- June 15
  - François Blondel, French architect (d. 1686)
  - Ippolito Lante Montefeltro della Rovere, Italian nobleman and Duke of Bomarzo (d. 1688)
- June 24 – Philip Packer, British barrister and architect (d. 1686)
- June 28 – Jean Le Pautre, French designer and engraver (d. 1682)
- July 6 – Alexander Lindsay, 1st Earl of Balcarres, Scottish politician and noble (d. 1659)
- July 17
  - Willem Ogier, Flemish playwright (d. 1689)
  - George Stewart, 9th Seigneur d'Aubigny, Scottish nobleman and military commander (d. 1642)
- July 21 – Hayashi Gahō, Japanese philosopher (d. 1688)
- July 22 – Johan Nieuhof, Dutch traveler who wrote about his journeys to Brazil (d. 1672)
- September 6 – Walter Hoyt, Connecticut settler (d. 1698)
- September 9 – Joan Cererols, Catalan musician and Benedictine monk (d. 1680)
- September 11 – Francesco Grue, Italian artist (d. 1673)
- September 14 – Peter Lely, Dutch painter (d. 1680)
- September 27 – Jacob Alting, Dutch linguist (d. 1679)
- September 29 – Michiel Sweerts, Flemish painter (d. 1664)
- October 8 – Claude Lamoral, 3rd Prince of Ligne, Spanish general and prince (d. 1679)
- October 7 – Rosina Schnorr, German businessperson (d. 1679)
- October 31 – Mariana de Jesús de Paredes, Catholic saint, the first person to be canonized from Ecuador (d. 1645)
- November – Simon Arnauld, Marquis de Pomponne, French diplomat and minister of Louis XIV (d. 1699)
- November 1 – Sir John Wittewrong, 1st Baronet, English parliamentarian (d. 1693)
- November 3 – Aurangzeb, Mughal emperor of India (d. 1707)
- November 8 – Louise de La Fayette, French courtier, friend of King Louis XIII (d. 1665)
- November 12 – Gottfried Welsch, German physician (d. 1690)
- November 16 – Johann Ludwig Schönleben, Carniolan priest (d. 1681)
- November 26 – Johan Frederik von Marschalck, German-born landowner, Chancellor of Norway (d. 1679)
- December 2
  - Edward Bayntun, English politician (d. 1679)
  - Nicholas Delves, English politician (d. 1690)
- December 3 – Sir William Ayloffe, 3rd Baronet, officer in the Royalist army during the English Civil War (d. 1662)
- December 18 – Karl Kaspar von der Leyen, German Catholic archbishop (d. 1676)
- December 26 – Elisabeth of the Palatinate, German princess, philosopher, and Calvinist (d. 1680)
- December 28 – Catharina Hooft, noblewoman of the Dutch Golden Age (d. 1691)
- Athittayawong, Ayutthayan monarch (d. 1629)
- Henry Bennet, 1st Earl of Arlington, English politician (member of the Cabal) d. 1685)

1619

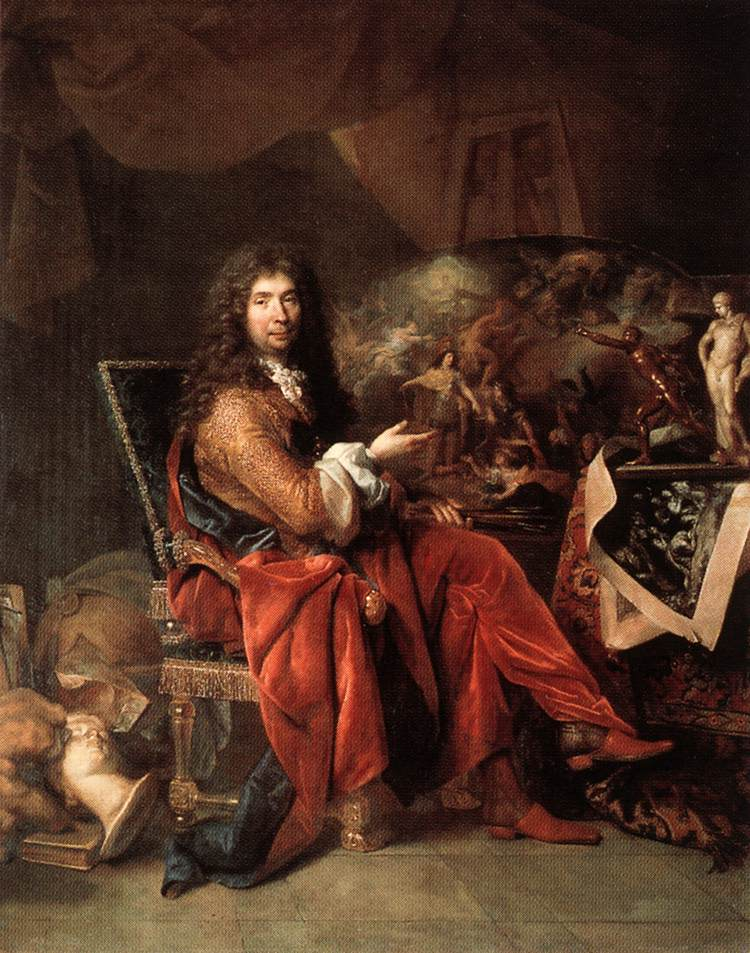
Charles Le Brun

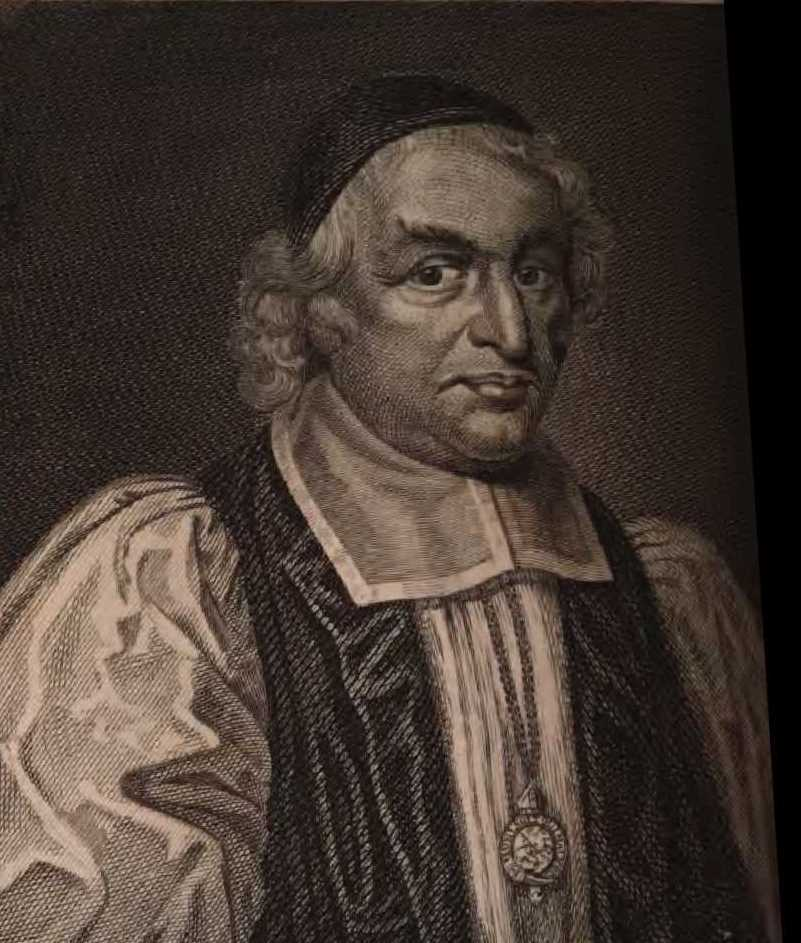
Peter Mews

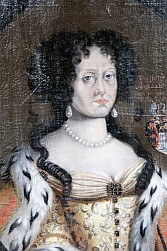
Anna Sophia I, Abbess of Quedlinburg

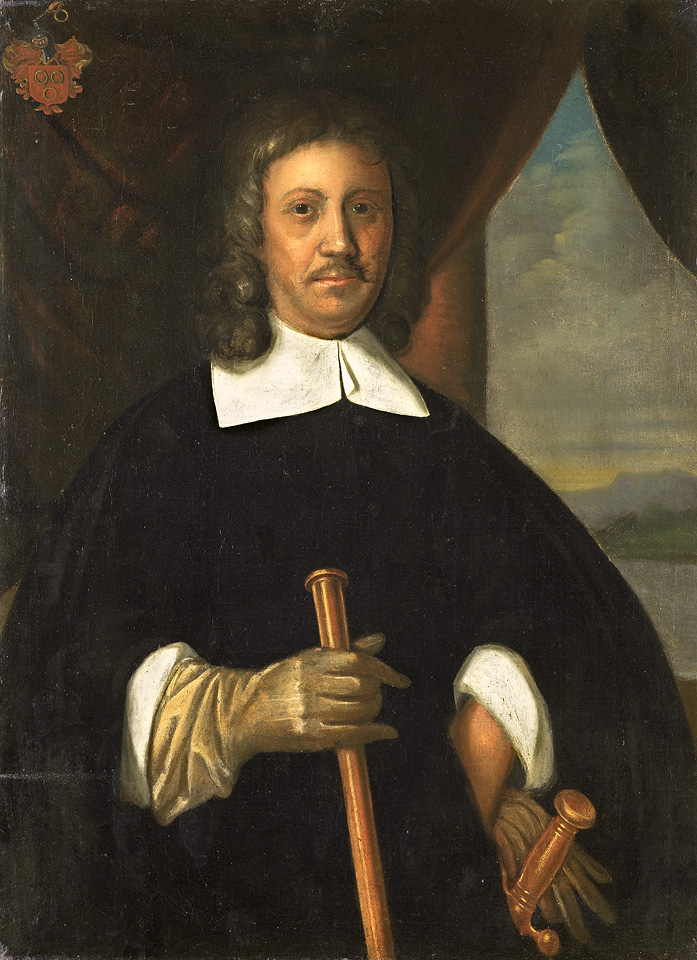
Jan van Riebeeck

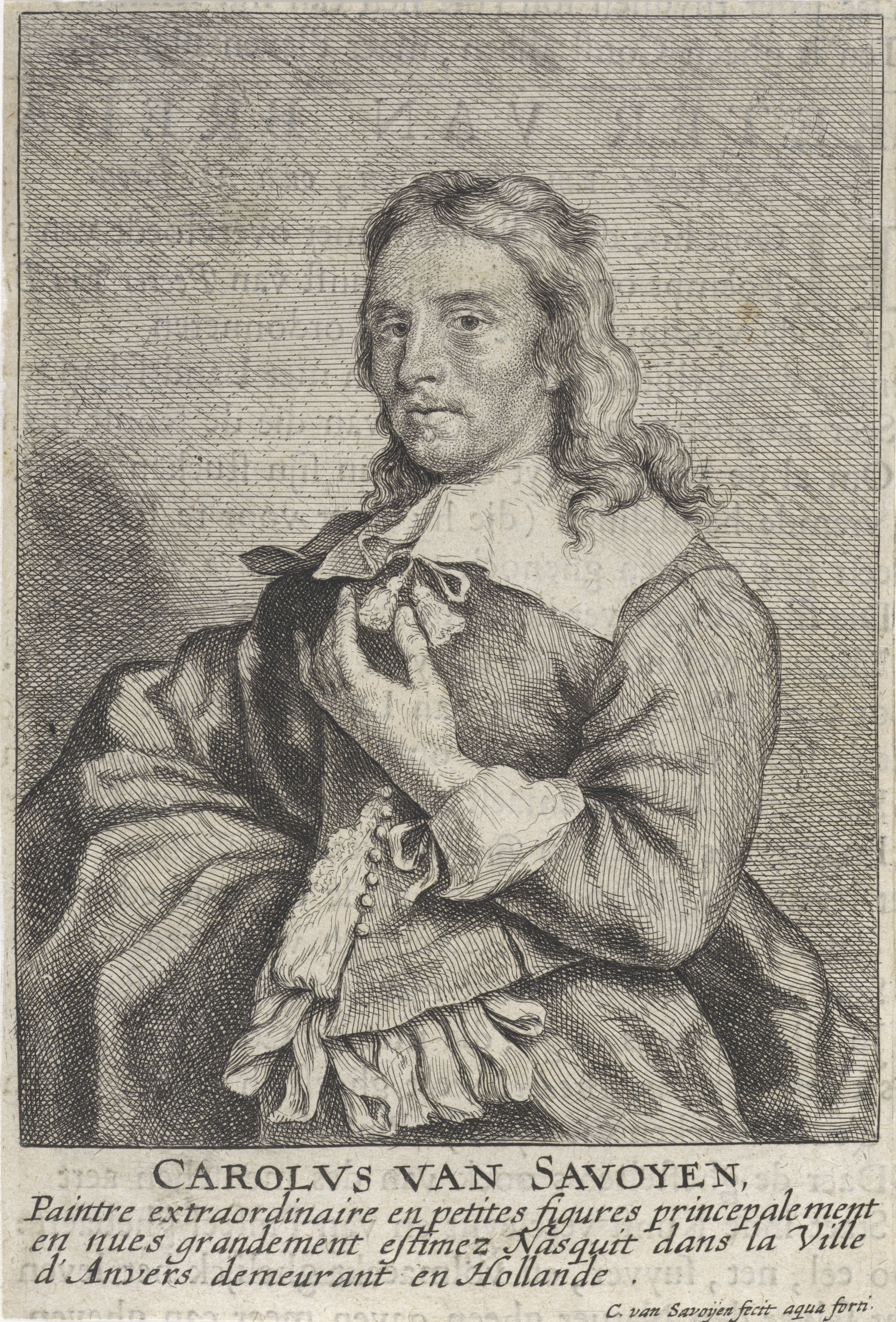
Carel van Savoyen

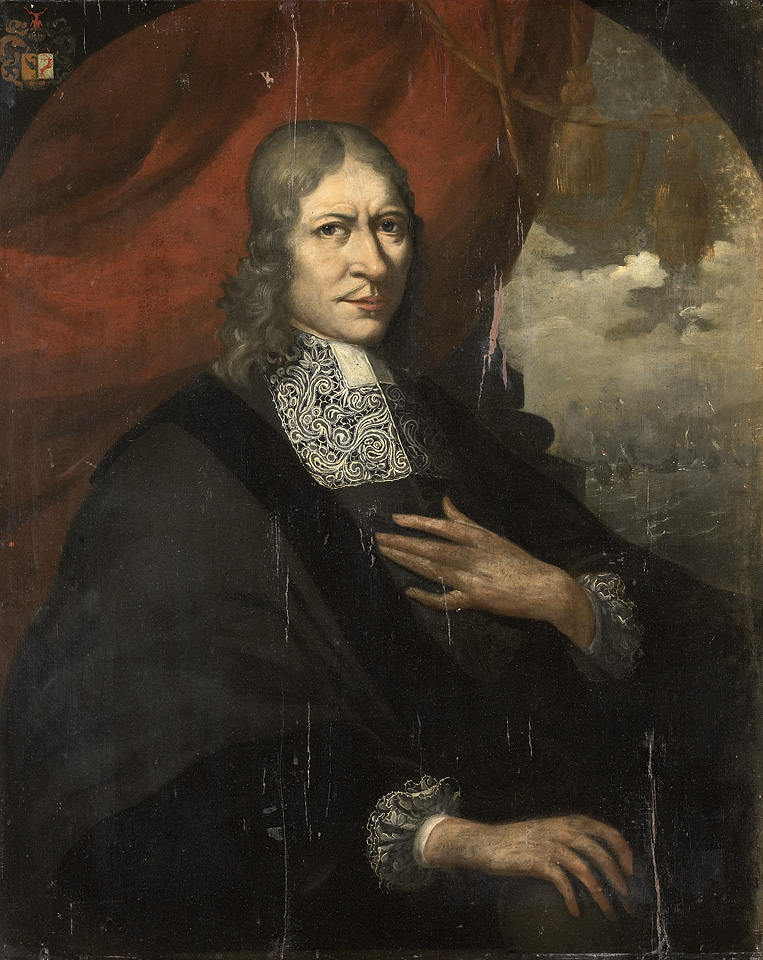
Rijcklof van Goens

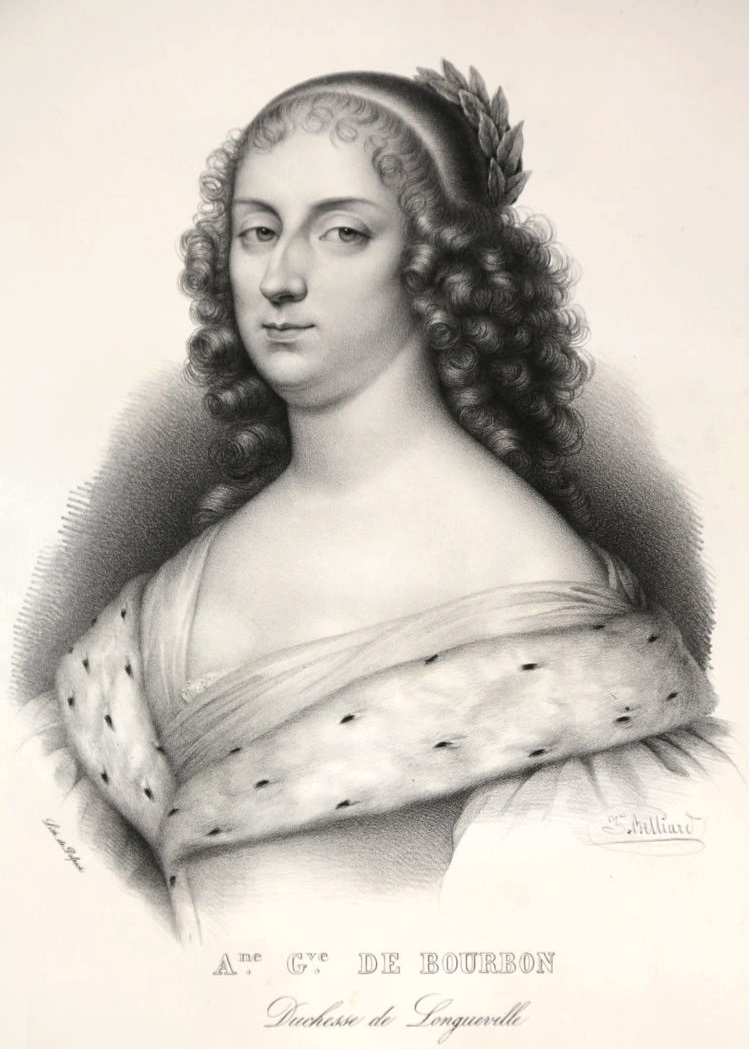
Anne Geneviève de Bourbon

- January 10 – Philip Sidney, 3rd Earl of Leicester, English politician (d. 1698)
- January 14
  - Thomas Archer, English politician (d. 1685)
  - Alexander von Spaen, German general (d. 1692)
- January 17 – Johanna Elisabeth of Nassau-Hadamar, by marriage Princess of Anhalt-Harzgerode (d. 1647)
- January 21
  - Anders Bording, Danish writer (d. 1677)
  - John Rashleigh, English politician (d. 1693)
- January 24 – Yamazaki Ansai, Japanese philosopher (d. 1682)
- January 30 – Michelangelo Ricci, Roman Catholic cardinal, mathematician (d. 1682)
- February 1 – Robert Phelips, English politician (d. 1707)
- February 2 – Walter Charleton, English natural philosopher (d. 1707)
- February 9 – Queen Inseon, Korean royal consort (d. 1674)
- February 15 – Tsugaru Nobuyoshi, Japanese daimyō (d. 1655)
- February 24
  - Robert Aske, merchant in the City of London (d. 1689)
  - Charles Le Brun, French painter and art theorist (d. 1690)
- February 26 – Francesco Morosini, Doge of Venice from 1688 to 1694 (d. 1694)
- February 28 – Giuseppe Felice Tosi, Italian composer (d. 1693)
- March 2 – Marcantonio Giustinian, 107th Doge of Venice (d. 1688)
- March 5 – Joseph Ames, English naval commander (d. 1695)
- March 6 – Cyrano de Bergerac, French soldier and poet (d. 1655)
- March 13 – Tobias Lohner, Austrian Jesuit theologian (d. 1697)
- March 15 – Jean Le Vacher, French Lazarist missionary and French consul (d. 1683)
- March 20 – Georg Albrecht, Margrave of Brandenburg-Bayreuth-Kulmbach (d. 1666)
- March 25 – Peter Mews, English Royalist theologian and bishop (d. 1706)
- March 28 – Maurice, Duke of Saxe-Zeitz (1657–1681) (d. 1681)
- April 2
  - Onofrio Gabrieli, Italian painter (d. 1706)
  - Anna Sophia I, Abbess of Quedlinburg, Dutch abbess (d. 1680)
- April 11 – Abraham van der Hulst, Dutch admiral (d. 1666)
- April 21 – Jan van Riebeeck, Dutch founder of Cape Town (d. 1677)
- April 30 – Johannes Spilberg, Dutch painter (d. 1690)
- May
  - James Dalrymple, 1st Viscount of Stair, Scottish lawyer and statesman (d. 1695)
  - André Félibien, French court historian (d. 1695)
  - Andrew Ramsay, Lord Abbotshall, Scottish judge and politician (d. 1688)
- May 20 – Abiezer Coppe, English "Ranter" and pamphleteer (d. 1672)
- May 24 (bapt.) – Philips Wouwerman, Dutch painter (d. 1668)
- May 26 – King Pye Min of Burma (d. 1672)
- June 13 – Jan Victors, Dutch painter (d. 1676)
- June 14 (bapt.) – Sir Jeffrey Hudson, English court dwarf (d. 1682)
- June 24 – Rijcklof van Goens, Dutch colonial governor (d. 1682)
- July 3 – Hyojong of Joseon, 17th king of the Joseon Dynasty of Korea (1649–1659) (d. 1659)
- July 13 – Birgitta Durell, Swedish industrialist (d. 1683)
- July 27 – Sir Henry Felton, 2nd Baronet, English Member of Parliament (d. 1690)
- August 5 – Thomas Hall, English politician (d. 1667)
- August 6 – Barbara Strozzi, Italian singer and composer (d. 1677)
- August 7 – Anna Catherine Constance Vasa, Polish princess, daughter of King Sigismund III Vasa (d. 1651)
- August 15
  - Francesco Maria Farnese, Italian Catholic cardinal (d. 1647)
  - Hubertus Quellinus, Flemish artist (d. 1687)
- August 21 – Sir John Borlase, 1st Baronet, English politician (d. 1672)
- August 28
  - Anne Geneviève de Bourbon, French princess who is remembered for her beauty and amours (d. 1679)
  - Louis Thomassin, French bishop and theologian (d. 1695)
- August 29 – Jean-Baptiste Colbert, French minister of finance (d. 1683)
- September 20 – Sophie Elisabeth Pentz, daughter of Christian IV of Denmark (d. 1657)
- September 21 – Sir John Wray, 3rd Baronet, English politician (d. 1664)
- October 8 – Philipp von Zesen, German poet (d. 1689)
- October 10
  - Josias Calmady, English Member of Parliament (d. 1683)
  - Princess Elisabeth Sophie of Saxe-Altenburg, German princess (d. 1680)
- October 14 – Sir John Bright, 1st Baronet, English politician (d. 1688)
- October 16 – Johann Friedrich König, German Lutheran theologian (d. 1664)
- October 18 – Jean Armand de Maillé-Brézé, French admiral (d. 1646)
- October 27 – Frederick Louis, Count Palatine of Zweibrücken (d. 1681)
- November 5 – Philips Koninck, Dutch painter (d. 1688)
- November 7 – Gédéon Tallemant des Réaux, French writer known for his Historiettes (d. 1692)
- November 14 – Thomas Howard, 3rd Earl of Berkshire, English politician, earl (d. 1706)
- November 25 – Henry Mildmay, English politician (d. 1692)
- December 10 – Thomas Dyke, English politician (d. 1669)
- December 13 – Andrij Savka, Lemko bandit (d. 1661)
- December 17 – Prince Rupert of the Rhine, Bohemian-born Royalist commander in the English Civil War (d. 1682)
- December 28 – Antoine Furetière, French writer (d. 1688)
- December 31
  - John Fitzjames, English politician (d. 1670)
  - Sylvester Maurus, Italian Jesuit theologian (d. 1687)
- Donald Cargill, Scottish Covenanter (d. 1681)
- Gu Mei, politically influential Chinese Gējì, poet and painter (d. 1664)
- Samuel Collins, English doctor and author (d. 1670)
- Francisco Fernández de la Cueva, 8th Duke of Alburquerque, Spanish military officer and viceroy (d. 1676)
- Willem Kalf, Dutch painter (d. 1693)
- Kumazawa Banzan, Japanese philosopher (d. 1691)
- Shalom Shabazi, Jewish Yemeni rabbi and poet (d. c. 1720)
- Wang Fuzhi, Chinese philosopher (d. 1692)

== Deaths ==
1610

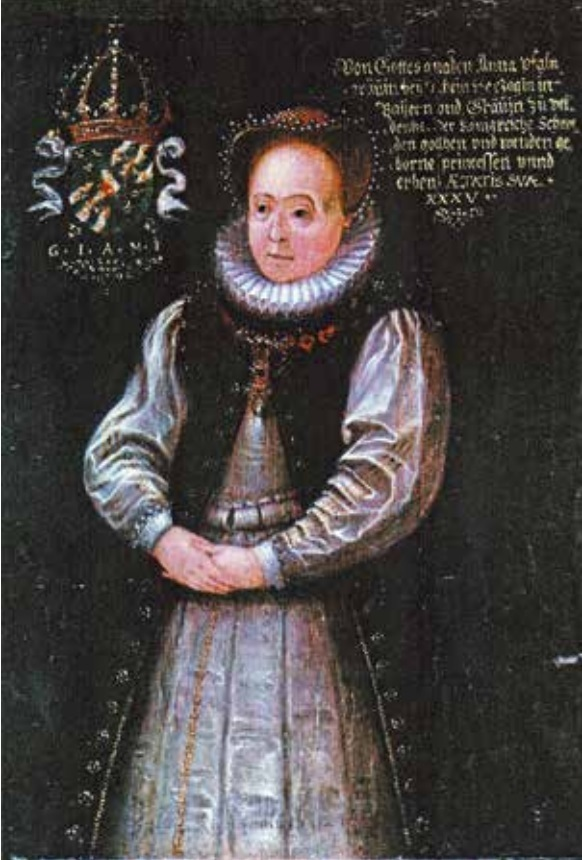
Princess Anna Maria of Sweden

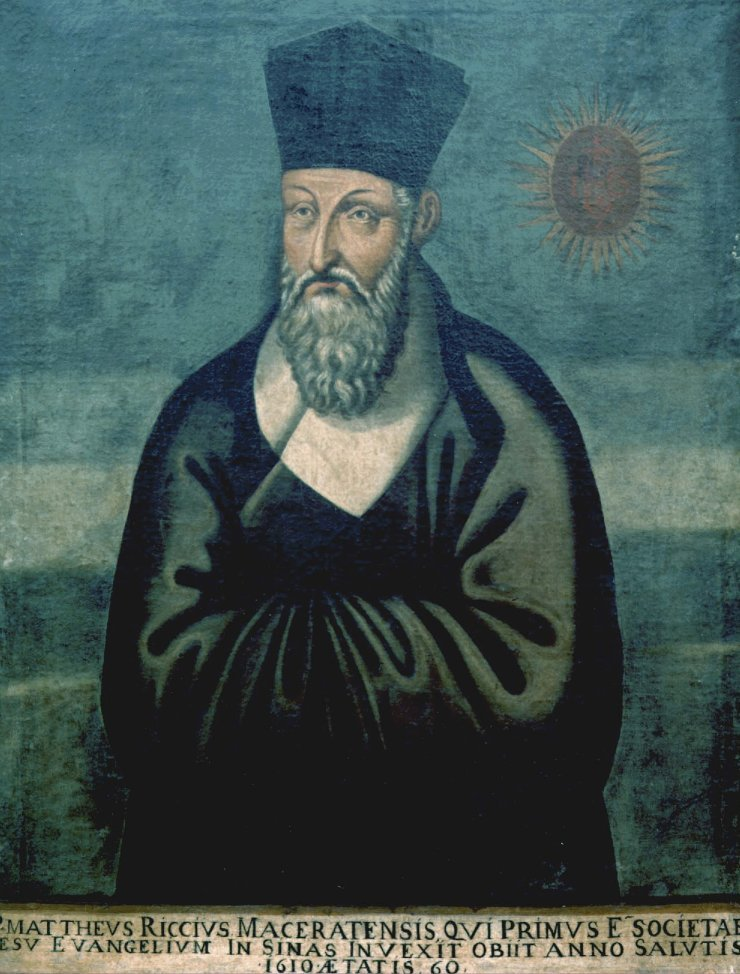
Servant of God Matteo Ricci

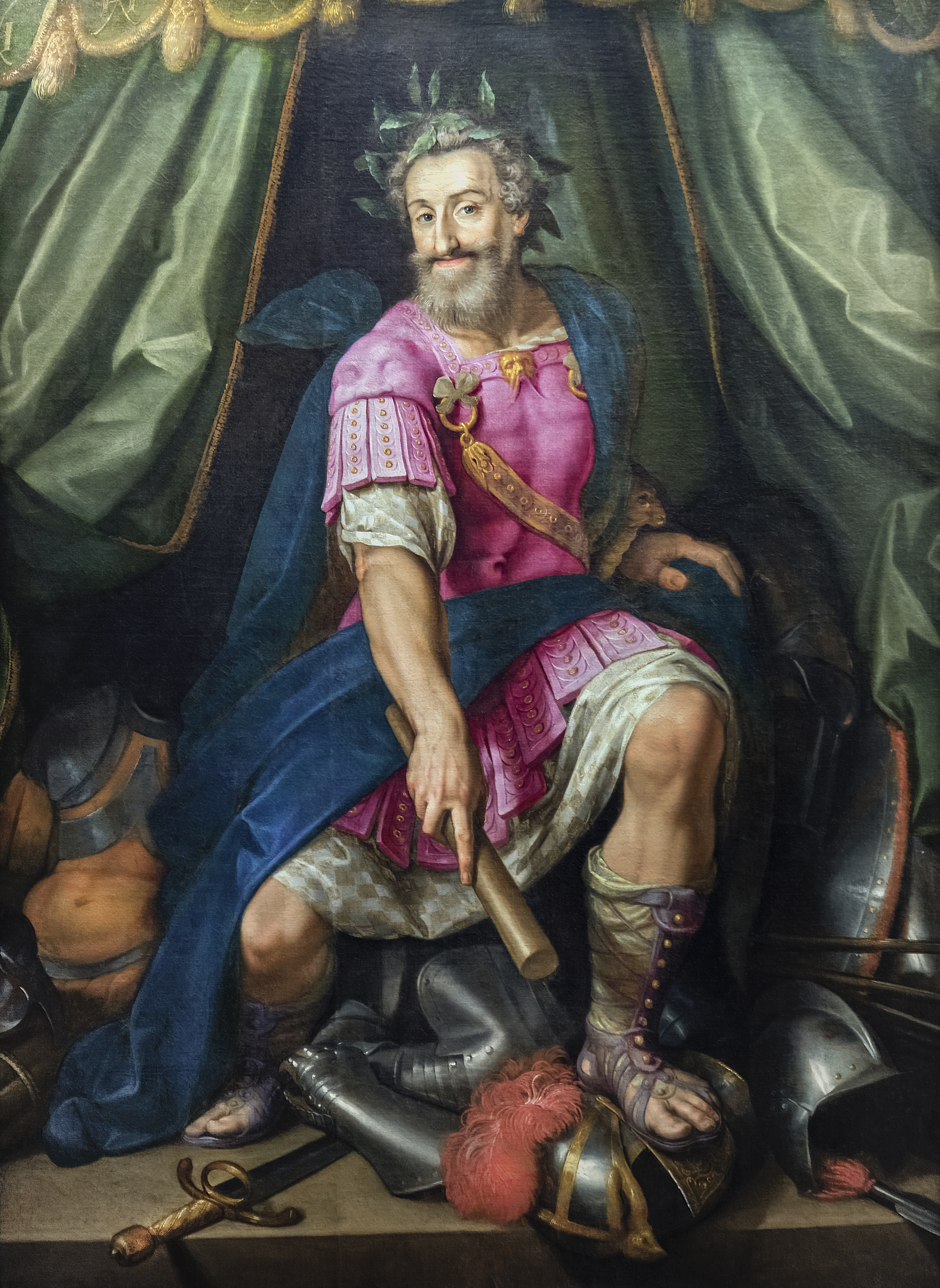
King Henry IV of France

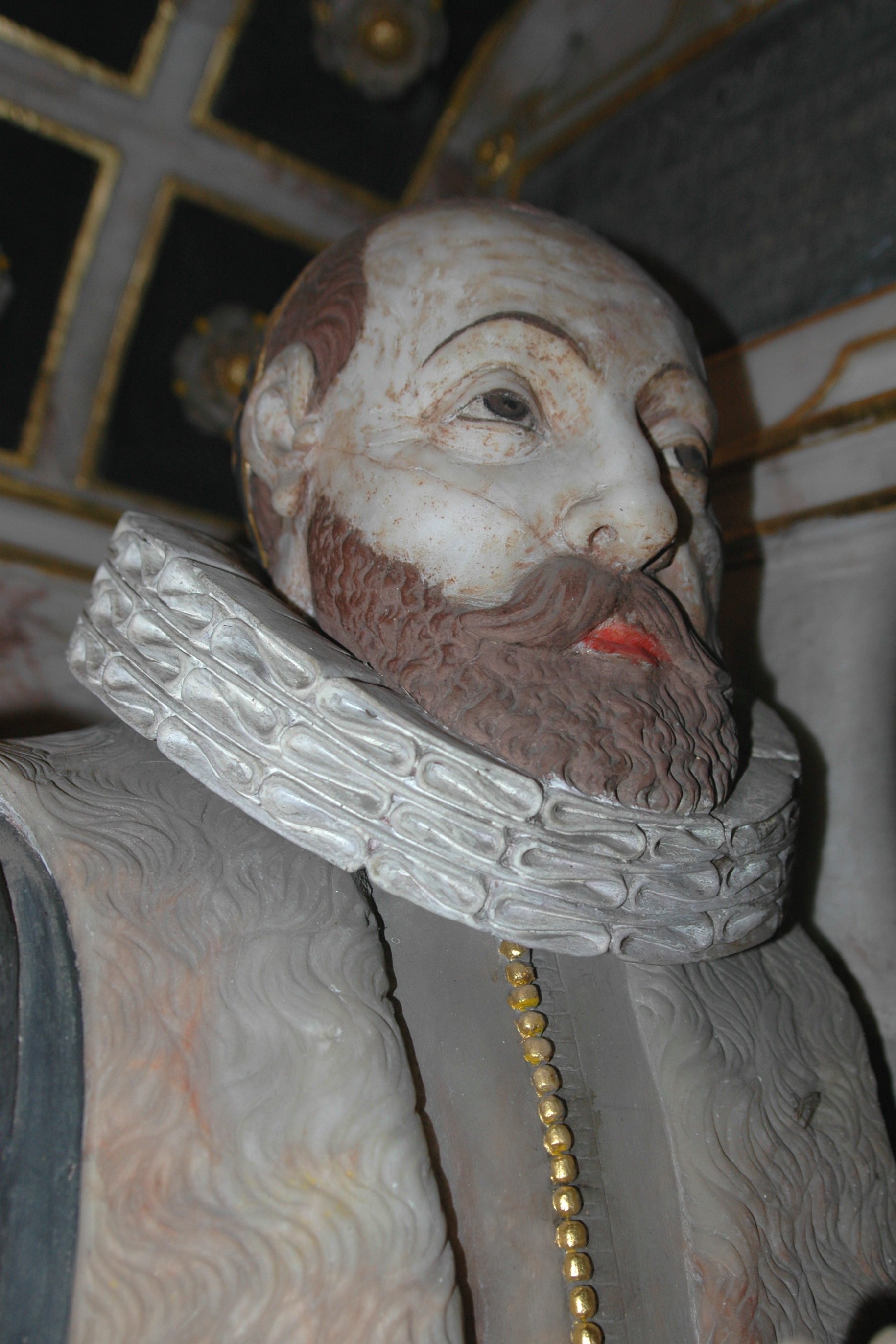
Thomas Tesdale

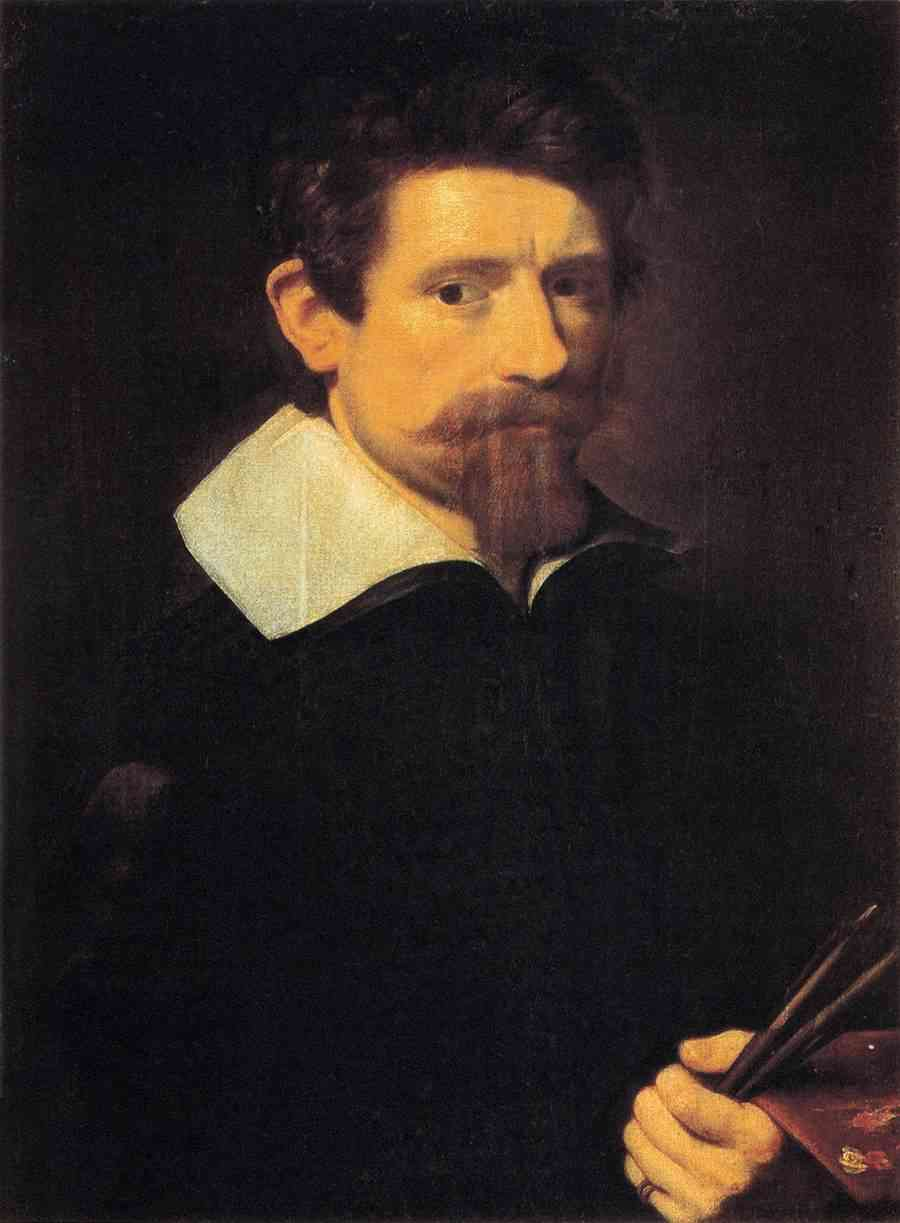
Adam Elsheimer

- January 1
  - Cinzio Passeri Aldobrandini, Italian Catholic cardinal (b. 1551)
  - François Feuardent, French theologian (b. 1539)
- January 9 – Herman van der Mast, Dutch Renaissance painter from the Northern Netherlands (b. c. 1550)
- January 10 – Mateo de Oviedo, Archbishop of Dublin (b. 1547)
- February 4 – Hannibal Vyvyan, English politician (b. 1545)
- February 5 – Strange Jørgenssøn, Norwegian businessman (b. 1539)
- February 22 – Polykarp Leyser the Elder, German theologian (b. 1552)
- February 27 – Philippe Canaye, French diplomat (b. 1551)
- March 6 – Benedict Pereira, Spanish theologian (b. 1535)
- March 7 – Maria, Abbess of Quedlinburg, German abbess (b. 1571)
- March 19
  - Valeriano Muti, Italian Catholic prelate (year of birth unknown)
  - Hasegawa Tōhaku, Japanese painter (b. 1539)
- March 20 – Princess Anna Maria of Sweden, Swedish royal (b. 1545)
- March 24 – Henry Cocke, English politician (b. 1538)
- March 28 – Wolfgang, Count of Hohenlohe-Weikersheim, German count (b. 1546)
- March 30 – Thomas Gorges, English knight (b. 1536)
- April 7 – Hirata Masumune, Japanese samurai (b. 1566)
- April 15 – Robert Parsons, English Jesuit priest (b. 1546)
- April 24 – Anna of Holstein-Gottorp, German noblewoman (b. 1575)
- May 11
  - Ikoma Kazumasa, Japanese samurai (b. 1555)
  - Matteo Ricci, Italian Jesuit priest and servant of God (b. 1552)
- May 14 – King Henry IV of France, (assassinated) (b. 1553)
- May 17 – Gervase Babington, English churchman (b. 1549)
- May 19 – Thomas Sanchez, Spanish theologian (b. 1550)
- May 27 – François Ravaillac, French assassin of Henry IV of France (executed) (b. 1578)
- June 4 – David Hilchen, Baltic German humanist and politician (b. 1561)
- June 13 – Thomas Tesdale, English maltster (b. 1547)

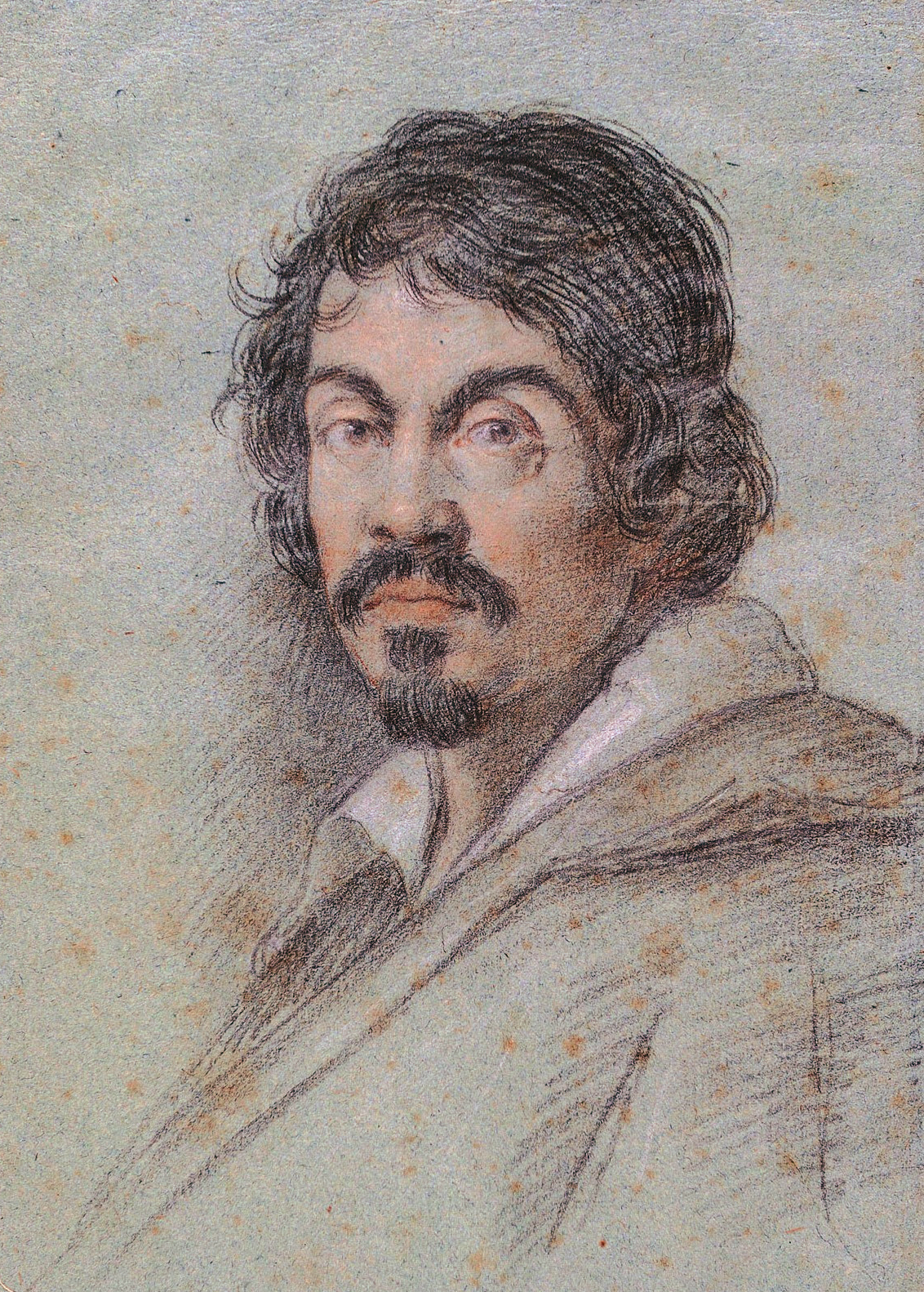
Caravaggio

- July – Richard Knolles, English historian (b. 1545)
- July 14 – Francis Solanus, Spanish friar and missionary in South America (b. 1549)
- July 17 – Amandus Polanus, German writer (b. 1561)
- July 18 – Michelangelo Merisi da Caravaggio, Italian painter active in Rome (b. 1571)
- July 22 – Charles I, Duke of Mecklenburg (b. 1540)
- July 27 – Jacob van Langren, Dutch cartographer and globe-maker (b. 1525)
- August 20 – Stanisław Stadnicki, Polish nobleman (b. 1551)
- August 25 – Mabel Browne, Countess of Kildare, Irish noble (b. 1536)
- September 13 – Tomás de Borja y Castro, Spanish Catholic archbishop (b. 1551)
- September 19 – Frederick IV, Elector Palatine (b. 1574)
- September 22 – Jan Moretus, Belgian printer (b. 1543)
- October 14 – Amago Yoshihisa, Japanese samurai and warlord (b. 1540)
- November 2 – Richard Bancroft, Archbishop of Canterbury (b. 1544)
- November 24 – Duchess Sophie of Prussia, duchess consort of Courland (1609–1610) (b. 1582)
- December 3 – Honda Tadakatsu, Japanese soldier (b. 1548)
- December 10 – John Roberts, Welsh Benedictine monk and priest (b. 1577)
- December 11
  - Adam Elsheimer, German artist working in Rome who died at only thirty-two (b. 1578)
  - False Dmitry II, pretender to the Russian throne
- December 21 – Catherine Vasa, Swedish princess (b. 1539)
- December 31 – Ludolph van Ceulen, German mathematician (b. 1540)

1611

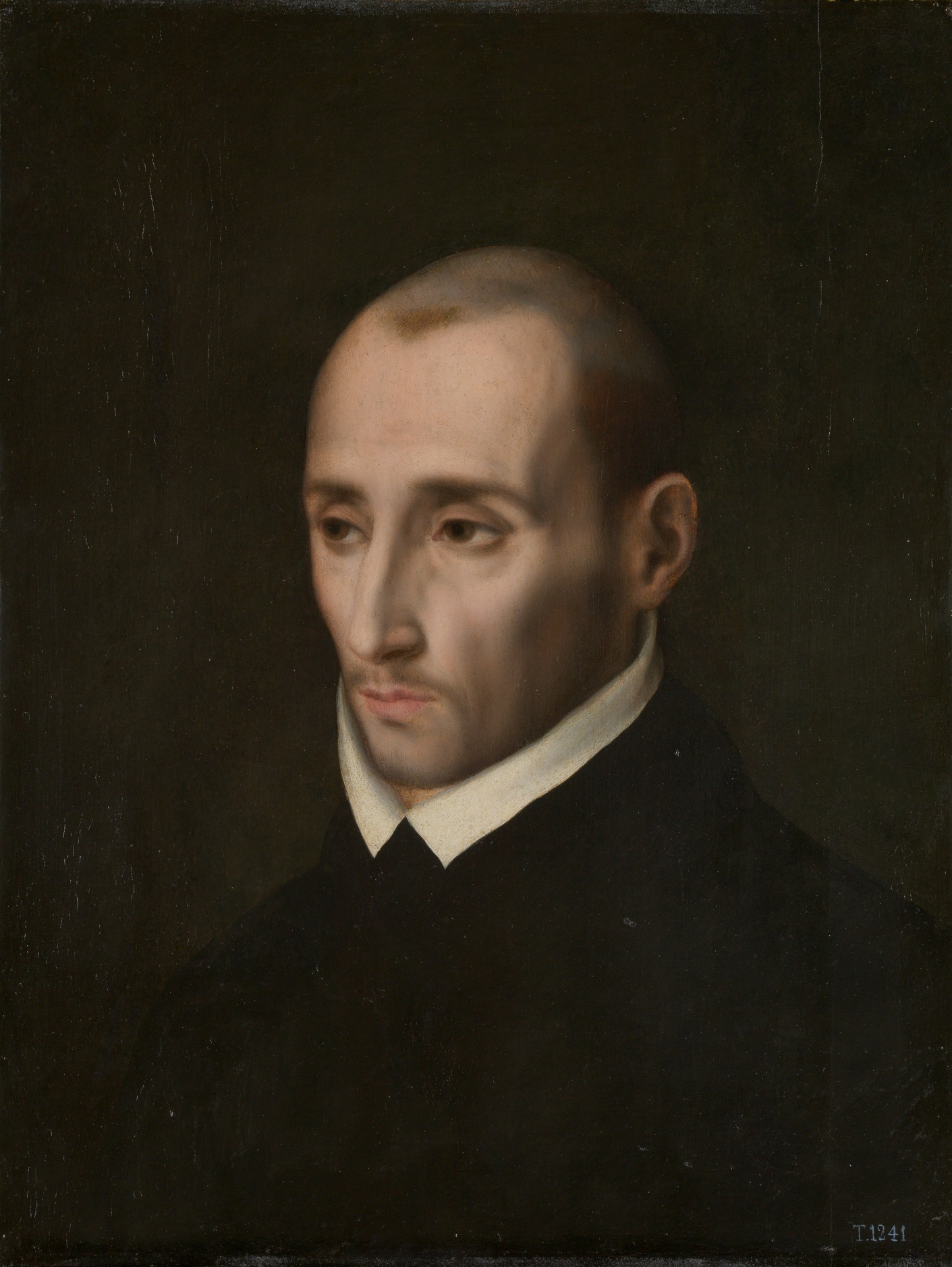
Juan de Ribera

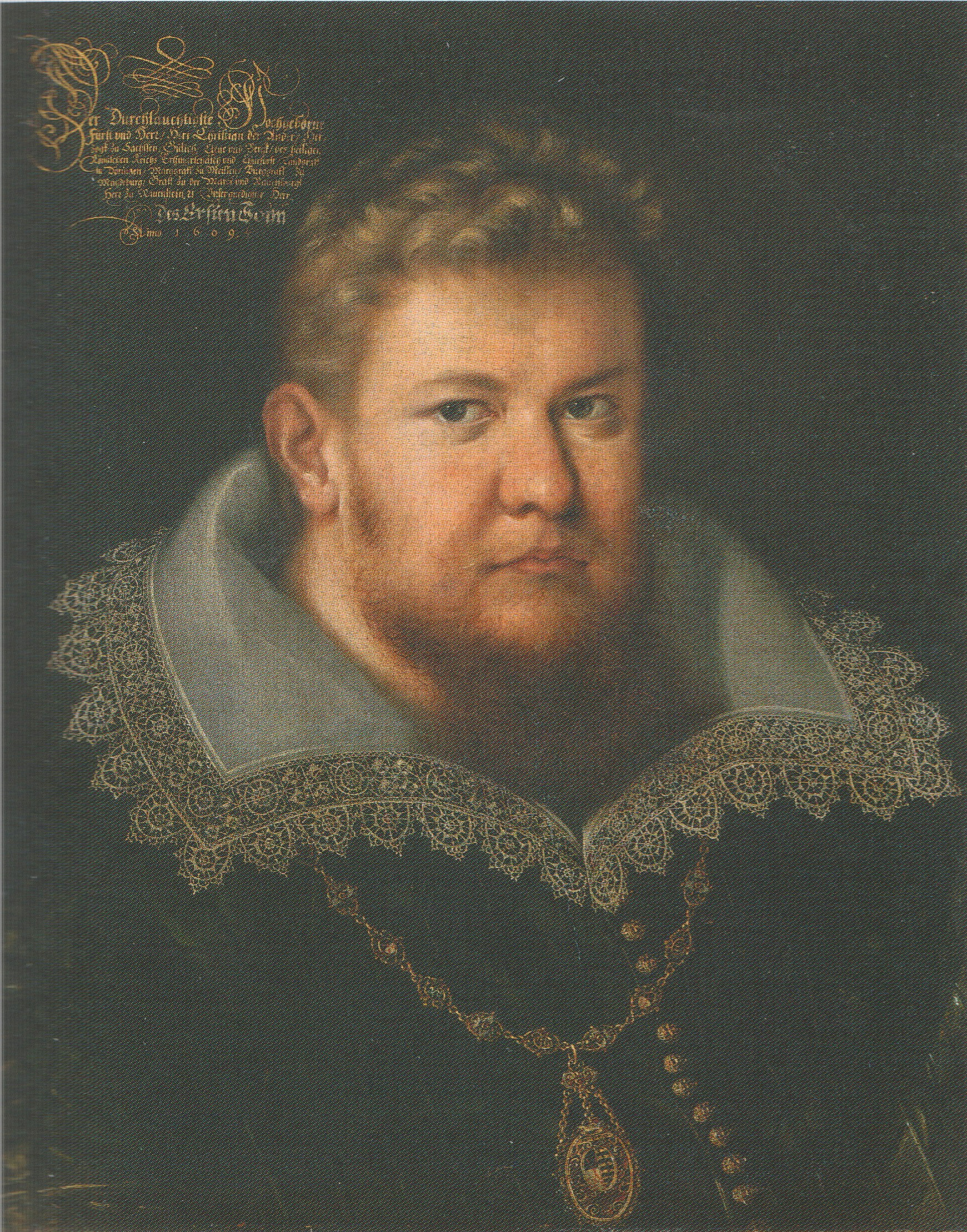
Christian II, Elector of Saxony

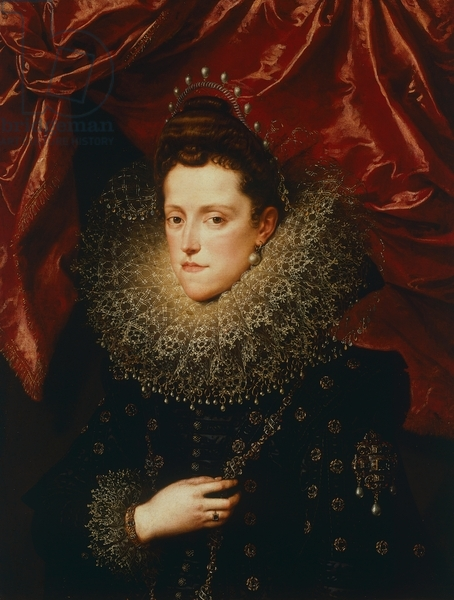
Eleanor de' Medici

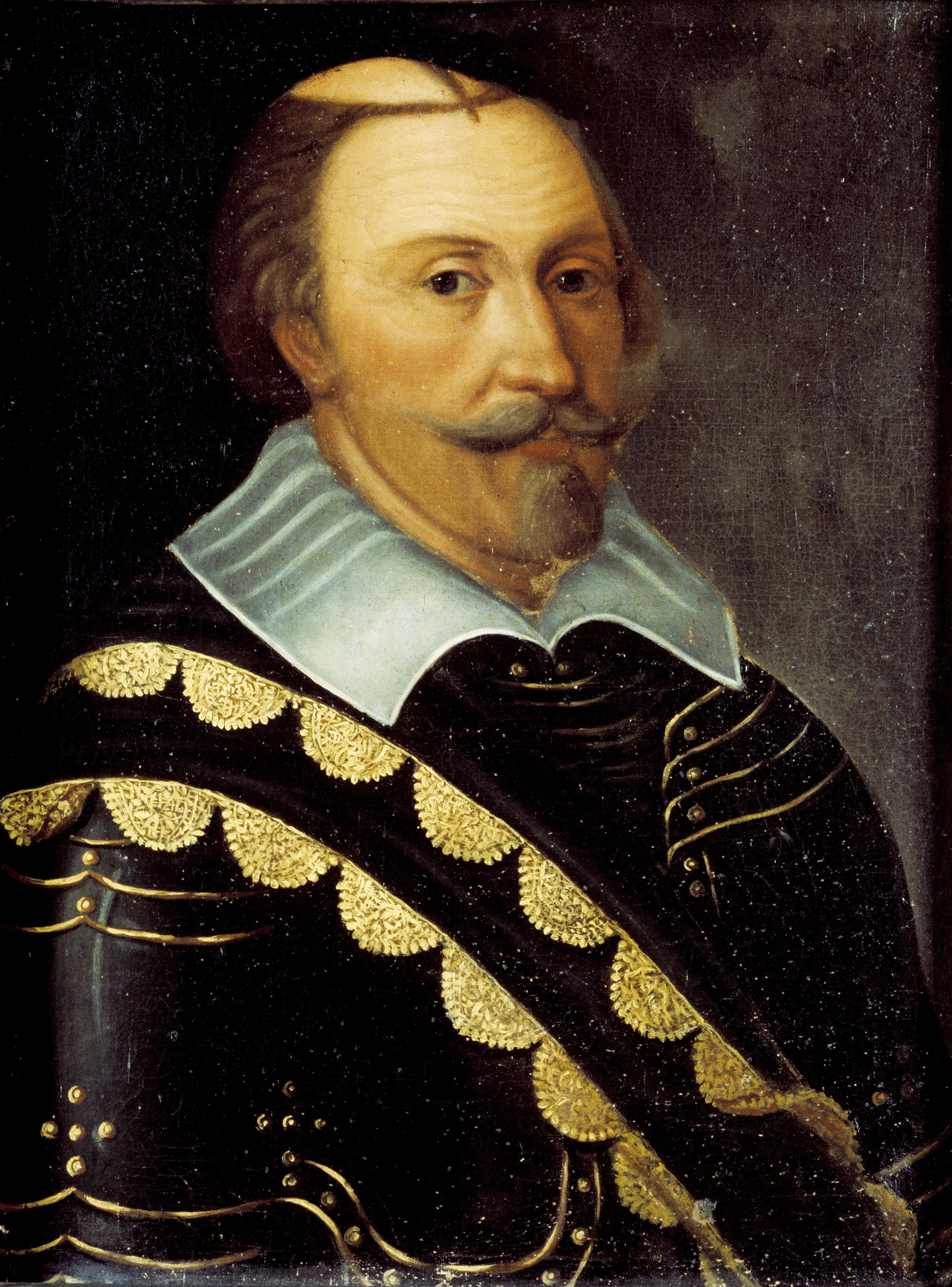
Charles IX of Sweden

- January 6 – Juan de Ribera, Spanish Catholic archbishop (b. 1532)
- January 16 – Niiro Tadamoto, Japanese samurai (b. 1526)
- February 7 – Ruprecht von Eggenberg, Austrian general (b. 1546)
- February 12 – Henry Lee of Ditchley, English noble (b. 1533)
- February 26 – Antonio Possevino, Italian Jesuit protagonist of Counter Reformation, papal diplomat (b. 1533)
- March 2 – Ernest II, Duke of Brunswick-Lüneburg, (b. 1564)
- March 3 – William Douglas, 10th Earl of Angus, son of William Douglas (b. 1552)
- March 5 – Shimazu Yoshihisa, Japanese warlord and samurai (b. 1533)
- March 13 – Louis III, Count of Löwenstein since 1541 (b. 1530)
- March 17 – Princess Sophia of Sweden (b. 1547)
- March 20 – Johann Georg Gödelmann, German demonologist (b. 1559)
- April 23 – Martin Ruland the Younger, German alchemist (b. 1569)
- May 19
  - Frederick IX, Margrave of Brandenburg, Grand Master of the Order of Saint John (b. 1588)
  - Zhu Zaiyu, Chinese mathematician, music theorist (b. 1536)
- June 8 – Jean Bertaut, French poet (b. 1552)
- June 23 – Christian II, Elector of Saxony (b. 1583)
- July 9 – János Imreffy, Hungarian politician (b. 1559)
- July 26 – Horio Yoshiharu, Japanese warlord (b. 1542)
- August – Antoni Clarassó i Terès, Spanish priest
- August 2 – Katō Kiyomasa, Japanese warlord and samurai (b. 1561)
- August 9 – John Blagrave, English mathematician (b. 1561)
- August 12 – Herman van den Bergh, Dutch soldier in the Eighty Years' War (b. 1558)
- August 27 – Tomás Luis de Victoria, Spanish composer (b. c. 1548)
- September 9 – Eleanor de' Medici, Italian noblewoman (b. 1567)
- September 17 – Johannes Corputius, Dutch engineer, cartographer and military leader (b. 1542)
- September 18 – John Augustus, Count Palatine of Lützelstein, German count (b. 1575)
- September 25 – Šurhaci, Chinese prince (b. 1564)
- October 3
  - Margaret of Austria, Queen of Spain (b. 1584)
  - Charles of Lorraine, Duke of Mayenne, French military leader (b. 1554)
- October 11 – Thomas Blague, English priest and writer (b. 1545)
- October 30 – King Charles IX of Sweden (b. 1550)
- November 6 – Peter Vok, Czech noble (b. 1539)
- November 17 – Nicolas Henri, Duke of Orléans, French duke (b. 1607)
- November 22 – Thomas Berkeley, English politician (b. 1575)
- Camillo Mariani, Italian sculptor (b. 1565)
- Tiryaki Hasan Pasha, Turkish beylerbey (b. 1530)
- Henry Hudson, English explorer

1612

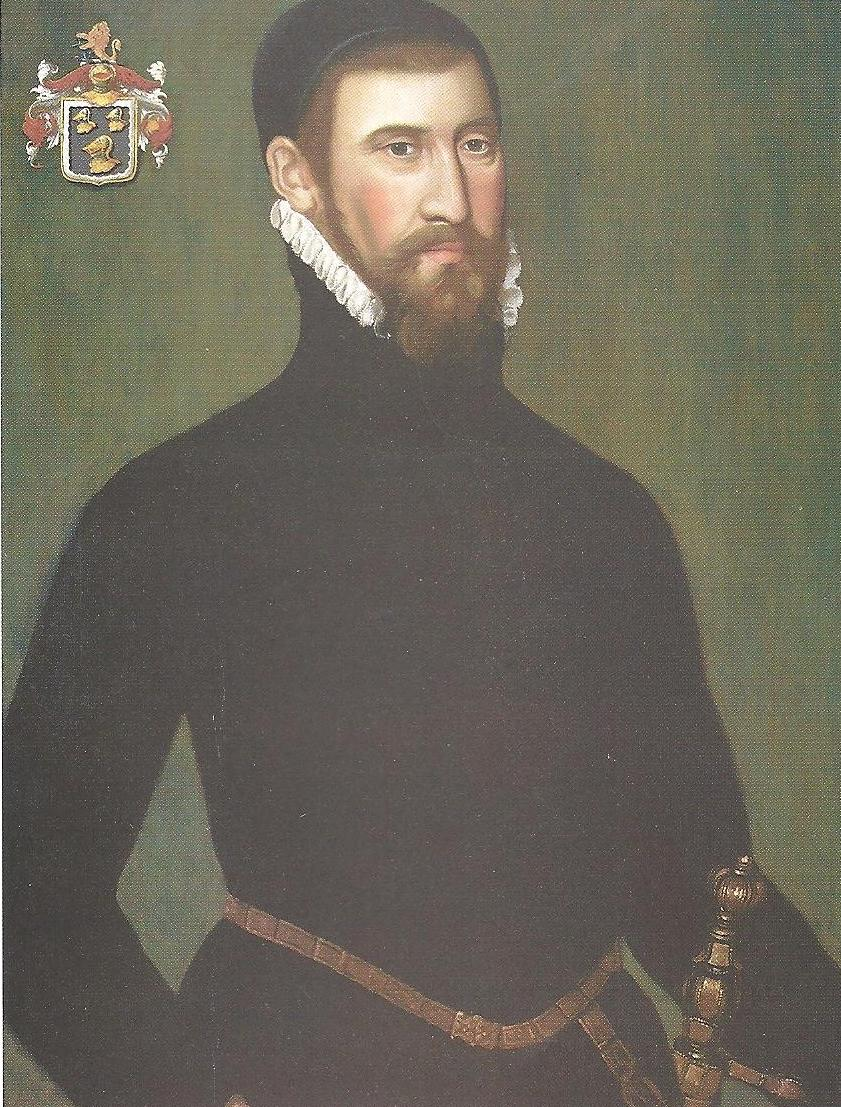
Leonard Holliday

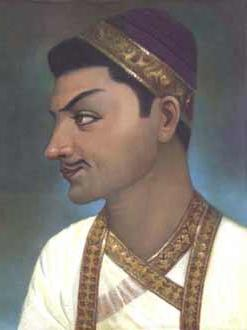
Muhammad Quli Qutb Shah

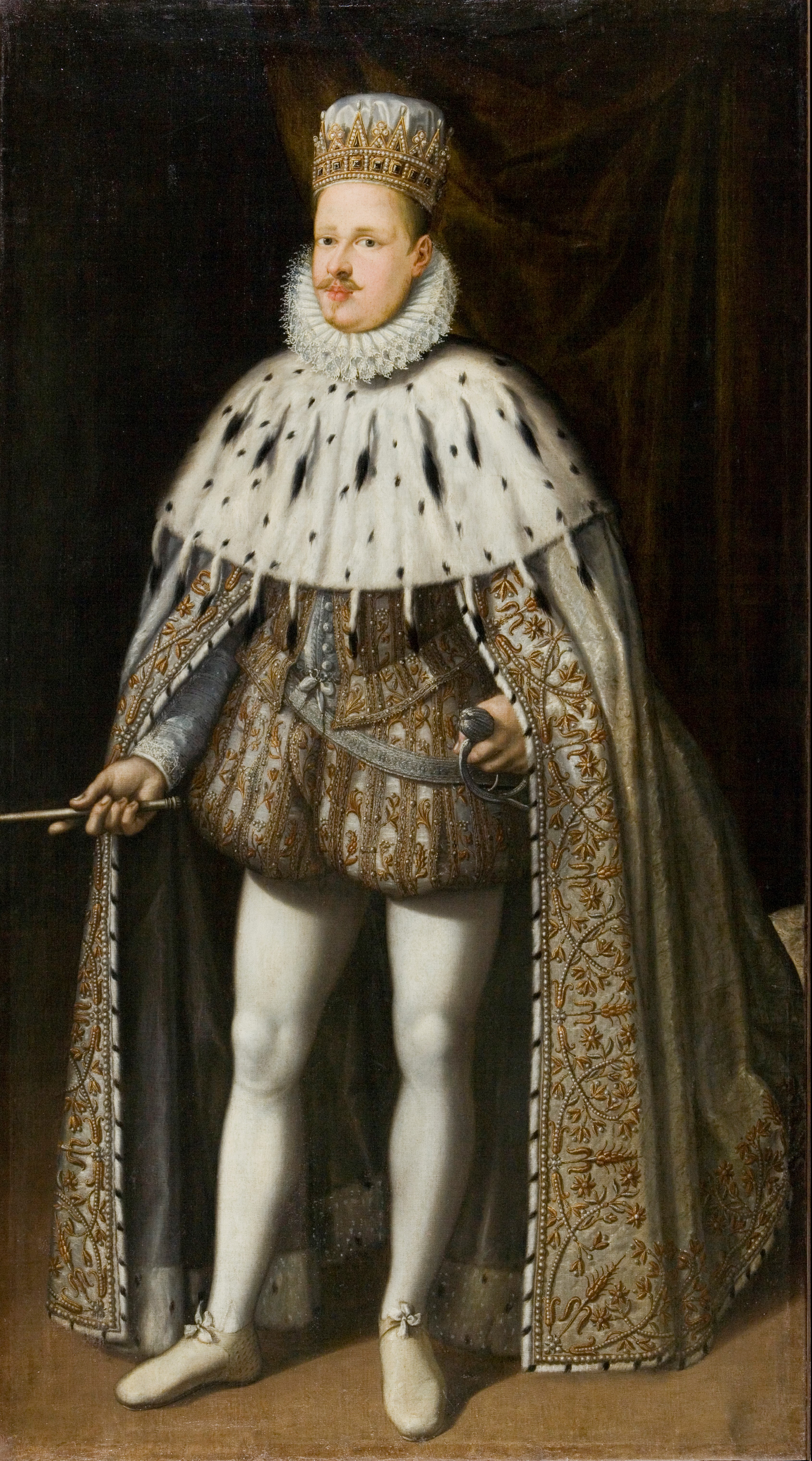
Vincenzo Gonzaga, Duke of Mantua

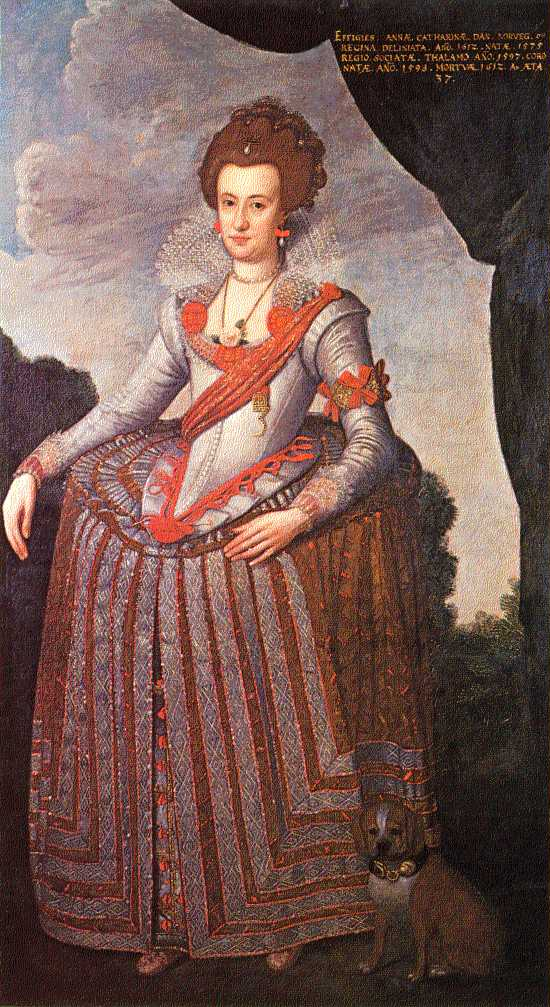
Anne Catherine of Brandenburg

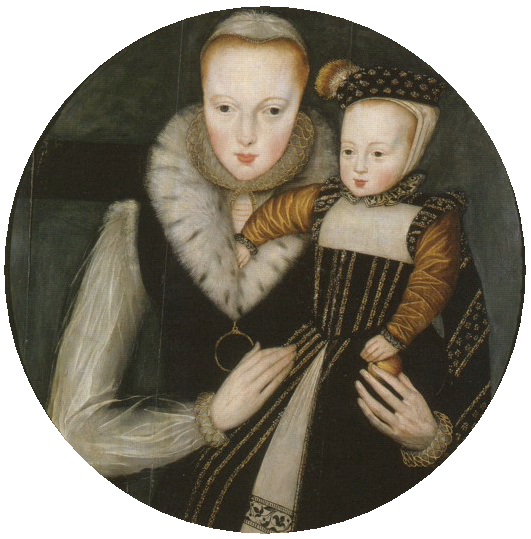
Edward Seymour, Lord Beauchamp

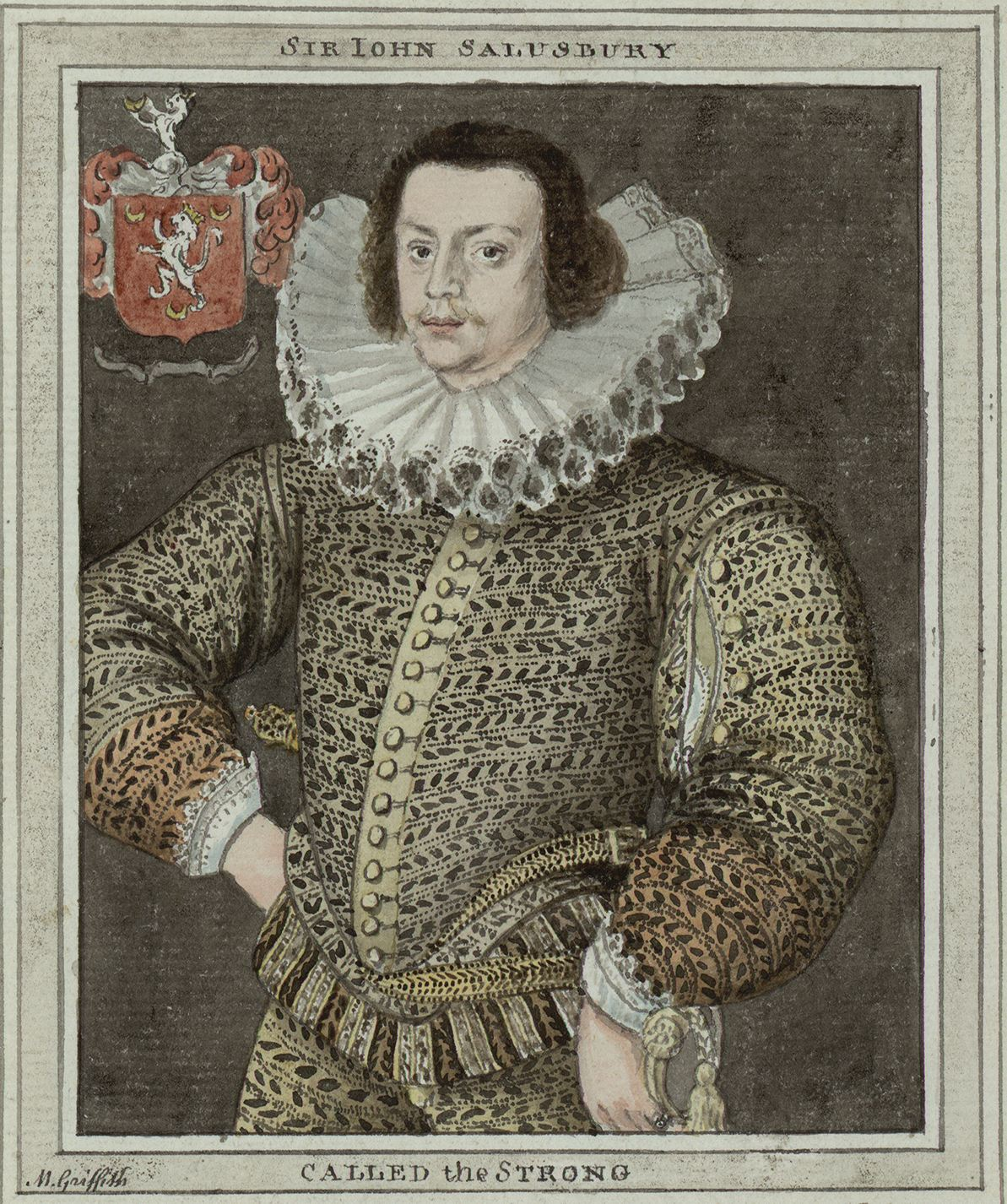
John Salusbury

- January 4 – Hendrik Laurenszoon Spiegel, Dutch writer (b. 1549)
- January 9 – Leonard Holliday, Lord Mayor of London, 1605-1606 (b. 1550)
- January 11 – Muhammad Quli Qutb Shah, fifth sultan of the Qutb Shahi Dynasty of Golkonda; founded the city of Hyderabad (b. 1565)
- January 12 – Charles III de Croÿ, Belgian noble (b. 1560)
- January 13 – Jane Dormer, English lady-in-waiting to Mary I (b. 1538)
- January 20 – Rudolf II, Holy Roman Emperor, Austrian Habsburg ruler (b. 1552)
- February 6 – Christopher Clavius, German mathematician and astronomer (b. 1538)
- February 9 – Vincenzo Gonzaga, Duke of Mantua (b. 1562)
- February 12 – Jodocus Hondius, Flemish cartographer (b. 1563)
- February 17 – Ernest of Bavaria, German Catholic bishop (b. 1554)
- February 18 – Roberto di Ridolfi, Italian conspirator against Elizabeth I of England (b. 1531)
- February 21 – Christian Barnekow, Danish noble, explorer and diplomat (b. 1556)
- March 16 – Margaret Fiennes, 11th Baroness Dacre (b. 1541)
- March 18 – Bartholomew Legate, English anti-Trinitarian martyr (b. c. 1575)
- March 19 – Sophia Olelkovich Radziwill, Polish-Lithuanian noble (b. 1585)
- April 5 – Diana Scultori, Italian engraver
- April 8 – Anne Catherine of Brandenburg (b. 1575)
- April 11
  - Emanuel van Meteren, Flemish historian (b. 1535)
  - Edward Wightman, English Baptist preacher (burned at the stake) (b. 1580)
- April 19 – Anne d'Escars de Givry, French Catholic cardinal (b. 1546)
- April 21 – David van Goorle, theologian and theoretical scientist (b. 1591)
- May – False Dmitry III, pretender to the Russian throne (secretly executed)
- May 19 – Gregorio Petrocchini, Italian Cardinal Bishop, Conclave member, Cardinal protector of the Augustines (b. 1535)
- May 24 – Robert Cecil, 1st Earl of Salisbury, English statesman and spymaster (b. 1563)
- May 31 – Willem Isaacsz Swanenburg, Dutch engraver (b. 1580)
- June 5 – Arima Harunobu, Japanese daimyō (b. 1567)
- June 8 – Hans Leo Hassler, German composer (b. 1562)
- June 21 – Edward Seymour, Lord Beauchamp (b. 1561)
- June 26 – Roger Manners, 5th Earl of Rutland, eldest surviving son of John Manners (b. 1576)
- July 16 – Leonardo Donato, Doge of Venice (b. 1536)
- July 24
  - Ottavio Mirto Frangipani, Italian bishop and papal diplomat (b. 1544)
  - John Salusbury, Welsh politician (b. 1567)
- July 29 – Jacques Bongars, French scholar and diplomat (b. 1554)
- August 3 – John Bond, English politician and classicist (b. 1550)
- August 4 – Hugh Broughton, English scholar (b. 1549)
- August 9 – Philipp Ludwig II, Count of Hanau-Münzenberg (1580–1612) (b. 1576)
- August 12 – Giovanni Gabrieli, Italian composer (b. c. 1554)
- August 15 – Michael Hicks, English politician (b. 1543)
- August 18 – Giacomo Boncompagni, Italian feudal lord of the 16th century (b. 1548)
- August 20 – Naitō Nobunari, Japanese samurai and daimyō of Omi Province (b. 1545)
- September 9 – Nakagawa Hidenari, Japanese warlord (b. 1570)
- September 12 – Tsar Vasili IV of Russia (b. 1552)
- September 13 – Karin Månsdotter, Queen of Sweden (b. 1550)
- September 24 – Johannes Lippius, German theologian, philosopher, composer, and music theorist (b. 1585)
- September 27 – Piotr Skarga, Polish Jesuit and polemicist (b. 1536)
- September 28 – Ernst Soner, German physician (b. 1572)
- October 7
  - Menso Alting, Dutch preacher and reformer (b. 1541)
  - Giovanni Battista Guarini, Italian poet (b. 1538)
- October 10 – Bernardino Poccetti, Italian painter (b. 1548)
- October 23 – János Petki, Hungarian politician (b. 1572)
- October 28 – Edward Darcy, English politician (b. 1544)
- November 1 – Charles, Count of Soissons, French prince du sang and military commander in the struggles over religion and the throne (b. 1566)
- November 2 – Maurice, Duke of Saxe-Lauenburg, 1581–1612 (b. 1551)
- November 6
  - Nicholas Fitzherbert, English martyr (b. 1550)
  - Henry Frederick, Prince of Wales, elder son of King James I & VI and Anne of Denmark (b. 1594)
- November 9 – Paul Jenisch, German pastor (b. 1551)
- November 16 – William Stafford, English spy (b. 1554)
- November 20 – John Harington, English courtier, writer and inventor of a flush toilet (b. 1561)
- November 23
  - Juan Fernández de Olivera, Spanish colonial governor (b. 1560)
  - Elizabeth Jane Weston, English Czech poet (b. 1582)
- November 26 – Thomas Walmsley, English judge (b. 1537)
- December 4 – Jacob Taets van Amerongen, Teutonic Knights commander (b. 1542)
- December 12 – Nicholas Mosley, Lord Mayor of London (b. 1527)
- December 22 – Francesco IV Gonzaga, Duke of Mantua (b. 1586)
- Federico Barocci, Italian painter (b. c. 1535)
- Isabel Barreto, Spanish admiral (b. 1567)

1613

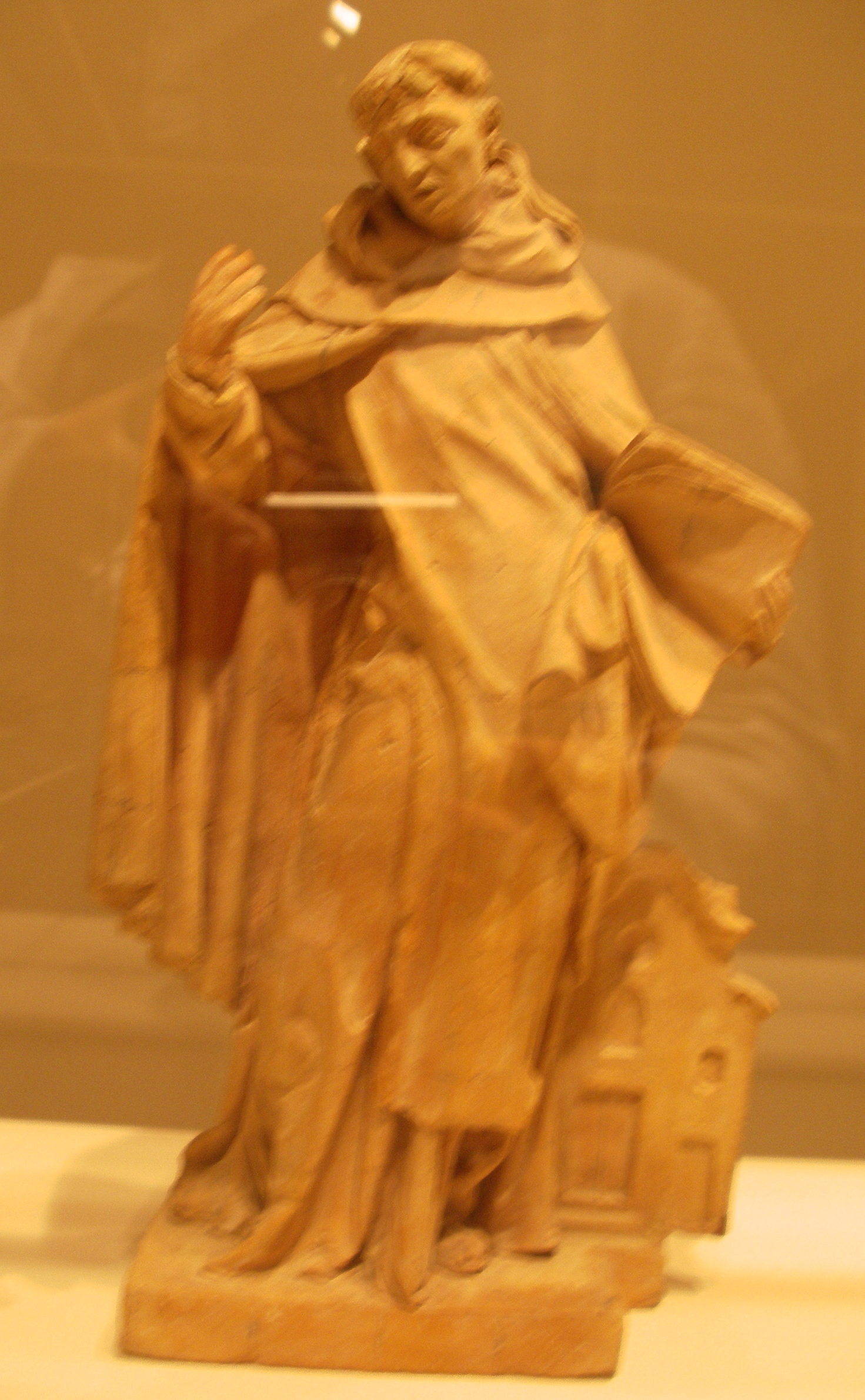
Juan García López-Rico

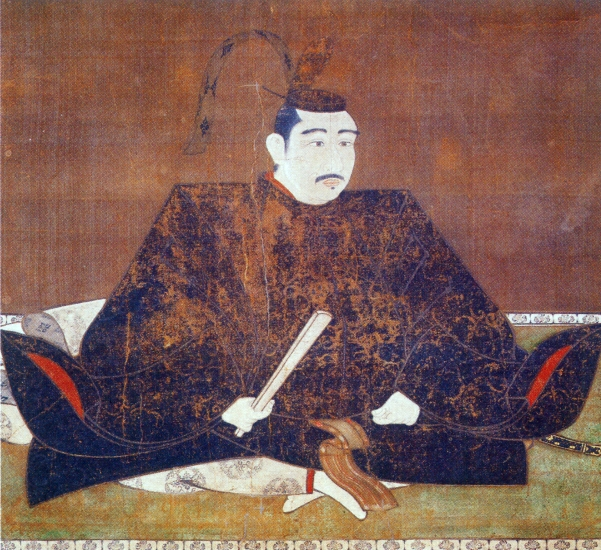
Ikeda Terumasa

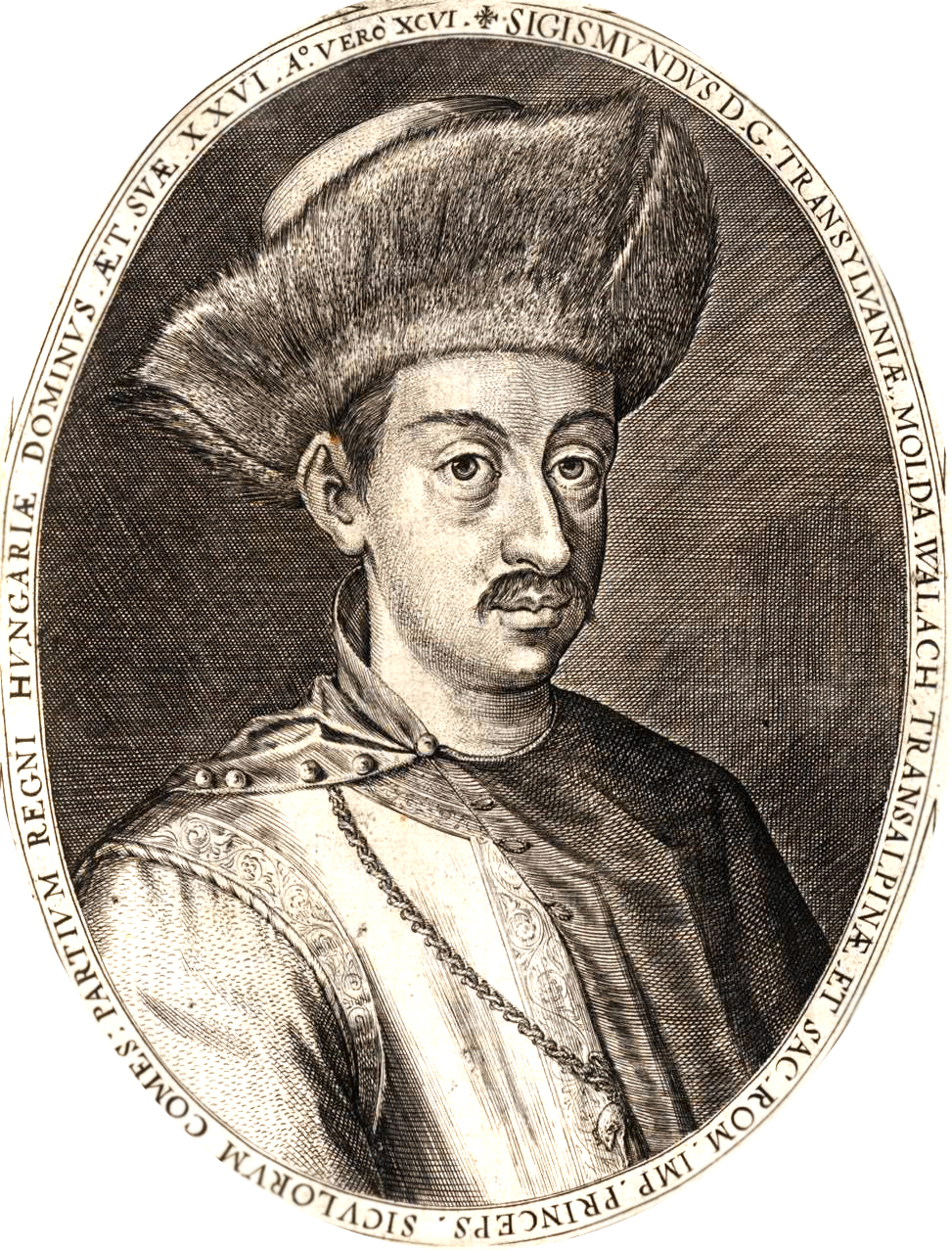
Sigismund Báthory

- January 2 – Salima Sultan Begum, Empress of the Mughal Empire (b. 1539)
- January 12 – George Blackwell, English Catholic archpriest (b. 1545)
- January 18 – Antoon Claeissens, Flemish Baroque painter (b. 1536)
- January 27 – Anna of Saxony, German noblewoman (b. 1567)
- January 28 – Thomas Bodley, English diplomat and library founder (b. 1545)
- February 14 – Juan García López-Rico, Spanish Catholic priest from the Trinitarian Order, founded the Order of Discalced Carmelites (b. 1561)
- February 16 – Johannes Letzner, German Protestant priest and historian (b. 1531)
- February 27 – Pietro Facchetti, Italian painter (b. 1539)
- March 2 – Rudolph Snellius, Dutch linguist and mathematician (b. 1546)
- March 13 – Giovanni Battista Caccini, Italian artist (b. 1556)
- March 16
  - Sigrid Sture, Swedish Governor (b. 1538)
  - Ikeda Terumasa, Japanese daimyō (b. 1565)
- March 23 – Jerónimo de Ayanz y Beaumont, Spanish inventor (b. 1553)
- March 27 – Sigismund Báthory, Prince of Transylvania (b. 1572)
- April 27 – Robert Abercromby, Scottish Jesuit missionary (b. 1532)
- June 3 – Allahverdi Khan, Georgian-born Iranian general (b. 1590)
- June 8 – Cigoli, Italian painter (b. 1559)
- June 15 – Magdalena Moons, Dutch heroine (b. 1541)
- July 2 – Bartholomaeus Pitiscus, German astronomer and mathematician (b. 1561)
- July 19 – Nicolaus van Aelst, Flemish engraver (b. 1526)
- July 20 – Sebastian Lubomirski, Polish-Lithuanian nobleman (szlachcic) (b. c. 1546)
- July 30 – Henry Julius, Duke of Brunswick-Lüneburg (b. 1564)
- August 1
  - Francesco Grimaldi, Italian architect (b. 1543)
  - Thomas Twyne, English actor (b. 1543)
- August 7 – Thomas Fleming, English judge (b. 1544)
- August 14 – David Lindsay, Scottish bishop (b. 1531)
- August 18 – Giovanni Artusi, Italian composer (b. c. 1540)
- August 22 – Dominicus Baudius, Dutch historian and poet (b. 1561)
- August 25 – William Waldegrave, English Member of Parliament (b. 1540)
- September 8
  - Carlo Gesualdo, Italian composer (b. 1566)
  - James Pemberton, British goldsmith (b. 1550)
- September 14 – Thomas Overbury, English poet and essayist (murdered) (b. 1581)
- October 9 – Henry Constable, English poet (b. 1562)
- October 11 – John Petre, 1st Baron Petre, English politician (b. 1549)
- October 22 – Mathurin Régnier, French satirist (b. 1573)
- October 26 – Johann Bauhin, Swiss botanist (b. 1541)
- October 27 – Gabriel Báthory, Prince of Transylvania (b. 1589)
- November 4 – Cristóbal Rodríguez Juárez, Spanish Catholic archbishop (b. 1547)
- November 16 – Trajano Boccalini, Italian satirist (b. 1556)
- November 21 – Rose Lok, English Marian exile (b. 1526)
- November 23 – Charles Philippe de Croÿ, Marquis d’Havré, Belgian noble and politician (b. 1549)
- November 26 – Henry Berkeley, 7th Baron Berkeley, English politician (b. 1534)
- December 6 – Anton Praetorius, German pastor (b. 1560)
- December 7 – Simon VI, Count of Lippe, imperial count and ruler of the County of Lippe (Germany) since 1563 (b. 1554)
- date unknown
  - Phùng Khắc Khoan, Vietnamese military strategist, politician, diplomat and poet (b. 1528)
  - Beatrice Michiel, Venetian spy (b. 1553)

1614

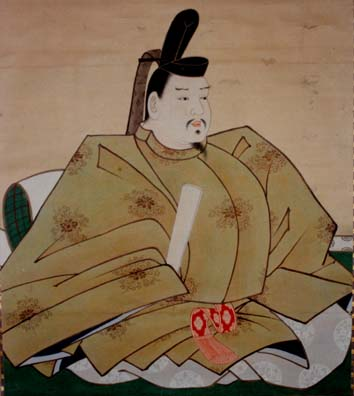
Maeda Toshinaga

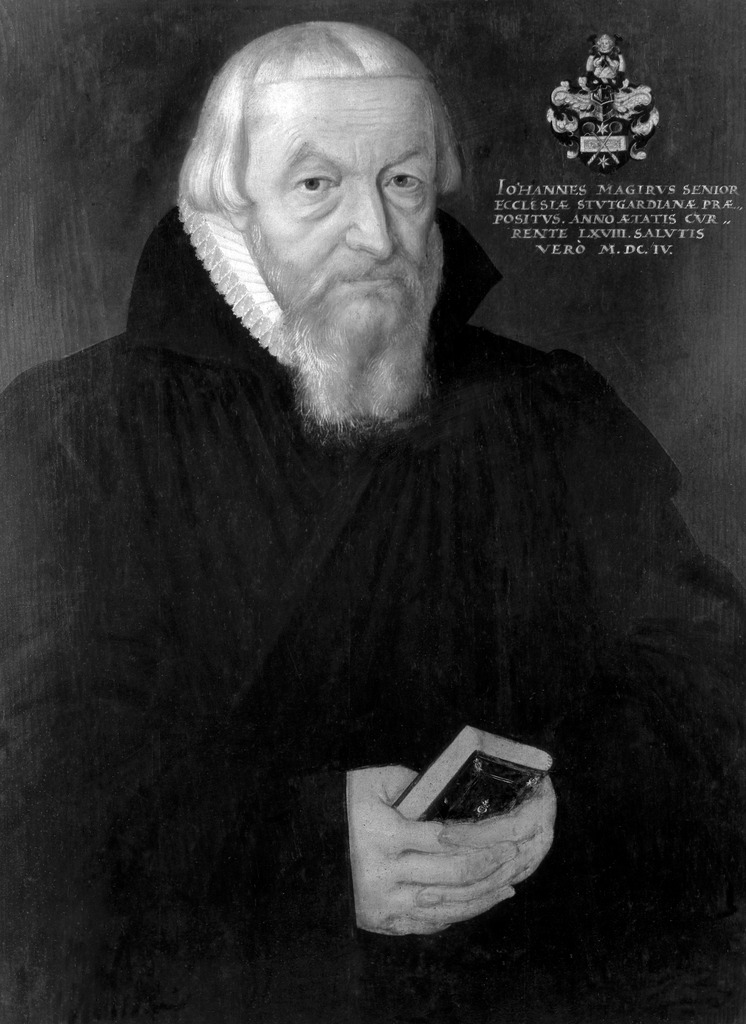
Johannes Magirus the elder

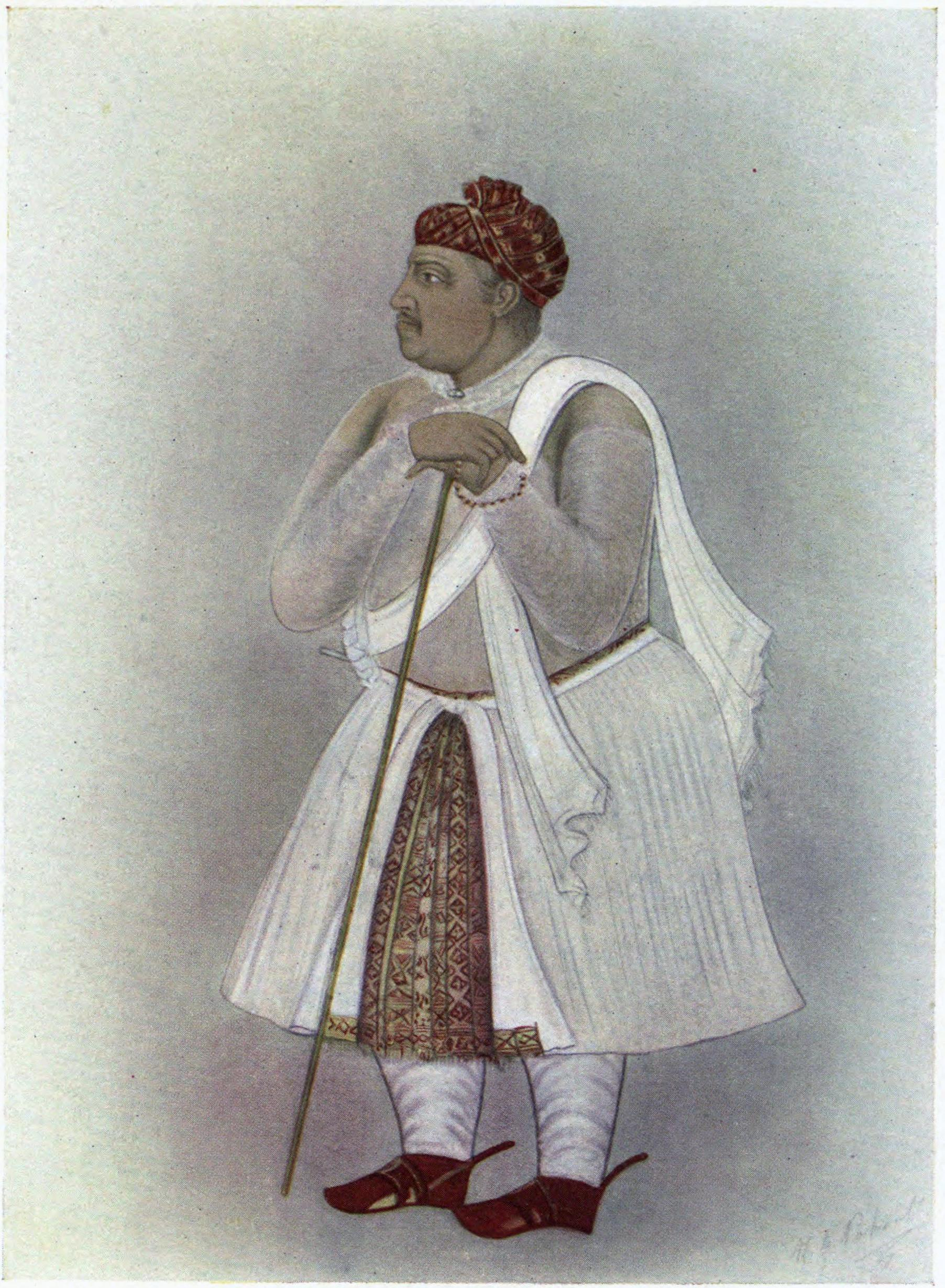
Man Singh I

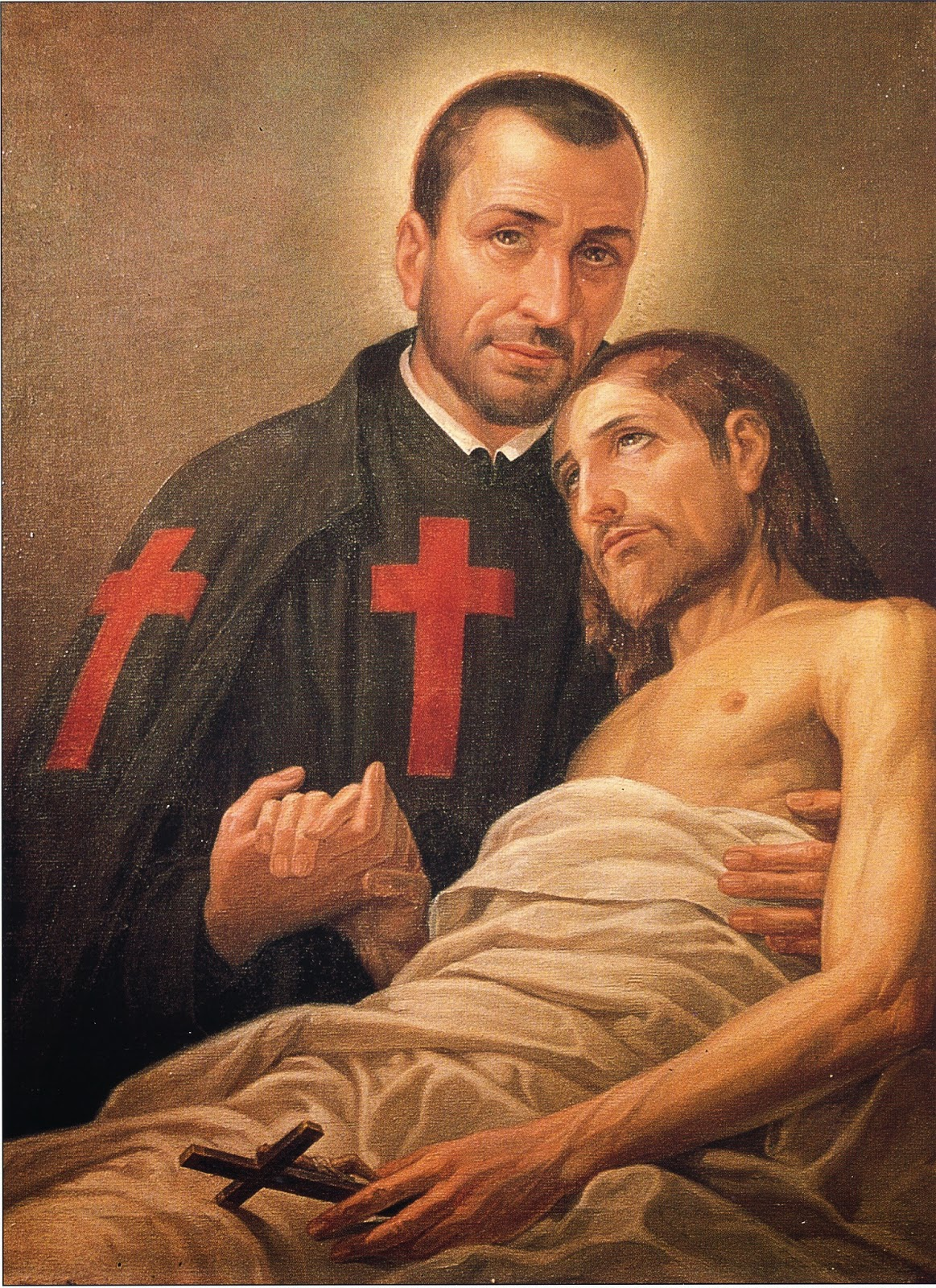
Camillus de Lellis

- January 2 – Serafino Porrecta, Italian theologian (b. 1536)
- January 21 – Morosina Morosini-Grimani, Venetian patrician and dogaressa (b. 1545)
- February 5 – Jakob Ebert, German theologian (b. 1549)
- February 13 – Thomas Cambell, Lord Mayor of London (b. 1536)
- February 23 – Murakoshi Naoyoshi, Japanese samurai (b. 1562)
- February 27 – John Harington, 2nd Baron Harington of Exton, England (b. 1592)
- February 28 – Jean Richardot the Younger, Belgian politician (b. 1570)
- March 5 – Thomas Pounde, English Jesuit lay brother (b. 1538)
- March 14 – Henrich Smet, Flemish physician (b. 1535)
- March 22 – Filippo Salviati, Italian astronomer (b. 1582)
- April 2 – Henri I de Montmorency, Marshal of France (b. 1534)
- April 7 – El Greco, or Domênikos Theotokópoulos (Greek: Δομήνικος Θεοτοκόπουλος), Cretian painter, sculptor and architect (b. 1541)
- April 28 – John Egerton, English politician (b. 1551)
- May 3 – Sasbout Vosmeer, Dutch Apostolic Vicar (b. 1548)
- June 13 – Sengoku Hidehisa, Japanese daimyō (b. 1552)
- June 15 – Henry Howard, 1st Earl of Northampton, important English aristocrat and courtier (b. 1540)
- June 17 – William Bathe, Irish Jesuit priest (b. 1564)
- June 27 – Maeda Toshinaga, Japanese daimyō (b. 1562)
- July 1
  - Maximilian of Austria, Roman Catholic prelate who served as Archbishop of Santiago de Compostela (1603–1614) (b. 1555)
  - Isaac Casaubon, French-born classical scholar (b. 1559)
- July 4 – Johannes Magirus the elder, German Lutheran theologian (b. 1537)
- July 6
  - Sir Anthony Cope, 1st Baronet, English politician (b. 1548)
  - Man Singh I, Rajput Raja of Amer, India (b. 1550)
- July 14 – Camillus de Lellis, Italian saint (b. 1550)
- July 15 – Pierre de Bourdeille, seigneur de Brantôme, French historian and biographer
- July 16 – Tsarevich Ivan Dmitriyevich, pretender to the Russian throne, son of False Dmitry II (b. 1611)
- July 19 – Akizuki Tanenaga, Japanese samurai (b. 1567)
- July 28 – Felix Plater, Swiss physician (b. 1536)
- July 30 – Walter Cope, English noble (b. 1553)
- August 3 – François de Bourbon, Prince of Conti, third son of Louis I de Bourbon (b. 1558)
- August 11 – Lavinia Fontana, Italian painter (b. 1552)
- August 21 – Elizabeth Báthory, Hungarian noblewoman and purported serial killer (b. 1560)
- August 22 – Philipp Ludwig, Count Palatine of Neuburg, Duke of Palatinate-Neuburg from 1569 until 1614 (b. 1547)
- September – Giovanni de Macque, Dutch composer (b. c. 1550)
- September 21 – Jerome Gratian, Spanish Carmelite and writer (b. 1545)
- October 2 – Carlo Sellitto, Italian painter (b. 1581)
- October 9 – Bonaventura Vulcanius, Flemish Renaissance humanist (b. 1538)
- October 15 – Peder Claussøn Friis, Norwegian clergyman and author (b. 1545)
- October 26 – Sibylla of Anhalt, Duchess consort of Württemberg (1593–1608) (b. 1564)
- November 15 – Catherine, Duchess of Braganza, Portuguese infanta (princess), claimant to the throne following the death of King Henry (b. 1540)
- November 29 – Mogami Yoshiaki, Japanese daimyō of the Yamagata domain (b. 1546)
- December 27 – Maximiliaan de Vriendt, Dutch new Latin poet and a civic office-holder in the city of Ghent (b. 1559)
- Bartholomäus Scultetus, mayor of Görlitz (b. 1540)
- Ebba Stenbock, politically active Swedish-Finnish noblewoman

1615

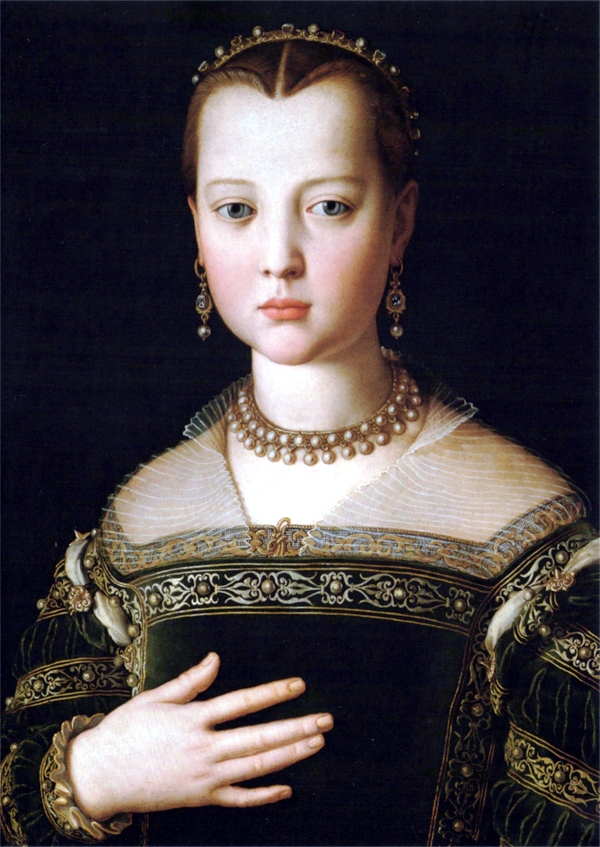
Virginia de' Medici

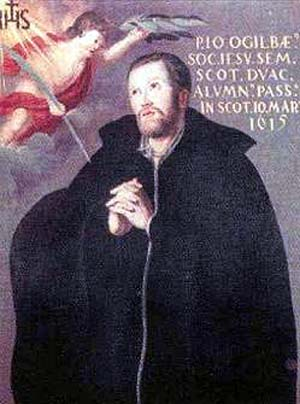
John Ogilvie

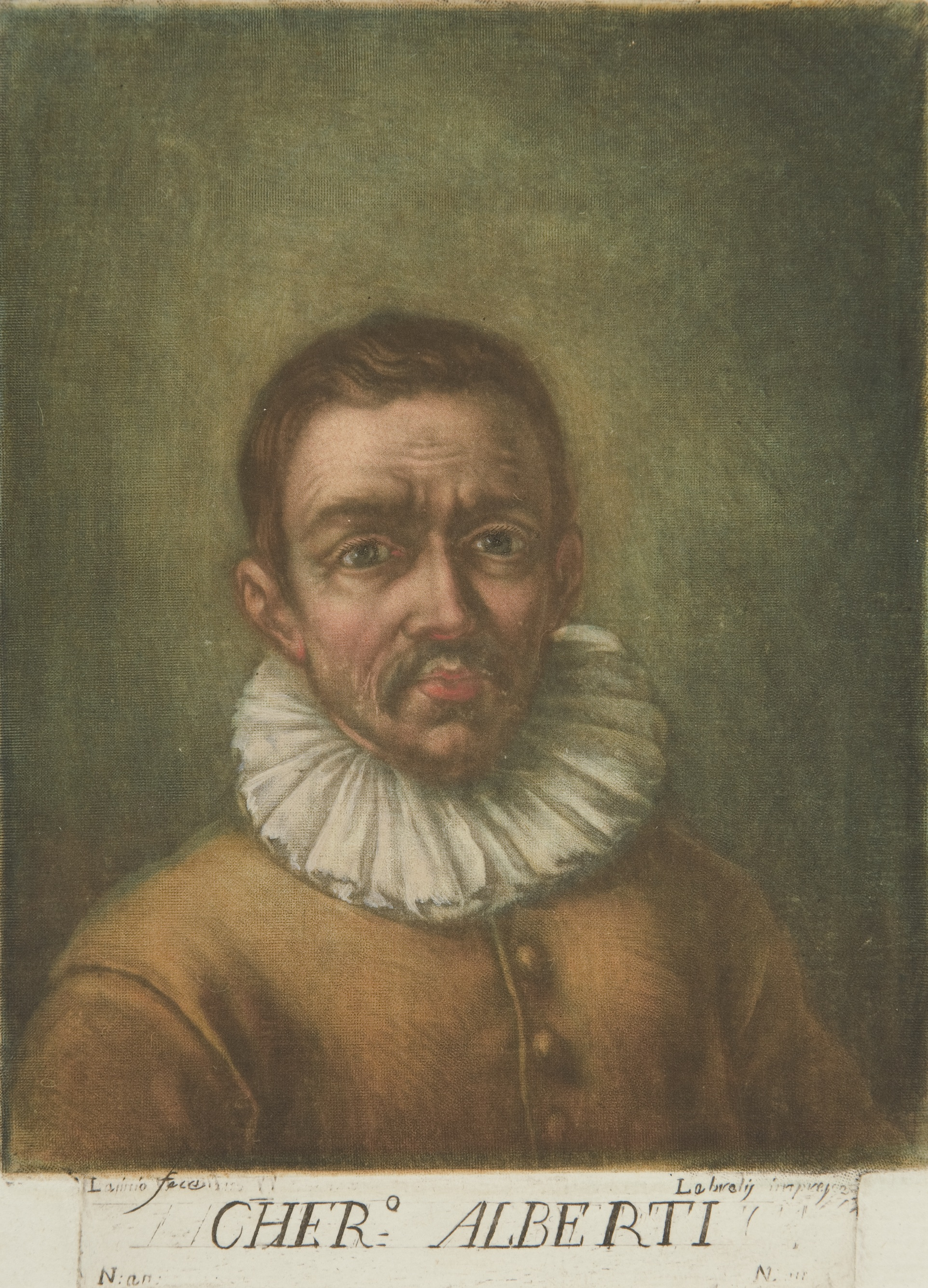
Cherubino Alberti

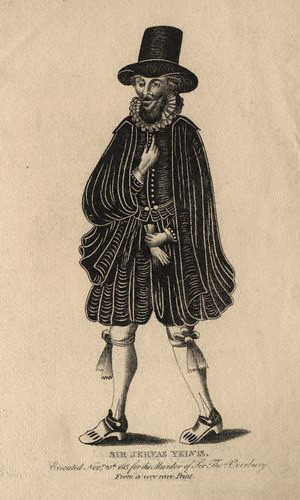
Gervase Helwys

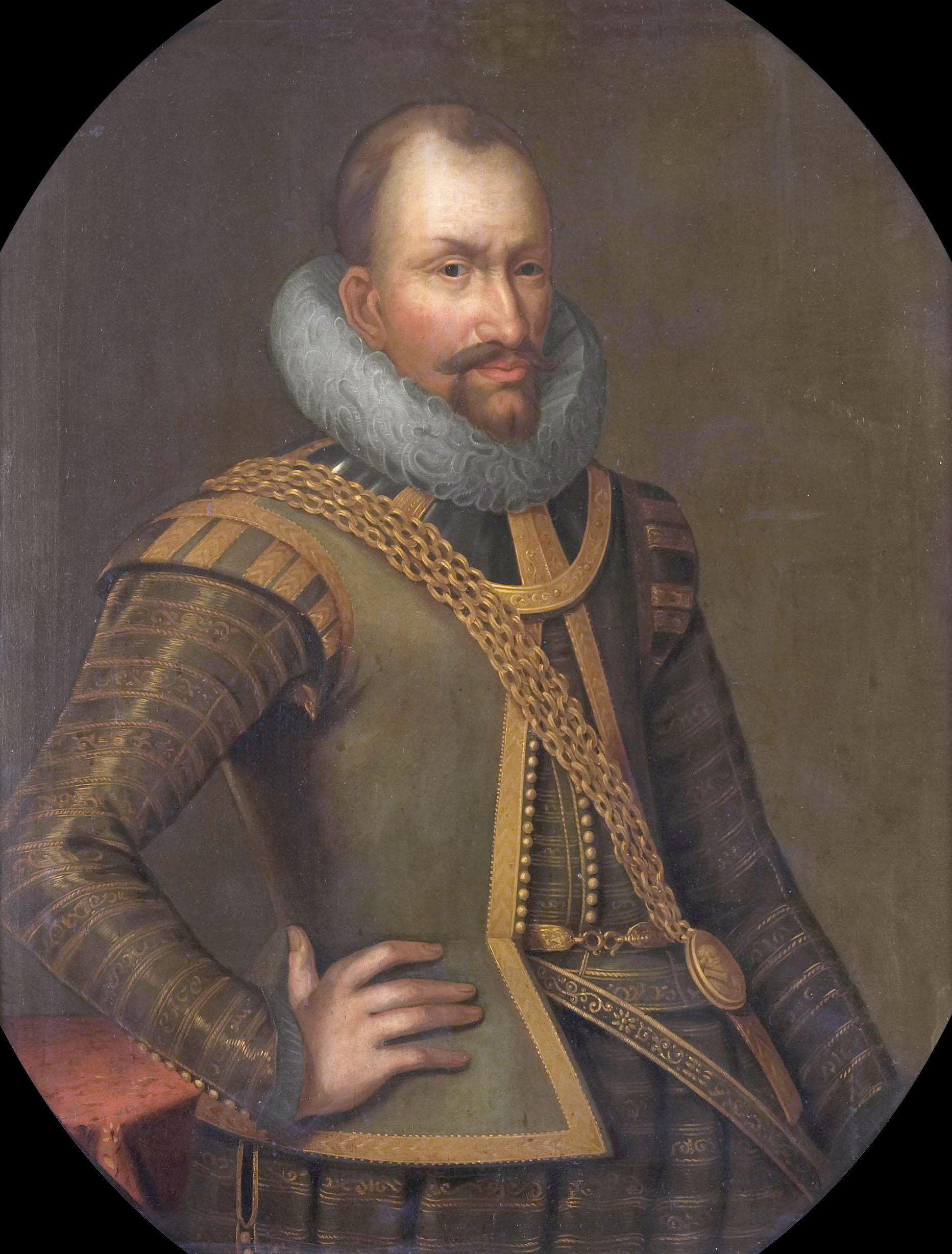
Gerard Reynst

- January 15 – Virginia de' Medici, Italian princess (b. 1568)
- January 16 – Roger Fenton, English clergyman (b. 1565)
- January 31 – Claudio Acquaviva, Italian Jesuit priest, elected (in 1581) the 5th Superior General of the Society of Jesus (b. 1543)
- February 4 – Giambattista della Porta, Italian scholar, polymath, playwright (b. 1535)
- February 3 or February 5 – Dom Justo Takayama, Japanese warlord (b. 1552)
- March 4 – Hans von Aachen, German painter (b. 1552)
- March 6 – Pieter Both, first Governor-General of the Dutch East Indies (b. 1568)
- March 10 – John Ogilvie, Scottish Catholic Jesuit martyr (b. 1579)
- March 19 – Henry Pierrepont, English politician (b. 1546)
- March 27 – Margaret of Valois, Queen of France (b. 1553)
- April 1 – Miklós Istvánffy, Hungarian politician (b. 1538)
- April 12 – William Lower, British astronomer (b. 1570)
- May 4 – Adriaan van Roomen, Flemish mathematician (b. 1561)
- May 5 – Juan Fernandez Pacheco, 5th Duke of Escalona, Spanish noble and diplomat (b. 1563)
- May 9 – John Perrin, English translator (b. 1558)
- May 15
  - Henry Bromley, English politician (b. 1560)
  - William Wilson, English priest (b. 1545)
- May 20 – Dirck van Os, Dutch merchant (b. 1556)
- June 2
  - Kuwana Yoshinari, Japanese samurai (b. 1551)
  - Kimura Shigenari, Japanese samurai (b. 1593)
- June 3
  - Hattori Masanari, Japanese samurai (b. 1565)
  - Sanada Yukimura, Japanese samurai (b. 1567)
- June 4 – Ujiie Yukihiro, Japanese samurai and feudal lord, from the Sengoku period to the beginning of Edo period (b. 1546)
- June 23
  - Roland Lytton, English politician (b. 1561)
  - Mashita Nagamori, minor Japanese daimyō (b. 1545)
- July 26 – Alonso Pérez de Guzmán, 7th Duke of Medina Sidonia (b. 1550)
- July 30 – Evert Horn, Swedish soldier (b. 1585)
- August 7 – Melchior Vulpius, German singer and composer (b. 1570)
- August 23 – Duke François de Joyeuse (b. 1562)
- September 1 – Étienne Pasquier, French lawyer and man of letters (b. 1529)
- September 9 – Virginio Orsini, Duke of Bracciano (b. 1572)
- September 11 – Vitus Miletus, German theologian (b. 1549)
- September 25 – Arbella Stuart, English noblewoman and woman of letters (b. 1575)
- October 9 – Hasan Kafi Pruščak, Bosnian scholar and judge (b. 1544)
- October 16
  - Françoise de Cezelli, French war hero (b. 1558)
  - Ferenc Forgách, Archbishop of Esztergom, Roman Catholic archbishop (b. 1560)
- October 18 – Cherubino Alberti, Italian engraver and painter (b. 1553)
- October 31 – Marcantonio Memmo, Doge of Venice (b. 1536)
- November 6 – Sir Richard Musgrave, 1st Baronet, English politician (b. 1585)
- November 14 – John Leveson, English politician (b. 1555)
- November 15 – Anne Turner, English murderer (b. 1576)
- November 20 – Gervase Helwys, English murderer (b. 1561)
- November 24 – Sethus Calvisius, German calendar reformer (b. 1556)
- November 28 – William Howard, 3rd Baron Howard of Effingham, English politician and Baron (b. 1577)
- November 29 – George Albert II, Margrave of Brandenburg (b. 1591)
- November – Edward Wright, English mathematician and cartographer (b. 1561)
- December 7 – Gerard Reynst, Dutch merchant (b. c. 1558)
- December 26 – August of Saxony, German prince (b. 1589)

1616

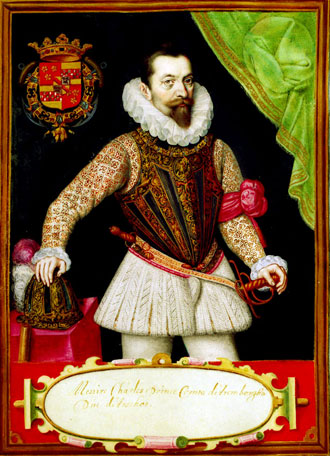
Charles de Ligne

William Shakespeare

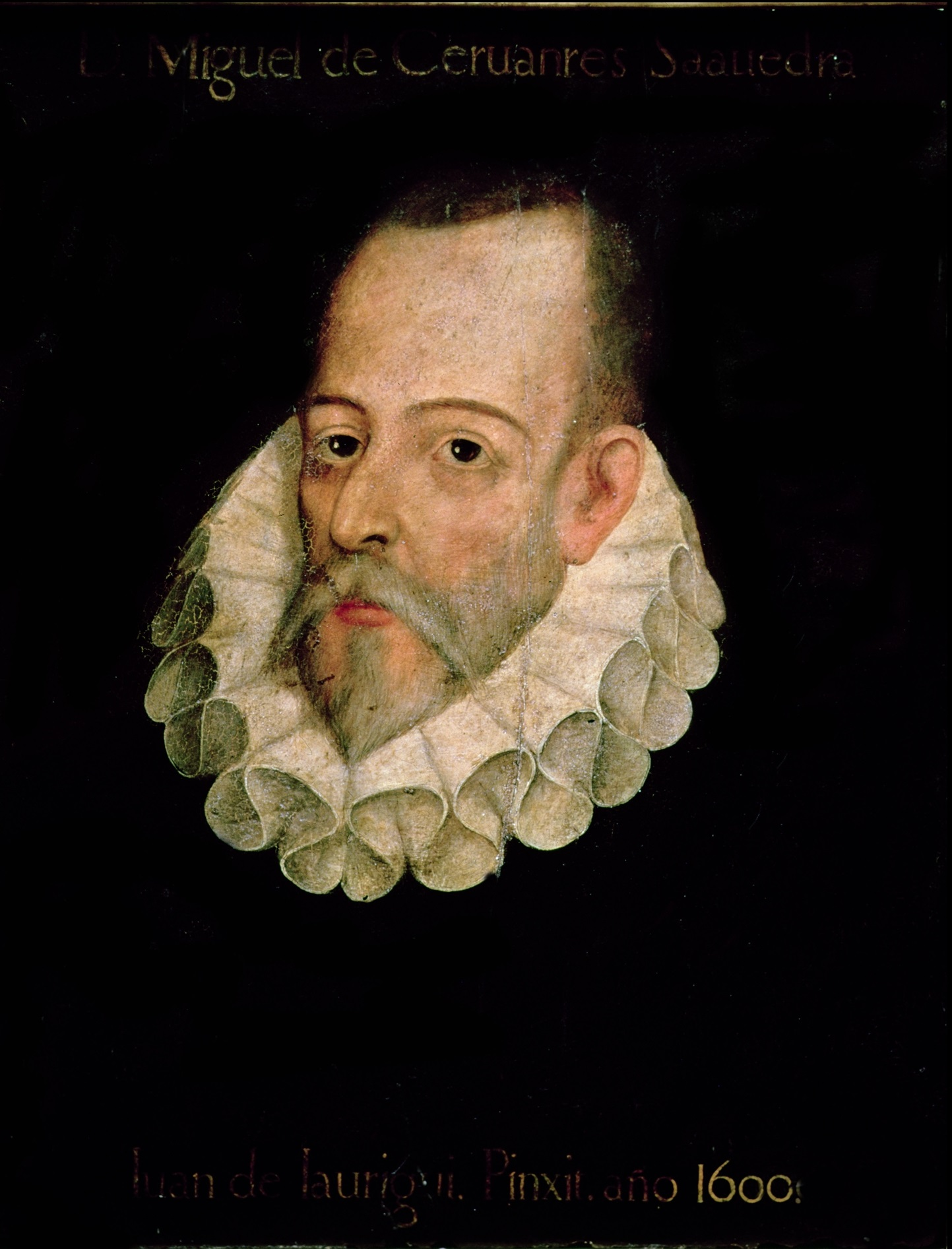
Miguel de Cervantes

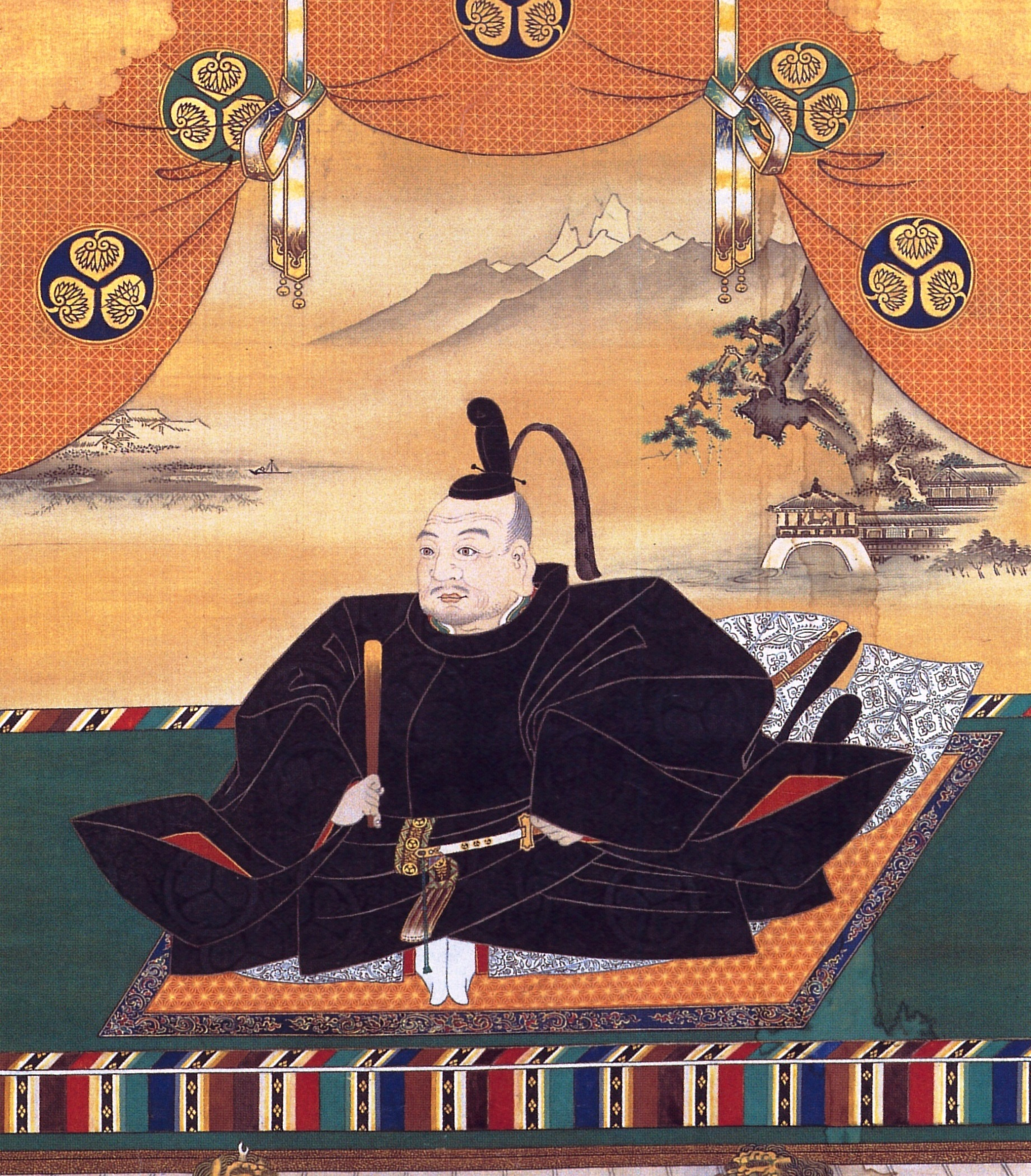
Tokugawa Ieyasu

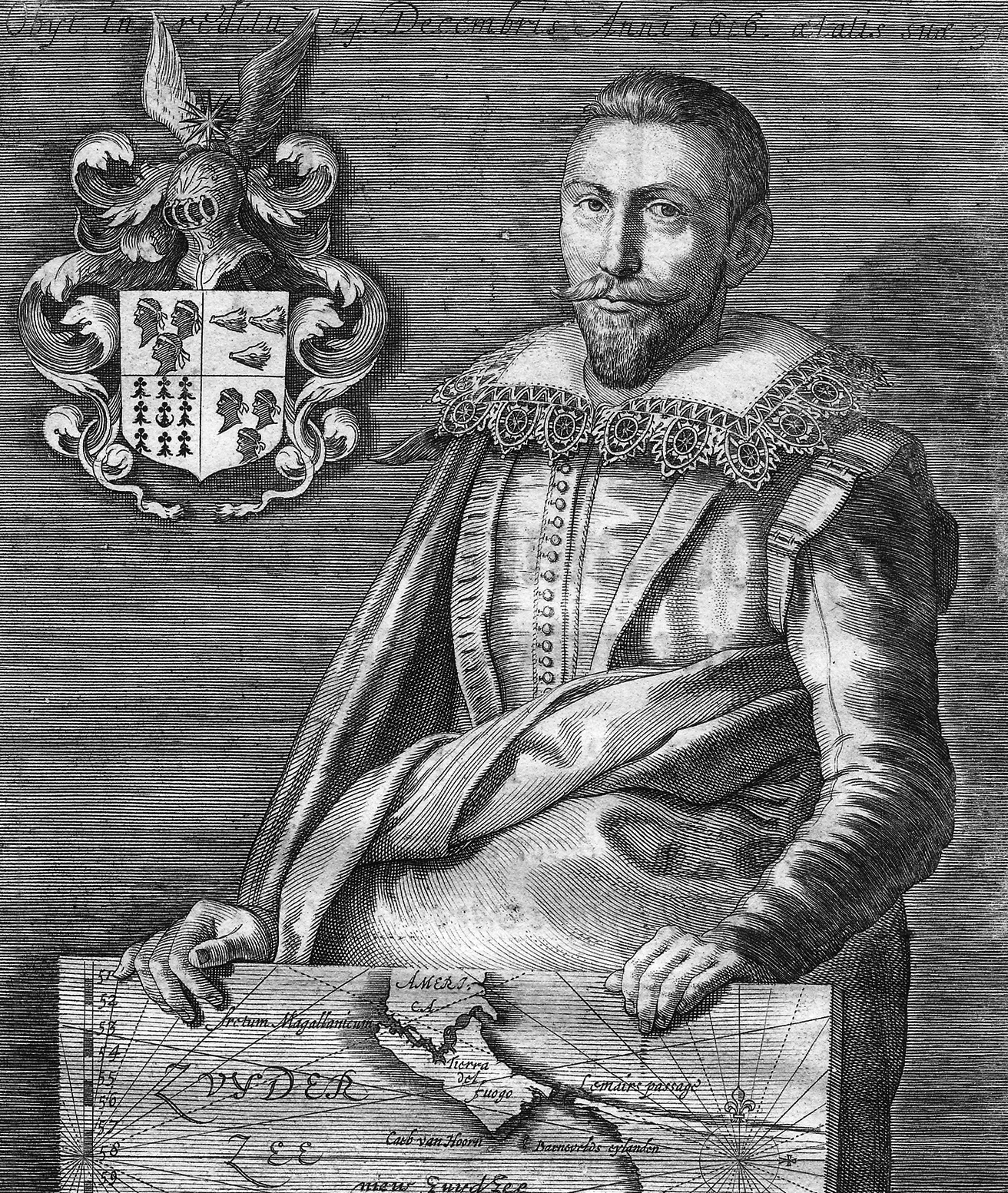
Jacob Le Maire

- January 5 – Simeon Bekbulatovich, khan of the Qasim Tatars, Grand Duke of Muscovy and Tver
- January 6 – Philip Henslowe, English theatre manager (b. 1550)
- January 18 – Charles de Ligne, 2nd Prince of Arenberg, Dutch noble (b. 1550)
- February 12 – Anna of Nassau-Dillenburg, Countess consort of Nassau-Weilburg (b. 1541)
- February 13 – Anders Sørensen Vedel, Danish priest and historian (b. 1542)
- February 15 – George Carey, English politician (b. 1541)
- February 18 – Archduke Maximilian Ernest of Austria, Austrian archduke (b. 1583)
- February 28
  - Mikołaj Krzysztof "the Orphan" Radziwiłł, Polish-Lithuanian noble (szlachcic) (b. 1549)
  - Vincent Skinner, English Member of Parliament (b. 1543)
- March 3 – Matthias de l'Obel, physician of James I of England (b. 1538)
- March 6 – Francis Beaumont, dramatist in the English Renaissance theatre (b. 1584)
- March 8
  - Maria Anna of Bavaria, daughter of William V, Duke of Bavaria and Renata von Lothringen (b. 1574)
  - Giulio Cesare Casseri, Italian anatomist (b. 1552)
- March 19 – Johannes Fabricius, Frisian/German astronomer (b. 1587)
- March 21 – Giacomo Castelvetro, Italian writer (b. 1546)
- March 27 – George Wylde I, English lawyer and politician (b. 1550)
- March 31 – John Adolf, Duke of Holstein-Gottorp (b. 1575)
- April 19 – Juan de Silva, Spanish military commander and governor of the Philippines
- April 22 – Miguel de Cervantes, Spanish author (b. 1547)
- April 23
  - (O.S., Tuesday) – William Shakespeare, English playwright and poet (b. 1564)
  - (Inca date unknown) Inca Garcilaso de la Vega, Peruvian author (b. 1539)
- April 27 – Francesco Barbaro, Italian diplomat (b. 1546)
- May 4 – Magdalene of Brandenburg, Landgravine consort of Hesse-Darmstadt (1598–1616) (b. 1582)
- May 8 – Gilbert Talbot, 7th Earl of Shrewsbury, English politician and earl (b. 1552)
- May 24 – Margaret Clifford, Countess of Cumberland, British noble (b. 1560)
- May 30 – Thomas Parry, English politician (b. 1541)
- June 1 – Tokugawa Ieyasu, Japanese shōgun (b. 1543)
- June 4 – Adam Hieronim Sieniawski, Polish–Lithuanian noble (b. c. 1576)
- June 9 – Cornelis Schuyt, Dutch organist and composer (b. 1557)
- June 18 – Thomas Bilson, English bishop (b. 1547)
- June 19 – Henry Robinson, English bishop (b. 1553)
- July 2 – Bernardino Realino, Italian Jesuit (b. 1530)
- July 7
  - Charles Philippe de Rodoan, third bishop of Middelburg and the fourth bishop of Bruges (b. 1552)
  - Anna of Württemberg, German princess (b. 1561)
- July 20
  - Honda Masanobu, Japanese commander and daimyō (b. 1538)
  - Hugh O'Neill, 2nd Earl of Tyrone, Irish soldier (b. 1540)
- July 25 – Andreas Libavius, German physician and chemist (b. 1555)
- July 29 – Tang Xianzu, Chinese playwright and poet (b. 1550)
- July 31 – Roger Wilbraham, Solicitor-General for Ireland (b. 1553)
- August 3 – Hans Meinhard von Schönberg, German military commander (b. 1582)
- August 7
  - Scipione Gentili, Italian law professor and legal writer (b. 1563)
  - Vincenzo Scamozzi, Italian architect (b. 1548)
- August 8
  - Cornelis Ketel, Dutch painter (b. 1548)
  - Henry Lennard, 12th Baron Dacre, English baron and politician (b. 1570)
- August 31 – Henry Poole, English politician (b. 1541)
- September 24
  - Henry Baynton, English Member of Parliament (b. 1571)
  - John Scott, English politician (b. 1570)
- September 29 – Henry Clinton, 2nd Earl of Lincoln, English politician (b. 1539)
- October 10 – Countess Maria of Nassau (b. 1556)
- October 11 – Aleksander Józef Lisowski, Polish noble (szlachcic) (b. 1580)
- October 17 – John Pitts, Catholic scholar and writer (b. 1560)
- October 21 – Sakazaki Naomori, Japanese daimyō (b. 1563)
- October 23 – Leonhard Hutter, German theologian (b. 1563)
- October 27 – Johannes Praetorius, German astronomer and mathematician (b. 1537)
- November 3 – Agnes Hedwig of Anhalt, Abbess of Gernrode, Electress of Saxony, Duchess of Schleswig-Holstein-Sønderborg-Plön (b. 1573)
- November 8 – Robert Dormer, 1st Baron Dormer, English politician (b. 1551)
- November 14 – William Harris, English knight (b. 1556)
- November 20 – Matsumae Yoshihiro, Japanese daimyo of Ezochi (Hokkaidō) (b. 1548)
- December 6 – Ahmad Ibn al-Qadi, Moroccan writer, judge and mathematician (b. 1552)
- November 23 – Richard Hakluyt, English author, editor and translator (b. 1553)
- December 7 – Guillaume Fouquet de la Varenne, French chef (b. 1560)
- December 22 – Jacob Le Maire, Dutch mariner (b. 1585)
- December 24 – György Thurzó, Palatine of Hungary (b. 1567)
- December 31 – Jan Szczęsny Herburt, Polish political writer (b. 1567)
- Shimozuma Chūkō, Japanese monk of the Hongan-ji (b. 1551)
- Meir Lublin, Polish rabbi (b. 1558)
- Hendrick Christiaensen, Dutch explorer
- Krzysztof Klabon, Polish Renaissance composer (b. 1550)
- Alexander Whitaker, Virginia Colony religious leader (b. 1585)

1617

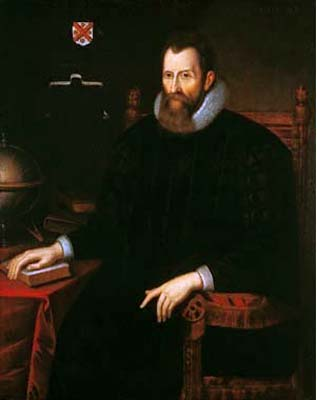
John Napier

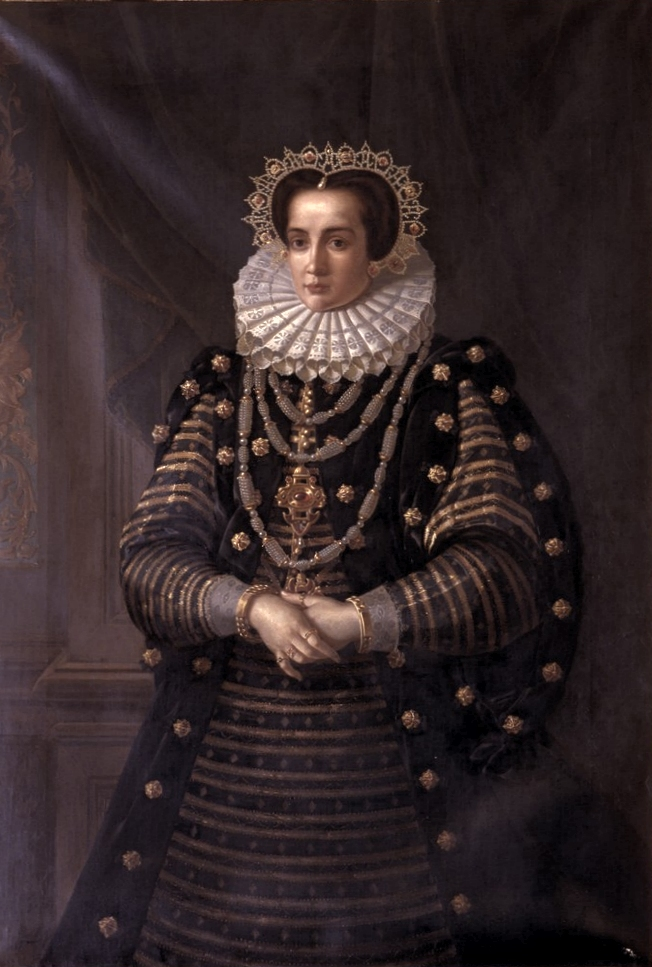
Dorothea Maria of Anhalt

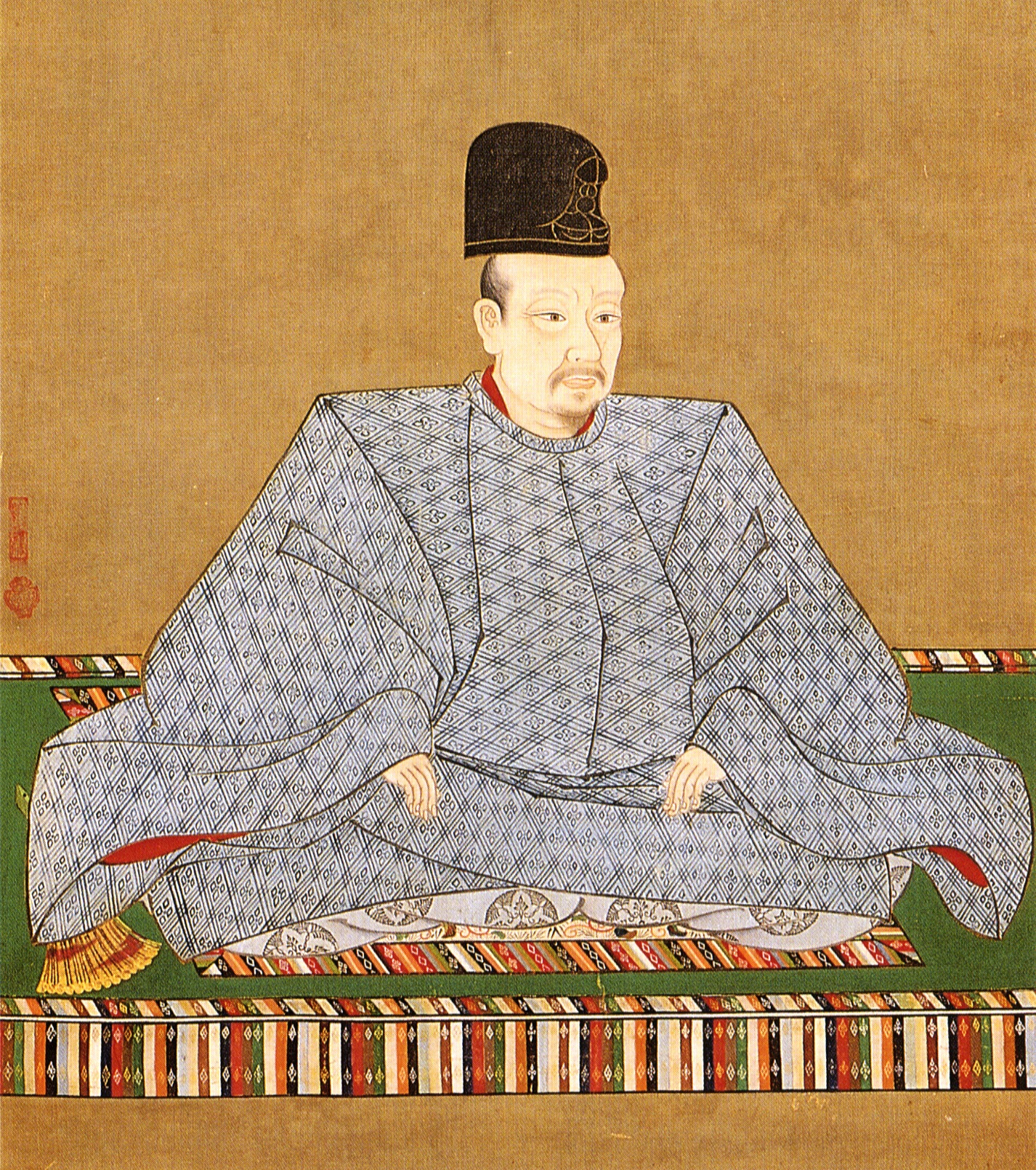
Emperor Go-Yozei

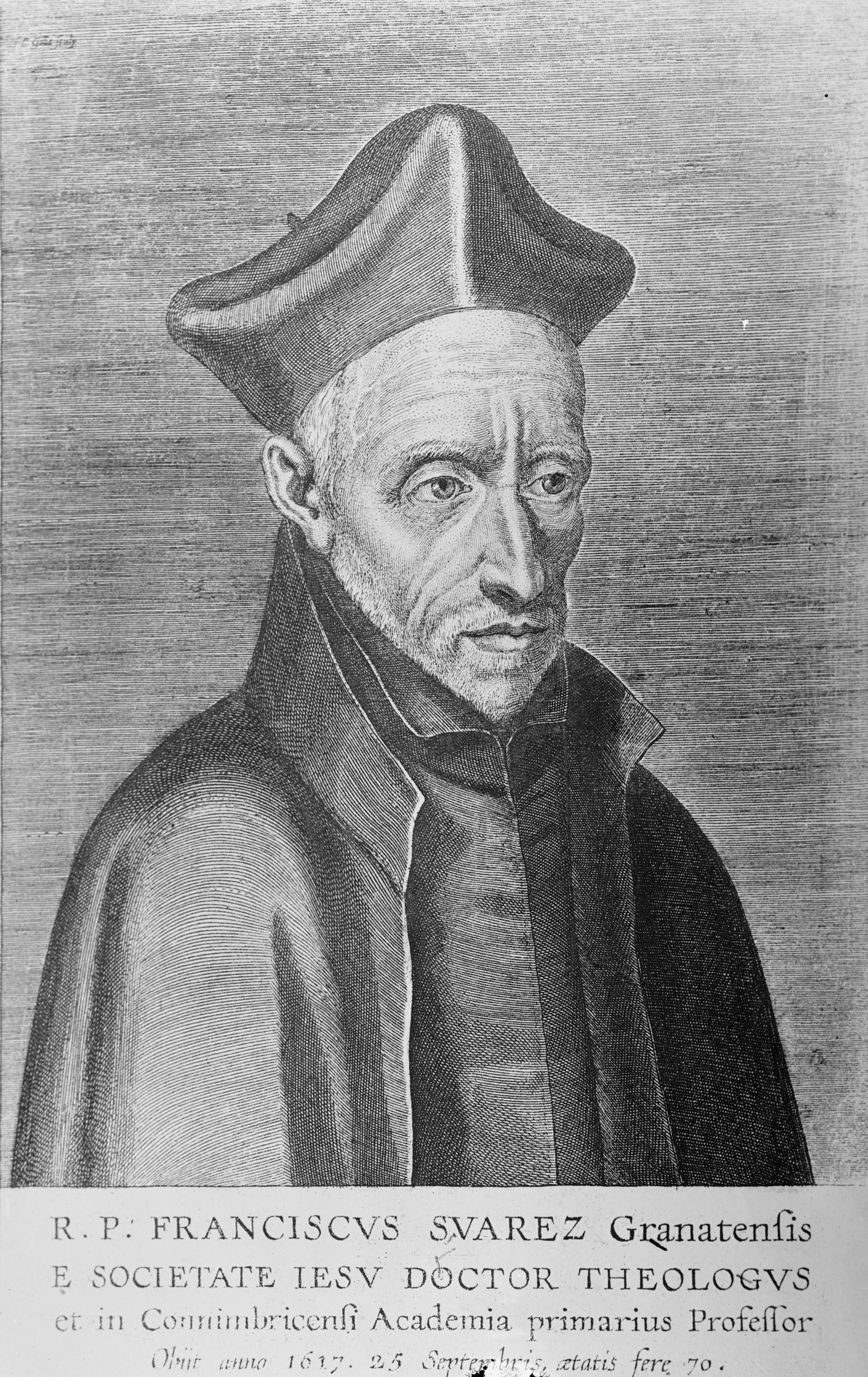
Saint Francisco Suarez

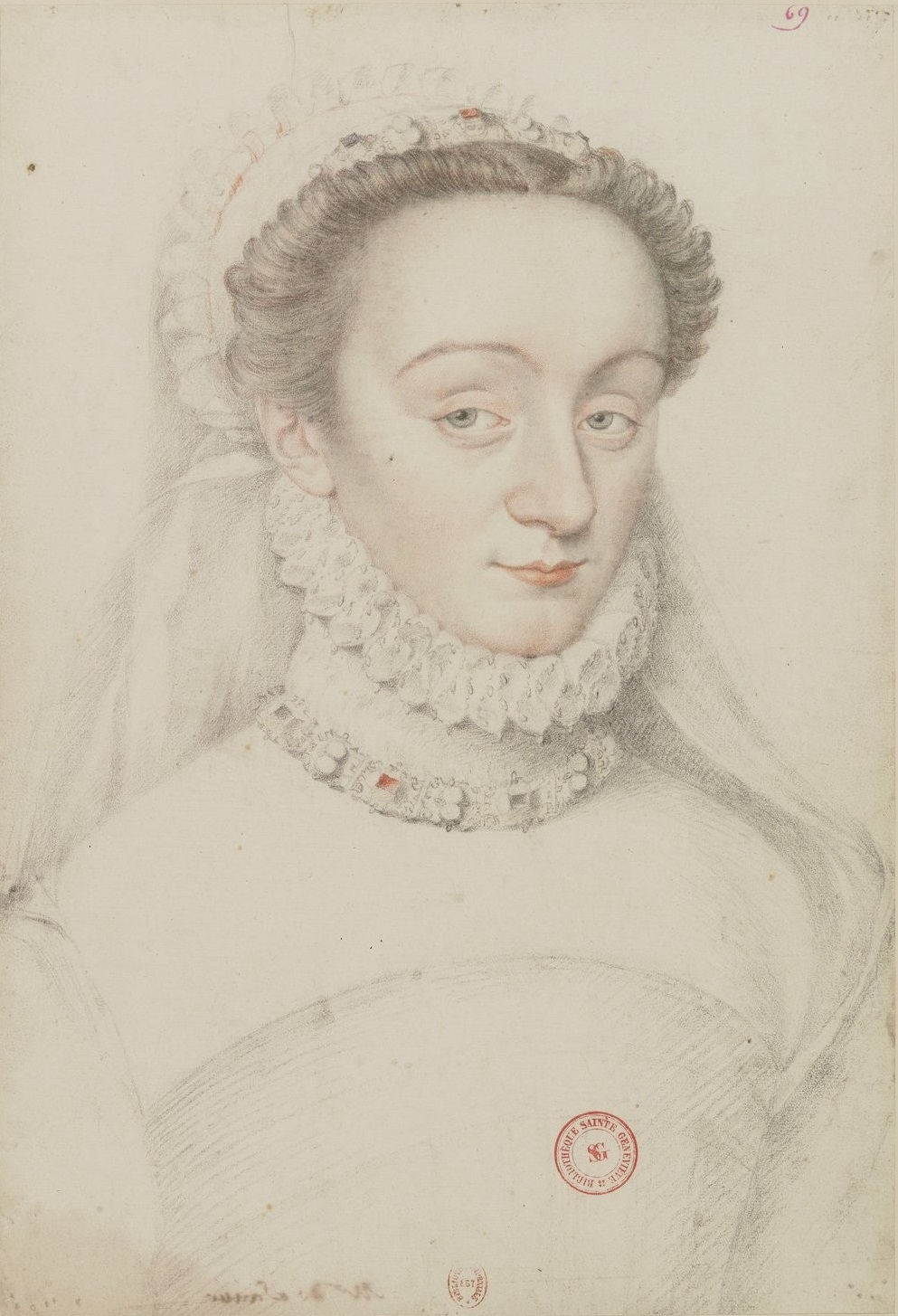
Charlotte de Sauve

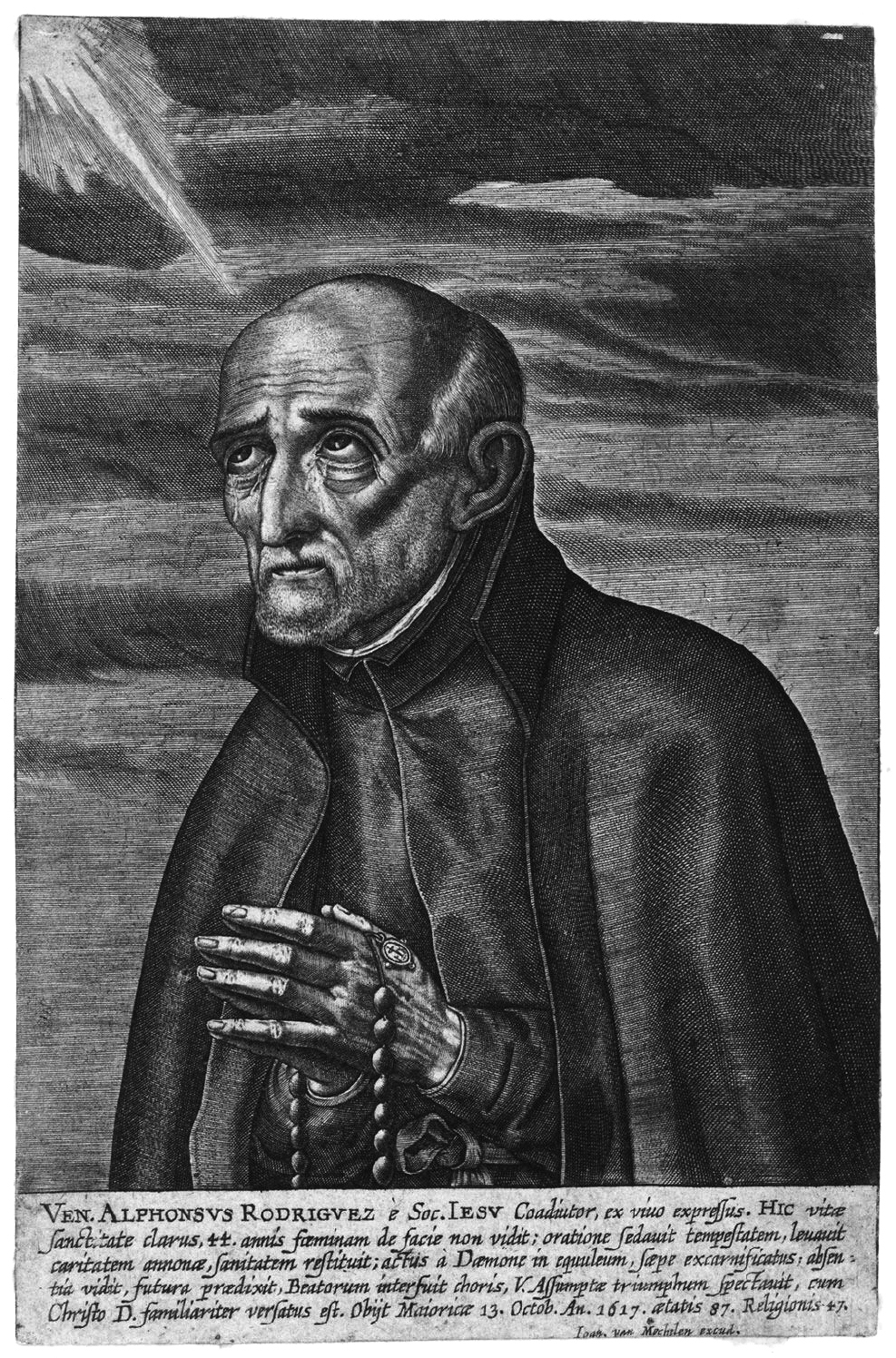
Alphonsus Rodriguez

- January 1 – Hendrik Goltzius, Dutch painter (b. 1558)
- January 6 – Dorothea of Denmark, Duchess of Brunswick-Lüneburg from 1561 to 1592 as the consort of Duke William (b. 1546)
- January 16 – Wolf Dietrich Raitenau, Prince-Archbishop of Salzburg (b. 1559)
- January 17 – Faust Vrančić, Croatian inventor (b. 1551)
- January 28 – Karl II, Duke of Münsterberg-Oels, Duke of Oels and Duke of Bernstadt (b. 1545)
- February 3 – Prospero Alpini, Italian physician and botanist from the Republic of Venice (b. 1553)
- February 8 – Edward Talbot, 8th Earl of Shrewsbury, English politician and earl (b. 1561)
- February 11 – Giovanni Antonio Magini, Italian mathematician, cartographer and astronomer (b. 1555)
- February 16 – Kaspar Ulenberg, German theologian (b. 1549)
- March 1 – Edward Hoby, English politician (b. 1560)
- March 20 – François d'Aguilon, Belgian Jesuit mathematician (b. 1567)
- March 21 – Pocahontas, Algonquian (Native American) princess (b. c. 1596)
- March 27 – George II, Duke of Pomerania, non-reigning Duke of Pomerania (b. 1582)
- April 1 – Ralph Eure, 3rd Baron Eure, English politician (b. 1558)
- April 4 – John Napier, Scottish mathematician (b. 1550)
- April 5 – Alonso Lobo, Spanish composer (b. 1555)
- May 3 – Aleixo de Menezes, Portuguese Catholic archbishop (b. 1559)
- May 7
  - David Fabricius, Frisian astronomer (b. 1564)
  - Jacques Auguste de Thou, French historian (b. 1553)
- May 11 – Jean Chapeauville, Belgian theologian and historian (b. 1551)
- May 16 – Nicolas de Montmorency (b. 1556)
- May 29 – Roger Owen, English politician (b. 1573)
- June 20 – Raja Wodeyar I, King of Mysore (b. 1552)
- June 27 – Jerome Xavier, Spanish Jesuit missionary (b. 1549)
- July 8 – Leonora Dori, French noble (b. 1571)
- July 9 – John Herbert, Welsh politician (b. 1550)
- July 13 – Adam Wenceslaus, Duke of Cieszyn, Duke of Teschen (b. 1574)
- July 18 – Dorothea Maria of Anhalt (b. 1570)
- August 7 – Otto, Landgrave of Hesse-Kassel, Hereditary Prince of Hesse-Kassel, Administrator of Hersfeld Abbey (b. 1594)
- August 8 – Frederick IV of Fürstenberg, German noble (b. 1563)
- August 13 – Johann Jakob Grynaeus, Swiss Protestant clergyman (b. 1540)
- August 24 – Rose of Lima, Peruvian saint (b. 1586)
- August 28 – William Willoughby, 3rd Baron Willoughby of Parham, English baron (b. 1584)
- September 9 – Julius Echter von Mespelbrunn, German bishop (b. 1545)
- September 25
  - Emperor Go-Yōzei of Japan (b. 1571)
  - Francisco Suárez, Spanish Jesuit priest (b. 1548)
- September 27 – John Ernest of Nassau-Siegen, German general (b. 1582)
- September 30 – Charlotte de Sauve, French courtesan (b. 1551)
- October 10 – Bernardino Baldi, Italian mathematician and writer (b. 1553)
- October 11 – François Vranck, Dutch statesman and justice (b. 1555)
- October 14 – Isaac Arnauld, French noble (b. 1566)
- October 19 – David Hoeschel, German librarian (b. 1556)
- October 22 – Matthias Hafenreffer, German Lutheran theologian (b. 1561)
- October 27 – Ralph Winwood, English politician (b. c. 1563)
- October 31 – Alphonsus Rodriguez, Spanish Jesuit lay brother, saint (b. 1532)
- November 10 – Barnabe Rich, English soldier and writer (b. c. 1540)
- November 12 – Nicolas de Neufville, seigneur de Villeroy, secretary of state under four kings of France (b. 1543)
- November 17 – Princess Dorothea, Abbess of Quedlinburg (b. 1591)
- November 22 – Ahmed I, Ottoman Emperor (b. 1590)
- Tarquinia Molza, Italian singer (b. 1542)

1618

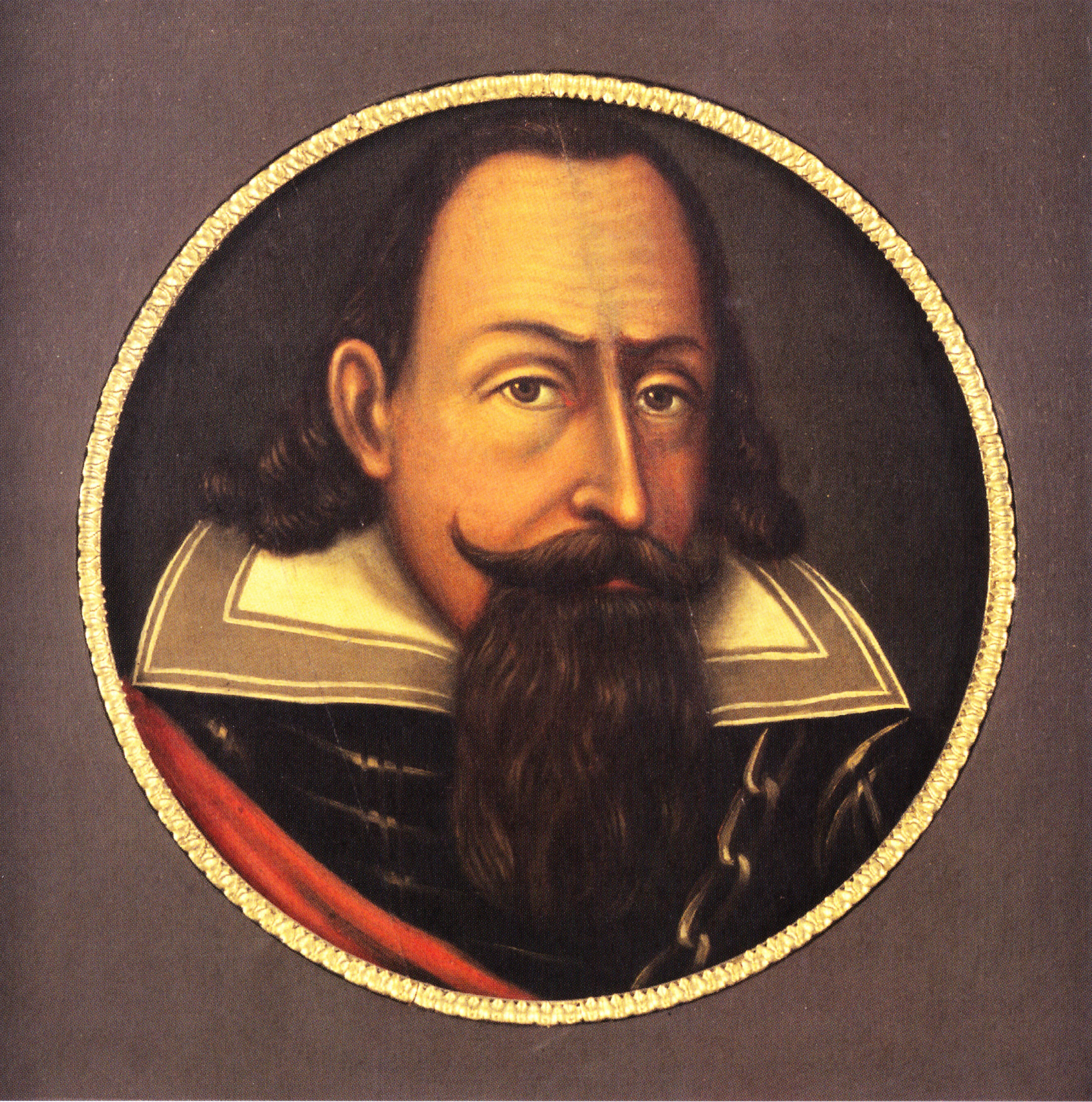
Philip II, Duke of Pomerania

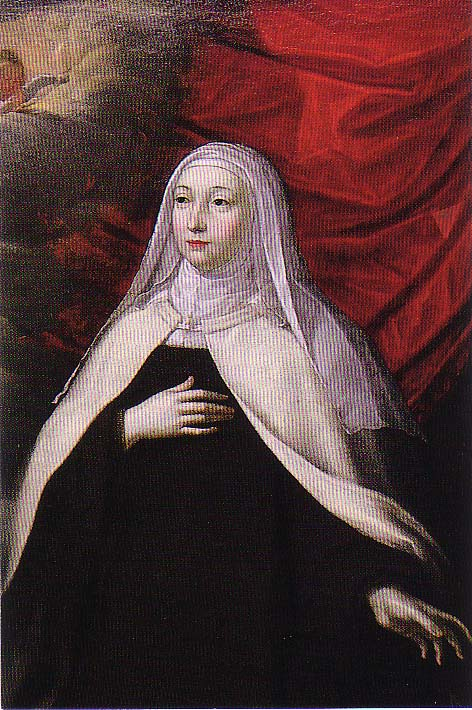
Marie of the Incarnation (Carmelite)

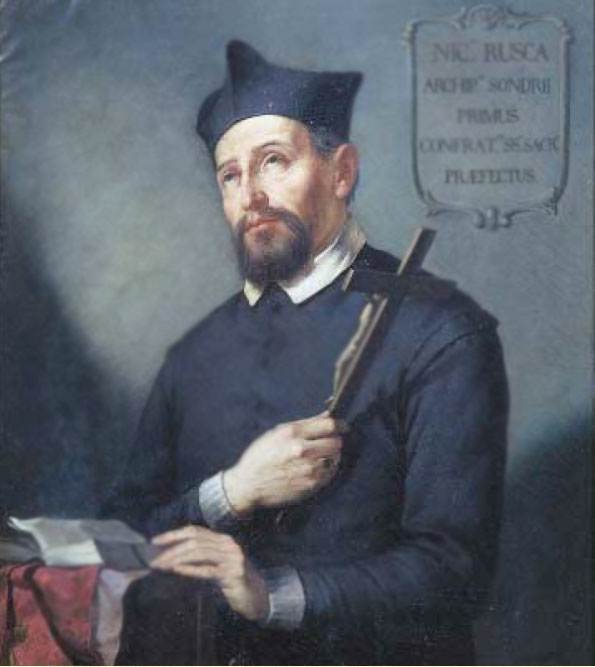
Nicolò Rusca

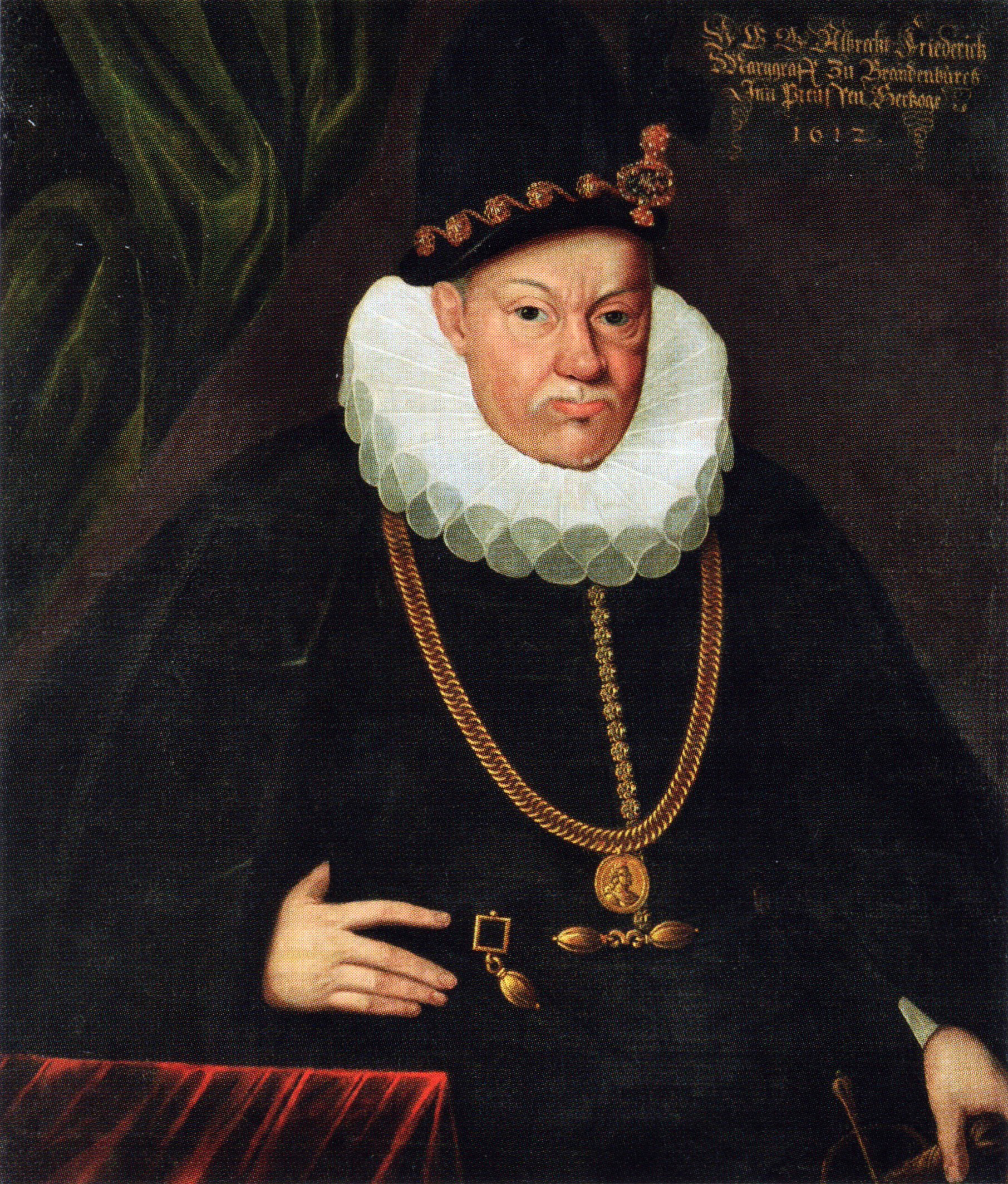
Albert Frederick, Duke of Prussia

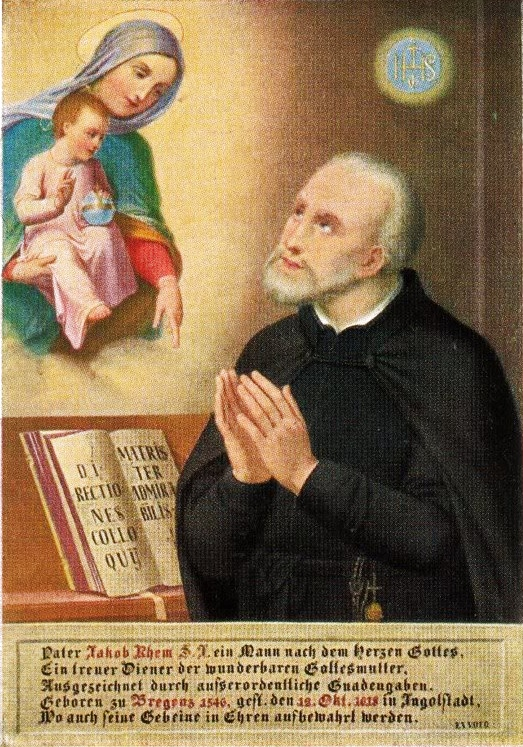
Jakob Rem

- January 6 – Margherita Gonzaga, Duchess of Ferrara (b. 1564)
- January 19 – Jacobus Zaffius, Dutch Catholic provost (b. 1535)
- January 24 – Henry Brooke, 11th Baron Cobham, English peer and traitor (b. 1564)
- January 29 – John Dackombe, Chancellor of the Duchy of Lancaster (b. 1570)
- February 3 – Philip II, Duke of Pomerania-Stettin (b. 1573)
- February 10 – Feliks Kryski, Grand Chancellor of Poland (b. 1562)
- February 14 – Paolo Emilio Sfondrati, Italian Catholic cardinal (b. 1560)
- February 20 – Philip William, Prince of Orange, eldest son of William the Silent, by his first wife Anna van Egmont (b. 1554)
- February 25 – Elizabeth Spencer, Baroness Hunsdon, English baroness (b. 1552)
- February 27 – Anne Lyon, Countess of Kinghorne, Scottish countess (b. 1579)
- March 5
  - John, Duke of Östergötland (b. 1589)
  - Countess Palatine Barbara of Zweibrücken-Neuburg and by marriage Countess of Oettingen-Oettingen (b. 1559)
- March 16 – Giovanni Bembo, Doge of Venice (b. 1543)
- March 23 – James Hamilton, 1st Earl of Abercorn, Scottish politician (b. c. 1575)
- March 26 – Frederick Magnus, Count of Erbach-Fürstenau (1606–1618) (b. 1575)
- March 31 – Pedro Cornejo de Pedrosa, Spanish theologian (b. 1536)
- April – Chief Powhatan (proper name Wahunsenacawh), Algonquin (indigenous American) leader, father of Pocahontas (b. c. 1547)
- April 5 – Robert Barker, English politician (b. 1563)
- April 14 – Giovanni Battista Zuccato, Italian Catholic prelate, Bishop of Nusco (1607–1614) (b. 1543)
- April 18 – Marie of the Incarnation, Carmelite (b. 1566)
- May 9 – Nicolò Donato, Doge of Venice (b. 1539)
- May 24 – John George I, Prince of Anhalt-Dessau (1603–1618) (b. 1567)
- May 31 – Sabina Catharina of East Frisia, Countess of Rietberg (1586–1618) (b. 1582)
- June 7 – Thomas West, 3rd Baron De La Warr, English Governor of Virginia (b. 1577)
- June 21 – Kasper Hassler, German musician (b. 1562)
- July 20 – James Montague, British bishop (b. 1568)
- July 24 – Nicolò Rusca, Italian priest who served in Como (b. 1563)
- July 26 – Martinus Smiglecius, Polish philosopher (b. 1564)
- August 7 – Princess Maria Elizabeth of Sweden, Swedish princess (b. 1596)
- August 23 – Gerbrand Adriaenszoon Bredero, Dutch writer (b. 1585)
- August 28 – Albert Frederick, Duke of Prussia (b. 1553)
- September 3 – Frederik van den Bergh, Dutch soldier in the Eighty Years' War (b. 1559)
- September 28 – Joshua Sylvester, English poet (b. 1563)

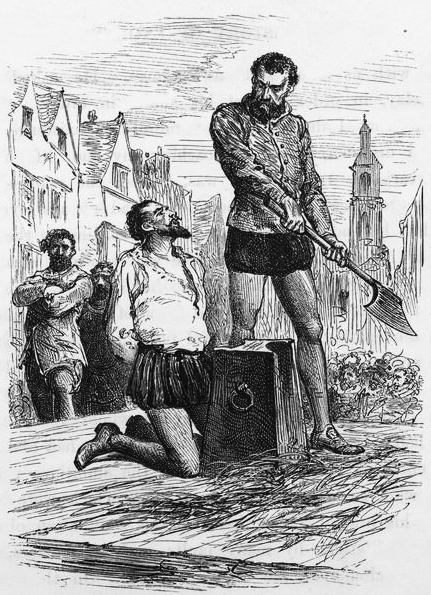
Sir Walter Raleigh

- October 12 – Jakob Rem, Austrian Jesuit (b. 1546)
- October 24 – Elisabeth of Brunswick-Wolfenbüttel, German noblewoman (b. 1567)
- October 29 – Sir Walter Raleigh, English soldier, politician, courtier, explorer, Virginia settler, historian, poet and spy (executed) (b. 1552 of 1554)
- October 30
  - Charles, Margrave of Burgau, German nobleman (b. 1560)
  - Prospero Farinacci, Italian jurist (b. 1554)
- November 2 – Maximilian III, Archduke of Austria (b. 1558)
- November 14 – Anna Maria of Brandenburg, Duchess Consort of Pomerania (b. 1567)
- December 6 – Jacques Davy Duperron, French cardinal (b. 1556)
- December 7 – Bernardo de Sandoval y Rojas, Spanish Catholic cardinal, Grand Inquisitor (b. 1546)
- December 9 – Valentine Knightley, English politician (b. 1555)
- December 10 – Giulio Caccini, Italian composer (b. 1551)
- December 14 – Anna of Tyrol, Holy Roman Empress (b. 1585)
- December 17 – Roger Puleston, Welsh politician (b. 1565)
- Ebba Bielke, Swedish baroness and conspirator (b. 1570)
- Christina Rauscher, German official and critic of witchcraft persecutions (b. 1570)

1619

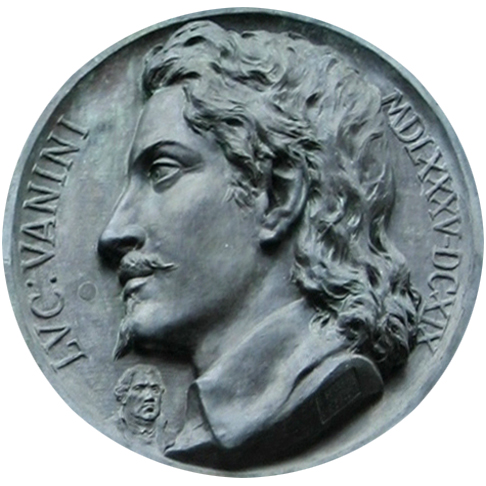
Lucilio Vanini

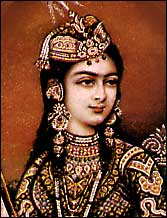
Taj Bibi Bilqis Makani

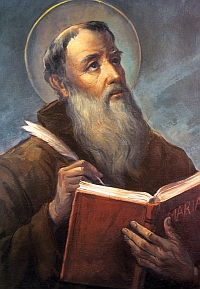
Lawrence of Brindisi

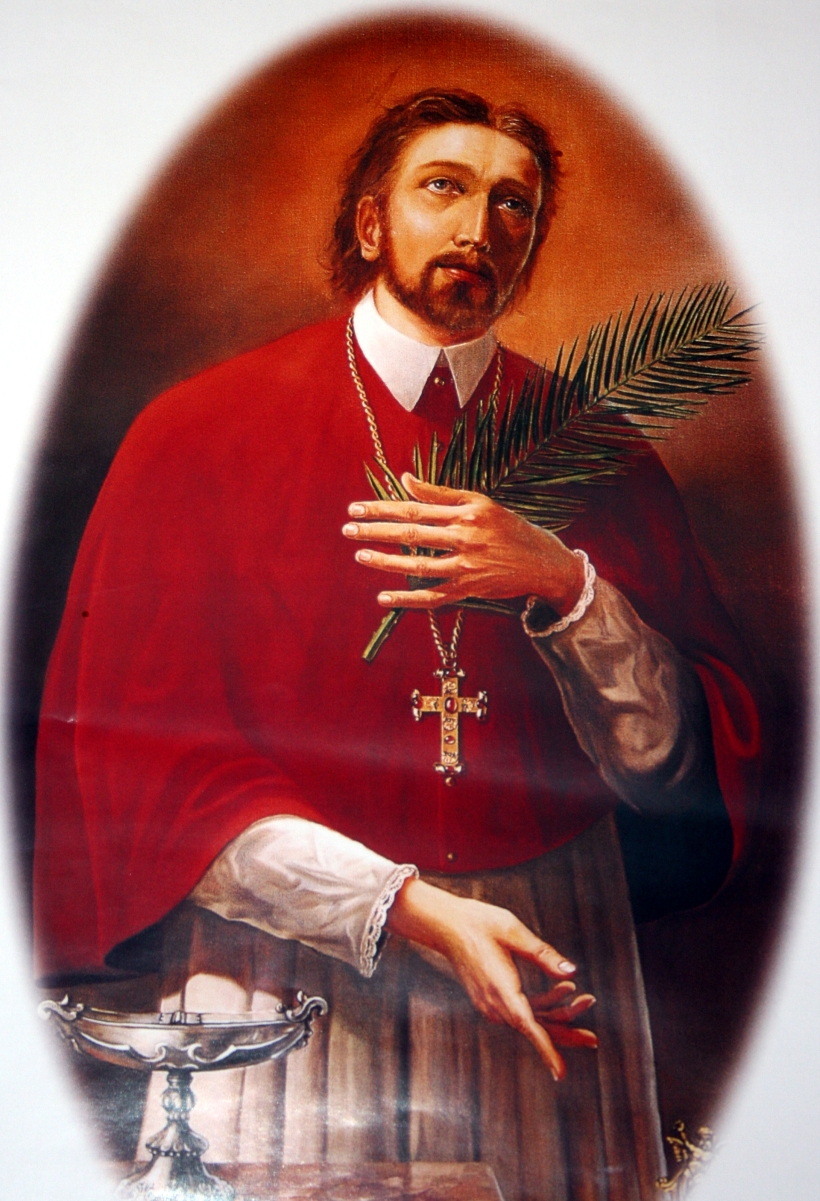
Marko Krizin

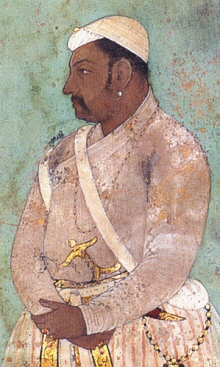
Sur Singh

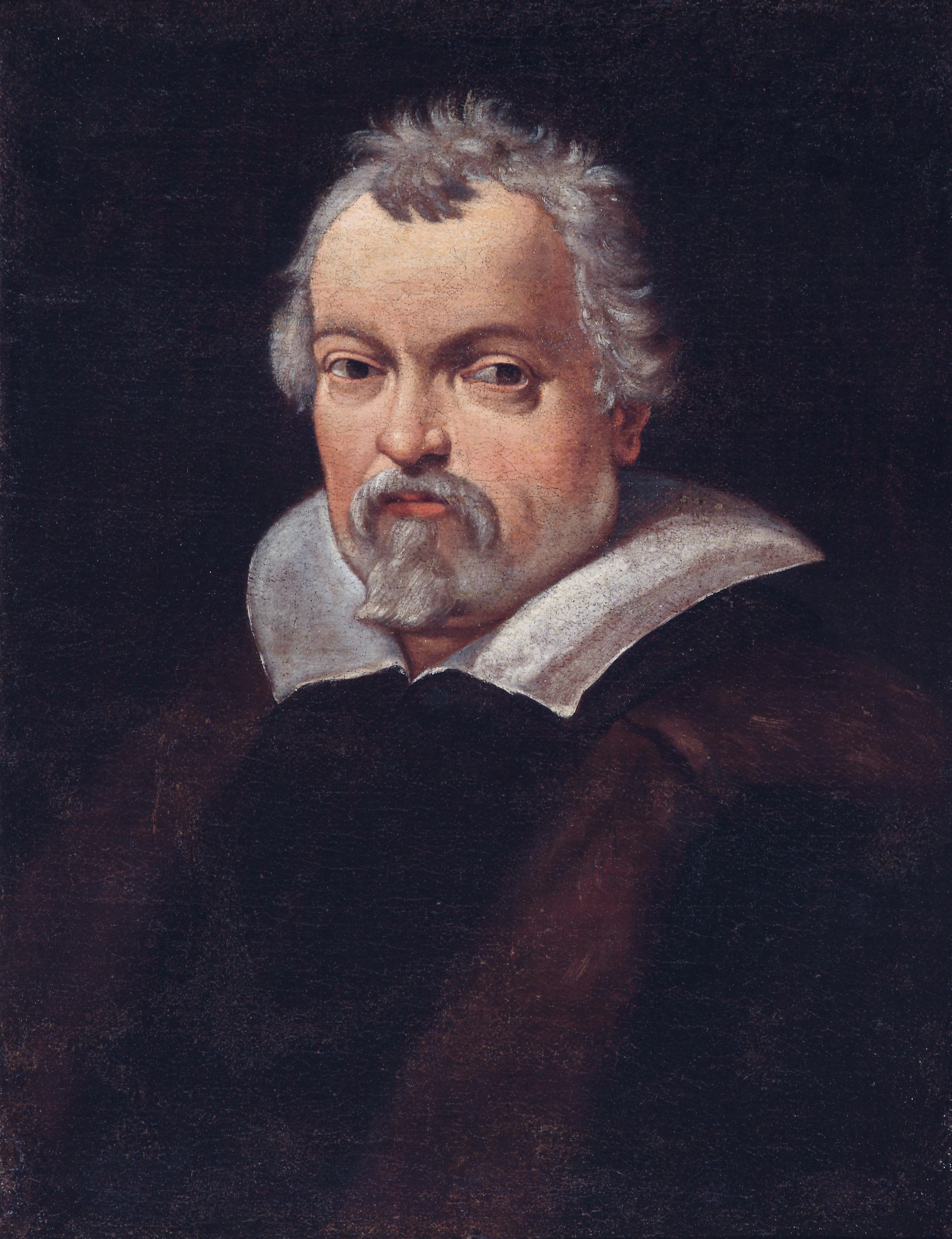
Ludovico Carracci

- January 7 – Nicholas Hilliard, English miniature painter (b. c. 1547)
- January 11 – Diane de France, Duchess of Angoulême (b. 1538)
- January 15 – Thomas Clinton, 3rd Earl of Lincoln, English politician (b. 1568)
- January 20 – Éléonore de Bourbon, Dutch princess (b. 1587)
- February 3 – Henry Brooke, 11th Baron Cobham, English conspirator (b. 1564)
- February 9 – Lucilio Vanini, Italian philosopher (b. 1585)
- February 12 – Pierre de Larivey, Italian-born French dramatist (b. 1549)
- February 16 – William Couper, Scottish bishop of Galloway (b. 1568)
- March 2
  - William Cooke, English politician (b. 1572)
  - Anne of Denmark, Queen of James I of England (b. 1574)
- March 5 – Demeter Naprágyi, Hungarian Catholic archbishop (b. 1564)
- March 13 – Richard Burbage, English actor (b. c. 1567)
- March 15
  - Michael Balfour, 1st Lord Balfour of Burleigh, Scottish nobleman
  - Orsolya Dersffy, Hungarian noble (b. 1583)
- March 18 – Chō Tsuratatsu, Japanese samurai (b. 1546)
- March 20
  - Ippolito Galantini, founder of the Congregation of Christian Doctrine of Florence (b. 1565)
  - Matthias, Holy Roman Emperor, Austrian Habsburg ruler (b. 1557)
- April 5 – Alexander Home, 1st Earl of Home, Scottish nobleman (b. 1566)
- April 10 – Thomas Jones, Anglican Archbishop of Dublin (b. c. 1550)
- April 16 – Denis Calvaert, Flemish painter (b. 1540)
- April 18 – Taj Bibi Bilqis Makani, Mughal empress (b. 1573)
- April/May – William Larkin, English court portrait painter (b. early 1580s)
- May – John Overall, English bishop (b. 1559)
- May 13 – Johan van Oldenbarnevelt, Dutch statesman (b. 1547)
- May 21 – Hieronymus Fabricius, Italian anatomist (b. 1537)
- May 23 – Stephen Soame, Lord Mayor of London (b. 1540)
- June 18 – Martin Fréminet, French painter (b. 1567)
- July 2 – Francis II, Duke of Saxe-Lauenburg (1586–1619) (b. 1547)
- July 22 – Lawrence of Brindisi, Italian saint (b. 1559)
- July 24 – Nabeshima Naoshige, Japanese samurai (b. 1537)
- August 3 – Dorothy Percy, Countess of Northumberland, younger daughter of Walter Devereux (b. c. 1564)
- August 19
  - Thomas Dale, English colonial governor (b. 1570)
  - Jørgen Lunge, Danish politician (b. 1577)
- August 29 – Ferdinando Taverna, Italian Catholic cardinal (b. 1558)
- August 30 – Shimazu Yoshihiro, Japanese samurai and warlord (b. 1535)
- September – Hans Lippershey, Dutch lensmaker (b. 1570)
- September 3 – John Gordon, Scottish bishop (b. 1544)
- September 7
  - Marko Krizin, Croatian Catholic priest (martyred) (b. 1585)
  - Stephen Pongracz, Hungarian saint (b. 1584)
  - Sur Singh, ruler of Marwar (b. 1571)
- October
  - Robert Peake the Elder, English court portrait painter (b. c. 1551)
  - Nicholas Yonge, English singer and publisher (b. c. 1560)
- October 9 – Joseph Pardo, Italian rabbi and merchant (b. c. 1561)
- October 14 – Samuel Daniel, English poet (b. 1562)
- October 18 – Petrus Gudelinus, Belgian jurist (b. 1550)
- October 19 – Fujiwara Seika, Japanese philosopher (b. 1561)
- November 13 – Ludovico Carracci, Italian painter (b. 1555)
- December 23 – John Sigismund, Elector of Brandenburg from the House of Hohenzollern (b. 1572)
- December 29
  - Antoine Arnauld, French lawyer (b. 1560)
  - Prince Jeongwon, Korean prince (b. 1580)
- Bagrat VII of Kartli (b. 1569)
- François d'Amboise, French jurist and writer (b. 1550)
- Thomas Stephens, English Jesuit missionary in Portuguese India (b. c. 1549)
- Caterina Vitale, Maltese pharmacist (b. 1566)
