= 1692 =

1692 in various calendars
- Gregorian calendar: 1692; MDCXCII
- Ab urbe condita: 2445
- Armenian calendar: 1141; ԹՎ ՌՃԽԱ
- Assyrian calendar: 6442
- Balinese saka calendar: 1613–1614
- Bengali calendar: 1098–1099
- Berber calendar: 2642
- English Regnal year: 4 Will. & Mar. – 5 Will. & Mar.
- Buddhist calendar: 2236
- Burmese calendar: 1054
- Byzantine calendar: 7200–7201
- Chinese calendar: 辛未年 (Metal Goat); 4389 or 4182 — to — 壬申年 (Water Monkey); 4390 or 4183
- Coptic calendar: 1408–1409
- Discordian calendar: 2858
- Ethiopian calendar: 1684–1685
- Hebrew calendar: 5452–5453
- Hindu calendars
- Vikram Samvat: 1748–1749
- Shaka Samvat: 1613–1614
- Kali Yuga: 4792–4793
- Holocene calendar: 11692
- Igbo calendar: 692–693
- Iranian calendar: 1070–1071
- Islamic calendar: 1103–1104
- Japanese calendar: Genroku 5 (元禄５年)
- Javanese calendar: 1615–1616
- Julian calendar: Gregorian minus 10 days
- Korean calendar: 4025
- Minguo calendar: 220 before ROC 民前220年
- Nanakshahi calendar: 224
- Thai solar calendar: 2234–2235
- Tibetan calendar: ལྕགས་མོ་ལུག་ལོ་ (female Iron-Sheep); 1818 or 1437 or 665 — to — ཆུ་ཕོ་སྤྲེ་ལོ་ (male Water-Monkey); 1819 or 1438 or 666

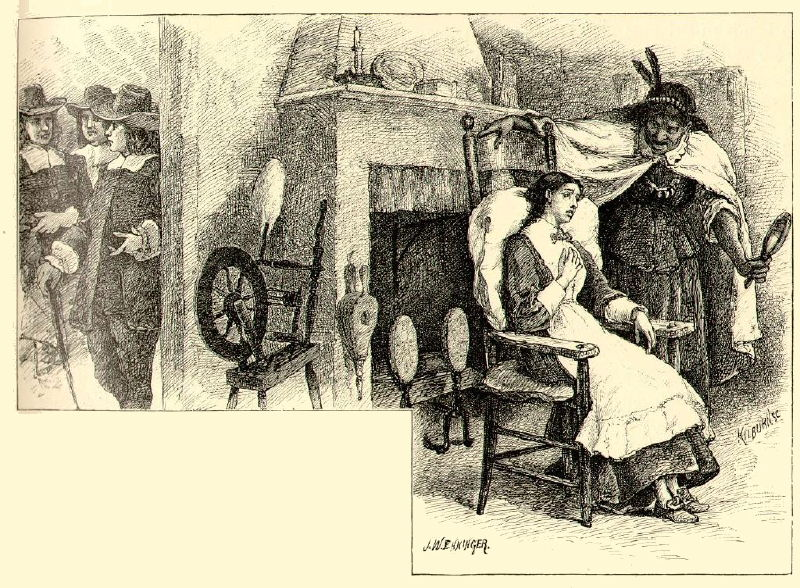
March 1: Salem witch trials: Tituba Parris becomes the first of 200 people arrested for trial on charges of witchcraft in colonial Massachusetts.

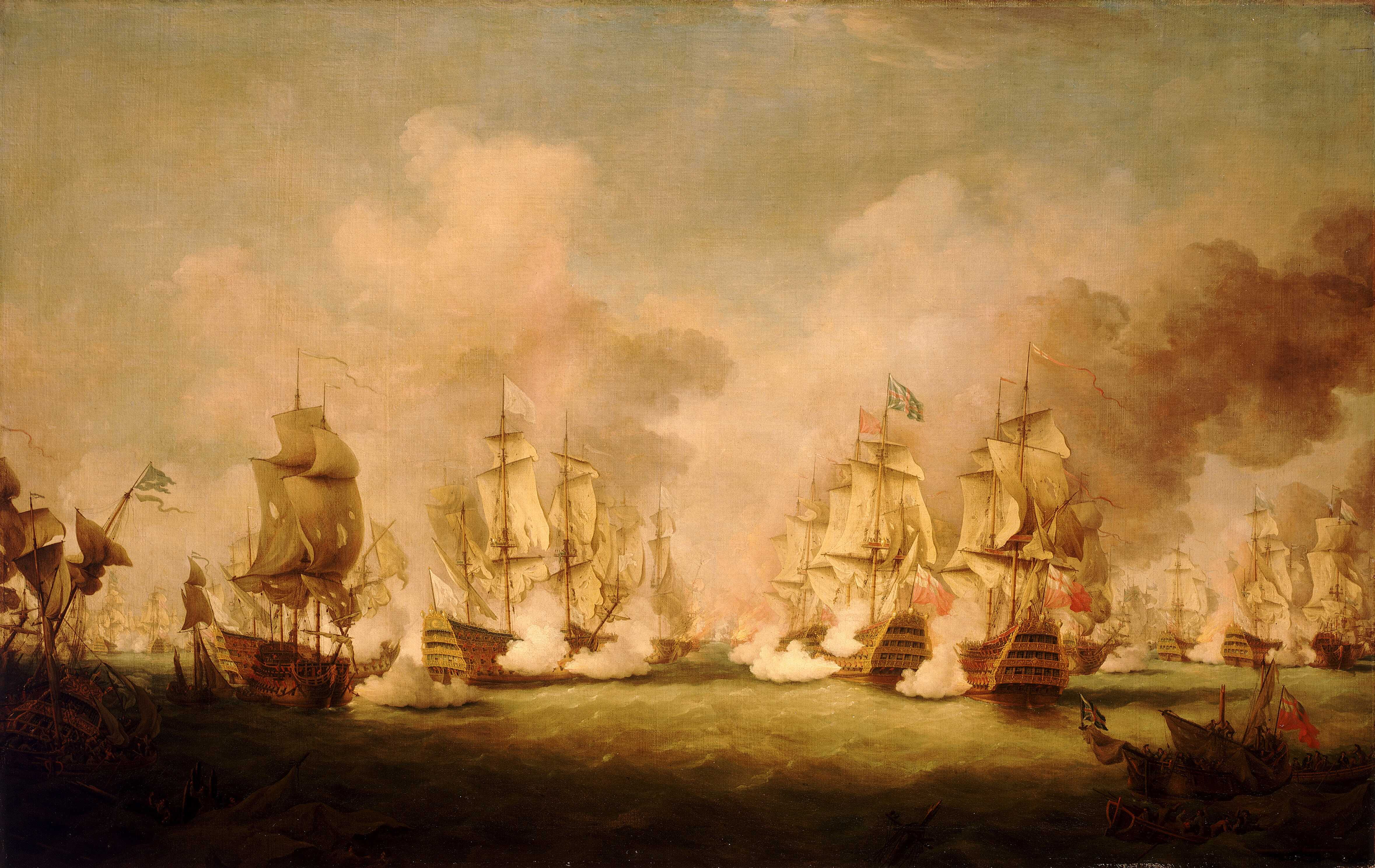
June 14: French Navy attempt to invade England thwarted at Battle of La Hougue.

1692 (MDCXCII) was a leap year starting on Tuesday of the Gregorian calendar and a leap year starting on Friday of the Julian calendar, the 1692nd year of the Common Era (CE) and Anno Domini (AD) designations, the 692nd year of the 2nd millennium, the 92nd year of the 17th century, and the 3rd year of the 1690s decade. As of the start of 1692, the Gregorian calendar was 10 days ahead of the Julian calendar, which remained in localized use until 1923.

== Events ==
=== January–March ===
- January 24 –King William's War – Candlemas Massacre: At least 75 residents of what is now York, Maine are killed by French soldiers, led by missionary Louis-Pierre Thury, along with a larger force of Abenaki and Penobscot Indians, under the command of Penobscot Chief Madockawando.
- January 30 – English Army General John Churchill, 1st Duke of Marlborough, a close adviser to King William III of England, is fired from all of his jobs by the English Secretary of State, the Earl of Nottingham, on orders of Queen Mary II.
- February 13 – Massacre of Glencoe: The forces of Robert Campbell slaughter around 30 members of the Clan MacDonald of Glencoe in Scotland (from whom they have previously accepted hospitality), for delaying to sign an oath of allegiance to King William III of England.
- February 17 – An annular solar eclipse is visible across Russia, western Mongolia, Xinjiang, Iran, Afghanistan and Iran.
- March 1 – The Salem witch trials begin in Salem Village, Massachusetts Bay Colony, with the charging of 3 women with witchcraft. Tituba, a slave owned by Samuel Parris, is the first to be arrested, and she implicates Sarah Good and Sarah Osborne, who are arrested later in the day.
- March 22 – The Kangxi Emperor of the Qing dynasty issues the Edict of Toleration, recognizing all the members of the Roman Catholic Church, not just the Jesuits, and legalizing missions and their conversion of Chinese people to the Christian Faith.

=== April–June ===
- April 18 – Giles Corey, Mary Warren, Abigail Hobbs and Bridget Bishop, all residents of Salem, Massachusetts, are arrested and charged with the practice of witchcraft.
- May 2 – The first performance of the semi-opera The Fairy-Queen by Henry Purcell, based on William Shakespeare's comedy A Midsummer Night's Dream, takes place at the Queen's Theatre, Dorset Garden in London.
- May 29 (May 19 O.S.) – Nine Years' War: Battle of Barfleur – The Anglo-Dutch fleet breaks the French line off the Cotentin Peninsula, foiling the French plan to invade England.
- June 7 – Jamaica earthquake: An earthquake and related tsunami destroy Port Royal, capital of Jamaica, and submerge a major part of it; an estimated 2,000 are immediately killed, 2,300 injured, and a probable additional 2,000 die from the diseases which ravage the island in the following months.
- June 8 – During a famine in Mexico City, an angry mob torches the Viceroy's palace and ignites the archives; most of the documents and some paintings are saved by royal geographer Carlos de Sigüenza y Góngora.
- June 10 – The Salem witch trials' first victim, Bridget Bishop, is hanged for witchcraft.
- June 13–14 (June 3–4 O.S.) – Nine Years' War: Battle of La Hogue – The action begun at Barfleur ends with further destruction of the French fleet.
- June 22 – Pope Innocent XII issues the papal bull Romanum decet Pontificem, intended to prohibit the office of cardinal-nephew and restrict related sinecures within the Roman Catholic church.

=== July–September ===
- July 1 – The siege of the Belgian city of Namur in the Spanish Netherlands ends as Dutch General Menno van Coehoorn capitulates to King Louis XIV of France after five weeks. The siege, a battle in the ongoing Nine Years War, had begun on May 24.
- July 5 – Wine shop owner Antoine Savetier and his wife are murdered by thieves in the French city of Lyon, and a peasant named Jacques Aymar-Vernay is called in as a detective to solve the case. Aymar finds one of the perpetrators, Joseph Arnoul, who confesses to the crime and implicates two accomplices who manage to escape. Arnoul is executed by being "broken on the wheel" on August 30.
- August 12
  - The city of Ponce is founded in Puerto Rico.
  - A total solar eclipse is visible in the South Atlantic Ocean.
- September 8 – An earthquake in Brabant of scale 5.8 is felt across the Low Countries, Germany and England.
- September 14 – Diego de Vargas leads Spanish colonists in retaking the city of Santa Fe, after a 12-year exile, following the Pueblo Revolt of 1680.
- September 19 – Giles Corey is pressed to death in an attempt to coerce a confession from him of witchcraft during the Salem witch trials.
- September 22 – The last of those convicted of witchcraft in the Salem witch trials are hanged. By the end of September, 14 women and 5 men have been executed by hanging. The remainder of those convicted are all eventually released.
- September 27 – The trial for sorcery of Anne Palles of Denmark begins, and she gives a long confession of giving her body and soul to Satan. The court finds her guilty on November 2 and sentences her to death.

=== October–December ===
- October 21 – In Barbados, a slave revolt is crushed.
- October 30 – The King of Spain donates the lands that become the municipalities of San Francisco and Mapulaca in Honduras.
- November 5 – Mohamed bin Hajj Ali Thukkala becomes the new Sultan of the Maldives as Muhammad Ali IV.
- November 8 – William Mountfort's play Henry The Second, King Of England; With The Death Of Rosamond is given its first performance, premiering at the Drury Lane Theatre.
- December 5 – John Goldsborough arrives in Madras as the new administrator of the British East India Company.
- December 14 – Maratha Empire General Santaji Ghorpade defeats Mughal Emperor Aurangzeb's General Alimardan Khan, captures him and brings him back to fort Jinjee near Madras.
- December 23 – Nahum Tate is named as the new Poet Laureate of the United Kingdom and serves for 22 years until his death.
- December 24 – The French ship Soleil Royal, a three-decker First Rank ship with 104 guns, is launched at Brest Dockyard.

== Births ==
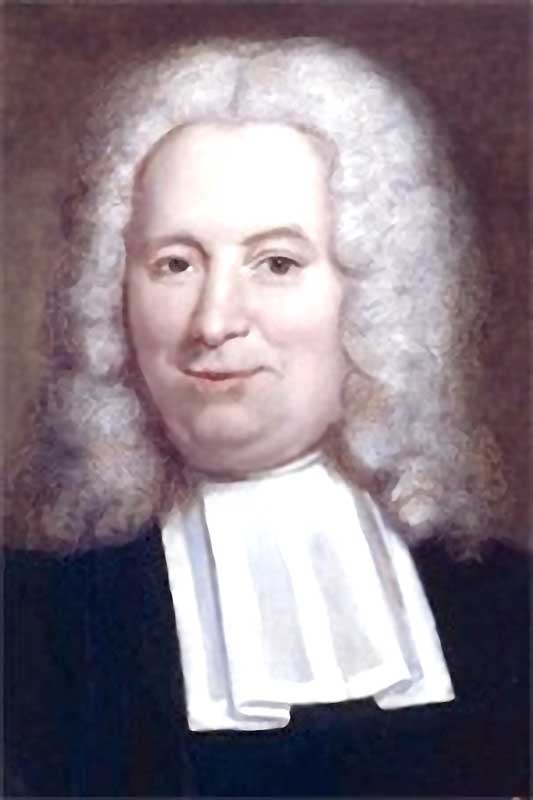
Petrus Wesseling born 7 January

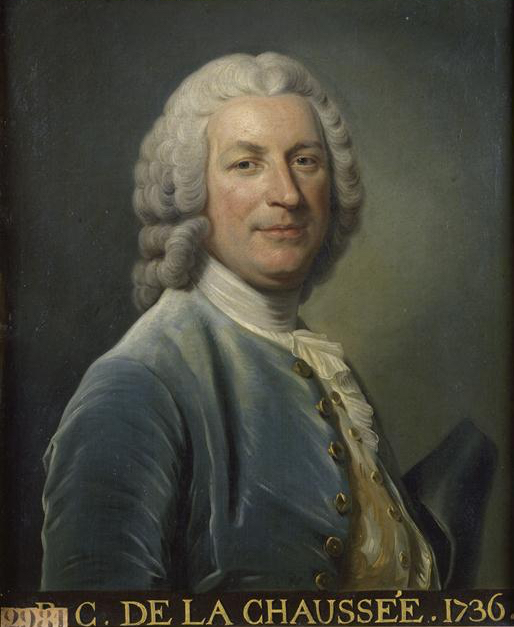
Pierre-Claude Nivelle de La Chaussée born 14 February

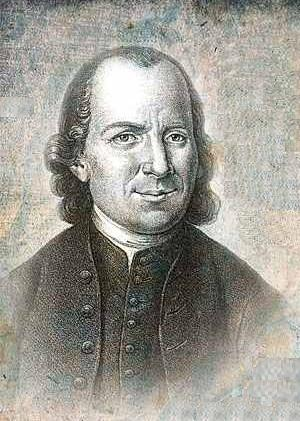
Christian David born 17 February

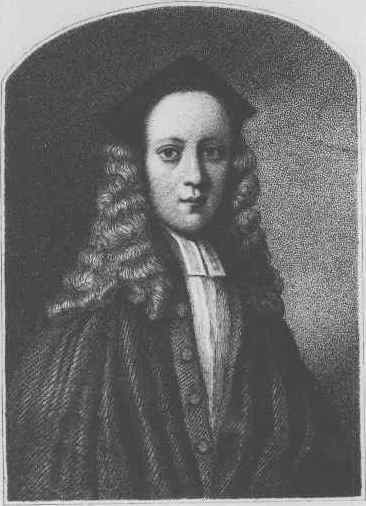
John Byrom born 29 February

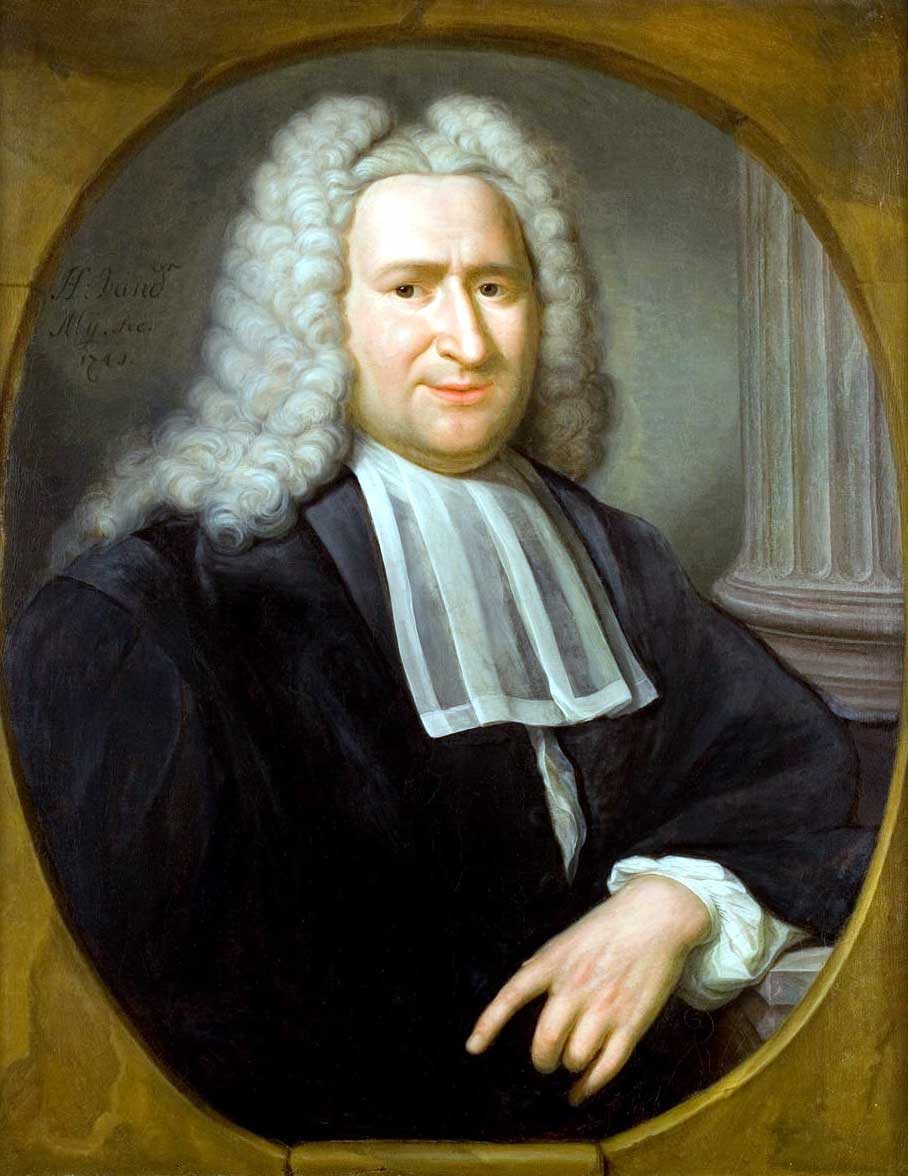
Pieter van Musschenbroek born 14 March

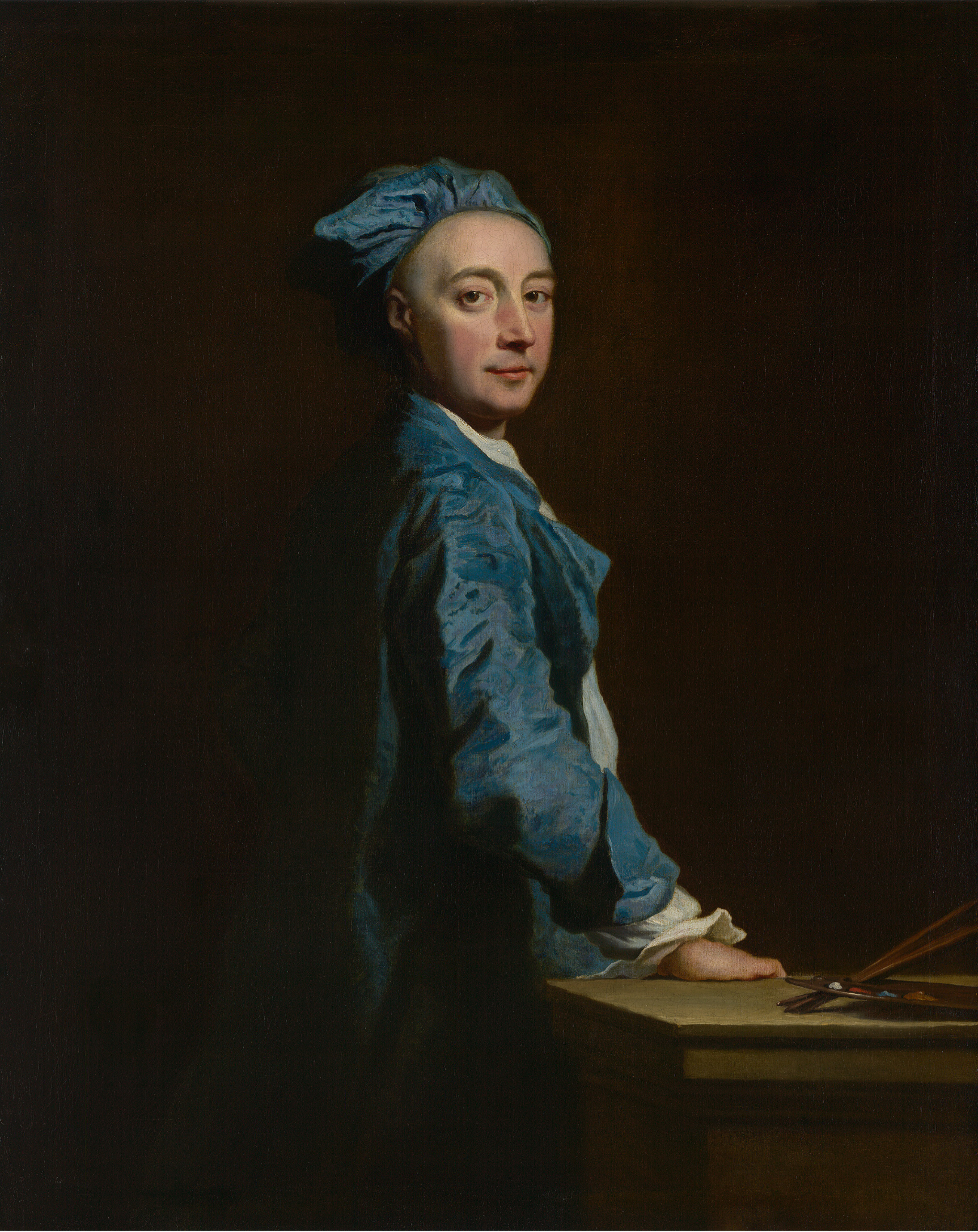
Joseph Highmore born 13 June

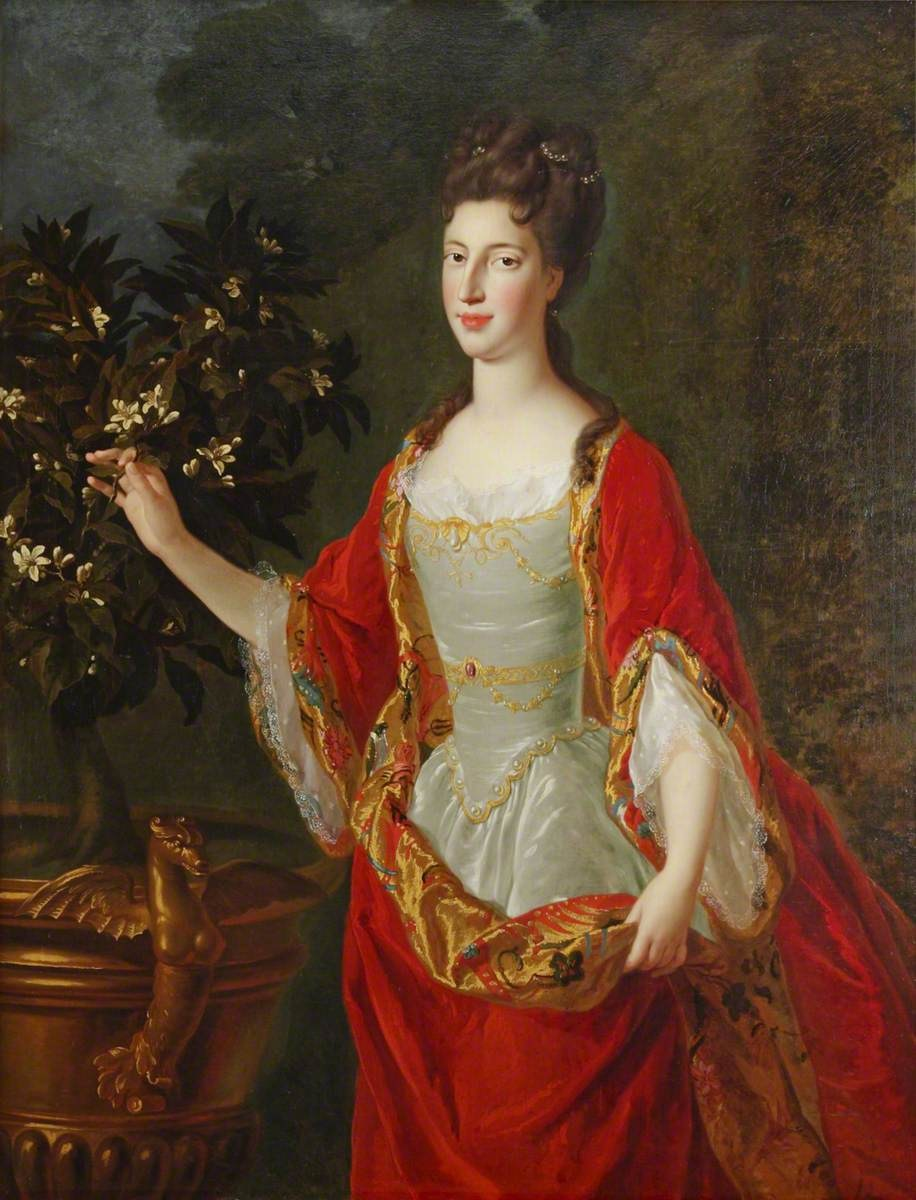
Louisa Maria Stuart born 28 June

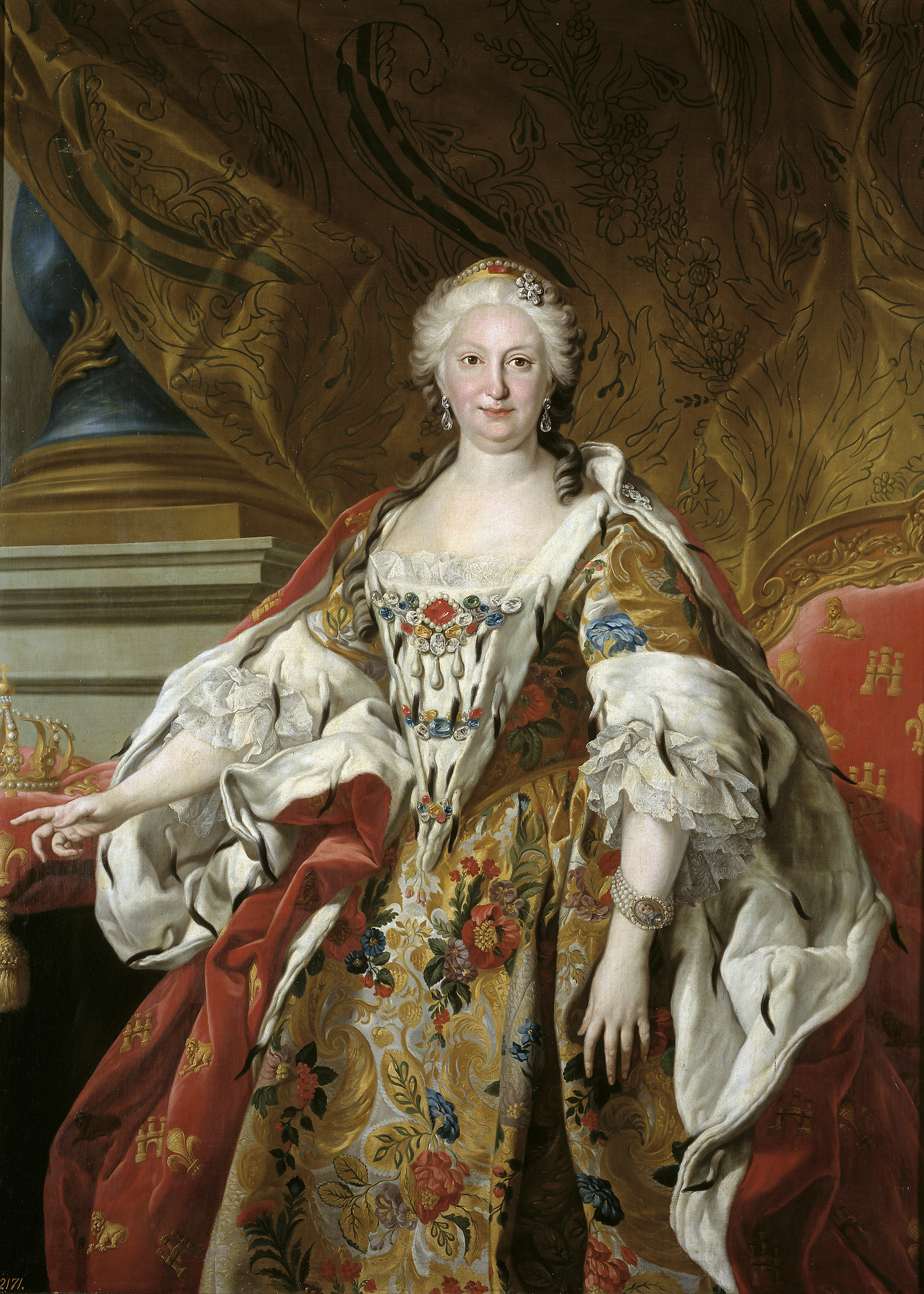
Elisabeth Farnese born 25 October

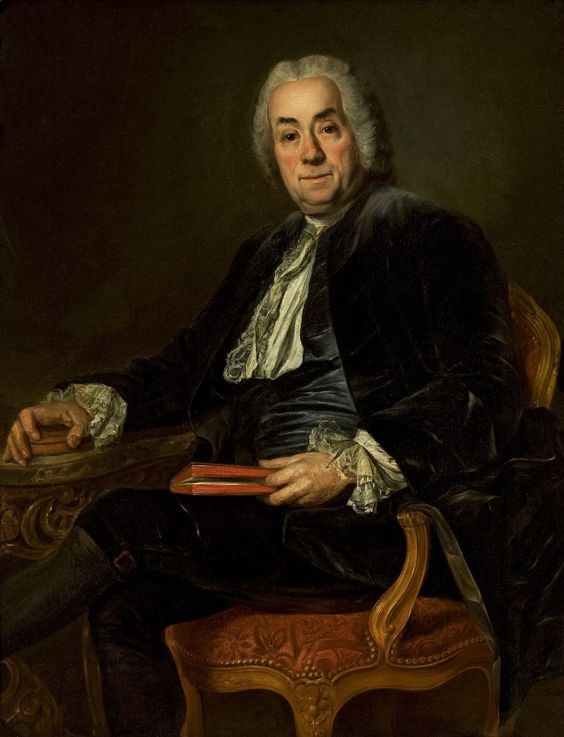
Anne Claude de Caylus born 31 October

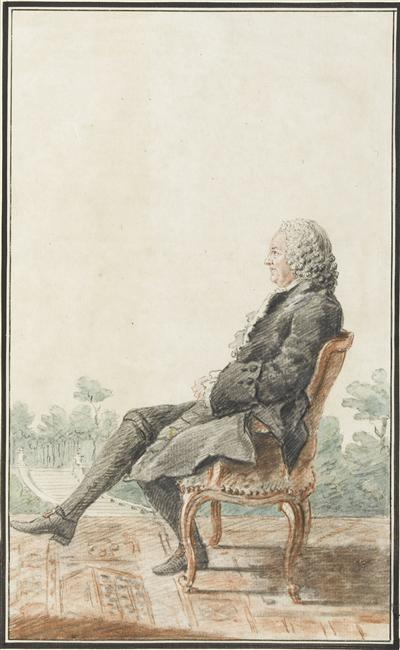
Louis Racine born 6 November

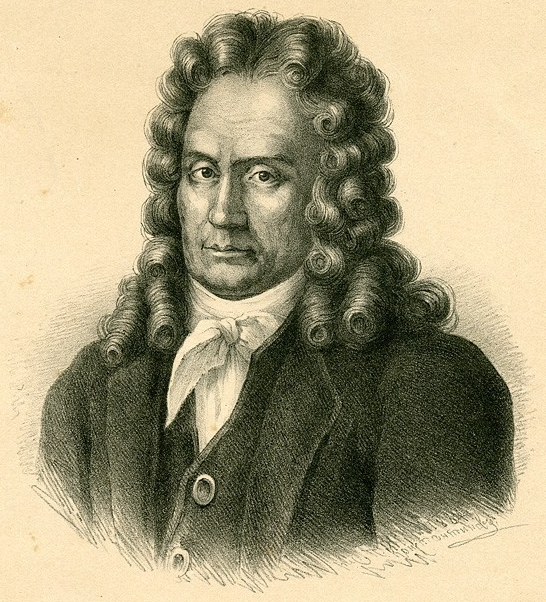
Laurentius Blumentrost born 8 November

=== January–March ===
- January 6 – Francesco Maria Zanotti, Italian philosopher (d. 1777)
- January 7 – Petrus Wesseling, German librarian, law librarian and writer (d. 1764)
- January 12 – Ferdinand Maximilian II of Isenburg-Wächtersbach, count of Isenburg-Wächtersbach (d. 1755)
- January 13 – Gunnila Grubb, Swedish spiritual poet (d. 1729)
- January 24 – Paweł Giżycki, Polish painter and architect (d. 1762)
- January 27 – Ivan Cherkasov, Russian statesman, privy councillor, and cabinet secretary (d. 1758)
- January 30 – William Granville, 3rd Earl of Bath, English peer (d. 1711)
- January 31 – John Conybeare, British bishop (d. 1755)
- February 13 – Louis, Prince of Lambesc, French prince (d. 1743)
- February 14 – Pierre-Claude Nivelle de La Chaussée, French playwright (d. 1754)
- February 16 – Giovanni Domenico Mansi, Roman Catholic archbishop (d. 1769)
- February 17 – Christian David, German religious servant, missionary and carpenter (d. 1751)
- February 18 – Johann Michael Fischer, German architect (d. 1766)
- February 25
  - John Hawkins, Master of Pembroke College, Cambridge (d. 1733)
  - Karl Ludwig von Pöllnitz, German soldier, adventurer and writer (d. 1775)
- February 29 – John Byrom, poet, inventor of a shorthand system (d. 1763)
- March 5 – Sir John Shelley, 4th Baronet, English politician (d. 1771)
- March 14 – Pieter van Musschenbroek, Dutch naturalist (d. 1761)
- March 25 – Tokugawa Tsugutomo, daimyo (d. 1731)
- March 26 – Jean Restout the Younger, French painter (d. 1768)

=== April–June ===
- April 1 – William, Landgrave of Hesse-Philippsthal-Barchfeld (d. 1761)
- April 4
  - James Carnegie, 5th Earl of Southesk, Scottish earl (d. 1730)
  - André Souste, Royal Notary in Canada (d. 1776)
- April 5
  - Jean Calmette, French jesuit and indologist (d. 1740)
  - Adrienne Lecouvreur, French actress (d. 1730)
- April 7 – Pietro Marchesini, Italian painter (d. 1757)
- April 8 – Giuseppe Tartini, Italian composer and violinist (d. 1770)
- April 22 – James Stirling, Scottish mathematician (d. 1770)
- April 29 – Jean Armand de Lestocq, French adventurer (d. 1767)
- May 3 – Jan Jacob Mauricius, Dutch diplomat (d. 1768)
- May 9 – Giuseppe Agostino Orsi, Catholic cardinal (d. 1761)
- May 10 – John Brailsford the elder, English poet (d. 1739)
- May 11 – Sir Thomas Sebright, 4th Baronet, English politician, 1692–1736 (d. 1736)
- May 16 – Dolly Pentreath, last known native speaker of the Cornish language prior to its revival in 1904 (d. 1777)
- May 17 – Edward Lisle, British Member of Parliament (d. 1753)
- May 18 – (O.S) Joseph Butler, English bishop and philosopher (d. 1752)
- May 25 – Archibald Douglas, 2nd Earl of Forfar, Scottish earl (d. 1715)
- May 28
  - Geminiano Giacomelli, Italian composer (d. 1740)
  - Karl von Haimhausen, German missionary (d. 1767)
- June 13 – Joseph Highmore, British artist (d. 1780)
- June 15
  - Giovanni Domenico Ferretti, Italian painter (d. 1768)
  - Ōkubo Tadamasa, daimyo (d. 1732)
- June 28 – Louisa Maria Stuart, British princess (d. 1712)
- June 29 – Jean-François Du Bellay du Resnel, French Roman Catholic priest (d. 1761)

=== July–September ===
- July 1 – Antonio Sandini, Italian ecclesiastical historian (d. 1751)
- July 7 – Edward Montagu, Viscount Hinchingbrooke, British politician and noble (d. 1722)
- July 16 – Antoine Thiout, clockmaker (d. 1767)
- July 19 – Frederick William, Duke of Courland (d. 1711)
- July 24 – Sir James Dalrymple, 2nd Baronet, British politician (d. 1751)
- August 3 – John Henley, English clergyman (d. 1756)
- August 6 – Peter Burrell, politician (d. 1756)
- August 8 – Juan Manuel de la Puente, Spanish composer (d. 1753)
- August 14 – Frederick Anton, Prince of Schwarzburg-Rudolstadt (d. 1744)
- August 18
  - Jacob Folkema, Dutch engraver (d. 1767)
  - Louis Henri, Duke of Bourbon, French politician and prince (d. 1740)
- August 27 – Jacob Christiaan Pielat, Dutch colonial governor (d. 1740)
- August 29 – Nicolas Grozelier, French writer (d. 1778)
- September 1 – Egid Quirin Asam, German sculptor (d. 1750)
- September 11 – Ingela Gathenhielm, Swedish privateer (d. 1729)
- September 12 – Christine Eleonore of Stolberg-Gedern (d. 1745)
- September 15 – Anselm Franz von Ritter zu Groenesteyn, German architect (d. 1765)
- September 16 – Johanna Elisabeth Döbricht, German soprano (d. 1786)
- September 25 – Franz Albert Schultz, German academic (d. 1763)
- September 26
  - Ernst von Steinberg, Hanoverian minister and head of the German Chancery in London (d. 1759)
  - Pietro Antonio Trezzini, Russian architect (d. 1760)
- September 27 – Georg Heinrich Zincke, German academic (d. 1769)

=== October–December ===
- October 3 – Pierre Grimod du Fort, French art collector (d. 1748)
- October 4 – Francis Willoughby, 2nd Baron Middleton, British politician (d. 1758)
- October 6 – Johann Heinrich Pott, German chemist (d. 1777)
- October 8 – Antonio Palella, Italian composer (d. 1761)
- October 15 – Alessandro Albani, collector of antiquities, Roman Catholic cardinal (d. 1779)
- October 18 – Magnus Beronius, Swedish archbishop (d. 1775)
- October 19 – Jehu Curtis, American judge (d. 1753)
- October 24 – Albert Brahms, German pioneer hydraulic engineer (d. 1758)
- October 25 – Elisabeth Farnese, queen of Philip V of Spain (d. 1766)
- October 28 – Joseph Ferdinand of Bavaria, Electoral Prince of Bavaria (d. 1699)
- October 30 – Unico Wilhelm van Wassenaer, Dutch noble, diplomat and composer (d. 1766)
- October 31 – Anne Claude de Caylus, French antiquarian (d. 1765)
- November 6 – Louis Racine, French poet of the Age of the Enlightenment (d. 1763)
- November 7
  - Johann Gottfried Schnabel, German writer (d. 1750)
  - Giuseppe Ginanni, Italian scientist (d. 1753)
- November 8 – Laurentius Blumentrost, Russian court physician and founder and first president of St. Petersburg Academy of Sciences (d. 1755)
- November 11
  - Muhammad Hashim Thattvi, Islamic scholar, author, philanthropist, and spiritual leader (d. 1761)
  - Louis Guy Henri de Valori, French diplomat (d. 1774)
- November 15 – Eusebius Amort, German Roman Catholic theologian (d. 1775)
- November 17 – John Betts Jr., Connecticut politician (d. 1767)
- November 21 – Carlo Innocenzo Frugoni, Italian poet (d. 1768)
- November 28
  - Willoughby Bertie, 3rd Earl of Abingdon (d. 1760)
  - Esprit Pezenas, French astronomer (d. 1776)
- November 30 – Livio Retti, Italian artist (d. 1751)
- December 1 – Isaac Kimber, English journalist and minister (d. 1755)
- December 4 – Ferdinand Leopold, Count of Hohenzollern-Sigmaringen, German nobleman; ruling Count of Hohenzollern-Haigerloch (d. 1750)
- (baptised) December 27 – Francis Blake Delaval, British Royal Navy officer and Member of Parliament (d. 1752)
- December 28 – Robert Shirley, Viscount Tamworth, English politician (d. 1714)
- December 29
  - Thomas Angell, Norwegian merchant/estate/mine owner/philanthropist (d. 1767)
  - Franz Georg Hermann, German painter (d. 1768)
- December 30 – Marie Christine Felizitas of Leiningen-Dagsburg-Falkenburg-Heidesheim (d. 1734)

== Deaths ==
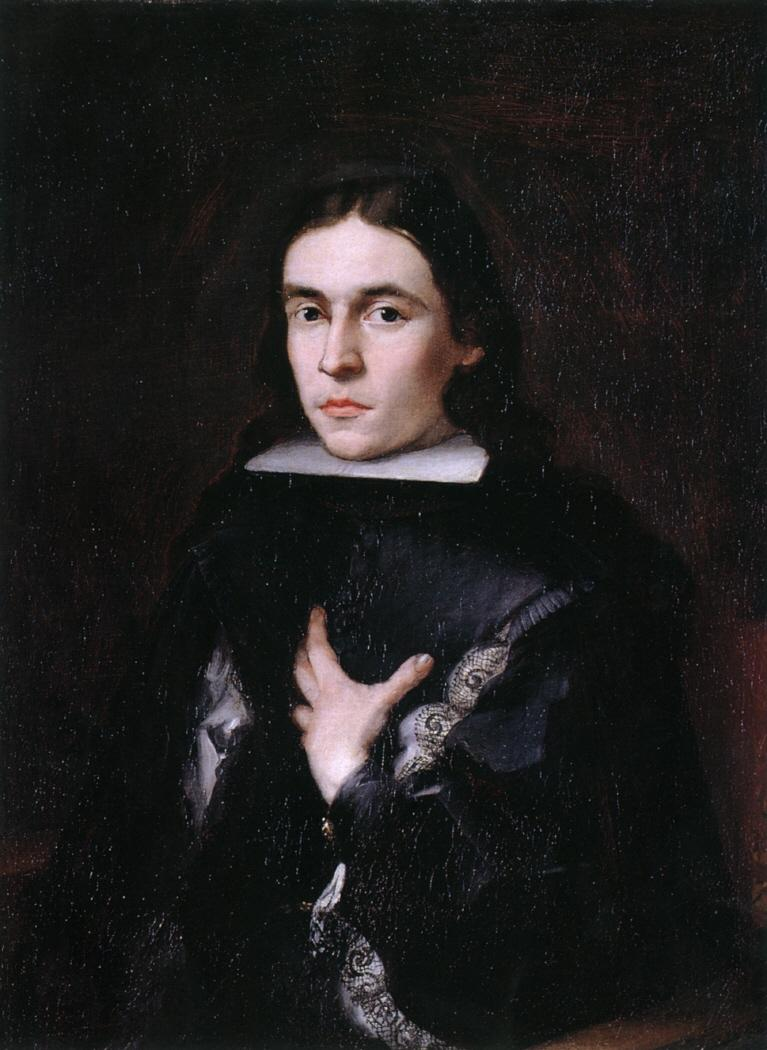
Fernando de Valenzuela, 1st Marquis of Villasierra died 7 January

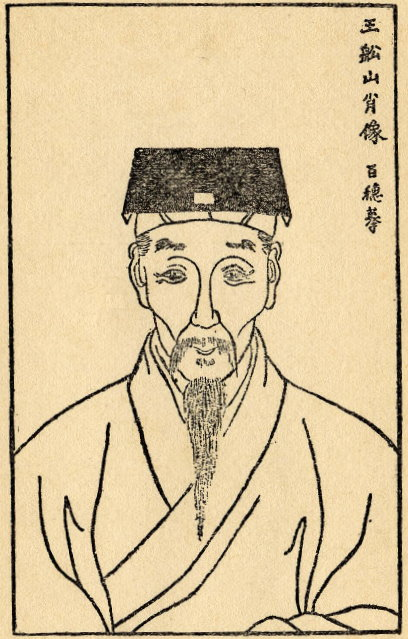
Wang Fuzhi died 18 February

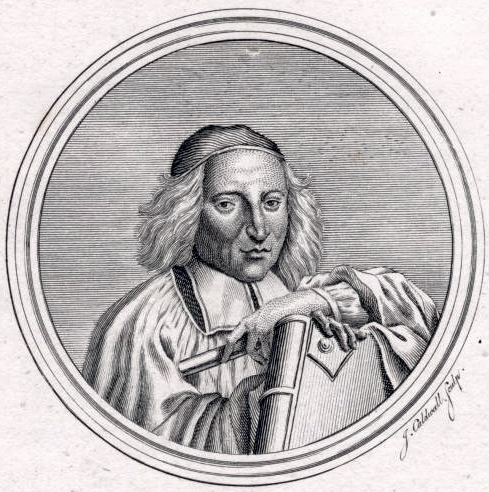
Antimo Liberati died 24 February

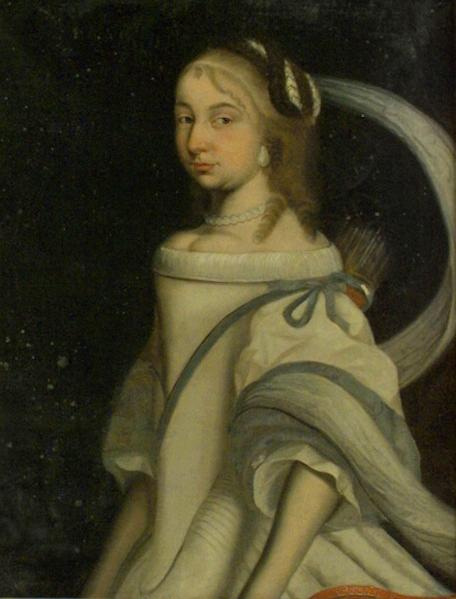
Countess Palatine Eleonora Catherine of Zweibrücken died 3 March

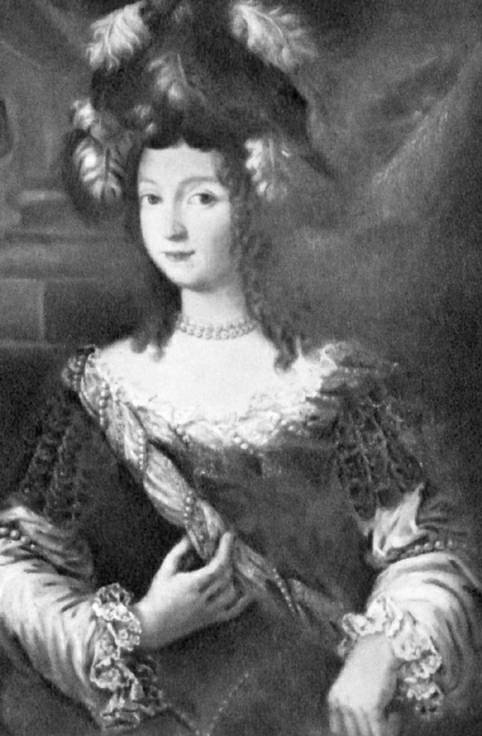
Princess Luisa Cristina of Savoy died 12 May

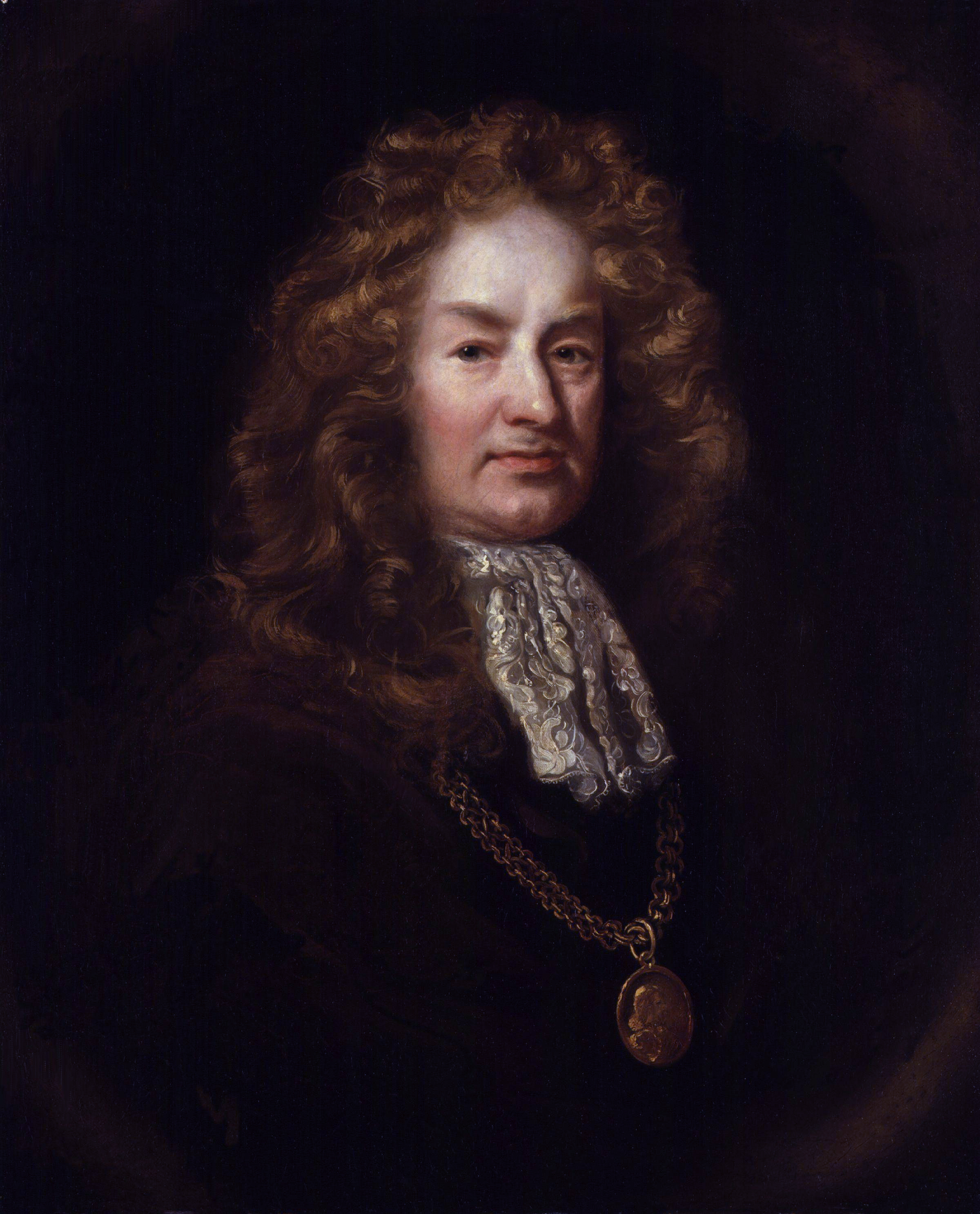
Elias Ashmole died 18 May

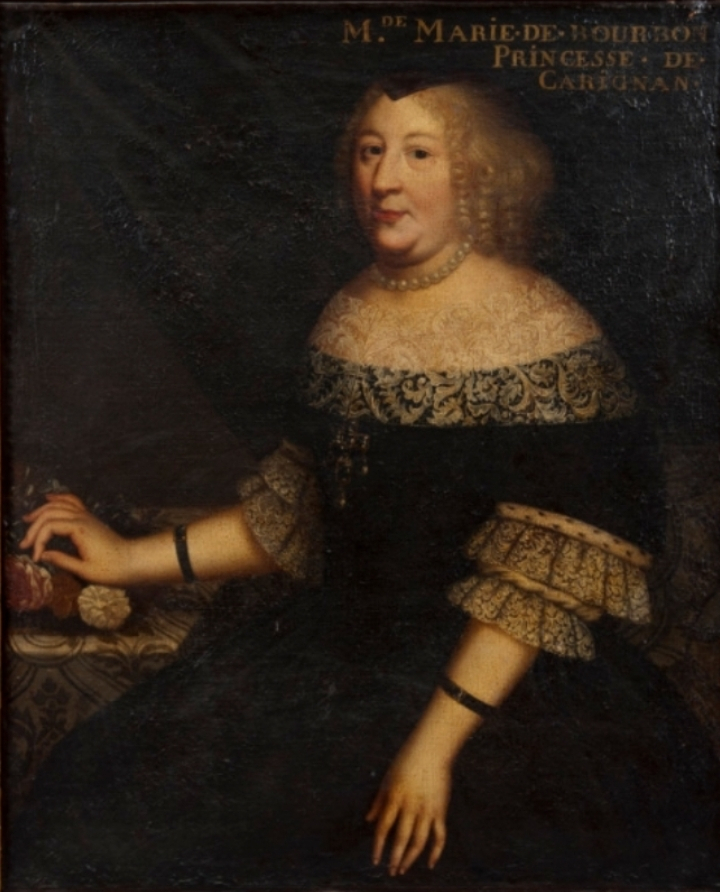
Marie de Bourbon, Countess of Soissons died 3 June

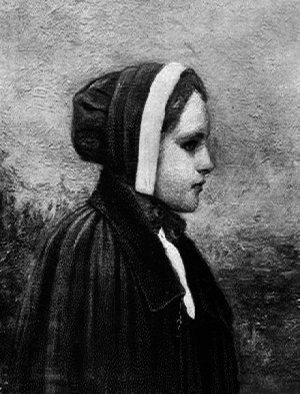
Bridget Bishop died 10 June

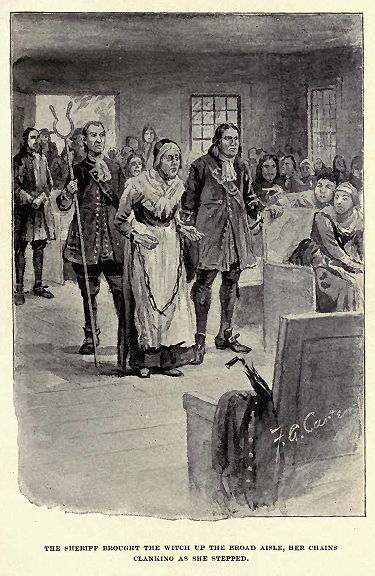
Rebecca Nurse died 19 July

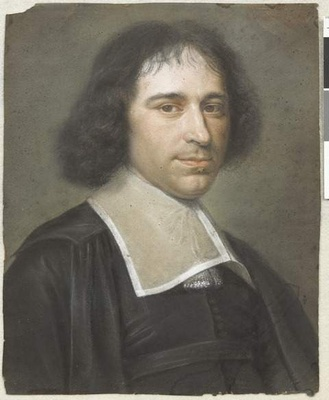
Gilles Ménage died 23 July

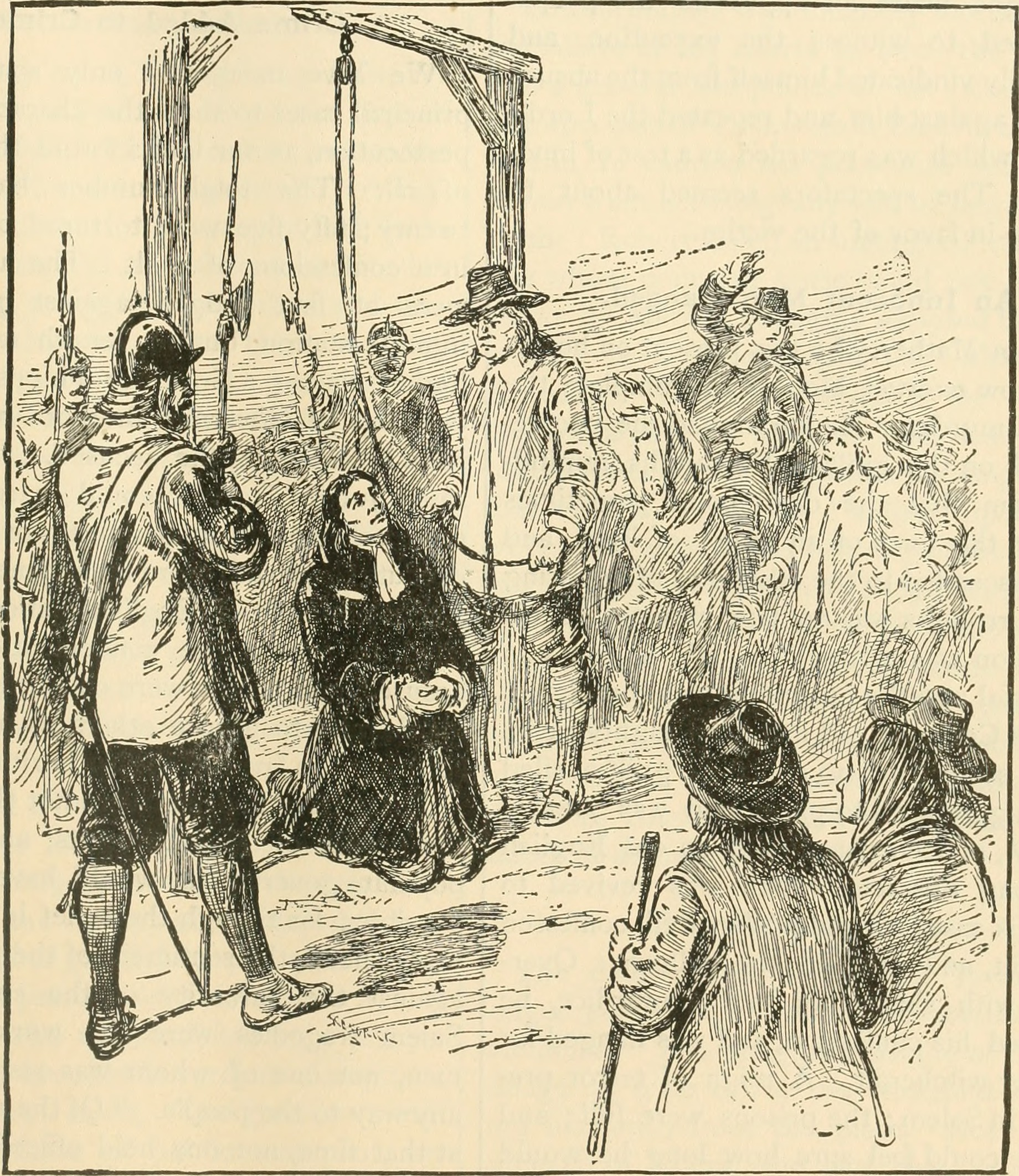
George Burroughs died 19 August

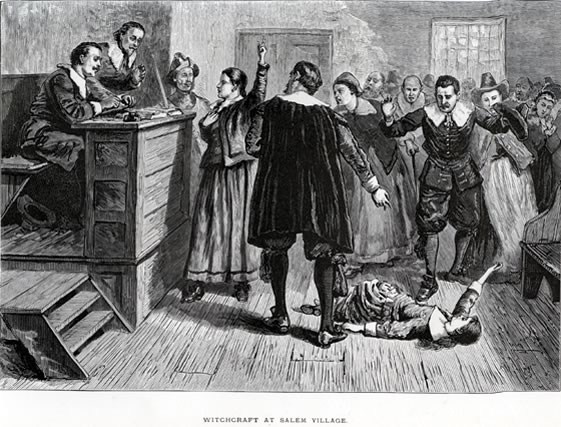
Martha Carrier (Salem witch trials) died 19 August

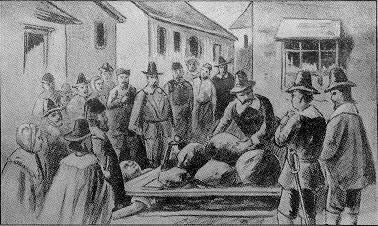
Giles Corey died 19 September

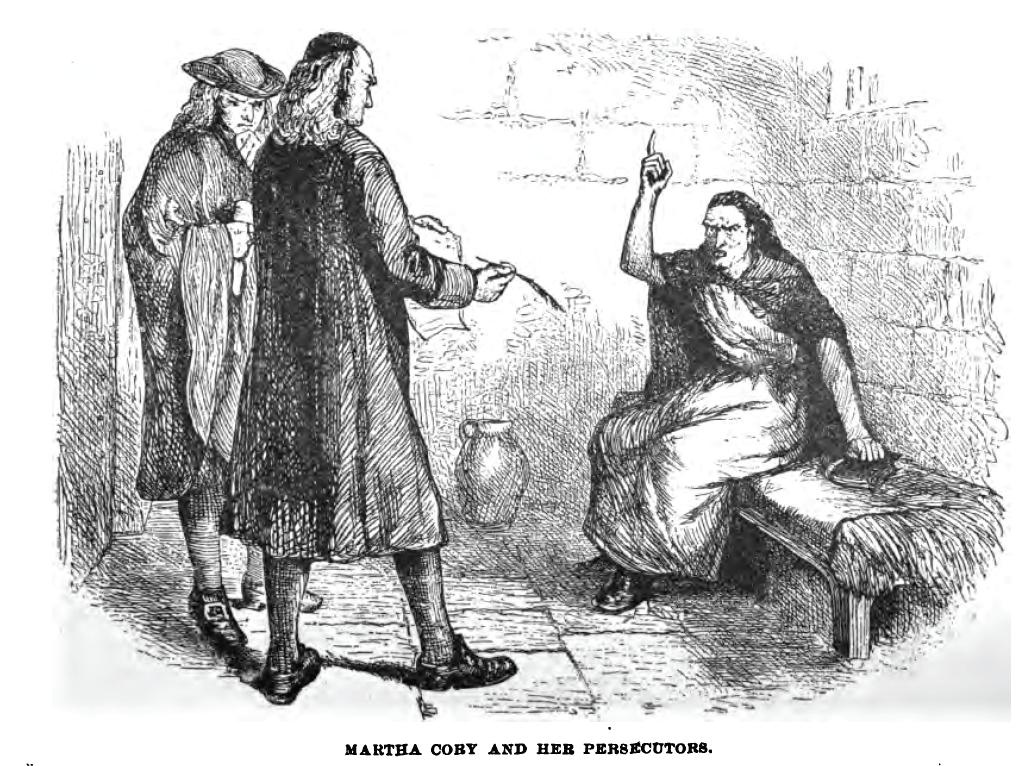
Martha Corey died 22 September

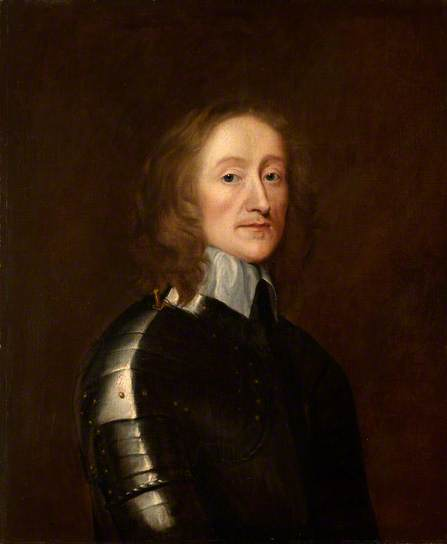
Charles Fleetwood died 4 October

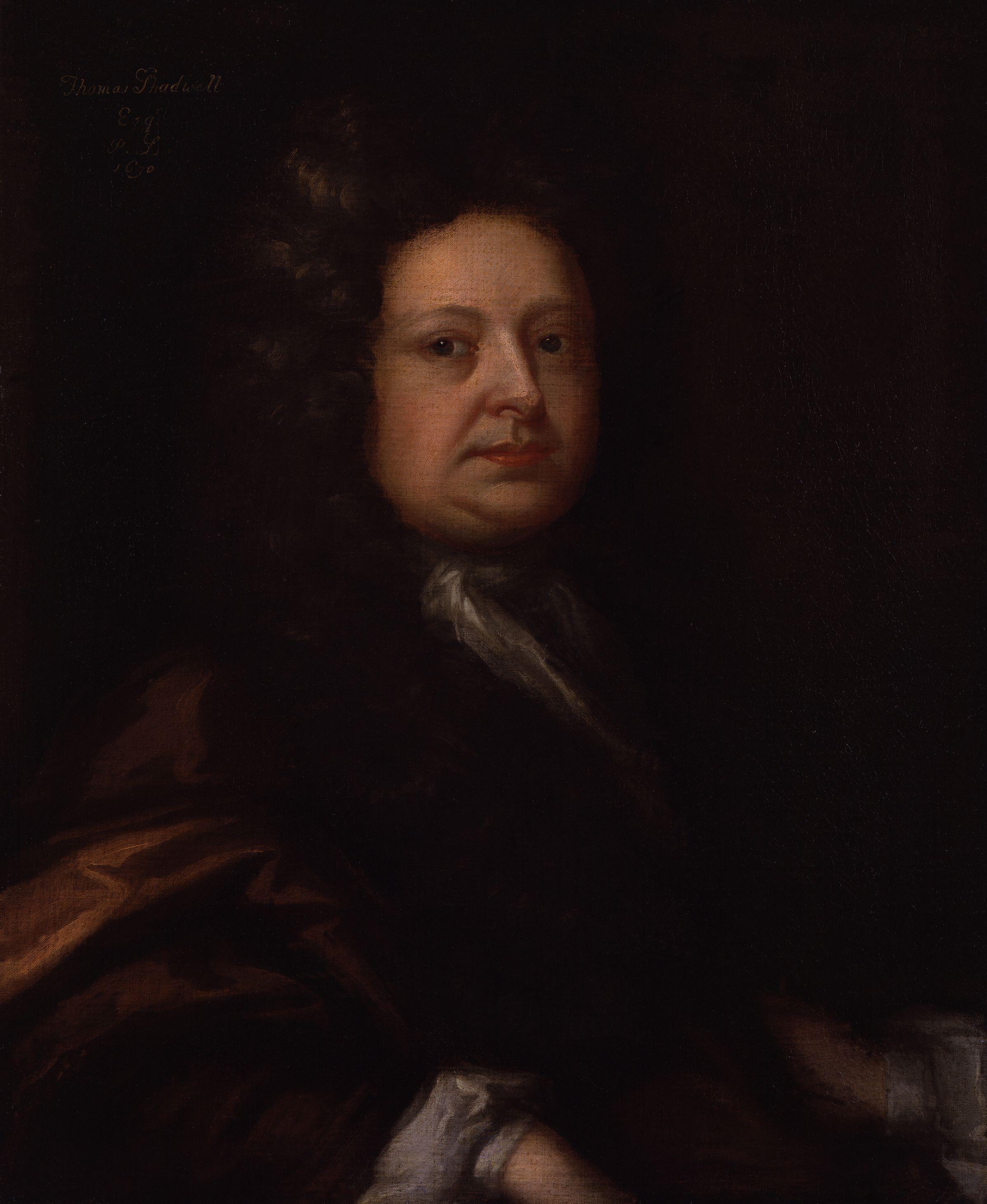
Thomas Shadwell died 19 November

John Russell (clergyman) died 10 December

=== January–March ===
- January 3 – Roelant Roghman, painter and engraver from the Northern Netherlands (b. 1627)
- January 4
  - Paul Colomiès, French librarian (b. 1638)
  - Jean Crasset, French theologian (b. 1618)
  - Thomas Hog, parish minister (b. 1628)
  - Rombaut Pauwels, Flemish sculptor (b. 1625)
- January 7 – Fernando de Valenzuela, 1st Marquis of Villasierra, Spanish noble (b. 1636)
- January 8 – Robert Lichton, Swedish count, lieutenant-general and statesman (b. 1631)
- January 11 – Thomas Bilson, English Member of Parliament (b. 1655)
- January 16
  - William O'Brien, 2nd Earl of Inchiquin, Irish nobleman (b. 1640)
  - Thomas Wynne, Welsh-American physician and politician (b. 1627)
- January 19 – Jan Commelin, Dutch botanist (b. 1629)
- January 22
  - Sir James Long, 2nd Baronet, English politician; (b. 1617)
  - Lewis Owen, Welsh politician (b. 1622)
- January 23 – John Page, Virginian planter, merchant and politician (b. 1627)
- January 25 – Shubael Dummer, American Congregational church minister (b. 1636)
- January 27 – Thomas Grove, English politician (b. 1609)
- January 28 – Henry Bull, English lawyer and politician (b. 1630)
- February 3 – Jane Granville, Countess of Bath (b. 1630)
- February 4 – Francesco Niccolini, apostolic nuncio (b. 1639)
- February 5 – Joshua Brooksbank, Church of Ireland priest (b. 1642)
- February 6 – George Durant, attorney in the Province of Carolina (b. 1632)
- February 8 – Matthias Tanner, Czech baroque writer, religious writer and Roman Catholic priest (b. 1630)
- February 9 – Sir Coplestone Bampfylde, 2nd Baronet, English politician (b. 1637)
- February 11 – Anders Paulsen, Sami noaidi (b. 1600)
- February 12 – Hendrick Hamel, Dutch journalist (b. 1630)
- February 14 – Thomas Rosewell, English nonconformist minister convicted of treason (b. 1630)
- February 15 – Thomas Mun, English politician, Member of Parliament (b. 1645)
- February 16 – David Lloyd, Welsh biographer, born 1635 (b. 1635)
- February 18 – Wang Fuzhi, Chinese essayist, historian and philosopher (b. 1619)
- February 23 – Bartholomeus Eggers, Flemish sculptor (b. 1637)
- February 24 – Antimo Liberati, Italian composer (b. 1617)
- March 1 – La Grange, French actor (b. 1635)
- March 3 – Countess Palatine Eleonora Catherine of Zweibrücken, sister of King Charles X of Sweden (b. 1626)
- March 7 – Henry Muddiman, English journalist (b. 1629)
- March 9 – Willem de Heusch, Dutch painter (b. 1625)
- March 13 – Augustine Reding, Swiss abbot and theologian (b. 1625)

=== April–June ===
- April 2 – Sir John Lauder, 1st Baronet, Scottish noble (b. 1595)
- April 5 – Tomás Carbonell, Roman Catholic bishop (b. 1620)
- April 6 – Emmanuel Schelstrate, Belgian theologian (b. 1649)
- April 14 – Carlos de Aragón de Gurrea, 9th Duke of Villahermosa, Spanish nobleman, viceroy and governor (b. 1634)
- April 17 – Abraham-César Lamoureux, French sculptor who worked mainly in Sweden and Denmark (b. 1640)
- April 22
  - Tomás de la Cerda, 3rd Marquess of la Laguna de Camero Viejo, Spanish nobleman (b. 1638)
  - Jean Le Noir, theologian (b. 1622)
- April 23
  - Giuseppe Eusanio, Roman Catholic prelate, Titular Bishop of Porphyreon (b. 1619)
  - Edward Howard, 2nd Earl of Carlisle, English politician (b. 1646)
  - Pieter Withoos, painter from the Northern Netherlands (b. 1655)
  - Johannes Zollikofer, Swiss vicar (b. 1633)
- April 30 – Kim Man-jung, Korean novelist and politician (b. 1637)
- May 3 – Edward Evelyn, British politician (b. 1626)
- May 4 – Charles III, Duke of Elbeuf, French noble (b. 1620)
- May 6 – Nathaniel Lee, English dramatist (b. 1653)
- May 9 – Albrecht of Saxe-Weissenfels, German prince (b. 1659)
- May 12 – Princess Luisa Cristina of Savoy, Princess of Savoy (b. 1629)
- May 14 – Robert Kirk, Scottish folklorist, Bible translator, Gaelic scholar (b. 1644)
- May 18 – Elias Ashmole, English antiquarian (b. 1617)
- May 21 – John Jones, English merchant and politician (b. 1610)
- May 31
  - Anthony Aucher, English politician (b. 1614)
  - Nicholas Dennys, English politician (b. 1616)
  - Michele Foscarini, Italian historian (b. 1632)
  - Thomas Jones, English politician and judge (b. 1614)
- June 3 – Marie de Bourbon, Countess of Soissons, wife of Thomas Francis (b. 1606)
- June 7 – Pierre Bailloquet, Jesuit missionary to the Canadian Indians (b. 1612)
- June 8 – Henri Arnauld, French bishop (b. 1597)
- June 9 – Rebecca Rawson, Massachusetts heroine of the 1849 book Leaves from Margaret Smith's Journal (b. 1656)
- June 10 – Bridget Bishop, woman executed for witchcraft during Salem witch trials (b. 1632)
- June 18 – Michelangelo Falvetti, Italian composer (b. 1642)
- June 21 – Christian Louis I, Duke of Mecklenburg-Schwerin (b. 1623)
- June 23 – Gerard Langbaine, English dramatic biographer and critic (b. 1656)

=== July–September ===
- July 7 – Eusébio de Matos, Brazilian orator, religious and painter (b. 1629)
- July 10 – Heinrich Bach, German organist and composer (b. 1615)
- July 14 – Patrick Russell, Irish bishop (b. 1629)
- July 19
  - Mercy Good, accused of witchcraft in the Salem witch trials (b. 1653)
  - Sarah Good, accused of witchcraft in the Salem witch trials (b. 1653)
  - Elizabeth Howe, one of the accused in the Salem witch trials (b. 1635)
  - Susannah Martin, woman executed for witchcraft (b. 1621)
  - Rebecca Nurse, convicted of witchcraft during the Salem witch trials (b. 1621)
  - Sarah Wildes, Salem "witch" (b. 1627)
- July 22 – Pietro del Pò, Italian painter (b. 1616)
- July 23 – Gilles Ménage, French scholar (b. 1613)
- July 31 – William Harbord, British politician (b. 1635)
- August 1 – Sir John Carew, 3rd Baronet, Member of Parliament of England (b. 1635)
- August 3
  - James Douglas, Earl of Angus, Scottish nobleman and soldier (b. 1671)
  - Frederick, Duke of Schleswig-Holstein-Sonderburg-Augustenburg, German nobleman (b. 1652)
- August 4 – Jean-Michel-d'Astorg Aubarède, Vicar Capitular of Pamiers (b. 1639)
- August 12 – Nathaniel Colburn, early settler and selectman in Dedham (b. 1611)
- August 14 – Nicolas Chorier, French historian, lawyer and writer (b. 1612)
- August 19
  - George Burroughs, American pastor convicted of witchcraft (b. 1652)
  - Martha Carrier, executed for withcraft (b. 1650)
  - George Jacobs, English Colonist during the Salem Witch Trials (b. 1609)
  - John Proctor, convicted of witchcraft during the Salem Witch Trials (b. 1632)
  - John Willard, Salem Witch (b. 1657)
- August 23 – Randall Holden, colonial Rhode Island settler (b. 1612)
- August 24 – William Stewart, 1st Viscount Mountjoy, Anglo-Irish peer and soldier (b. 1653)
- August 25 – Aleijda Wolfsen, painter from the Northern Netherlands (b. 1648)
- September 3 – David Ancillon, French Huguenot pastor and author (b. 1617)
- September 4 – Claus Røyem, Dano-Norwegian civil servant and government official (b. 1638)
- September 6 – Hartvig Asche von Schack (b. 1644)
- September 15 – César Vichard de Saint-Réal, French polyglot (b. 1639)
- September 19 – Giles Corey, Massachusetts farmer and accused wizard (b. 1611)
- September 21 – Ermes di Colorêt, Italian poet, political figure (b. 1622)
- September 22
  - Martha Corey, convicted of being a witch during the 1692 Salem witch trials (b. 1619)
  - Mary Eastey, woman executed in the Salem witch trials (b. 1634)
  - Mary Parker, Massachusetts colony member accused of witchcraft (b. 1637)
  - Margaret Scott, hanged as part of the Salem witch trials (b. 1615)
  - Samuel Wardwell, hanged as part of the Salem witch trials (b. 1643)
- September 28 – Cornelis Bloemaert, Dutch painter (b. 1603)

=== October–December ===
- October 1 – Diego de Aguilar, Spanish bishop (b. 1616)
- October 2 – Ann Pudeator, woman executed in the Salem witch trials (b. 1621)
- October 4 – Charles Fleetwood, English Parliamentarian soldier and politician, Lord Deputy of Ireland (b. 1618)
- October 5
  - David Atwater, American colonist (b. 1615)
  - Alfonso Bernardo de los Ríos y Guzmán, archbishop of Granada (b. 1626)
- October 12 – Giovanni Battista Vitali, Italian composer (b. 1632)
- October 15 – Johannes Maximus Stainer von Pleinfelden, Roman Catholic prelate, Auxiliary Bishop of Passau (b. 1610)
- October 16 – Christian Albert, Margrave of Brandenburg-Ansbach (b. 1675)
- October 23 – Alexander von Spaen, German general (b. 1619)
- October 25 – Jasper Schade van Westrum, Dutch representative to the States-General (b. 1623)
- October 27 – Anna Mikhailovna of Russia (b. 1630)
- October 29 – Melchisédech Thévenot, French scientist (b. 1620)
- October 30 – William Bentney, English priest (b. 1609)
- November 2 – Thomas Rudyard, American politician (b. 1640)
- November 10 – Gédéon Tallemant des Réaux, French writer (b. 1619)
- November 13
  - Mary Browne, courtier (b. 1593)
  - Joseph de la Vega, Jewish Hispano-Dutch merchant, poet, and philanthropist (b. 1650)
- November 14 – Christoph Bernhard, German composer (b. 1628)
- November 16 – Theodore Poulakis, Greek artist (b. 1622)
- November 18
  - Robert Holmes, British Royal Navy Admiral (b. 1622)
  - Christopher Nevile, English politician (b. 1631)
- November 19
  - Thomas Shadwell, English poet and playwright (b. 1642)
  - Prince Georg Friedrich of Waldeck, Dutch general and German field marshal (b. 1620)
- November 21 – Henry Powle, English politician (b. 1630)
- November 22 – Giovanni Battista Centurione, politician (b. 1603)
- November 26
  - Sir John Fowell, 3rd Baronet, English politician (b. 1665)
  - Edmund Ludlow, English politician, soldier and regicide (1617–92) (b. 1617)
- December 5
  - Jacques Bizard, Canadian politician (b. 1642)
  - Aldegonde Desmoulins, Belgian nun (b. 1611)
- December 6 – John Tyrrell, Royal Navy officer (b. 1646)
- December 7 – Richard Meggot, English churchman, Canon of Windsor and Dean of Winchester (b. 1632)
- December 9 – William Mountfort, English actor and dramatist (b. c. 1664)
- December 10 – John Russell, Anglo-American clergyman (b. 1626)
- December 13
  - Conyers Darcy, 2nd Earl of Holderness, English politician (b. 1622)
  - Henry Mildmay, English politician (b. 1619)
- December 15 – Georg Adam Struve, German judge (b. 1619)
- December 16 – Antonio Carneo, Italian painter (b. 1637)
- December 18 – Veit Ludwig von Seckendorff, German politician (b. 1626)
- December 24 – Maria Antonia of Austria, Archduchess of Austria (b. 1669)
