= Jean Le Noir =

Jean Le Noir may refer to:

- Jean Le Noir (theologian) (1622–1692), French theologian and canon lawyer
- Jean Le Noir (illuminator), French manuscript illuminator active in Paris between 1335 and 1380
