= Louis-Claude Danré de Blanzy =

French royal notary

Louis-Claude Danré de Blanzy (1710-???) was a French royal notary, seigneurial judge and the son of Charles Danré de Blanzy, a lawyer in the parliament of Paris, and Suzanne Morillon.

== See also ==
- André Souste
