= Ernst Dietrich, of Isenburg-Büdingen =

Ernst Dietrich of Ysenburg-Büdingen

Prince of Ysenburg and Büdingen
- Born: 30 August 1717; Büdingen
- Died: 26 December 1758 (aged 41); Büdingen
- Spouse: Countess Dorothea Wilhelmine of Ysenburg-Büdingen-Birstein
Names
- Ernst Dietrich
- House: House of Ysenburg and Büdingen
- Father: Ernst Casimir zu Ysenburg-Büdingen I
- Mother: Christine Eleonore of Stolberg-Gedern

Ernst Dietrich, of Ysenburg-Büdingen (30 August 1717 - 26 December 1758) was a German Count (Graf) from the House of Isenburg-Büdingen.

== Early life and marriage ==
Born on 30 August 1717, in Büdingen, the third child of Count Ernest Casimir I, of Ysenburg-Büdingen and Countess Christine Eleonore, of Stolberg-Gedern. Ernst married Princess Dorothea Wilhelmina Albertina, of Isenburg-Büdingen on 26 December 1758. Together the couple had three children.

- Christina Ernestina (26 June 1755 - 22 April 1756); died young.
- Ernst Casimir I (1757–25 February 1801) married Eleanore Augusta Amalie, Countess von Bentheim-Steinfurt; had issue.
- Dorothea Luisa Carolina (14 September 1758 - 24 March 1784) never married; had no issue.

Ernst was 41 when he died on 26 December 1758, in Büdingen.
