= Aldegonde Desmoulins =

Antoinette Desmoulins

Personal life
- Born: March 1, 1611 Mons, Belgium
- Died: December 5, 1692 (aged 81) Liège, Belgium
- Known for: literary, musical, architectural works

Religious life
- Religion: Christianity
- Order: Order of Saint Benedict
- Monastic name: Aldegonde Desmoulins
- Initiation: November 12, 1640

Antoinette Desmoulins, better known by her monastic name Sister Aldegonde Desmoulins, was a French Benedictine nun of the Abbaye de la Paix Notre-Dame de Liège (Abbey of Peace Notre-Dame, Liège).

== Biography ==
Desmoulins was born on 1 March 1611 in the city of Mons, France, to a local painter named Jean Desmoulins. According to a community register, she was both literate and capable artistically before her entry into the Benedictine Order. When she did join a nunnery, it was in Liège, rather than her hometown of Mons. There, she was received without the need for a dowry on account of her skills in artistic and intellectual abilities.

== Works ==
As a member of the Abbey of Peace, Desmoulins produced a wide array of artistic and musical works. Her work focused on the areas of writing, drawing, painting, and architecture. Musically, she wrote spiritual verses about past saints and composed hymns to be sung in local churches. Along with the other sisters, she painted on woodblocks and illuminated manuscripts. She also decorated liturgical vestments with gold and silk thread, both for use within the Abbey or for donation.

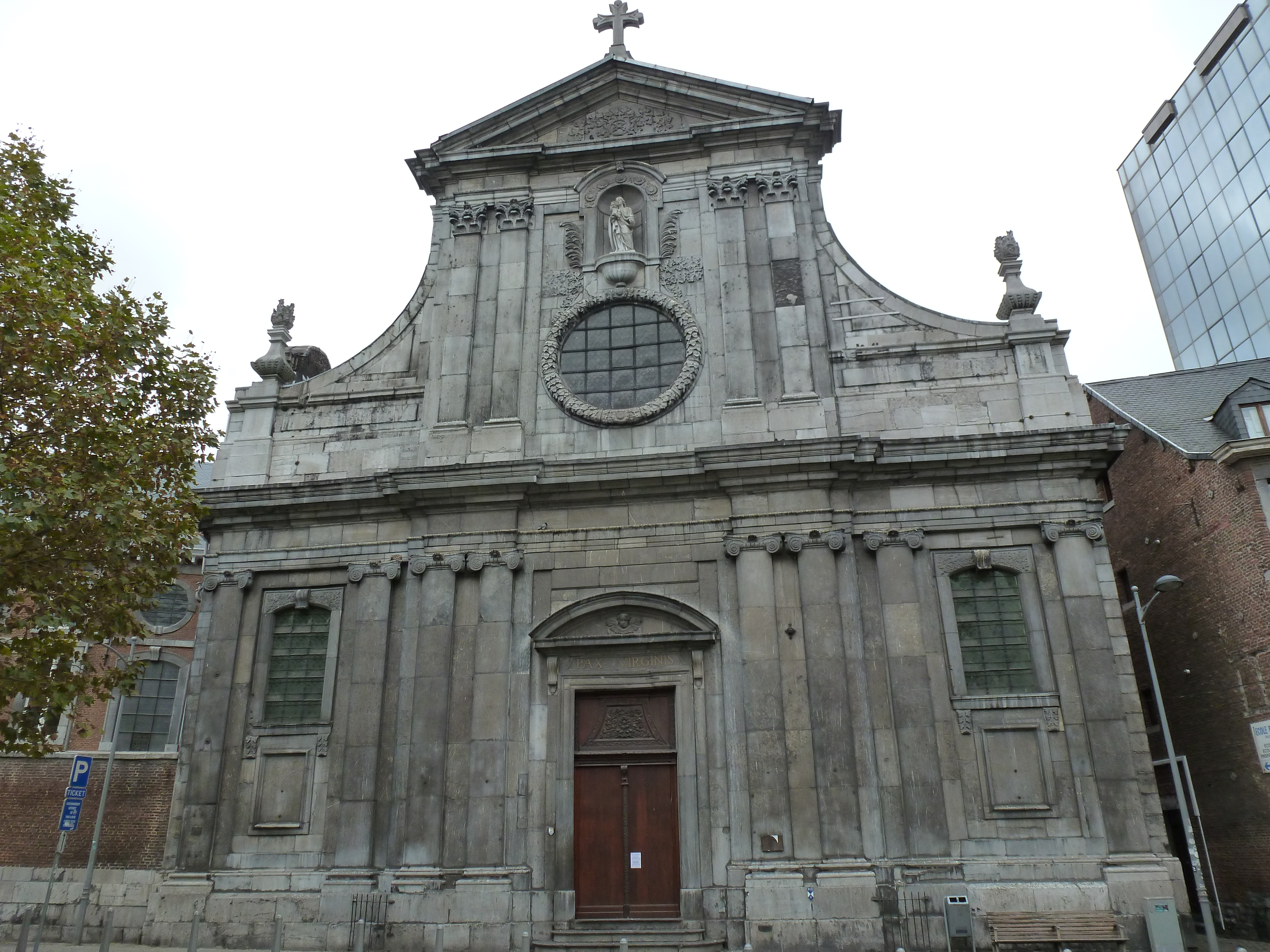
The facade of the Abbey of Peace, the design and construction of which was overseen by Aldegonde Desmoulins

Some time after being elected in 1657, Abbess of Notre-Dame de Liège Madame Counotte requested that Desmoulins draw up plans for a new church building. With the help of sculptor Arnold du Hontoir to decorate the church, Sister Desmoulins began preparing a design for the community church around 1675. She would go on to become the project manager of the undertaking, and the church was finished in 1690.
