= Jean-Michel-d'Astorg Aubarède =

Jean-Michel-d'Astorg Aubarède (1639 – 4 August 1692) was a canon regular and Vicar Capitular of the diocese of Pamiers.

== Biography ==
He was educated at Toulouse (France), entered the Seminary of Pamiers, and later joined the regulars, who formed the cathedral chapter of that diocese. After the death of the bishop, François Caulet, Aubarede was chosen vicar capitular.

As administrator of the diocese, he took up and carried on vigorously the resistance of Caulet to the royal demands in the matter of the droit de régale. He refused to recognize royal nominations to local ecclesiastical benefices, and excommunicated the canons appointed by the king, when they attempted to exercise their office. He was arrested by royal order, and imprisoned for six years at Caen, where he died.

Bernard Jungmann remarks (in Herder, K.L., I, 1567) that the Jansenist rigorism of Caulet and his clergy was partly responsible for their stubborn defiance of Louis XIV; they feared that the nominees of the king would not belong to their faction.
