= Johannes Maximus Stainer von Pleinfelden =

Most Reverend Johannes Maximus Stainer von Pleinfelden
- Auxiliary Bishop of Passau; Titular Bishop of Symbalia
- Church: Catholic Church
- Diocese: Diocese of Passau
- In office: 1610–1692

Orders
- Ordination: 1648
- Consecration: 14 Mar 1683

Personal details
- Born: 1610 Bamberg, Germany
- Died: 15 Oct 1692 (age 82) Passau, Germany

Johannes Maximus Stainer von Pleinfelden (1610–1692) was a Roman Catholic prelate who served as Auxiliary Bishop of Passau (1682–1692).

== Biography ==
Johannes Maximus Stainer von Pleinfelden was born in Bamberg, Germany in 1610 and ordained a priest in 1648. On 7 Dec 1682, he was appointed during the papacy of Pope Innocent XI as Auxiliary Bishop of Passau and Titular Bishop of Selymbria. On 14 Mar 1683, he was consecrated bishop. He served as Auxiliary Bishop of Passau until his death on 15 Oct 1692. While bishop, he was the principal co-consecrator of Sigmund Ignaz von Wolkenstein-Trostburg, Bishop of Chiemsee (1689).
