= Louis Guy Henri de Valori =

French diplomat

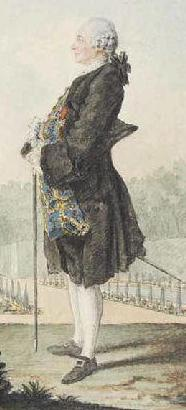
Portrait by Louis Carrogis Carmontelle, 1760–1765

Louis Guy Henri, Marquis de Valori, (11 November 1692 in Menen – October 1774) was a French diplomat and aristocrat, who served as a general under Louis XV. He served as French ambassador at the courts of Frederick William I of Prussia and Frederick the Great.

== List of works ==
- Valori, Guy Louis Henri marquis de (1820). Mémoires des négociations du marquis de Valori ...: Accompagnés d'un recueil de lettres de Frédéric-le-Grand, des princes ses frères, de Voltaire, et des plus illustres personnages du XVIIIe siècle; précédés d'une notice historique sur la vie de l'auteur (in French). Firmin Didot, père et fils.
