= Jean Calmette =

Jean Calmette (5 April 1693, Rodez, France - February 1740, Chikkaballapur, India) was a French Jesuit missionary and an Indologist assigned in South India.

== Bibliography ==
=== Primary ===
- Satyavedasarasamgraha: A Short Exposition of the Essentials of the True Religion. Ed. J. Aelen. Nellore: St John's Press, 1931.
- Satyavedasarasamgraha. In The Indian Christiad: A Concise Anthology of Didactic and *Devotional Literature in Early Church Sanskrit, ed. A. Amaladass and R. Young. Anand: Gujarat Sahitya Prakash, 1995. 105-146.
- Tattvagrantha slokamulu. 2nd ed. [Reprinting, in Canarese characters, only part of the prayers, since several of them 'are obscure and have a defective meaning.'] Bangalore Catholic Mission Press, 1878.
- Tattvagrantha slokamulu. Nellore: St John's Press, 1931.
- Satya Veda Sara Sangraham. Ed. P. Rayana, SJ. Shembaganur, 1979.
- Common Prayers. In The Indian Christiad: A Concise Anthology of Didactic and Devotional Literature in Early Church Sanskrit, ed. A. Amaladass and R. Young. Anand: Gujarat Sahitya Prakash, 1995. 147-195.

=== Secondary ===
- Bach, Julien. Le Pere Calmete et les Missionaires Indianistes. Paris: Joseph Albanel, 1868.
- Dahmen, Pierre. "Exraits de lettres inedites du P. Jean Calmette, S.J., missionaire dans l'Inde." Revue d'histoire des missions 1 (1934) 109-125.
- Della Casa, Torino. "Il P. Calmette e le sue conoscenze indologiche." Studia Indologica: Festschrift fur Willibald Kirfel. Ed. Otto Spies. Bonn: Selbstverlag des Orientalischen Seminars, 1955. 53-64.
- Dahlmann, Joseph. "Die Sprachkunde und die Missionen. Ein Beitrag zur Charakteristik der ältern katholischen Missionsthätigkeit (1500-1800)". Freiburg im Breisgau / St. Louis Mo. [etc.]: Herder, 1891, trad. anglaise partielle "Missionary pioneers and Indian languages." Trichinopoly: Catholic Truth Society of India, 1940 (cf. Rays Supplement, November 1941).
- Dharampal, G. "La religion des Malabars: : Tessier de Quéralay et la contribution des missionnaires européens à la naissance de l'indianisme", Immensee: Nouvelle Revue de science missionnaire, 1982
