= Jean-François Du Bellay du Resnel =

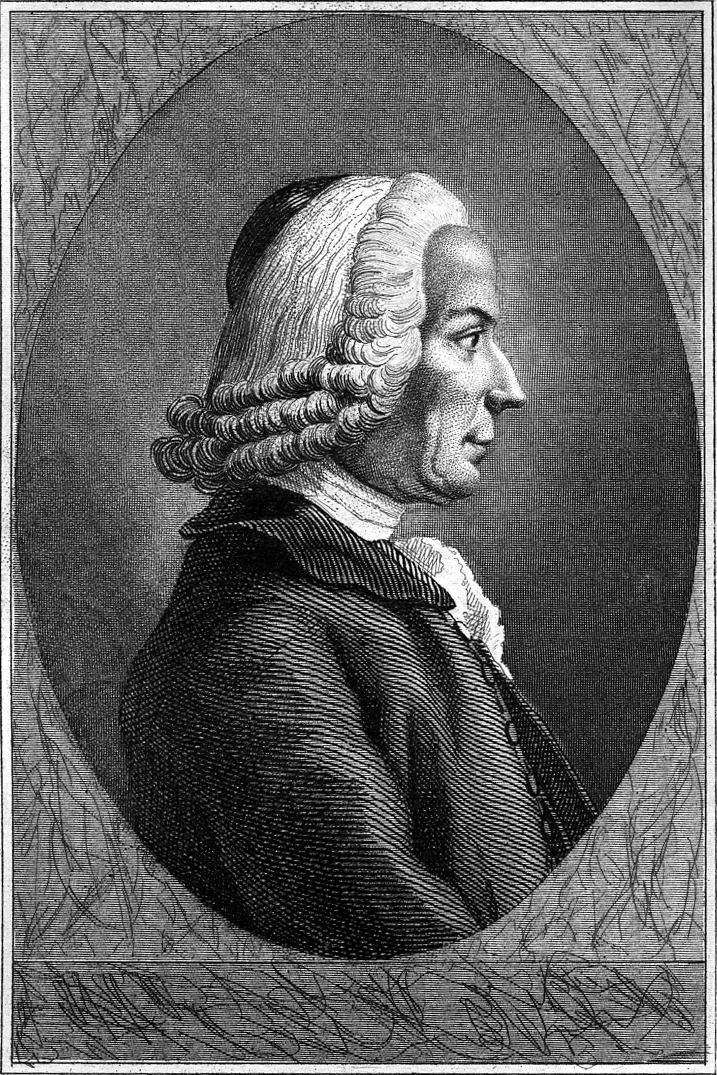
Jean-François Du Bellay du Resnel

Jean-François Du Resnel du Bellay, Cong.Orat (29 June 1692, Rouen – 25 February 1761, Paris), was a French ecclesiastic, writer and translator.

== Works ==
- Essai sur la Critique, poème traduit de l’anglois de M. Pope, avec un discours et des remarques (1730)
- Panégyrique de Saint Louis (1732)
- Essai sur l’homme, par M. Pope. Traduit de l’anglois (1737) Online text
- Les Principes de la morale et du goût en deux poëmes, traduits de l’Anglois de M. Pope (1737) Online text
