= Antonio Sandini =

Italian ecclesiastical historian

- Born: 1 July 1692
- Died: 23 February 1751; Padua
- Occupations: Historian, librarian

Antonio Sandini (30 June 1692 – 23 February 1751, Padua, Italy) was an Italian ecclesiastical historian.

Through the interest of his bishop, cardinal Rezzonico (later pope Clement XIII), Sandini became a librarian and professor of ecclesiastical history at the seminary at Padua.

He is known principally by his Vitae Pontificum Romanorum (Ferrara, 1748; reprinted under the title Basis Historiae Ecclesiasticae). He also wrote Historiae Familiae Sacrae, Hist. SS. Apostolorum, Disputationes XX ex. Hist. Eccles., and Dissertations in Defence of his Hist. Fam. Sac.

== Bibliography ==
This article incorporates public domain material from McClintock, John; Strong, James (1867–1887). Cyclopædia of Biblical, Theological and Ecclesiastical Literature. Harper and Brothers.
