= Christine Eleonore of Stolberg-Gedern =

German noblewoman

Christine Eleonore of Mecklenburg-Güstrow
- Born: 12 September 1692; Gedern
- Died: 30 January 1745 (aged 52); Büdingen
- Spouse: Ernst Casimir of Isenburg-Büdingen
- Father: Louis Christian, Count of Stolberg-Gedern
- Mother: Christine of Mecklenburg-Güstrow

Christine Eleonore of Stolberg-Gedern (12 September 1692 - 30 January 1745) was a German noblewoman of the House of Stolberg and by marriage a Countess of Isenburg-Büdingen.

== Early life and marriage ==
Christine Eleonore was born on 12 September 1692 as the eleventh child of Christine of Mecklenburg-Güstrow and Louis Christian, Count of Stolberg-Gedern.

Christine married Ernst Casimir of Isenburg-Büdingen on 8 August 1708 in Büdingen. Four of the couple's six children survived to adulthood:

	Birth	Death	Spouse	Children
Countess Magdalena Louise Christine of Isenburg-Büdingen	8 July 1709	6 December 1709	N/A	N/A
Count Ludwig Casimir II of Isenburg-Büdingen	25 August 1710	15 December 1775	Auguste Friederike of Stolberg-Wernigerode	Had issue;
Count Georg August of Isenburg-Büdingen	19 February 1713	10 August 1713	N/A	N/A
Count Gustav Friedrich of Isenburg	7 August 1715	12 February 1768	Princess Dorothea Benedicta von Reventlow	Had issue;
Count Ernst Dietrich of Isenburg	30 October 1717	26 December 1758	Princess Dorothea Wilhelmina Albertine of Isenburg	Had issue;
Countess Auguste Caroline of Isenburg-Büdingen	17 July 1722	30 November 1758	Ferdinand Casimir of Dienburg-Baechtersbach	Had issue;

Christine was only 52 years old when she died on 30 January 1745 in Büdingen, where she was buried at the Familienfriedhof Ysenburg-Büdingen.
