= Juan Manuel de la Puente =

Spanish baroque composer

Juan Manuel de la Puente (8 August 1692 - 19 December 1753) was a Spanish baroque composer. He was maestro de capilla at Jaén Cathedral from 1711 till his death in 1753.

== Works and recording ==
- Juan Manuel De La Puente, Al Ayre Español, Eduardo López Banzo - Cantatas Y Villancicos Documentos Sonoros del Patrimonio Musical de Andalucía DS 0102 1992
- Juan Manuel De La Puente, Espacios sonoros en la Catedral de Jaén. OBS reissued as Juan Manuel de la Puente Music at the Cathedral of Jaén Orquesta Barroca de Sevilla Coro Vandalia Enrico Onofri, Accent
