= Antoine Thiout =

Eighteenth-century clockmaker from France

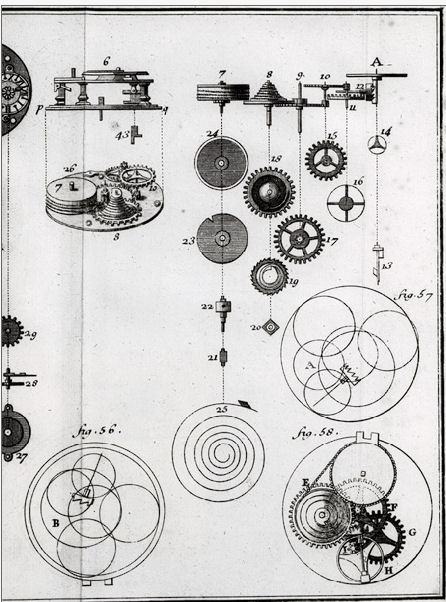
Antoine Thiout engraving in Traité de l'horlogerie mechanique et pratique, 1741.

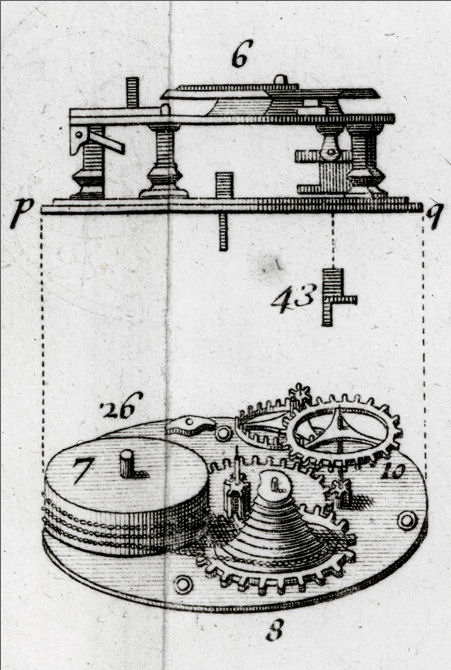
Detail of a pocket watch mechanism.

Antoine Thiout the elder (Paris, 1692–1767) was a French clockmaker. He wrote Traité de l'horlogerie mechanique et pratique (Paris, 1741), a treatise on clockmaking which was widely read in his time. His plates describe clock and watch mechanisms which were often used in 18th century timepieces: for example a verge escapement powered by a spring encased in a barrel, and a regulation based on a cone-shaped fusee.

== Works ==
- Traité de l'horlogerie, méchanique et pratique (in French). Vol. 1. Paris: Charles Moette. 1741.
- Traité de l'horlogerie, méchanique et pratique (in French). Vol. 2. Paris: Charles Moette. 1741.
