= Joshua Brooksbank =

Joshua Brooksbank (22 March 1642 – 5 February 1692) was a Church of Ireland priest in Ireland during the late seventeenth century.

Brooksbank was born at Eccleshill, West Yorkshire and educated at Christ's College, Cambridge. He graduated BA in 1664 and MA in 1667. He was ordained deacon by Matthew Wren the Bishop of Ely on 22 September 1664; and priest by William Fuller the Bishop of Lincoln on 12 March 1867. He was Precentor of Limerick Cathedral from 1689 until 1690; and Dean of Clonfert from 1670 until his death.
