= Giuseppe Ginanni =

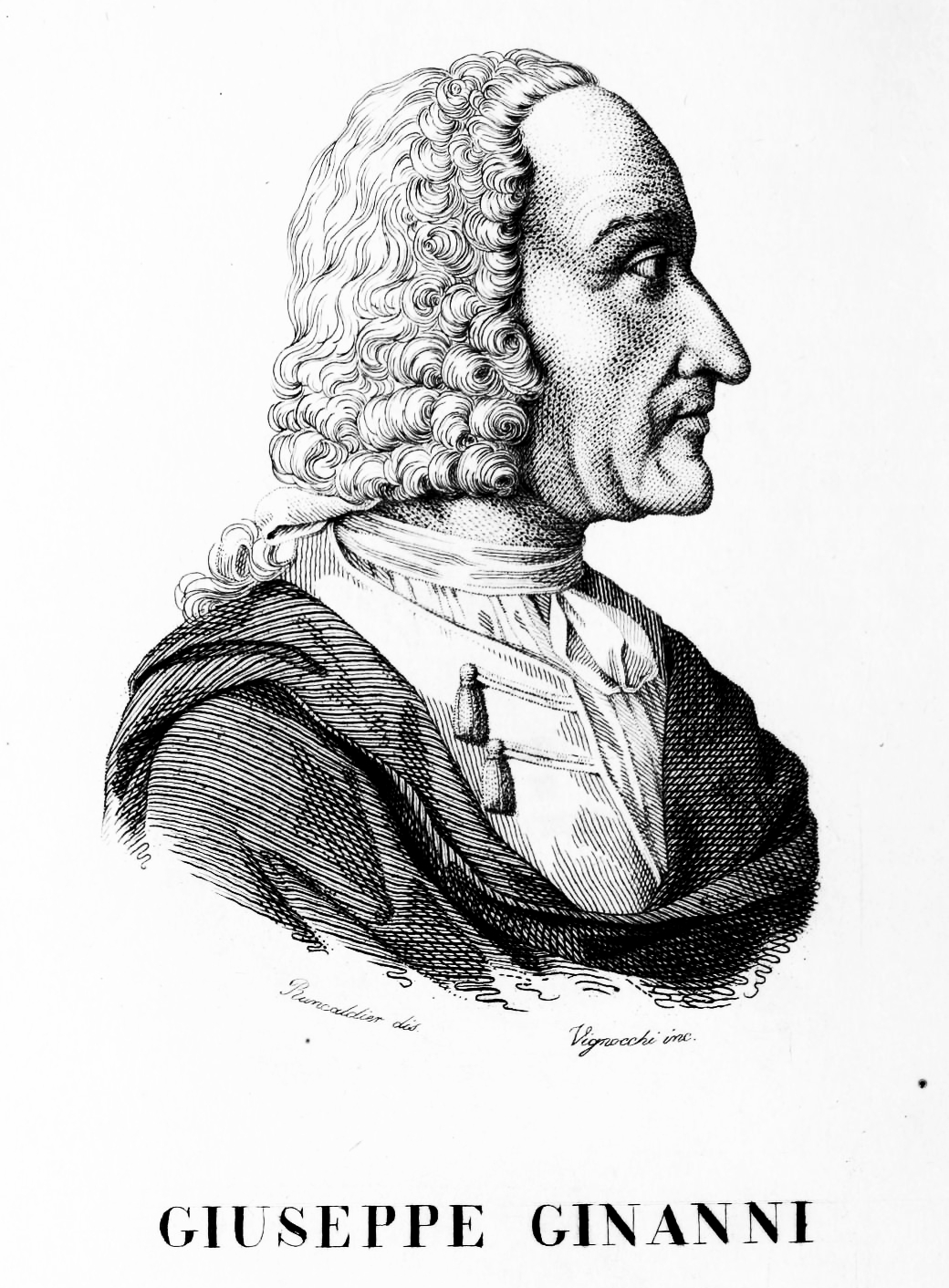

Count Giuseppe Ginanni or Zinanni (Italian pronunciation: [dʒuˈzɛppe dʒiˈnanni, dziˈnanni]; 7 November 1692 in Ravenna, Papal States – 23 October 1753 in Ravenna) was an Italian naturalist.

== Biography ==
Ginanni wrote the first book entirely devoted to the eggs and nests of birds Delle uova e dei nidi degli uccelli (Venice, 1737), illustrated with 34 black and white plates. Birds are divided into three groups: raptorial land birds (Uccelli terrestri rapaci), other land birds (Uccelli terrestri non rapaci), and waterbirds (Uccelli aquatici). Each oological plate illustrated from one to nine eggs representing 106 species altogether. The specimens illustrated are from Ginanni's own museum piccolo Museo di cose naturali. He later published a book on snails and another on grasshoppers (Osservazioni giornali sopra le Cavallette. impr. cum libro ejus).

== Sources ==
- Cesare Conci and Roberto Poggi (1996), Iconography of Italian entomologists, with essential biographical data. Memorie della Società Entomologica Italiana, 75 : 159–382. (ISSN 0037-8747)

== Notes and references ==
- Jean Anker (1938). Bird Books and Bird Art. An Outline of the Literary History and Iconography of Descriptive Ornithology Levin & Munksgaard (Copenaghen).
