= William Bentney =

English Jesuit priest

William Bentney, alias Bennet, (1609 – 30 October 1692) was an English Jesuit priest during the Penal laws.

== Life ==
Bentney was born in Cheshire. He entered the Society of Jesus on 7 September 1630 and was sent to the English missions in 1640. He laboured there with great zeal and success for forty-two years. A victim of the Oates Plot, he was betrayed and arrested at the instigation of a nobleman to whose sisters he was administering the sacraments, and was taken to the Leicester jail. No one in those parts being willing to bear witness against him, being so universally esteemed, Bentney was at once transferred to Derby, where he was tried and sentenced to death at the Spring Assizes of 1682. His execution was delayed for unknown reasons and on the accession of James II he was released. After the Glorious Revolution in 1688, however, he was rearrested, tried and condemned, but the sentence remained suspended, and in 1692 he died in Leicester jail at the age of 82 or 83. He is buried near the maternity block of Leicester Royal Infirmary with a memorial plaque on its wall noting the fact.
