= André Souste =

Canadian businessman and royal notary

André Souste (bap. 4 April 1692 – 12 February 1776) was a businessman and royal notary in New France.

Souste came to New France from France in 1719. He was originally involved in a stocking factory which was his trade from his time in France. In 1722 he left this business to his partner and became a general merchant in Montreal. By 1740 his success and the influence of his brother-in-law Louis-Claude Danré de Blanzy combined to start a career as a notary. With his growth in this field his influence within the judicial circle of the colony was assured.
