= Paul Colomiès =

French Huguenot librarian and scholar

Paul Colomiès or Columesius (1638–1692) was a French Huguenot librarian and scholar. He is best known for his work Gallia Orientalis, a biographical dictionary of French Christian Hebraists.

== Life ==
He was born at La Rochelle, Aunis on 2 December 1638. His father, Jean, was a doctor of repute; his grandfather, a minister of the reformed religion, was descended from a family of Béarn, settled in La Rochelle. He was sent at the age of sixteen to the Academy of Saumur for courses in philosophy and history. Louis Cappel taught him Hebrew.

He went to Paris in 1664, and became acquainted with Isaac Vossius, who took him to Holland. Here he lived twelve months and brought out Gallia Orientalis (1665), his first work, dealing with the lives and writings of Frenchmen who had distinguished themselves in Hebrew and oriental studies. It covered 152 scholars, concentrating on those with competence in Hebrew, and included both Catholics and Protestant. The work was dedicated to Samuel Bochart. The original project included Belgian, German, English, and other sections; Italia et Hispania Orientalis was a posthumous publication.

He returned to La Rochelle, where he remained until 1681, and wrote several books. He then came to England, visited Vossius, who had been a resident since 1670, and had become canon of Windsor, and he obtained the post of reader in the French Anglican church established by Peter Allix. Vossius introduced him to William Sancroft, who collated him (after the revocation of the Edict of Nantes in 1685), to the rectory of Eynesford in Kent on 18 November 1687, having previously made him a librarian (perhaps assistant to Henry Wharton, recruited by Sancroft at the same period) at Lambeth Palace. He retired on the deprivation of Sancroft in 1690, and Wharton still retained the office. He was naturalised in 1688. While in England he published works which were heavily criticized by Pierre Jurieu and others. He was on the point of going to Germany to become librarian to Christian Albert, Duke of Holstein-Gottorp when illness overtook him. He died in London 4 January 1692, aged 54, and was buried in the churchyard of St. Martin's-in-the-Fields.
