= David Lloyd (biographer) =

David Lloyd (28 September 1635 – 16 February 1692) was an English biographer.

== Life and career ==
David Lloyd, son of Hugh Lloyd, was born at Pant Mawr, in the parish of Trawsfynydd, Merionethshire, on 28 September 1635, and was educated at Ruthin School in Denbighshire.

In 1653 he became a servitor of Merton College, Oxford, where he discharged the duties of janitor. He graduated B.A. 30 Jan. 1656–7 from Oriel College, Oxford. The warden and fellows of Merton College presented him to the rectory of Ibstone, Oxfordshire, in May 1658, and he commenced M.A. 4 July 1659. Resigning his rectory in 1659, he came to London and was appointed reader in the Charterhouse School under Dr. Timothy Thurscross. About 1663 he suffered six months' imprisonment at the suit of the Earl of Bridgewater, who resented Lloyd's publication of a work describing the late countess's virtues under the title The Countess of Bridgewater's Ghost, London, 1663. Subsequently, he became chaplain to Dr. Isaac Barrow, bishop of St. Asaph, who gave him several preferments in that diocese and collated him to a canonry. On 14 Aug. 1671 he was instituted to the vicarage of Abergele, Denbighshire, which he exchanged in 1672 for that of Northop, Flintshire, where he was also master of the free school. He was also rector of Llanddulas, Denbighshire, in 1672. His health failed, and he retired to Pant Mawr, where he died on 16 Feb. 1691–2 aged 56. He was buried at Trawsfynydd.

== Principal works ==
- The Statesmen and Favourites of England since the Reformation, London, 1665 and 1670, 8vo. A reprint of the work appeared under the title of State Worthies in 2 vols. London, 1766, 8vo, under the editorship of Sir Charles Whitworth, who added the characters of the sovereigns of England, and sought to counteract the effect of Lloyd's extravagant eulogies of the royalists by introducing extracts from Lord Herbert, Paul de Rapin, and other writers.
- Memoires of the Lives, Actions, Sufferings, and Deaths of those Noble, Reverend, and Excellent Personages that suffered by Death, Sequestration, Decimation, and otherwise for the Protestant Religion and the great Principle thereof, Allegiance to their Soveraigne, in our late Intestine Wars, from 1637 to 1660, and from thence continued to 1666. With the Life and Martyrdom of King Charles I, London, 1668, fol., and also with a new title dated 1677. Prefixed is a frontispiece containing portraits. This work, embodying much that had already appeared in Lloyd's Statesmen, is of slight historical or biographical value. Wood says that the book, "wherein are almost as many errors as lines", gained for Lloyd "not only the character of a most impudent plagiary, but a false writer and meer scribbler". Bishop Humphreys relates that Lloyd himself, in his later years, "would express no great esteem of his youthful performances"

== Other works ==
- Modern Policy Compleated, or the Publick Actions and Councels, both civil and military, of his Excellency the Lord General Monck, under the General Revolutions since 1639 to 1660, London, 1660, 8vo. The running title of this work is Modern Policy, the Second Part.
- Εἰκὼν Βασιλική, or the true Pourtraicture of his Sacred Majesty Charles the II. In three Books. Beginning from his Birth 1630 unto this present year 1660. Wherein is interwoven a Compleat History of the High-born Dukes of York and Glocester, London, 1660, 8vo, a work to be distinguished from the better-known book respecting Charles I. (see John Gauden, Eikon Basilike).
- Cabala: or the History of Conventicles unvail'd: in an Historical Account of the Principles and Practices of the Nonconformists. … With an Appendix of cxx. Plots against the present Government that have been defeated, London, 1664, 4to, published under the pseudonym of "Oliver Foulis".
- The Worthies of the World, abridged from Plutarch, London, 1665, 8vo.
- Dying and Dead Mens Living Words, or fair Warnings to a careless World, London, 1665 and 1682, 12mo, being a collection of sayings by great men in all ages.
- Wonders no Miracles: or Mr. Valentine Greatrakes's Gift of Healing examined (anon.), London, 1666, 4to.
