= Jean Le Noir (theologian) =

French theologian and canon lawyer

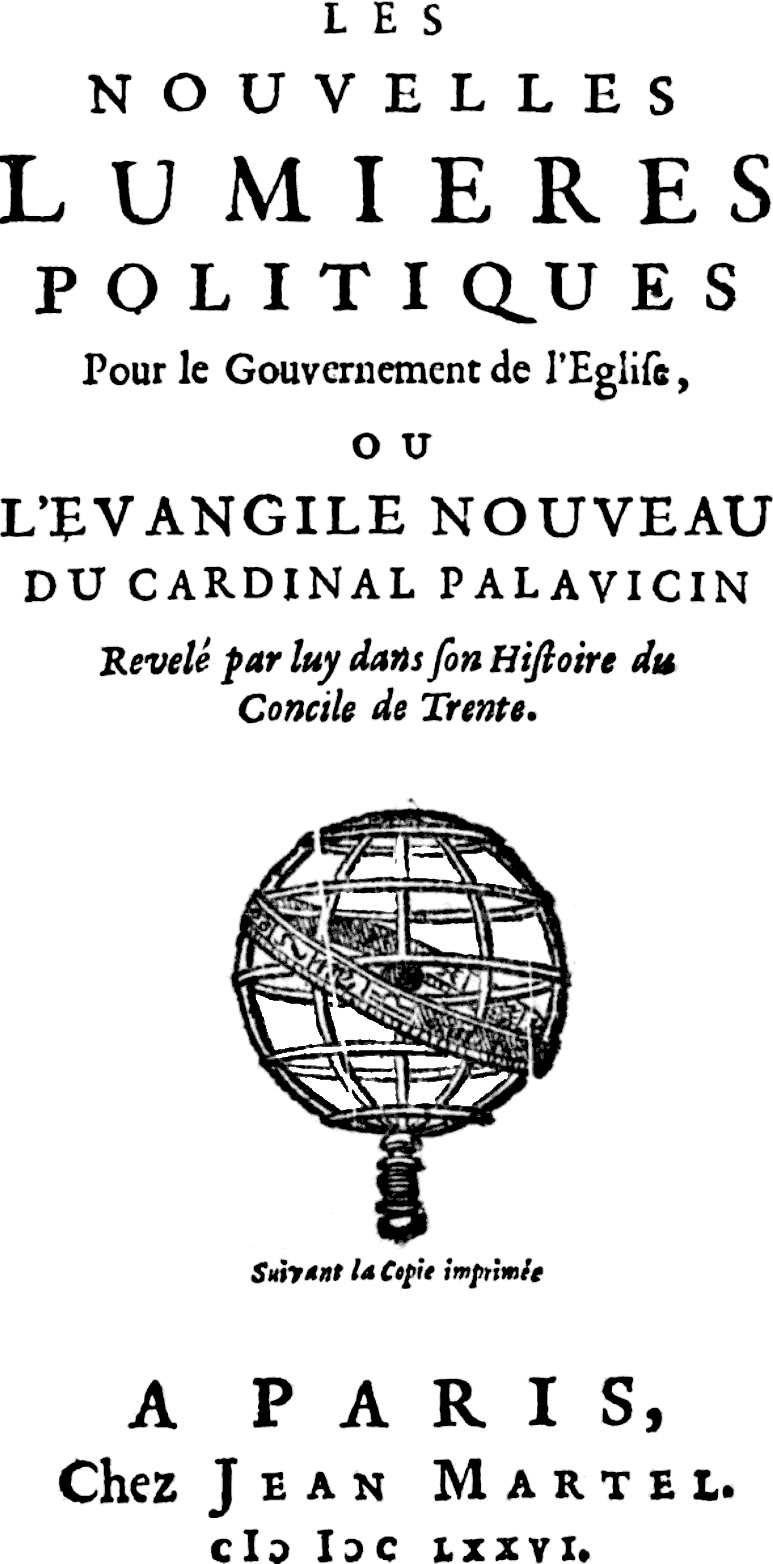
Title page of Le Noir's Les nouvelles lumières politiques pour le gouvernement de l'Église.

Jean Le Noir (1622, Alençon - 22 April 1692, in prison, in the château de Nantes) was a French theologian and canon lawyer.

== Selected works ==
- Les nouvelles lumières politiques pour le gouvernement de l'Eglise, ou l'Evangile nouveau du cardinal Palavicin. Revelé par luy dans son Histoire du Concile de Trente (in French). 1676.
