= 1619 =

1619 in various calendars
- Gregorian calendar: 1619; MDCXIX
- Ab urbe condita: 2372
- Armenian calendar: 1068; ԹՎ ՌԿԸ
- Assyrian calendar: 6369
- Balinese saka calendar: 1540–1541
- Bengali calendar: 1025–1026
- Berber calendar: 2569
- English Regnal year: 16 Ja. 1 – 17 Ja. 1
- Buddhist calendar: 2163
- Burmese calendar: 981
- Byzantine calendar: 7127–7128
- Chinese calendar: 戊午年 (Earth Horse); 4316 or 4109 — to — 己未年 (Earth Goat); 4317 or 4110
- Coptic calendar: 1335–1336
- Discordian calendar: 2785
- Ethiopian calendar: 1611–1612
- Hebrew calendar: 5379–5380
- Hindu calendars
- Vikram Samvat: 1675–1676
- Shaka Samvat: 1540–1541
- Kali Yuga: 4719–4720
- Holocene calendar: 11619
- Igbo calendar: 619–620
- Iranian calendar: 997–998
- Islamic calendar: 1028–1029
- Japanese calendar: Genna 5 (元和５年)
- Javanese calendar: 1539–1540
- Julian calendar: Gregorian minus 10 days
- Korean calendar: 3952
- Minguo calendar: 293 before ROC 民前293年
- Nanakshahi calendar: 151
- Thai solar calendar: 2161–2162
- Tibetan calendar: ས་ཕོ་རྟ་ལོ་ (male Earth-Horse); 1745 or 1364 or 592 — to — ས་མོ་ལུག་ལོ་ (female Earth-Sheep); 1746 or 1365 or 593

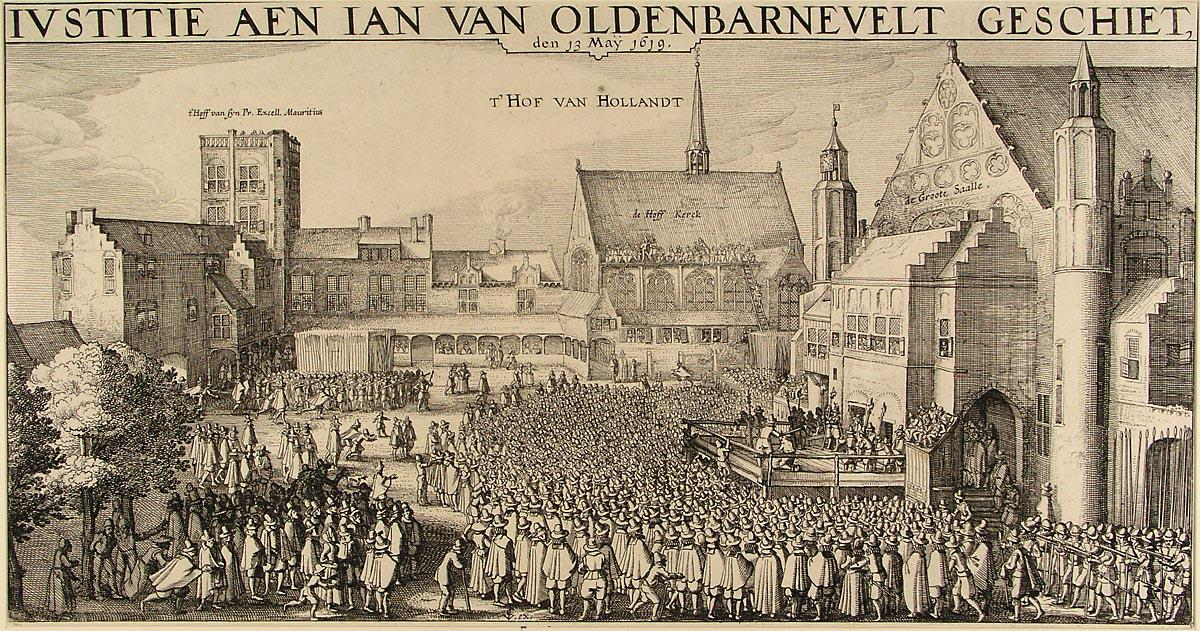
May 13: Grand pensionary Johan van Oldenbarnevelt is executed in The Hague

1619 (MDCXIX) was a common year starting on Tuesday of the Gregorian calendar and a common year starting on Friday of the Julian calendar, the 1619th year of the Common Era (CE) and Anno Domini (AD) designations, the 619th year of the 2nd millennium, the 19th year of the 17th century, and the 10th and last year of the 1610s decade. As of the start of 1619, the Gregorian calendar was 10 days ahead of the Julian calendar, which remained in localized use until 1923.

== Events ==
=== January– March ===
- January 12 – James I of England's Banqueting House, Whitehall in London is destroyed by fire. Inigo Jones is commissioned to design a replacement.
- February 14 – Earthquake flattens the town of Trujillo, Peru, killing hundreds in the town and causing landslides in the surrounding countryside killing hundreds more.
- March 20 – Matthias, Holy Roman Emperor dies, leaving the Holy Roman Empire without an official leader, to deal with the Bohemian Revolt.

=== April–June ===
- April 18 – Battle of Sarhu: Manchu leader Nurhaci is victorious over the Ming forces.
- April 30 – The Treaty of Angoulême ends the French civil war between Louis XIII and his mother, Marie de' Medici.
- May 8 – The Synod of Dort has its final meeting.
- May 13
  - Dutch statesman Johan van Oldenbarnevelt is executed in The Hague, after having been convicted of treason.
  - Anne of Denmark, queen consort of England, is buried at Westminster Abbey.
- May 30 – Jan Pieterszoon Coen, Governor General of the Dutch East Indies, conquers Jayakarta, and renames it Batavia.
- June 10 – Thirty Years' War – Battle of Sablat: Protestant forces are defeated.
- June 21 – Dulwich College founded by Edward Alleyn, in Dulwich, London.

=== July–September ===
- July 30 – In Jamestown, Virginia, the first English-speaking representative assembly in the Americas, the Virginia General Assembly (later named House of Burgesses), convenes for the first time.
- August 5 – Thirty Years' War: Battle of Věstonice – Bohemian forces defeat the Austrians.
- August 20 – A group of "twenty and odd" enslaved Africans, onboard the privateer ship White Lion (the first in the state of Virginia), are landed at Point Comfort in colonial Virginia.
- August 26 – Frederick V of the Palatinate is elected King of Bohemia by the states of the Bohemian Confederacy.
- August 28 – Ferdinand II, Archduke of Austria and King of Bohemia, is elected Holy Roman Emperor unanimously by the prince-electors.
- September 5 – In the course of a revolt against the Habsburg Empire, Prince Gabriel Bethlen of Transylvania (now in Romania) conquers Kassa (now Košice in Slovakia) with the help of George I Rákóczi.
- September 7 – Gaj Singh Rathore becomes the new Raja of Marwar (within the Mughal Empire) at Jodhpur in what is now the Indian state of Rajasthan, succeeding his father, Sur Singh.
- September 9 – The coronation of Ferdinand II takes place in Vienna.
- September 18 (7 Thout 1336 on the Coptic calendar) – Abba Yoannis El-Mallawany of Egypt becomes the new head of the Coptic Christian Church as Pope John XV of Alexandria succeeding the late Pope Mark V, who died on September 11.

=== October–December ===
- October 8 – Thirty Years' War – The Treaty of Munich is signed by Ferdinand II and Maximilian I, Elector of Bavaria.
- November 10 – While stationed along the Danube river with Bavarian troops, René Descartes, according to his biographer Adrien Baillet, has a series of dreams giving him the idea of applying the mathematical method to philosophy.
- November 16 – William Parker School, Hastings, England, is founded by the will of Reverend William Parker.
- November 23 – Thirty Years' War– Battle of Humenné: Polish Lisowczycy troops assist the Holy Roman Emperor by defeating a Transylvanian force, forcing Gabor Bethlen to raise his siege of Vienna.
- December 4 – Thirty-eight colonists from England disembark in Berkeley Hundred, Virginia from the Margaret of Bristol and have a day of celebration to give thanks to God, in what is considered by some historians to be the first Thanksgiving in the Americas.

=== Date unknown ===
- Jahangir grants a British mission important commercial concessions at Surat, on the west coast of India.
- Salé Rovers declare the port of Salé on the Barbary Coast to be the Republic of Salé, independent of the Sultan of Morocco, with the Dutch-born corsair Jan Janszoon as president.
- The Danish–Dutch whaling settlement of Smeerenburg is founded in Svalbard.
- An expedition in Sri Lanka, led by Filipe de Oliveira, deposes and executes the last Jaffna king (Cankili II), putting an end to the Jaffna Kingdom.
- A Spanish expedition sails around Tierra del Fuego, mapping the coast and discovering the Diego Ramírez Islands.

== Births ==
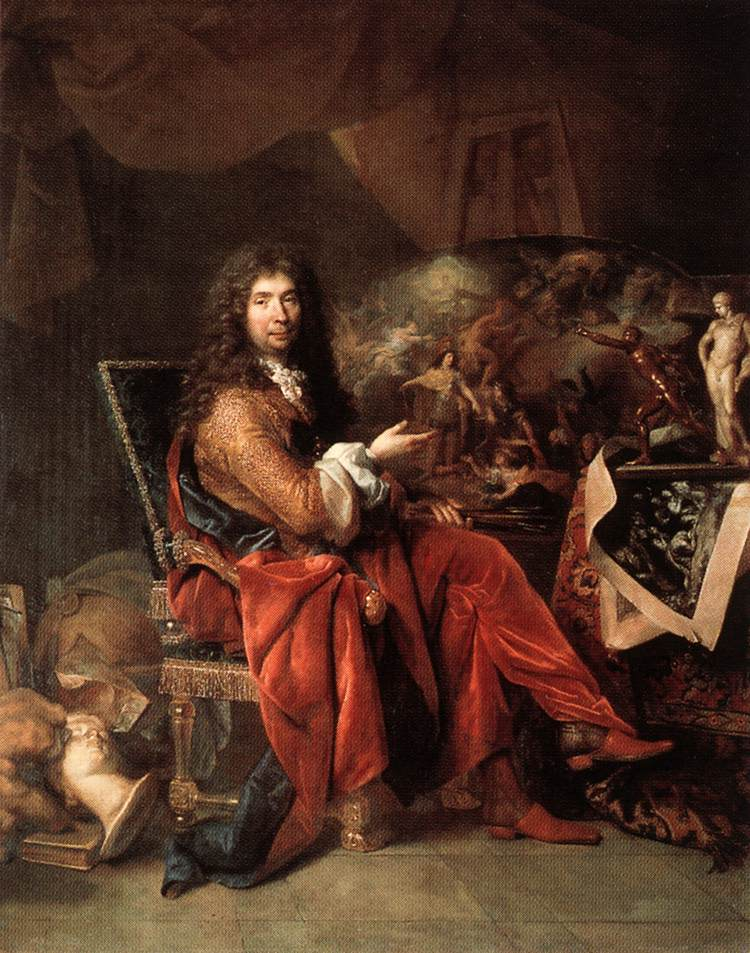
Charles Le Brun

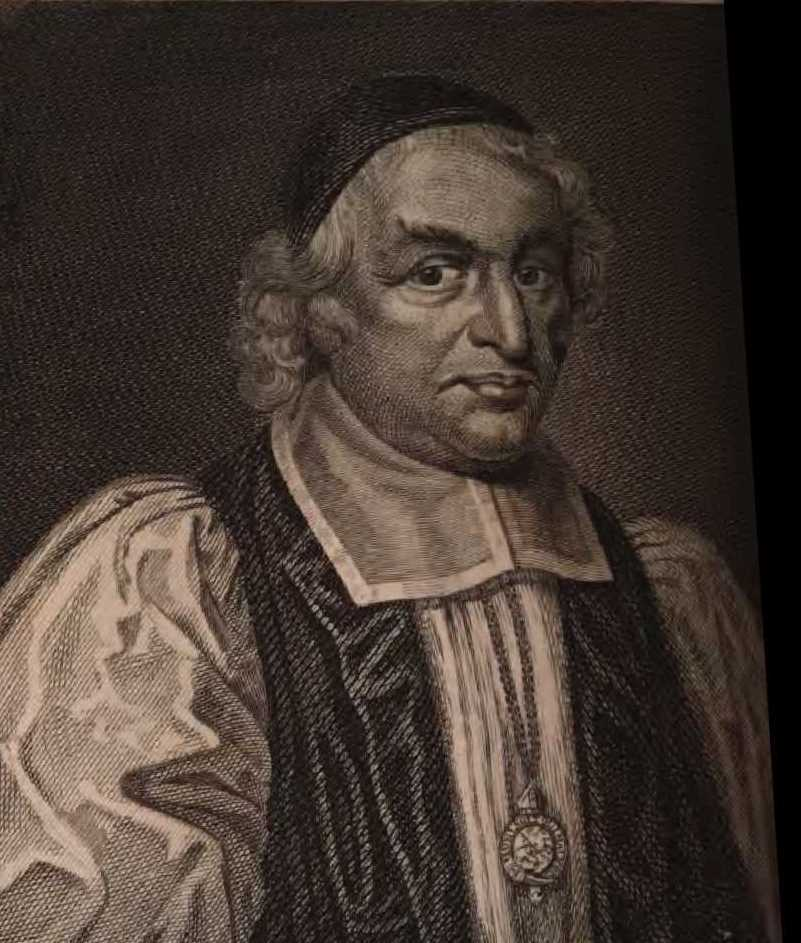
Peter Mews

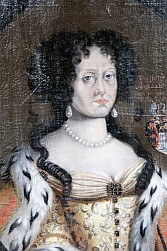
Anna Sophia I, Abbess of Quedlinburg

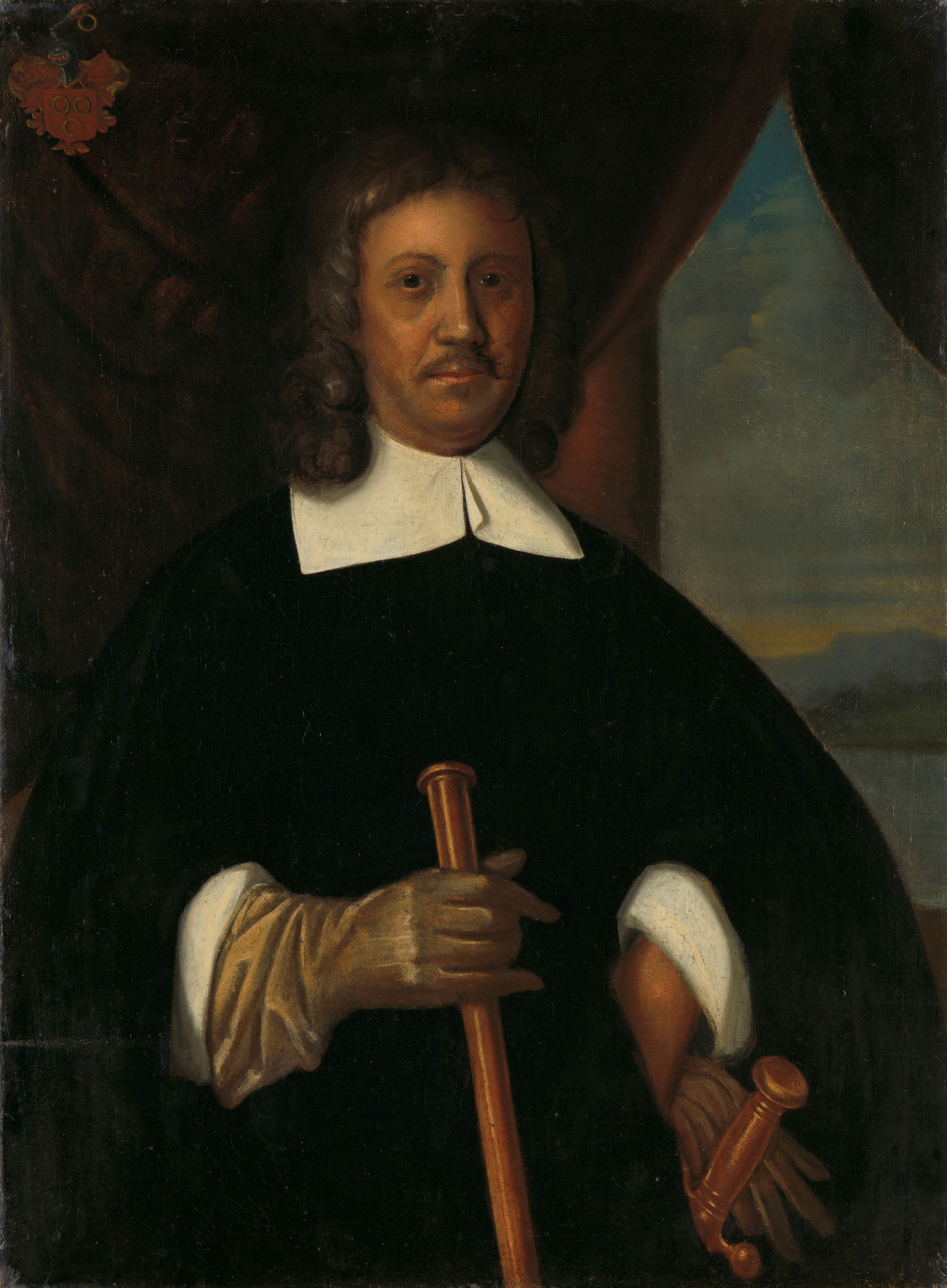
Jan van Riebeeck

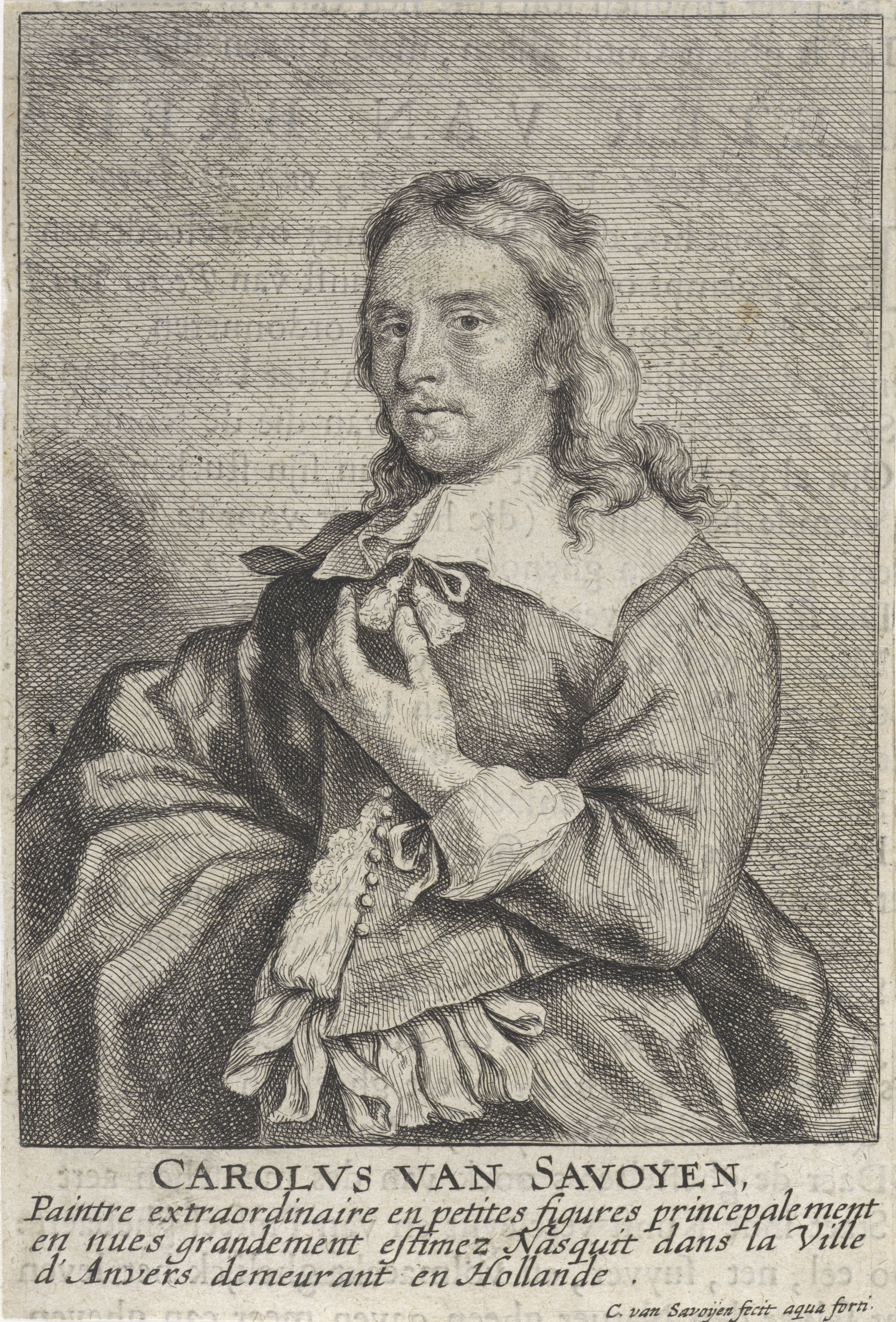
Carel van Savoyen

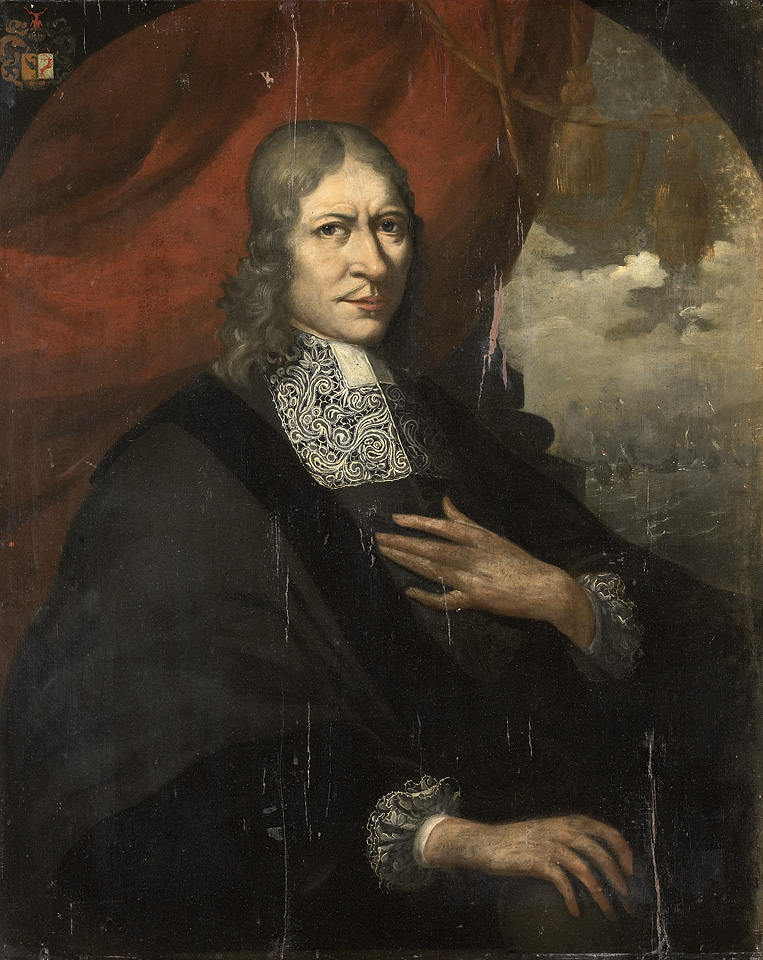
Rijcklof van Goens

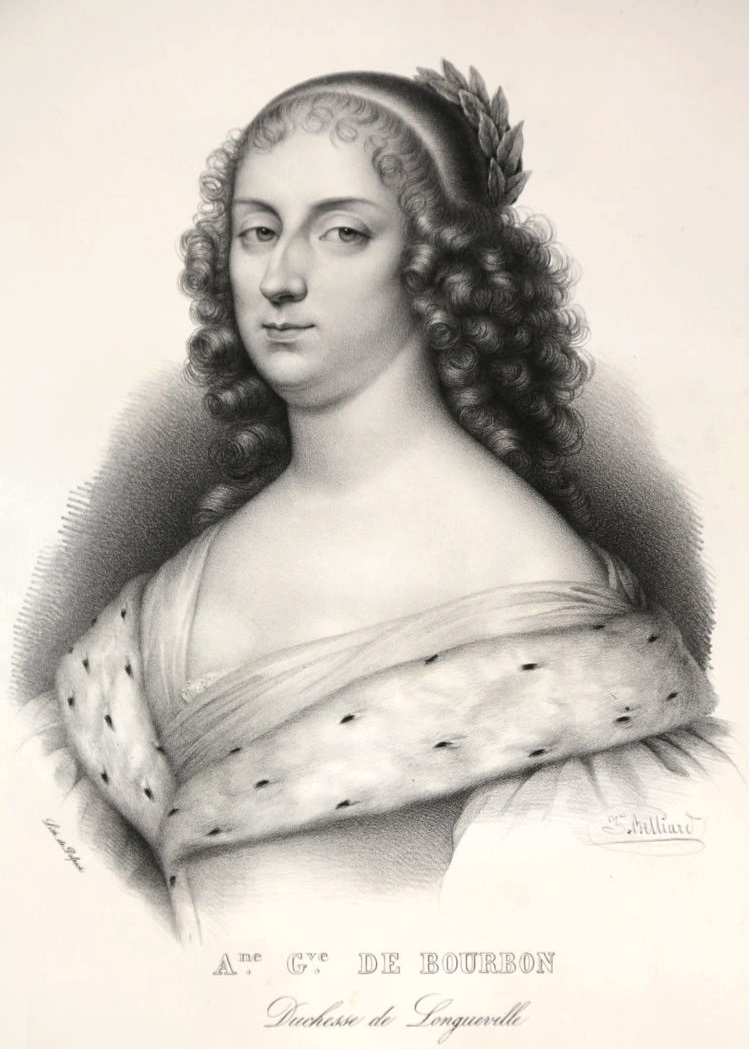
Anne Geneviève de Bourbon

=== January–March ===
- January 10 – Philip Sidney, 3rd Earl of Leicester, English politician (d. 1698)
- January 14
  - Thomas Archer, English politician (d. 1685)
  - Alexander von Spaen, German general (d. 1692)
- January 17 – Johanna Elisabeth of Nassau-Hadamar, by marriage Princess of Anhalt-Harzgerode (d. 1647)
- January 21
  - Anders Bording, Danish writer (d. 1677)
  - John Rashleigh, English politician (d. 1693)
- January 24 – Yamazaki Ansai, Japanese philosopher (d. 1682)
- January 30 – Michelangelo Ricci, Roman Catholic cardinal, mathematician (d. 1682)
- February 1 – Robert Phelips, English politician (d. 1707)
- February 2 – Walter Charleton, English natural philosopher (d. 1707)
- February 9 – Queen Inseon, Korean royal consort (d. 1674)
- February 15 – Tsugaru Nobuyoshi, Japanese daimyō (d. 1655)
- February 24
  - Robert Aske, merchant in the City of London (d. 1689)
  - Charles Le Brun, French painter and art theorist (d. 1690)
- February 26 – Francesco Morosini, Doge of Venice from 1688 to 1694 (d. 1694)
- February 28 – Giuseppe Felice Tosi, Italian composer (d. 1693)
- March 2 – Marcantonio Giustinian, 107th Doge of Venice (d. 1688)
- March 5 – Joseph Ames, English naval commander (d. 1695)
- March 6 – Cyrano de Bergerac, French soldier and poet (d. 1655)
- March 13 – Tobias Lohner, Austrian Jesuit theologian (d. 1697)
- March 15 – Jean Le Vacher, French Lazarist missionary and French consul (d. 1683)
- March 20 – Georg Albrecht, Margrave of Brandenburg-Bayreuth-Kulmbach (d. 1666)
- March 25 – Peter Mews, English Royalist theologian and bishop (d. 1706)
- March 28 – Maurice, Duke of Saxe-Zeitz (1657–1681) (d. 1681)

=== April–June ===
- April 2
  - Onofrio Gabrieli, Italian painter (d. 1706)
  - Anna Sophia I, Abbess of Quedlinburg, Dutch abbess (d. 1680)
- April 11 – Abraham van der Hulst, Dutch admiral (d. 1666)
- April 20 – Geoffrey Shakerley, English politician (d. 1696)
- April 21 – Jan van Riebeeck, Dutch founder of Cape Town (d. 1677)
- April 30 – Johannes Spilberg, Dutch painter (d. 1690)
- May
  - James Dalrymple, 1st Viscount of Stair, Scottish lawyer and statesman (d. 1695)
  - André Félibien, French court historian (d. 1695)
  - Andrew Ramsay, Lord Abbotshall, Scottish judge and politician (d. 1688)
- May 20 – Abiezer Coppe, English "Ranter" and pamphleteer (d. 1672)
- May 24 (bapt.) – Philips Wouwerman, Dutch painter (d. 1668)
- May 26 – King Pye Min of Burma (d. 1672)
- June 13 – Jan Victors, Dutch painter (d. 1676)
- June 14 (bapt.) – Sir Jeffrey Hudson, English court dwarf (d. 1682)
- June 24 – Rijcklof van Goens, Dutch colonial governor (d. 1682)

=== July–September ===
- July 3 – Hyojong of Joseon, 17th king of the Joseon Dynasty of Korea (1649–1659) (d. 1659)
- July 13 – Birgitta Durell, Swedish industrialist (d. 1683)
- July 27 – Sir Henry Felton, 2nd Baronet, English Member of Parliament (d. 1690)
- August 5 – Thomas Hall, English politician (d. 1667)
- August 6 – Barbara Strozzi, Italian singer and composer (d. 1677)
- August 7 – Anna Catherine Constance Vasa, Polish princess, daughter of King Sigismund III Vasa (d. 1651)
- August 15
  - Francesco Maria Farnese, Italian Catholic cardinal (d. 1647)
  - Hubertus Quellinus, Flemish artist (d. 1687)
- August 21 – Sir John Borlase, 1st Baronet, English politician (d. 1672)
- August 28
  - Anne Geneviève de Bourbon, French princess who is remembered for her beauty and amours (d. 1679)
  - Louis Thomassin, French bishop and theologian (d. 1695)
- August 29 – Jean-Baptiste Colbert, French minister of finance (d. 1683)
- September 20 – Sophie Elisabeth Pentz, daughter of Christian IV of Denmark (d. 1657)
- September 21 – Sir John Wray, 3rd Baronet, English politician (d. 1664)

=== October–December ===
- October 8 – Philipp von Zesen, German poet (d. 1689)
- October 10
  - Josias Calmady, English Member of Parliament (d. 1683)
  - Princess Elisabeth Sophie of Saxe-Altenburg, German princess (d. 1680)
- October 14 – Sir John Bright, 1st Baronet, English politician (d. 1688)
- October 16 – Johann Friedrich König, German Lutheran theologian (d. 1664)
- October 18 – Jean Armand de Maillé-Brézé, French admiral (d. 1646)
- October 27 – Frederick Louis, Count Palatine of Zweibrücken (d. 1681)
- November 5 – Philips Koninck, Dutch painter (d. 1688)
- November 7 – Gédéon Tallemant des Réaux, French writer known for his Historiettes (d. 1692)
- November 14 – Thomas Howard, 3rd Earl of Berkshire, English politician, earl (d. 1706)
- November 25 – Henry Mildmay, English politician (d. 1692)
- December 10 – Thomas Dyke, English politician (d. 1669)
- December 13 – Andrij Savka, Lemko bandit (d. 1661)
- December 17 – Prince Rupert of the Rhine, Bohemian-born Royalist commander in the English Civil War (d. 1682)
- December 28 – Antoine Furetière, French writer (d. 1688)
- December 31
  - John Fitzjames, English politician (d. 1670)
  - Sylvester Maurus, Italian Jesuit theologian (d. 1687)

=== Date unknown ===
- Donald Cargill, Scottish Covenanter (d. 1681)
- Gu Mei, politically influential Chinese Gējì, poet and painter (d. 1664)
- Samuel Collins, English doctor and author (d. 1670)
- Francisco Fernández de la Cueva, 8th Duke of Alburquerque, Spanish military officer and viceroy (d. 1676)
- Willem Kalf, Dutch painter (d. 1693)
- Kumazawa Banzan, Japanese philosopher (d. 1691)
- Shalom Shabazi, Jewish Yemeni rabbi and poet (d. c. 1720)
- Wang Fuzhi, Chinese philosopher (d. 1692)

== Deaths ==
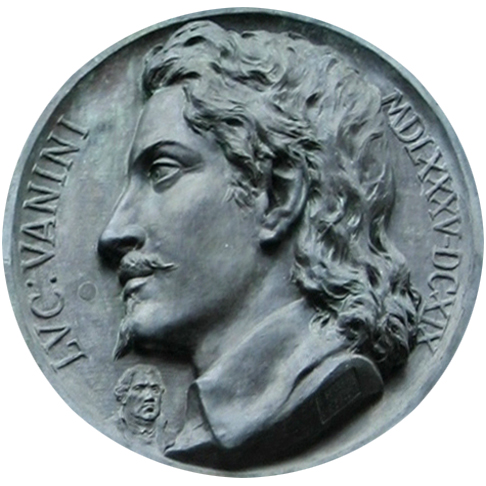
Lucilio Vanini

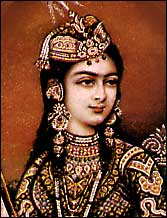
Taj Bibi Bilqis Makani

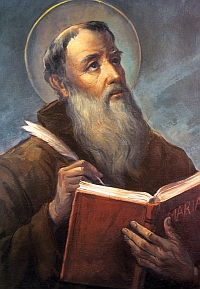
Lawrence of Brindisi

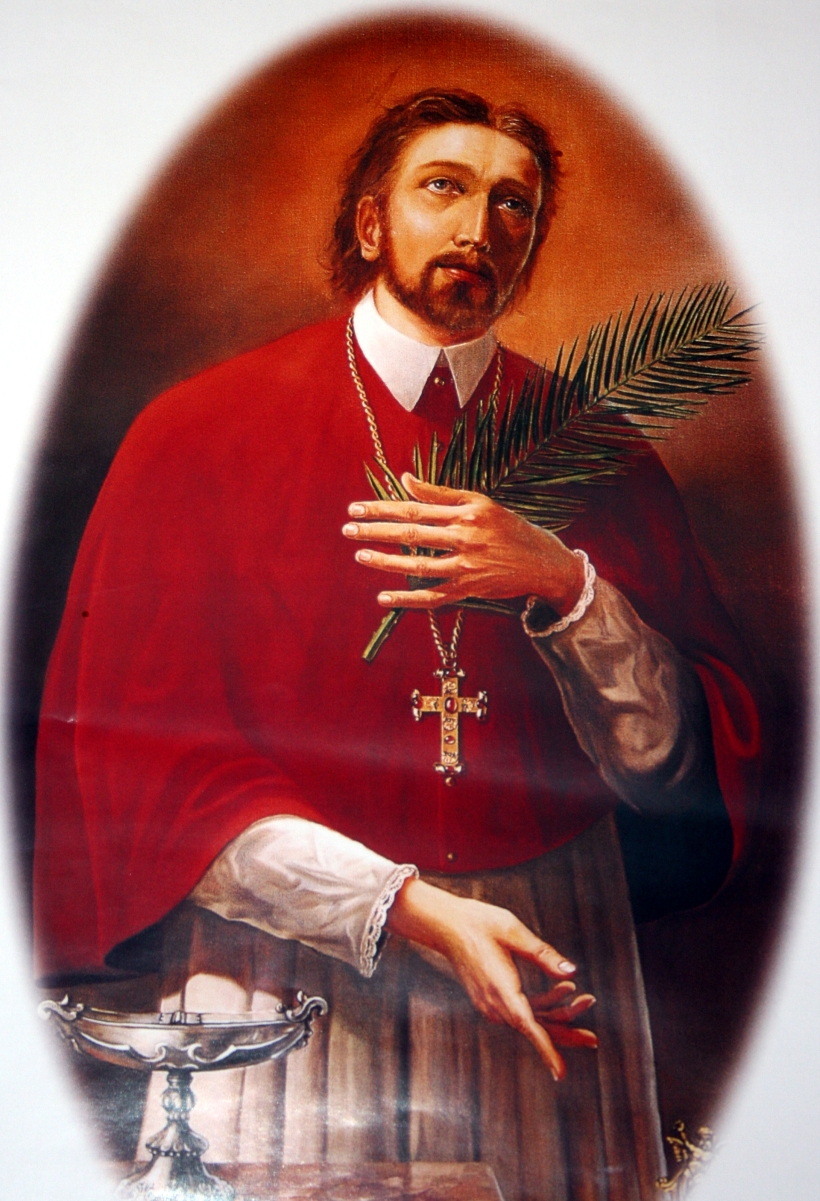
Marko Krizin

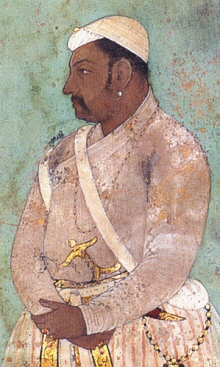
Sur Singh

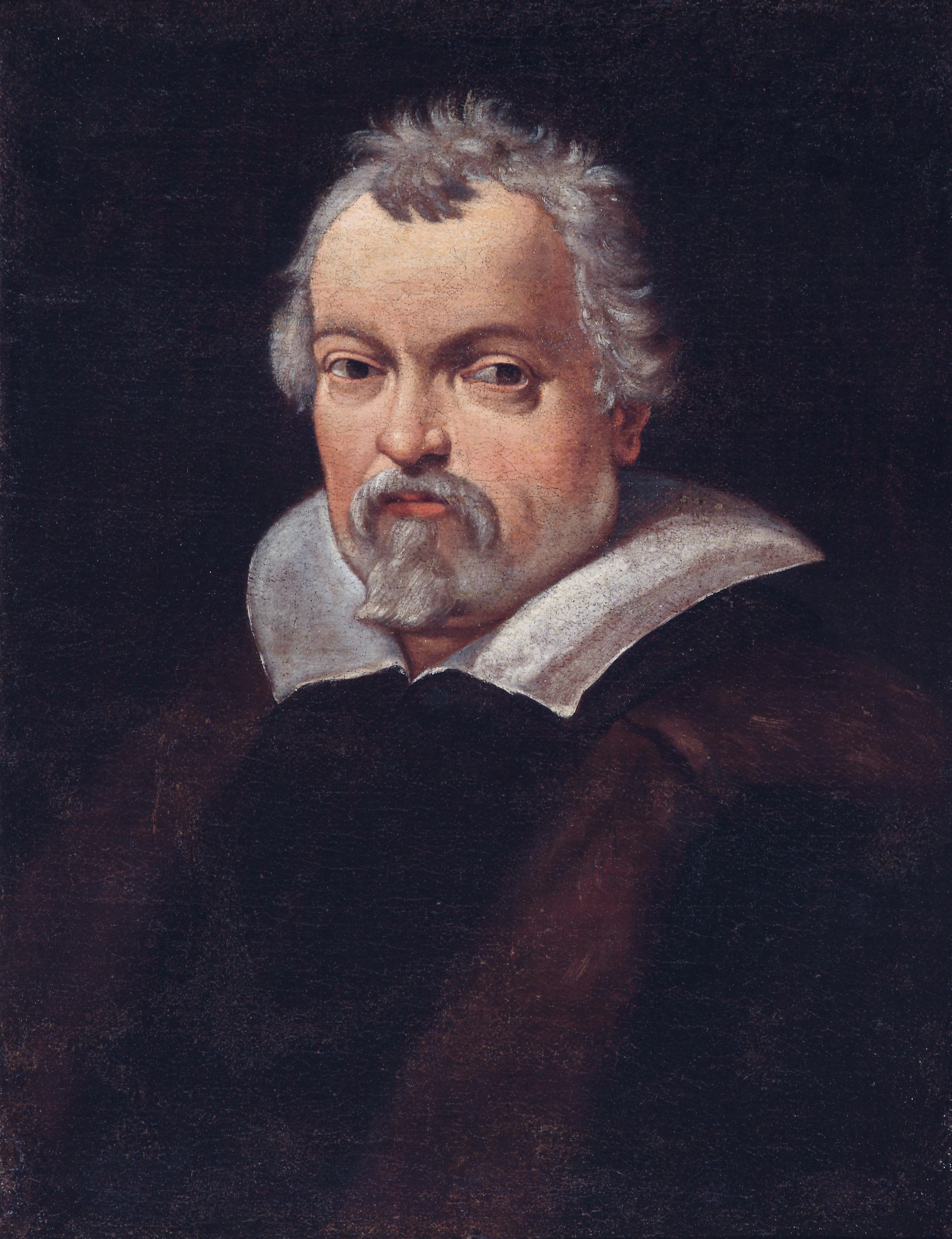
Ludovico Carracci

=== January–March ===
- January 7 – Nicholas Hilliard, English miniature painter (b. c. 1547)
- January 11 – Diane de France, Duchess of Angoulême (b. 1538)
- January 15 – Thomas Clinton, 3rd Earl of Lincoln, English politician (b. 1568)
- January 20 – Éléonore de Bourbon, Dutch princess (b. 1587)
- February 3 – Henry Brooke, 11th Baron Cobham, English conspirator (b. 1564)
- February 9 – Lucilio Vanini, Italian philosopher (b. 1585)
- February 12 – Pierre de Larivey, Italian-born French dramatist (b. 1549)
- February 16 – William Couper, Scottish bishop of Galloway (b. 1568)
- March 2
  - William Cooke, English politician (b. 1572)
  - Anne of Denmark, Queen of James I of England (b. 1574)
- March 5 – Demeter Naprágyi, Hungarian Catholic archbishop (b. 1564)
- March 13 – Richard Burbage, English actor (b. c. 1567)
- March 15
  - Michael Balfour, 1st Lord Balfour of Burleigh, Scottish nobleman
  - Orsolya Dersffy, Hungarian noble (b. 1583)
- March 18 – Chō Tsuratatsu, Japanese samurai (b. 1546)
- March 20
  - Ippolito Galantini, founder of the Congregation of Christian Doctrine of Florence (b. 1565)
  - Matthias, Holy Roman Emperor, Austrian Habsburg ruler (b. 1557)

=== April–June ===
- April 5 – Alexander Home, 1st Earl of Home, Scottish nobleman (b. 1566)
- April 10 – Thomas Jones, Anglican Archbishop of Dublin (b. c. 1550)
- April 16 – Denis Calvaert, Flemish painter (b. 1540)
- April 18 – Taj Bibi Bilqis Makani, Mughal empress (b. 1573)
- April/May – William Larkin, English court portrait painter (b. early 1580s)
- May – John Overall, English bishop (b. 1559)
- May 13 – Johan van Oldenbarnevelt, Dutch statesman (b. 1547)
- May 21 – Hieronymus Fabricius, Italian anatomist (b. 1537)
- May 23 – Stephen Soame, Lord Mayor of London (b. 1540)
- June 18 – Martin Fréminet, French painter (b. 1567)

=== July–September ===
- July 2 – Francis II, Duke of Saxe-Lauenburg (1586–1619) (b. 1547)
- July 6 – Isabella Feltria della Rovere, Italian noblewoman (b. 1552)
- July 22 – Lawrence of Brindisi, Italian saint (b. 1559)
- July 24 – Nabeshima Naoshige, Japanese samurai (b. 1537)
- August 3 – Dorothy Percy, Countess of Northumberland, younger daughter of Walter Devereux (b. c. 1564)
- August 19
  - Thomas Dale, English colonial governor (b. 1570)
  - Jørgen Lunge, Danish politician (b. 1577)
- August 29 – Ferdinando Taverna, Italian Catholic cardinal (b. 1558)
- August 30 – Shimazu Yoshihiro, Japanese samurai and warlord (b. 1535)
- September – Hans Lippershey, Dutch lensmaker (b. 1570)
- September 3 – John Gordon, Scottish bishop (b. 1544)
- September 7
  - Marko Krizin, Croatian Catholic priest (martyred) (b. 1585)
  - Stephen Pongracz, Hungarian saint (b. 1584)
  - Sur Singh, ruler of Marwar (b. 1571)

=== October–December ===
- October
  - Robert Peake the Elder, English court portrait painter (b. c. 1551)
  - Nicholas Yonge, English singer and publisher (b. c. 1560)
- October 9 – Joseph Pardo, Italian rabbi and merchant (b. c. 1561)
- October 14 – Samuel Daniel, English poet (b. 1562)
- October 18 – Petrus Gudelinus, Belgian jurist (b. 1550)
- October 19 – Fujiwara Seika, Japanese philosopher (b. 1561)
- November 13 – Ludovico Carracci, Italian painter (b. 1555)
- December 23 – John Sigismund, Elector of Brandenburg from the House of Hohenzollern (b. 1572)
- December 29
  - Antoine Arnauld, French lawyer (b. 1560)
  - Prince Jeongwon, Korean prince (b. 1580)

=== Date unknown ===
- Bagrat VII
- François d'Amboise, French jurist and writer (b. 1550)
- Thomas Stephens, English Jesuit missionary in Portuguese India (b. c. 1549)
- Caterina Vitale, Maltese pharmacist (b. 1566)
