= Tobias Lohner =

Austrian Jesuit theologian

Tobias Lohner (13 March 1619, in Neuötting in the Diocese of Salzburg – 26 (probably) May, 1697) was an Austrian Jesuit theologian.

== Life ==
He entered the Society of Jesus on 30 August 1637, at Landsberg am Lech, and spent his first years in the classroom, teaching the classics. Later at Dillingen, he was professor, first of philosophy for seven years, then of speculative theology for four years, and finally of moral theology. He was rector of the colleges of Lucerne and Dillingen and master of novices.

== Works ==
His reputation is based mainly on the many works which he wrote, both in Latin and German, on practical questions, especially of asceticism and moral theology. More than twenty years before he died, his literary activity received recognition in the Bibliotheca Scriptorum Societatis Jesu, a work begun by Peter Ribadeneira, continued by Philip Alegambe, and brought up to date (1675) by Nathanael Sotwel.

Among his published works are:

- The Instructissima bibliotheca manualis concionatoria (4 vols., Dillingen, 1681-),

and a series of volumes containing practical instructions, the more important of which are the following:

- Instructio practica de ss. Missæ sacrificio
- Instructio practica de officio divino
- Instructio practica de conversatione apostolica
- Instructio practica pastorum continens doctrinas et industrias ad pastorale munus pie, fructose et secure obeundum
- Instructio practica de confessionibus rite ac fructose excipiendis (complete edition of these instructions, in eleven vols., Dillingen, 1726-)

He published many other similar works on preaching, on catechizing, on giving exhortations, on the origin and excellence of the priesthood, on the various states of life, on consoling the afflicted, on questions of polemical, ascetical, speculative, and moral theology, on the means of overcoming temptations, and on the foundations of mystical theology.
