= Sculthorpe =

Sculthorpe may be a reference to:

== Places ==
- Sculthorpe, Norfolk, a place in the English county of Norfolk

== Surname ==
- Paul Sculthorpe (born 1977), English Rugby league
- Peter Sculthorpe (1929–2014), the Australian composer
