= Nathaniel Bacon (Jesuit) =

English Jesuit (1598–1676)

Nathaniel Bacon SJ (14 August 1598 – 2 December 1676), better known under the assumed name of Southwell (Sotwel, or Sotvellus in Latin), which he took in honor of the Jesuit poet-martyr, Robert Southwell, was an English Jesuit who served in Rome from 1647 until his death as "Secretarius" of the Society of Jesus under four Jesuit generals.

== Early life and education ==
Nathaniel was the son of Thomas Bacon and Elizabeth his wife. He was born on 14 August 1598 in Norfolk, probably at Sculthorpe, near Walsingham. Like his brother Thomas he studied at the Jesuit College of St Omer in the Spanish Netherlands. He was accepted at the Venerable English College of Rome, on 8 October 1617 under the pseudonym of Southwell.

== Career ==
Ordained priest on 21 December 1622, he was sent to England on 19 September 1624. On 8 March 1625 he entered the Jesuit Order. He spent his first year of probation at the noviciate near London then situated either in Edmonton or Camberwell. He moved to Watten for his second year, after which he returned to Rome as minister of the English College in 1627. He was professed of the four vows on 31 July 1634. With the exception of a trip to Piacenza (Italy) in November 1637 Bacon remained in Rome for the rest of his life.

He worked as minister, procurator, consultor, and confessor at the English College. By 1646 he had moved to the Gesù as secretary to Superior General's assistant for Germany. In 1649 he was appointed first pro-secretary and then secretary of the society, a position he held under four successive Superior Generals — Piccolomini, Gottifredi, Nickel, and Oliva. On retiring from the office in 1668 he served as personal admonitor to Superior General Giovanni Paolo Oliva.

== Death ==
Nathaniel died in the professed house of the Gesù, at Rome, on 2 December 1676.

== Works ==
He produced an encyclopedic bibliography in folio, Bibliotheca Scriptorum Societatis Jesu (Rome, 1676), much admired for its thoroughness and latinity, although the listings follow the traditional categorization according to authors' Christian names. This was a continuation of the bibliographies of Pedro de Ribadeneira and Philippe Alegambe.

In the 19th century it was updated by Belgian Jesuits Augustin de Backer and Carlos Sommervogel as Bibliothèque de la Compagnie de Jesus, with authors listed by surname, a standard reference work.

Southwell wrote also A Journal of Meditations for Every Day of the Year, published in London in 1669. The translator was Edward Harvey alias Mico, a jesuit who died in prison in 1678.
