= Théophile Raynaud =

French theologian

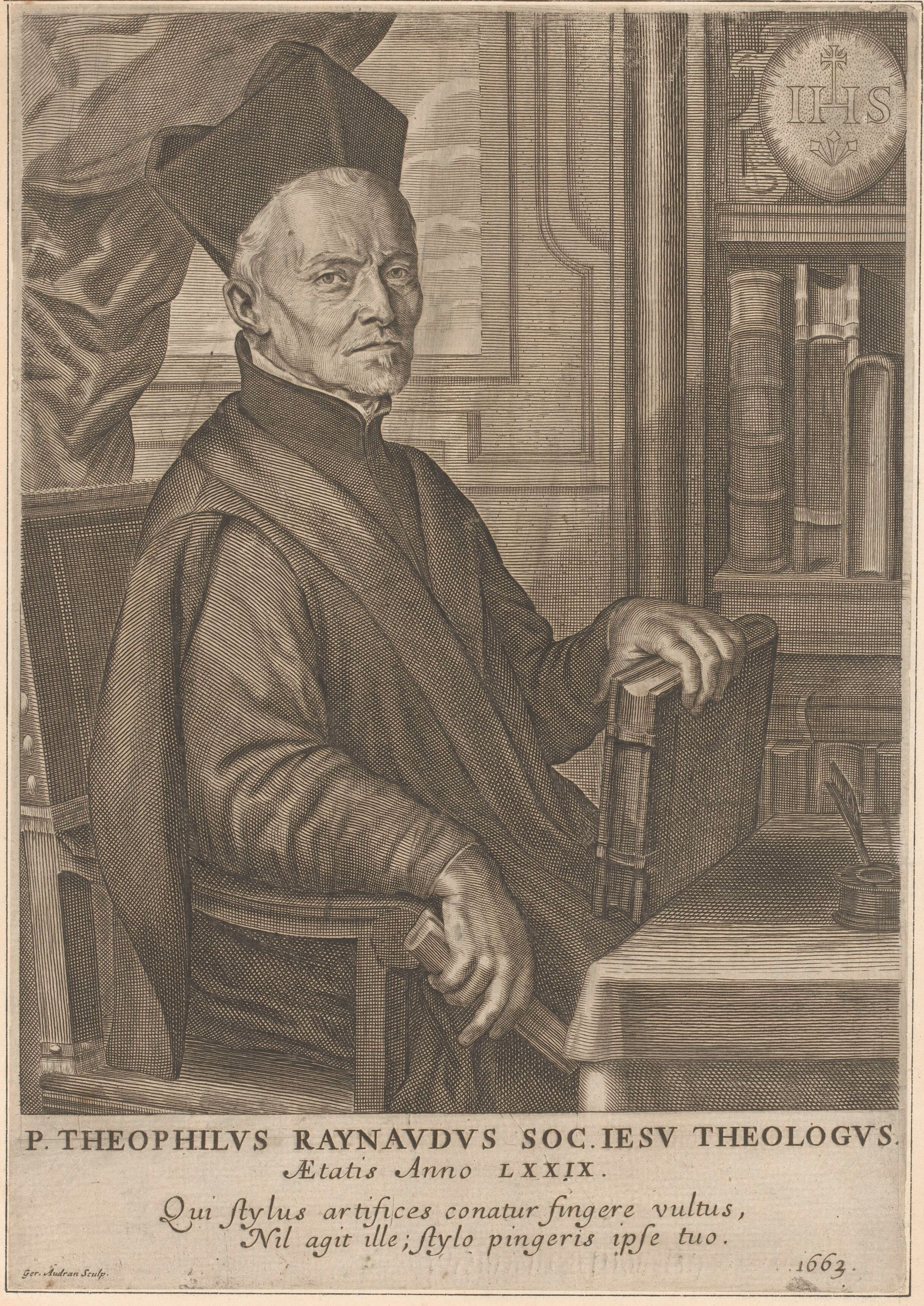
Théophile Raynaud

Théophile Raynaud (15 November 1583 – 31 October 1663) was a French Jesuit theologian and writer.

== Biography ==
Théophile Raynaud was born November 15, 1583, at Sospel, near Nice. He studied at Avignon, and became quite accomplished as a student of philosophy. In 1602 he entered the Society of Jesus, and was made one of their teachers at Lyon. At first he taught elementary branches, but soon found advancement, and was finally given a professorship of philosophy and theology.

In 1631 he was chosen confessor to prince Maurice of Savoy, and repaired to Paris. Here he was made uncomfortable by unpleasant relations to Richelieu, who, having been attacked by a Spanish theologian for the alliance of the French government with the German Protestants, had asked Raynaud for a reply and been refused. Raynaud was, at his request to the order, transferred to Chambéry, and this bishopric soon becoming vacant, he was solicited to fill it. But he was far from being pleased, and even prepared to return to Lyon.

He did not again revisit Savoy until 1639, and then only to his unhappiness. He had, during his sojourn at Chambéry, contracted a close friendship with Pierre Monod, his companion; and when he heard of his detention in the fortress of Montmélian, he tried in every way to have it brought to an end. Richelieu took offence at this ardent affection, which was natural between friends, and, not being willing to permit relations between Raynaud and a prisoner of the state, he solicited and obtained from the court of Savoy the arrest of the unfortunate Jesuit. At the end of three months he was released, and sought refuge at Carpentras, which then belonged to the Papal States.

But the aversion of his enemies would not leave him long undisturbed. By order of the cardinal-legate Antonio Barberini, he was conducted to Avignon, and locked in a chamber of the pontifical palace. With difficulty released, he left for Rome, with the manuscript of Heteroclita Spiritualia, of which the impression had been suspended, submitted it for examination to Philippe Alegambe, and obtained the authority to publish.

In 1645 he returned to Rome in company with cardinal Federico Sforza, and was presented to the pope and the Sacred College as one of the most ardent champions of the papal rights. He afterwards made two journeys to Rome, the first time in 1647, and there occupied for some time a theological chair; the second time in 1651, when he assisted at the general assembly of his order. He afterwards obtained permission to establish himself at Lyon, and there passed the rest of his life in teaching and composing his works. He died October 31, 1663.

== Works ==
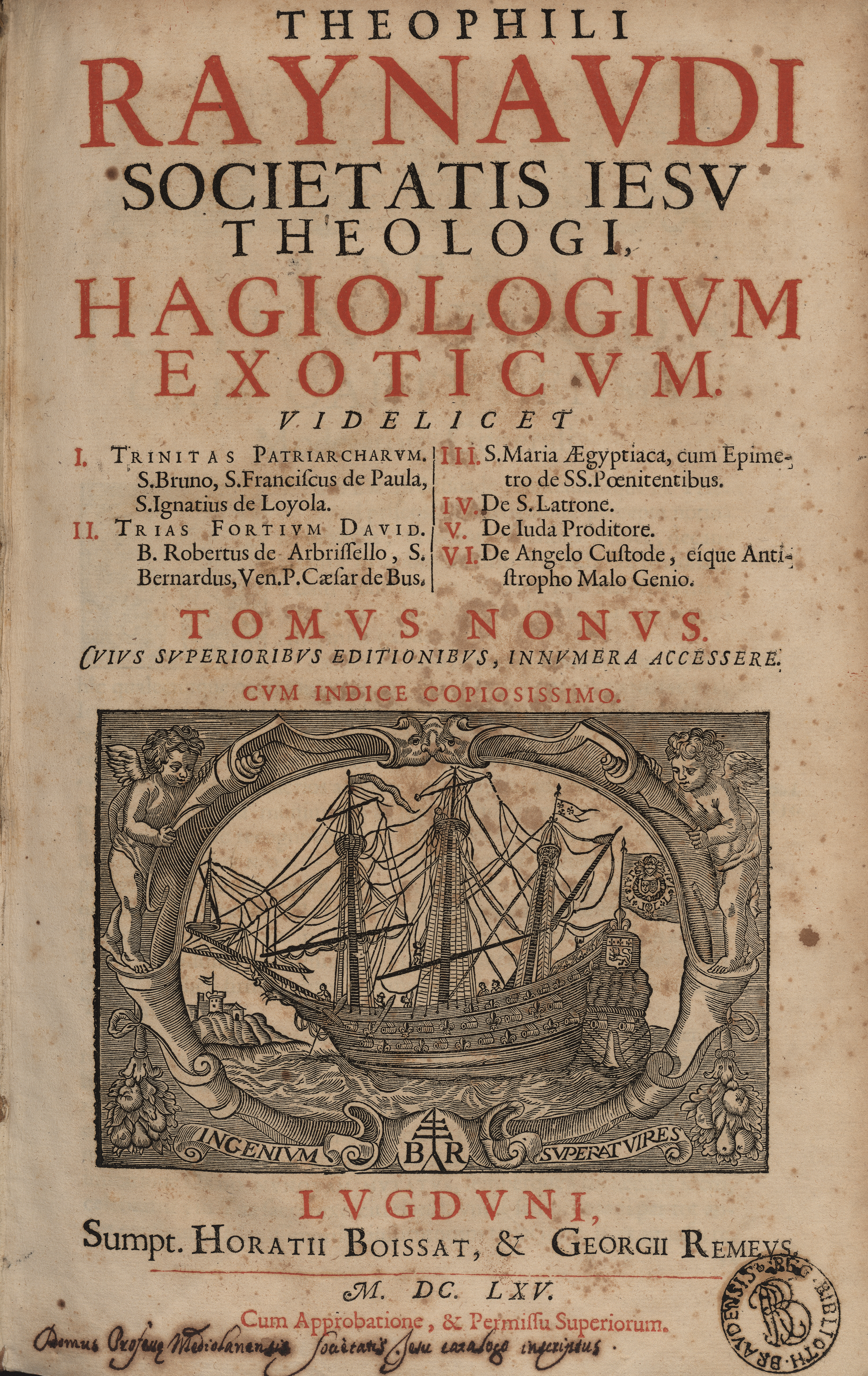
Hagiologium exoticum

In 92 separate works, covering almost the entire field of Catholic theology, he showed himself an erudite theologian and a writer of great fertility. His style, however, is often prolix and sometimes obscure, whilst in his controversial writings he indulges in satire and invective.

His collected works, revised by himself shortly before his death, were published under the direction of his confrère, John Bertet, in nineteen volumes (Lyons, 1665). A twentieth volume, entitled "Th. Raynaudi Apopompaeus" (i.e. the scapegoat), containing a number of writings which the author had purposely excluded from the collection, was published by an anonymous editor a few years later (Cracow, 1669); this volume was condemned by the Congregation of the Index.

The main titles of the "Opera" are:

- I. "Theologia Patrum; Christus Deus Homo";
- II. "De Attributis Christi";
- III. "Moralis disciplina";
- IV. "De virtutibus et vitiis";
- V. "Theologia naturalis";
- VI. "Opuscula eucharistica";
- VII. "Marialia";
- VIII-IX. "Hagiologium";
- X. "Pontificia";
- XI. "Critica sacra";
- XII. "Miscella sacra";
- XIII. "Miscella philologica";
- XIV. "Moralia";
- XV-XVI. "Heteroclita spiritualia";
- XVII. "Ascetica";
- XVIII. "Polemica".

XIX contains general indices.
