= Thomas Southwell (Jesuit) =

English Jesuit priest, theological writer, and teacher (1592–1637)

Thomas Southwell SJ (1592–1637), born Thomas Bacon, was an English Jesuit priest, theological writer, and teacher.

== Life ==
Son of Thomas Bacon and Elizabeth his wife, and elder brother of Nathanael Southwell, he was born at Sculthorpe, near Walsingham, Norfolk. He studied at King's Lynn, and then took the humanity course in the College of St Omer.

Southwell was admitted a student of the English College, Rome on 10 November 1610, entered the Society of Jesus in July 1613, and was professed of the four vows on 19 April 1626. For eight years he was professor of theology in the college of his order at Liège, and he was for a time vice-rector of the college. He died at Watten on 11 December 1637.

== Works ==
Southwell's works were:

- Vindiciæ pro Nicolao Smitheo, Liège, 1631.
- Regula viva seu Analysis Fidei in Deo per Ecclesiam nos docentis auctoritatem,’ Antwerp, 1638. It was a defence of the authority of the Roman Catholic Church.
- Quæstio sexagesima S. Thomæ de Sacramento in genere, left in a manuscript that went to the library of the University of Liège.
- A treatise on The First Part of the Sum of St. Thomas Aquinas, un published.

Southwell also wrote a manuscript of case studies in casuistry for "the education of English Catholic missionary priests", focusing "on the problems facing Catholic priests and laymen under persecution in England" during the reign of Charles I, which manuscript has been edited by Peter Holmes and published by the Catholic Record Society as Caroline Casuistry: The Cases of Conscience of Fr Thomas Southwell, SJ.
