= Hendrik Zoesius =

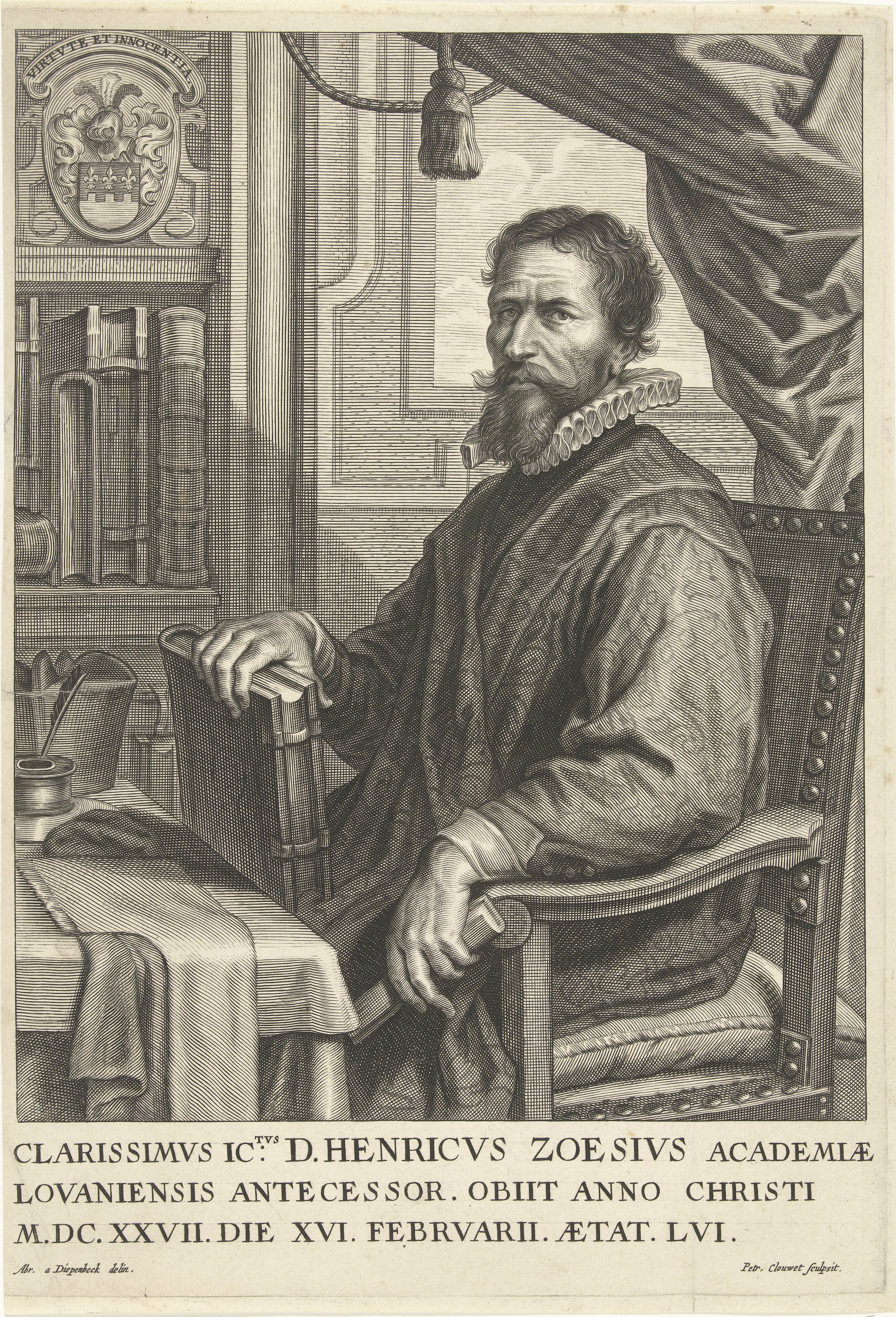
Zoesius' portrait engraved by P. Clonet after A. van Diepenbeeck.

Hendrik Zoesius (Latin: Henricus Zoesius; 1571– 26 February 1627) was a Dutch jurist active at the University of Leuven. He is known for his academic career in canon law and for legal-theological commentaries that continued to circulate into the 18th century.

== Life and Career ==
Zoesius was born in Amersfoort in 1571, in a distinguished family. He studied Greek philosophy and jurisprudence in Leuven, then travelled to Spain with Count Christoffel van Elten and spent some time at the University of Salamanca, where he made many friends and was admired for his experience in jurisprudence at such a young age. He returned to Leuven in 1603 where he obtained a licentiate in law, and subsequently taught rhetoric and Greek. In 1606 he was appointed professor of Greek at the Collegium Buslidianum. In the same year he became professor regius Institutionum, received his doctorate in both law degrees in 1610, and succeeded Gudelinus in 1619 as professor Pandectarum. He was elected rector of the university in August 1626, and held that position during the celebrations marking the university's bicentennial, but died before the end of his rectorship on February 26, 1627.

== Selected works ==
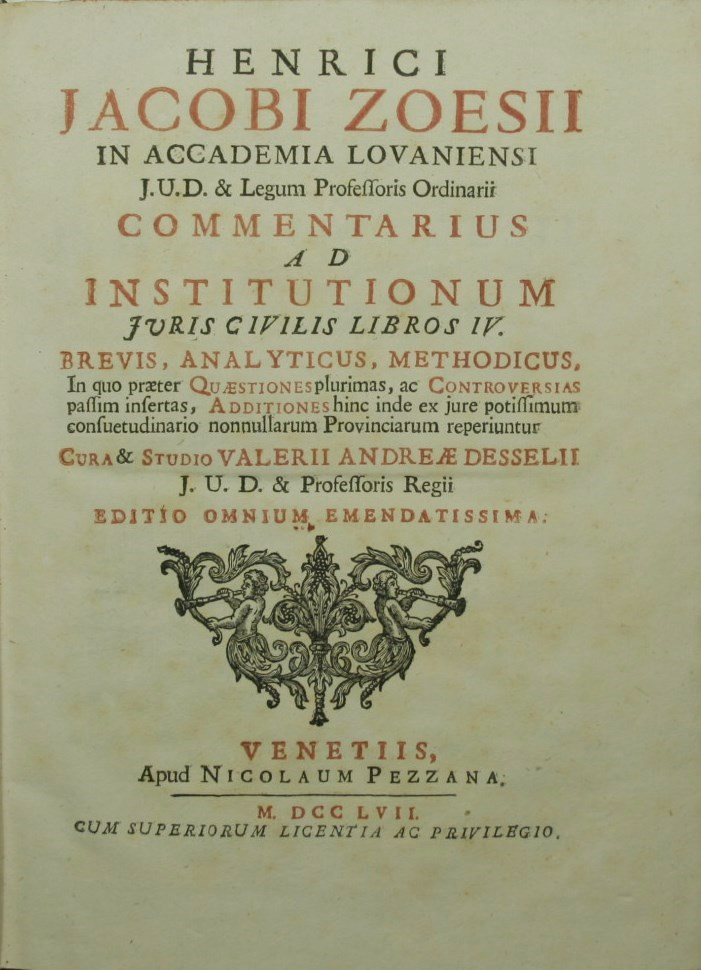
Commentarius ad Institutionum juris civilis libros IV, Venice, 1757.

His writings were published posthumously by Valerius Andreas, they were all highly authoritative and were reprinted numerous times until the mid-18th century, both in Leuven and Cologne:

- Commentarius ad Digestorum seu Pandectarum juris civilis libros L (Lov. 1645)
- Commentarius ad decretales epistolas Gregorii IX P.M. (Lov. 1647)
- Commentarii ad Institutiones Imperiales, Lovan. 1652, 40, cum additionibas perpetuis. Val. Andreas, Lovan. 1653, 40.
- Commentarius ad Institutionum juris civilis libros IV (Lov. 1653).
- Commentarius in jus canonicum universum, sive ad decretales epistolas Gregorii IX (1725 edition digitized)
- Commentaries paratitlares ad Codicem Colon. 1710 4.
