= Louis Thomassin =

French theologian and Oratorian

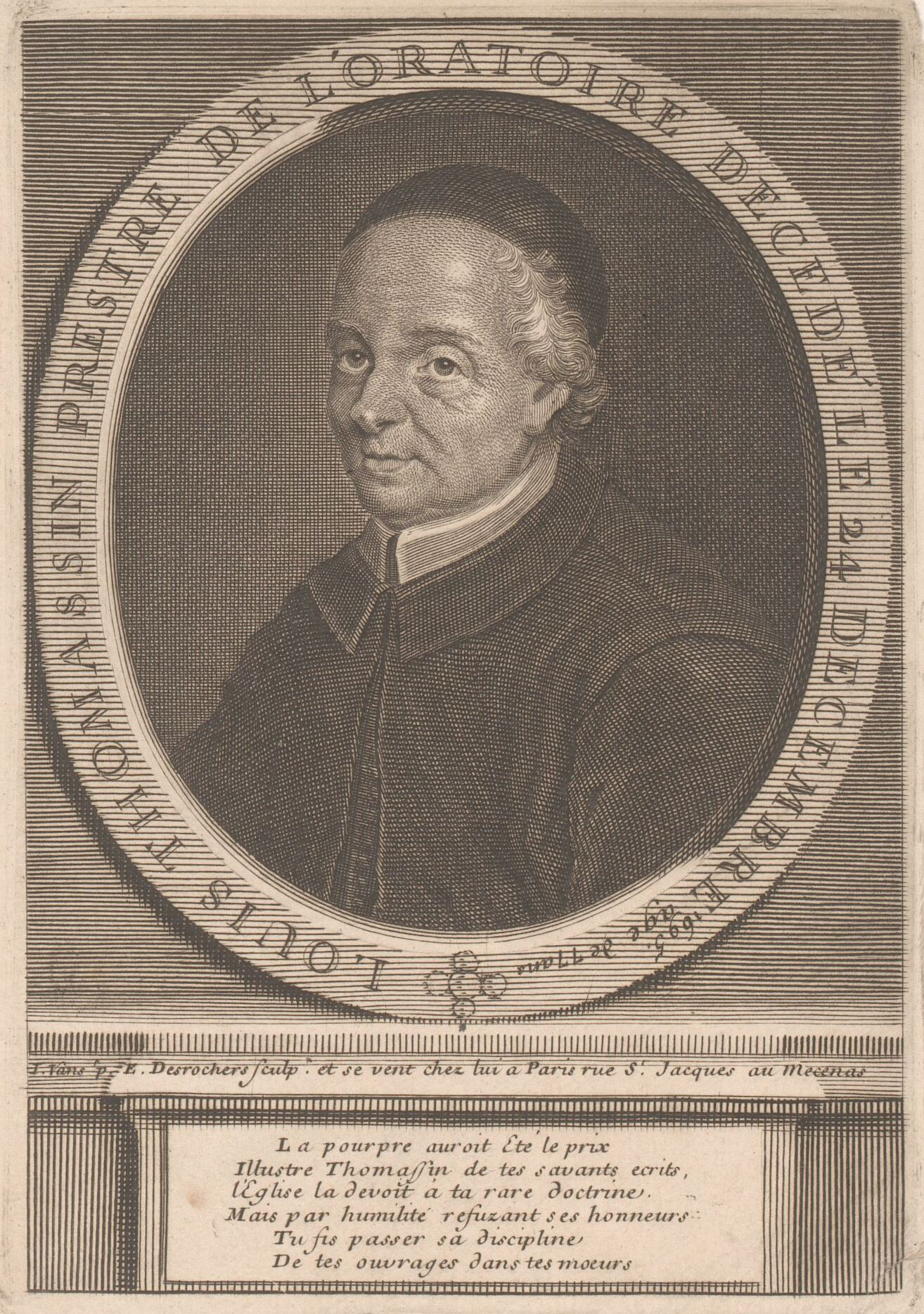
Louis Thomassin.

Louis Thomassin (French pronunciation: [lwi tɔmasɛ̃]; Latin: Ludovicus Thomassinus; 28 August 1619, Aix-en-Provence – 24 December 1695, Paris) was a French theologian and Oratorian.

== Life ==
At the age of thirteen he entered the Oratory and for some years was professor of literature in various colleges of the congregation, of theology at Saumur, and finally in the seminary of Saint Magloire, in Paris, where he remained until his death.

Thomassin was one of the most learned men of his time, "Vir stupendae plane eruditionis", as Hugo von Hurter says, in his Nomenclator literarius recentioris II (Innsbruck, 1893), 410.

== Works ==
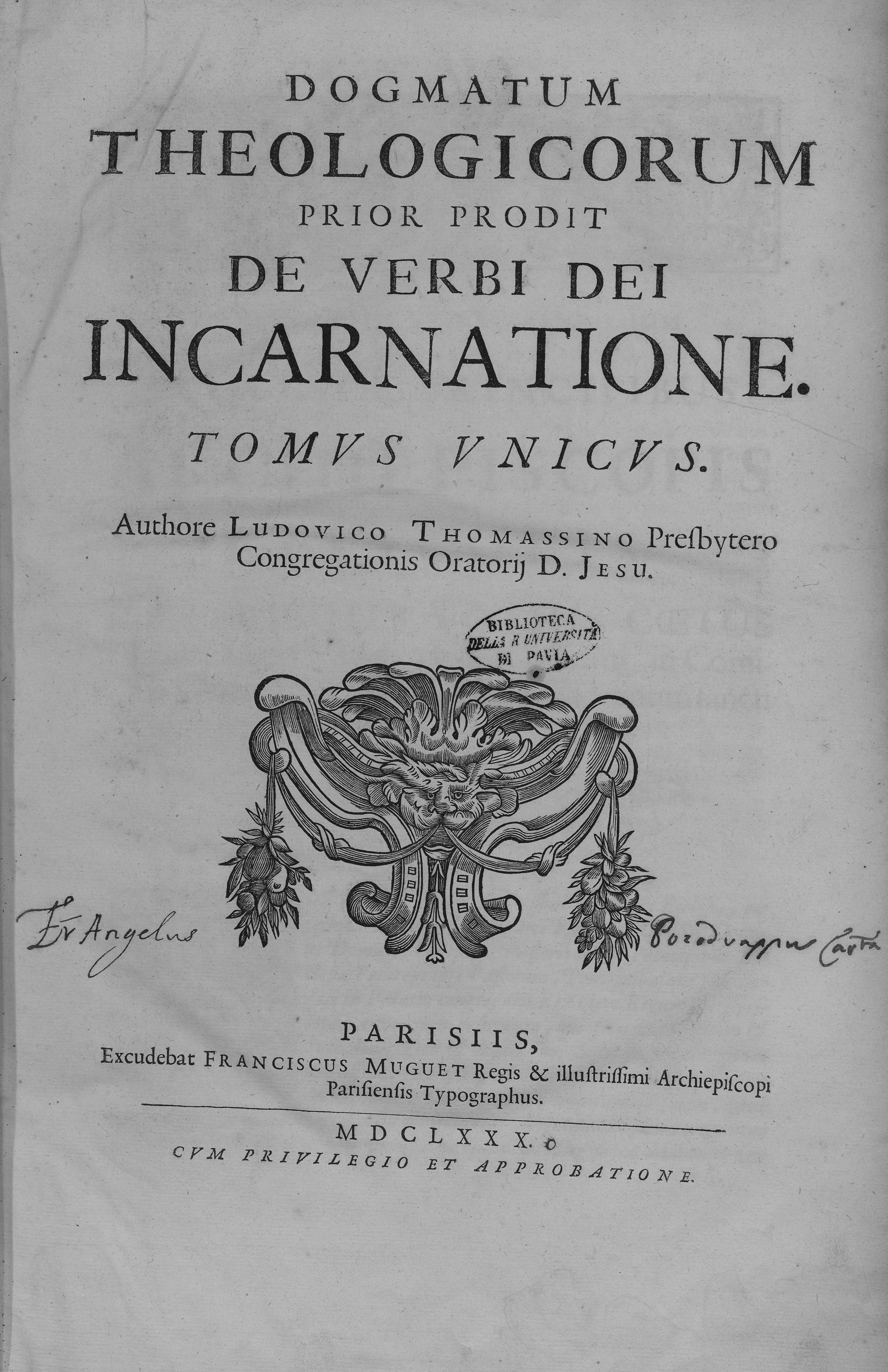
De Verbi Dei Incarnatione, 1680

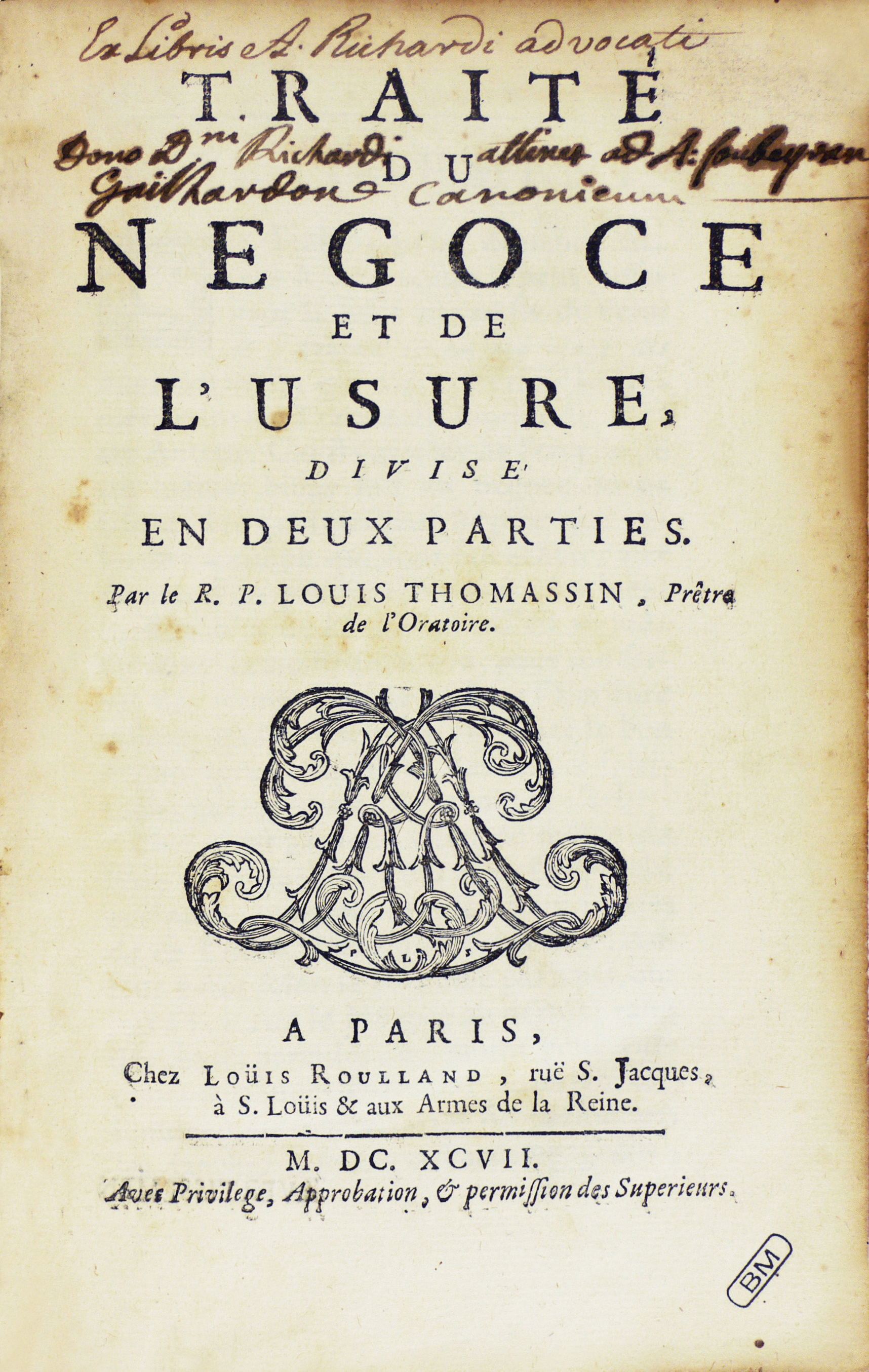
Traité du négoce et de l'usure, 1697.

His chief works are:

- "Ancienne et nouvelle discipline de l'église touchant les bénéfices et les bénéficiers" (2 vols. in fol., Paris, 1678–79 with an additional volume pub. 1681), which passed through several French and Latin editions and several abridgments (in Latin the title is 'Vetus et nova ecclesiae disciplina circa beneficia et beneficiarios');
- "Dogmatum theologicorum ... de Incarnatione, de Dei proprietatibus ... etc." (3 vols. in fol., Paris, 1680–89), likewise re-edited several times (the treatise on the Incarnation is regarded as Thomassin's masterpiece)
- a series of "Traités historiques et dogmatiques" on ecclesiastical fasts, feasts, the Divine Office, the unity of the Church, truth and lying, alms, business and usury (1680–97)
- a series of methods of studying and teaching the humanities, philosophy, grammar, history (1681–92)
- the "Glossarium universale hebraicum" (in fol., Paris, 1697)
- "Traité dogmatique et historique des édits et d'autres moyens ... dont on s'est servi . . . pour établir et maintenir l'unité de l'église" (3 vols., in 4°, Paris, 1705).

The last-named two posthumous works were published by P. Bordes, who wrote a life of Thomassin at the beginning of the "Glossarium".
