= Alexander von Spaen =

Generalfeldmarschall of Brandenburg-Prussia (1619–1692)

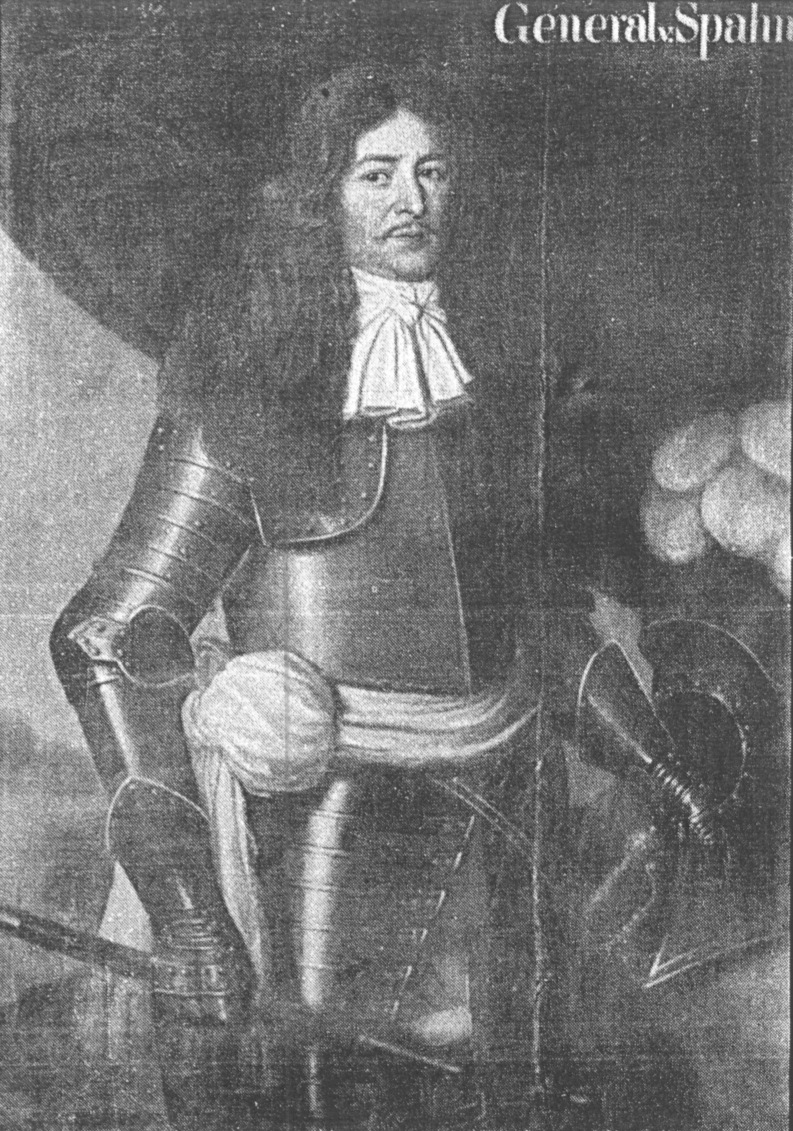
Alexander von Spaen

Alexander Freiherr von Spaen (14 January 1619 – 23 October 1692) was a Generalfeldmarschall of Brandenburg-Prussia.

Spaen was born in the Duchy of Cleves as the son of Bernhard von Spaen, the lord of Kreuzfort.

By 1650, Spaen served as a Landdrost, a government councillor, and an Oberst (colonel), and he became the leader of a cavalry regiment the following year. In 1654 he captured Dietrich Karl zu Wylich-Winnenthal, the leader of an uprising against Elector Frederick William, and brought him to Spandau. Spaen led Prussia's Horse Guards (Leibregiment zu Pferde) during the Northern Wars, participating in the Battle of Warsaw. The colonel was restationed on the Lower Rhine in 1656. He became commander of Kalkar on 27 May 1657 and was promoted to Generalmajor the following year. On 25 May 1661, Spaen received the title Freiherr from the Holy Roman Emperor.

From 1672-79, Spaen was a leader in Brandenburg-Prussia's campaigns against Sweden and France. He participated in the sieges of Wesel, Werl, Anklam, and Stettin, becoming Governor of Wesel and Generalleutnant in 1675. Four years later Spaen became a member of the Privy Council and Government President of Cleves and the County of Mark. He became Master of Ordinance (Generalfeldzeugmeister) on 1 December 1688. The following year he was a representative of the Margraviate of Brandenburg at the English court. During the War of the Grand Alliance against France, Spaen participated in the siege of Bonn and the Battle of Fleurus. He received supreme command of the electoral troops in 1690 and was promoted to Generalfeldmarschall on 12 March 1691. He died the following year at Kleve.

Spaen was married three times: with Hendrine von Arnheim (died 4 August 1671); with Johanna Dorothea Quadt von Wyckerath-Soppenbroich (died 4 September 1676); and with Dorothea von Flemming, herself the widow of Brandenburg's first minister, Otto von Schwerin and before that of Bodo von Schlieben.
