= Pedro de Ribadeneira =

Spanish hagiographer

Pedro de Ribadeneira SJ
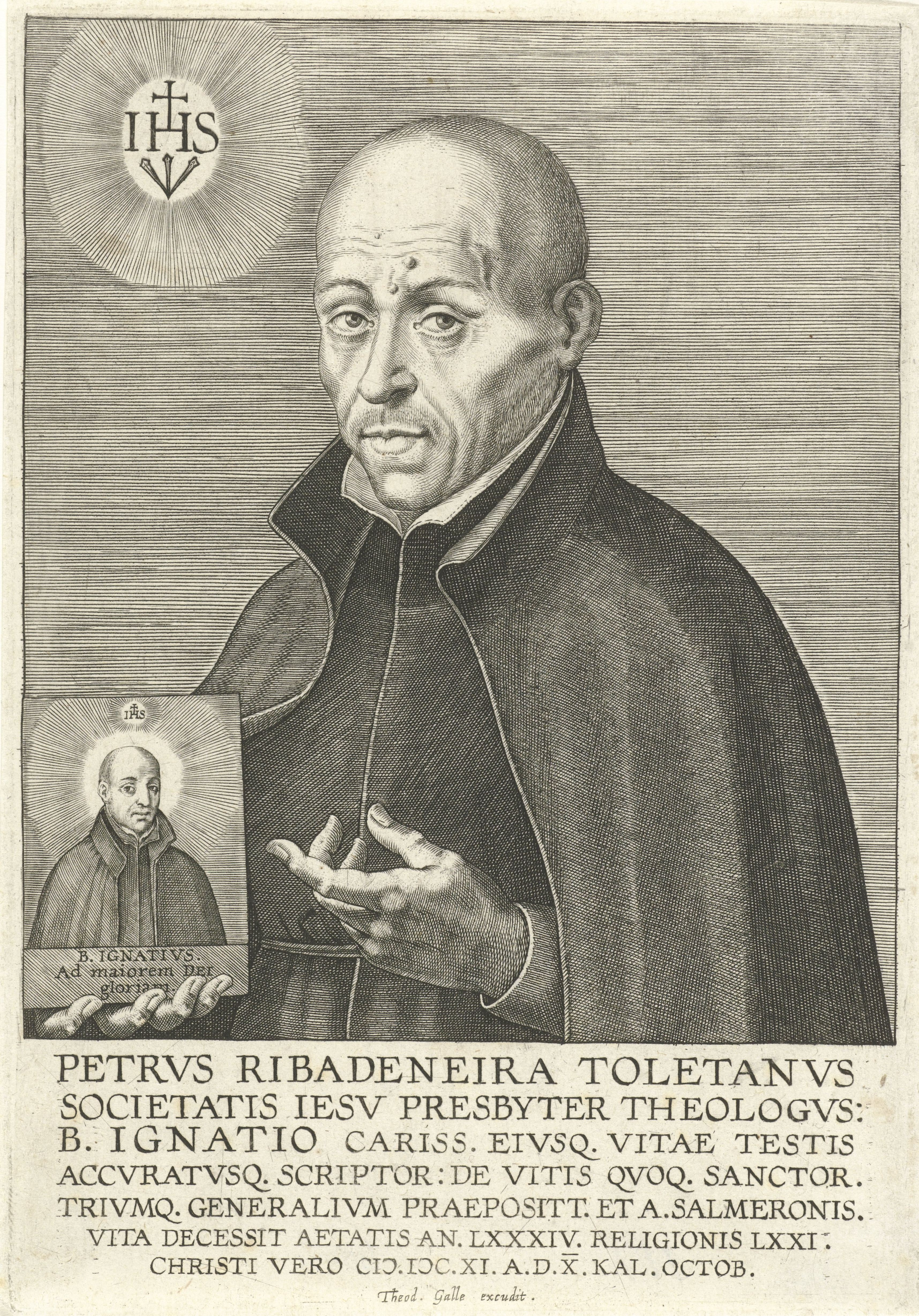
- Born: Pedro Ortiz de Cisneros; 1 November 1527 Toledo, Spain
- Died: 10 September or 22 September 1611 Madrid, Spain
- Genre: hagiography
- Notable works: Life of Loyola

Pedro de Ribadeneira SJ (born Pedro Ortiz de Cisneros; 1 November 1527 – 10 September or 22 September 1611) was a Spanish hagiographer, Jesuit priest, companion of Ignatius of Loyola, and a Spanish Golden Age ascetic writer.

== Life ==
Pedro was born at Toledo, Spain. His father, Alvaro Ortiz de Cisneros, was the son of Pedro Gonzales Cedillo and grandson of Hernando Ortiz de Cisneros, whom Ferdinand IV had honoured with the governorship of Toledo and important missions.

Pedro went to Italy as a page of Cardinal Alexander Farnese, and at Rome was admitted by Ignatius of Loyola as a member of the Society of Jesus on 18 September 1540, eight days before the approval of the order by Paul III. He pursued his studies at the Universities of Paris, Leuven, and Padua (1542) in philosophy and theology.

He was ordered in November, 1549, to go to Palermo, to profess rhetoric at the new college which the Society had just opened in that city. He filled this chair for two years and a half, devoting his leisure time to visiting and consoling the sick in the hospitals. Meanwhile, Ignatius was negotiating the creation of the German College, and during the autumn of 1552 he called on the talent and eloquence of the young professor of rhetoric at Palermo. Ribadeneira amply fulfilled the expectations of his master and delivered the inaugural address amid the applause of an august assembly of prelates and Roman nobles. He was ordained priest 8 December 1553. During the twenty-one years which followed he filled the most important posts in the government of the order.

Ignatius, in 1555, sent him on a mission to Belgium; in pursuance of it he visited England in 1558. A later result of his visit was his Historia Ecclesiastica del scisma del Reyno de Inglaterra (1588–1594), often reprinted, and used in later editions of Nicholas Sander's De Origine et Progressu Schismatis Anglicani. On 25 November 1556 he left Belgium and reached Rome on 3 February 1557, setting out again on 17 October for Flanders. His sojourn in the Low Countries was interrupted for five months (November 1558 to March 1559); this period he spent in London, having been summoned there on account of the sickness of Mary Tudor, Queen of England, which ended in her death.

In 1560 he was made Provincial of the Society of Jesus in Tuscany, then transferred as Provincial to Sicily in 1563, again employed in Flanders. The accession of Everard Mercurian as general of the order brought a great change to Ribadeneira. His health being much impaired, he was ordered to Spain (1571), preferably to Toledo, his native town, to recuperate. This was a dreadful blow to the poor invalid, a remedy worse than the disease. He obeyed, but had been scarcely a year in his native land when he began to importune his general by letter to permit him to return to Italy. These solicitations continued for several years. In 1574 he settled in Madrid, where he died on 10 September or 22 September 1611.

== Works ==
His most important work is the Life of Loyola (1572); his biography of Ignatius was the first of its kind. In his first edition of the Life, as also in the second enlarged issue (1587), Ribadeneira affirmed that Ignatius had wrought no miracle, except the foundation of his Society. In the process for the canonization of Ignatius, a narrative published by Ribadeneira in 1609 asserted that miracles had occurred; and these are recorded in an abridgment of the Life by Ribadeneira (published posthumously in 1612) with a statement by Ribadeneira that he had known of them in 1572 but was not then satisfied of their proof. For this change of opinion he is taken to task by Pierre Bayle.

Ribadeneira was a very able and credulous writer, which is shown in his biographies of the successors of Ignatius in the generalship of the Society, Diego Lainez and Francis Borgia; and especially by his Flos Sanctorum (1599–1610), a collection of saints' lives, entirely superseded by the labors of the Bollandists.

His other works include:

- Tratado de la religion (1595), intended as a refutation of Niccolò Machiavelli's The Prince;
- Tratado de la tribulación (Madrid, 1589), his most famous ascetic work;
- Manual de oraciones para uso y aprovechamiento de la gente devota.

== Sources ==
- See his autobiography in his Bibliotheca Scriptorum Societatis Jesu (1602 and 1608, supplemented by P. Alegambe and N. Southwell in 1676);
- N. Antonio, Bibliotheca Hispana Nova (1788); Biographie Universelle (Michaud) (1842–1865). (A. Go.*)
