= Joseph Ames (naval commander) =

Joseph Ames (5 March 1619 – December 1695) was an English naval commander under the Commonwealth.

Ames was born in Great Yarmouth on 5 March 1619. Brought up as a sailor from his youth, he was one of the commanders of a small Channel fleet watching the Dutch coast in 1641. In January 1653 he returned to Plymouth from Barbados, with a large consignment of sugar, which had only recently been planted in the island, and in July of the same year he was present at the engagement with the Dutch off the Texel in which Maarten Tromp was killed. "For eminent service in saving ye triumph fired in fight with the Dutch" on that occasion, a gold medal was awarded him by parliament. In succeeding years Ames was in command of several ships of war, and made repeated voyages to America and the West Indies. Under his care many royalist prisoners were transported to the colonies, and on 8 October 1655 he was the bearer of a young deer as a present to Cromwell from the president of the Providence Plantation in New England. He withdrew from active service, according to his grandson, the bibliographer, about 1673, and retired to Yarmouth, where he died in December 1695. He was a member of the Presbyterian congregation of his native town. Several of his letters, addressed to the Admiralty commissioners under the Commonwealth, are preserved among the State papers of the time.
