= Petrus Gudelinus =

Dutch jurist (1550–1619)

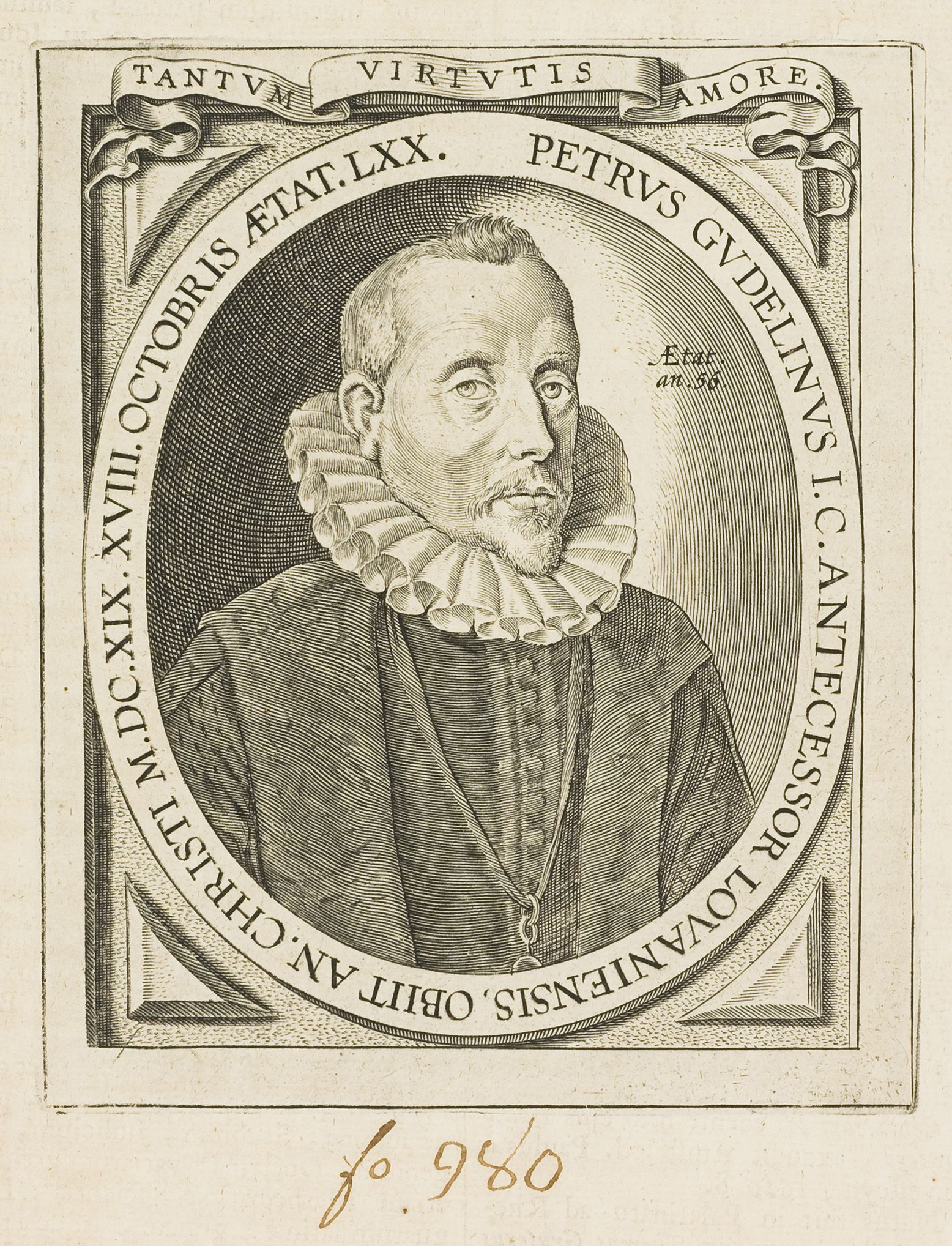
Petrus Gudelinus

Petrus Gudelinus, born Pierre Goudelin (8 August 1550 – 18 October 1619) was a Dutch jurist.

Goudelin was born in Ath. After studies of philosophy and law in Leuven, he practiced law before the Grote Raad van Mechelen, the appeals court for the provinces of the Netherlands. He taught Roman law at the University of Leuven after his promotion in 1576, becoming professor in 1582. He died, aged 69, in Leuven.

His writings were published mostly posthumously based on lecture notes. They include the Commentatorium de iure novissimo libro sex (1620), which presented the content of the Novellae together with the corresponding Dutch and French customary law, and two writings on international law, De jure feudorum commentarii (1624) and De jure pacis (1620). Gudelinus was among the first jurists who complemented the study of Roman law with that of contemporary national law, and who addressed international law as a distinct field of study.
