= Philippe Alegambe =

Belgian priest and bibliographer (1592–1652)

Philippe Alegambe SJ (22 January 1592, Brussels, Belgium – 6 September 1652, Rome, Italy) was a Belgian Jesuit priest and bibliographer.

== Biography ==
After completing High School studies in Brussels, Alegambe went to Spain, in the service of the Duke of Osuna. When the latter was sent as Viceroy to Sicily (1611) Alegambe accompanied him as private secretary. There he entered the Society of Jesus at Palermo, on 7 September 1613. He further studied at the Roman College in Rome. After ordination to the priesthood (1621) Alegambe was sent to teach Philosophy and Theology at Graz, Austria, and for three years traveled through Europe (France, Spain, Italy), as preceptor of the Prince of Eggenberg's son. Back to Graz he taught Moral Theology to Jesuit students (1633–38). In 1638 he was again on the road: he accompanies the young prince to Rome, as part of an embassy sent by the Emperor to pope Urban VIII. At the end of the mission Alegambe is retained in Rome by Mutius Vitelleschi, Superior General of the Society of Jesus, to become his Latin secretary. Alegambe was also superior of the Roman professed house of the Jesuits.

== Main work ==
He is chiefly remembered for his Bibliotheca Scriptorum Societatis Jesu, published in Antwerp (1642). It was a continuation and enlargement of Father Pedro de Ribadeneira's Catalogue, which had been brought up to 1608. This updating of the Bibliotheca was done with the help of Jean Bolland.

== Other writings ==
- Bibliotheca Scriptorum Societatis Iesu, 1643.
- De vita et moribus P. Ioannis Cardim Lusitani, e Societate Jesu, Rome, 1645.
- Acta Sanctae Justae virg. et mart., ex variis MSS.
- Heroes et victimae caritatis Societatis Jesu, Rome, 1658.

== Bibliography ==
- Sommervogel, C. (1890–1932). Bibliothèque de la Compagnie de Jésus. Vol. 1. Brussels-Paris. pp. 151–153.
- McShane, E. D. (2003). "Alegambe, Philippe". In Berard Marthalar (ed.). New Catholic Encyclopedia. Vol. 1: A-Azt (2 ed.). Detroit: Thomson Gale. p. 249.
