= Sculthorpe, Norfolk =

Village in Norfolk, England

Coordinates: 52.84205°N 0.81379°E

Sculthorpe
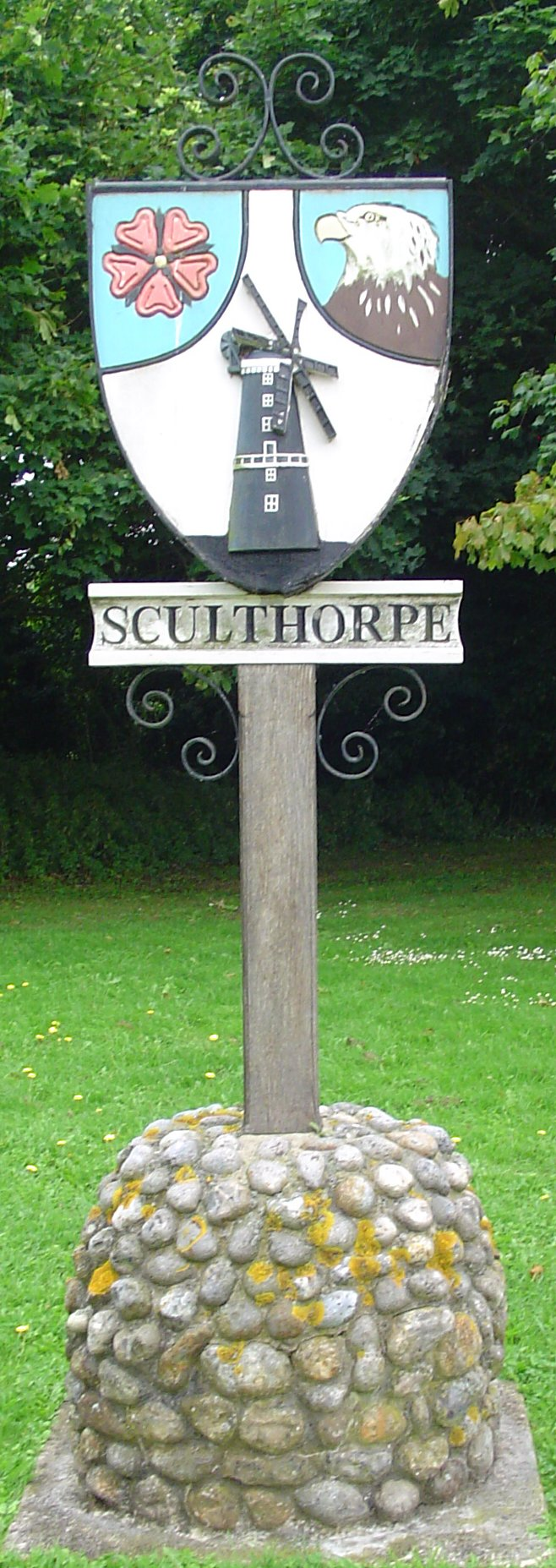
- Signpost in Sculthorpe

- Location within Norfolk
- Area: 8.52 km^{2} (3.29 sq mi)
- Population: 751 (2011)
  - Density: 88/km^{2} (230/sq mi)
- OS grid reference: TF896308
- Civil parish: Sculthorpe
- District: North Norfolk
- Shire county: Norfolk
- Region: East
- Country: England
- Sovereign state: United Kingdom
- Post town: FAKENHAM
- Postcode district: NR21
- Police: Norfolk
- Fire: Norfolk
- Ambulance: East of England

Sculthorpe is a village and civil parish in the English county of Norfolk. The village is some 4 km (2.5 mi) north-west of Fakenham and 5 km (3.1 mi) south-east of South Creake.

The village's name means 'Skuli's outlying farm/settlement'.

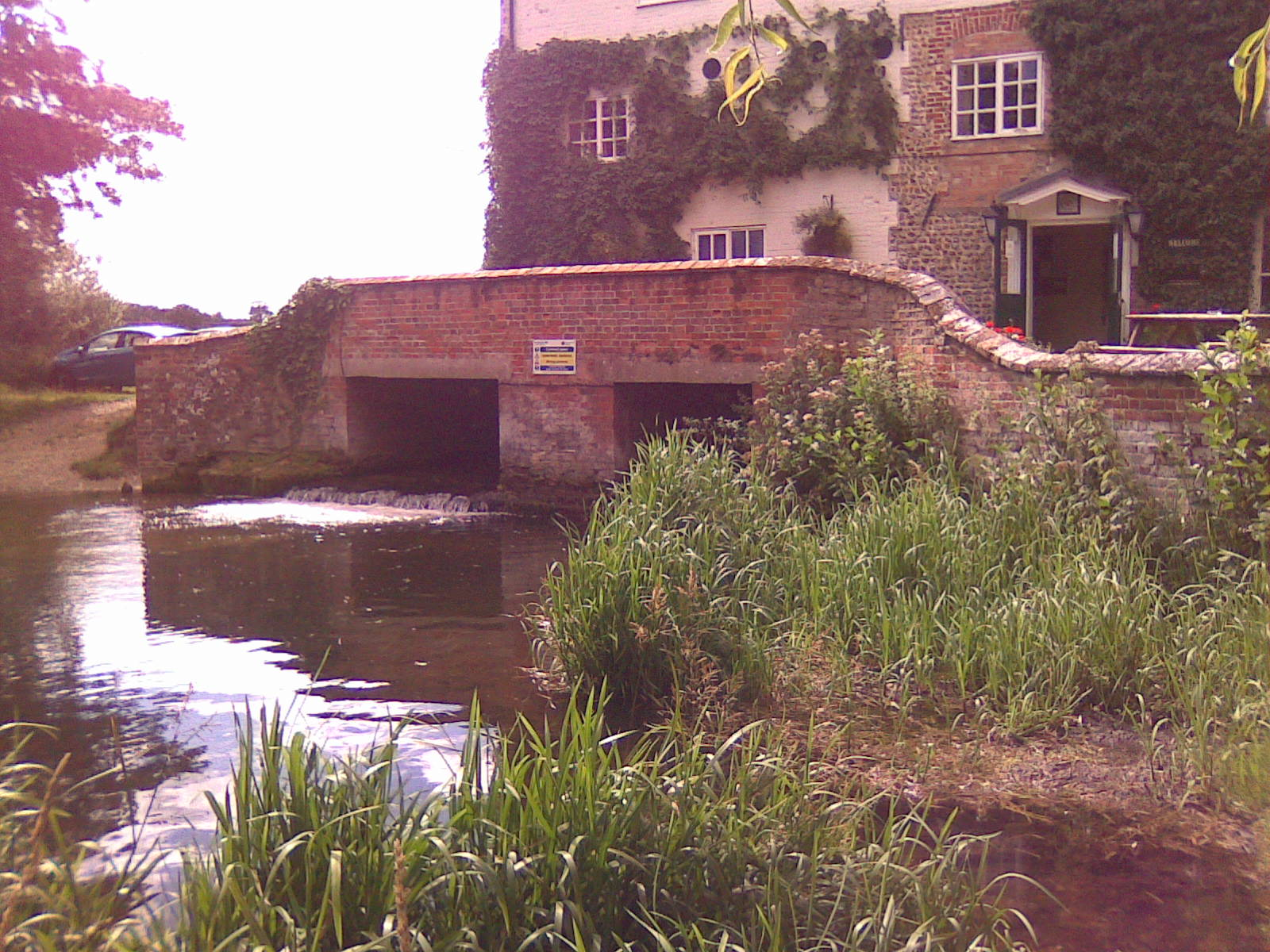
The former water mill, beside a ford.

The civil parish has an area of 8.52 km^{2} (3.29 sq mi) and in 2001 had a population of 744 in 312 households, the population increasing to 751 at the 2011 census. For the purposes of local government, the parish falls within the district of North Norfolk.

The former water mill, about a mile south of the parish church, is now a pub and restaurant, but some of the workings remain visible.

The large airfield of RAF Sculthorpe lies immediately to the west of the village.

Sculthorpe Moor Community Nature Reserve lies to the south of the village in Turf Moor Road

The Village also has a second pub called The Sculthorpe Aviator.

== Notes ==
http://kepn.nottingham.ac.uk/map/place/Norfolk/Sculthorpe
