= 1670s =

Decade

The 1670s decade ran from January 1, 1670, to December 31, 1679.

== Events ==
=== 1670 ===
==== January–March ====
- January 17 – Raphael Levy, a Jewish resident of the city of Metz in France, is burned at the stake after being accused of the September 25 abduction and ritual murder of a child who had disappeared from the village of Glatigny. The prosecutor applies to King Louis XIV for an order expelling all 95 Jewish families from Metz, but the king refuses.
- January 27 – The Muslim emperor Aurangzeb of the Mughal Empire in India issues an order for the destruction of all Hindu temples and schools in the empire, including the Keshvadeva Temple in Mathura.
- February 4 – The Battle of Sinhagad takes place in India (in the modern-day Maharashtra state) as the Maratha Empire army, led by Tanaji Malusare, leads an assault on the Kondhana Fortress that had been captured by the Mughal Empire. Tanaji, called "The Lion" by his followers, captures the fortress by guiding the successful scaling of the walls of the fortress with ladders created from rope, but is killed in the battle. The Maratha emperor Shivaji orders the fortress named Sinhagad, the Marathi language words for "Lion's Fort".
- February 9 – Christian V becomes the king of Denmark-Norway upon the death of his father, Frederick III.
- February 27 – The royal wedding in Poland, between King Michal Wisniowiecki (who is also the Grand Duke of Lithuania) and Eleonore of Austria (daughter of the late Ferdinand III, Holy Roman Emperor), with ceremonies taking place at the Denhoff Palace in Kruszyna.
- March 7 – Oliver Plunkett, the Roman Catholic Archbishop of Armagh since 1669, is allowed to return to Ireland for the first time in more than 22 years, after a new policy of tolerance of Catholicism is enacted in England. Plunkett had departed for Rome in 1647 during the Cromwellian conquest of Ireland. Executed in 1681 on false charges of plotting an invasion of Ireland, Plunkett is canonized as a saint of the Roman Catholic Church in 1975.
- March 15 – The first English settlers arrive at the modern-day U.S. state of South Carolina, at this time the Province of Clarendon carved out of the Province of Carolina, and construct a settlement at Albemarle Point on the Ashley River.
- March 18 – Petar Zrinski, the Viceroy of Croatia within the Holy Roman Empire, issues a proclamation urging Croatians to rebel against the Habsburg rulers. The uprising fails and Zrinski and his brother-in-law, Krsto Frankopan, are quickly arrested. Both are beheaded in Vienna on April 30, 1671.
- March 31 – The British warship HMS Sapphire is wrecked beyond repair when her captain, John Pearce, orders the ship to be run aground at Sicily while fleeing what he believes to be four Algerian pirate ships, rather than attempting to fight. The ships turn out to have been friendly, and Pearce and his lieutenant, Andrew Logan, are court-martialed for their cowardice and executed on September 17.

==== April–June ====
- April 18 – King Christian V of Denmark fires Christoffer Gabel, who had been the corrupt chief adviser to King Frederick III, and replaces him with Peder Griffenfeld.
- April 29 – After more than four months, the papal conclave to elect a successor to the late Pope Clement IX selects Cardinal Emilio Albieri with 56 of the 59 votes. Altieri, 79 years old at the time, remains the oldest person ever to be elected pope. He announces that he will take the name of Pope Clement X in honor of Clement IX, who had made him a cardinal. He serves for six years until his death in 1676 shortly after his 86th birthday.
- May 2 – The Hudson's Bay Company is granted a royal charter in England with the jurisdiction to control administration and commerce in "Rupert's Land", governed for the crown by Rupert, Duke of Cumberland, the cousin of King Charles II. The land is a 1.5 million square mile area of what is now Canada around Hudson Bay. The area controlled covers all of the modern province of Manitoba, most of Saskatchewan, and significant portions of Alberta and Nunavut, as well as parts of what are now Ontario and Quebec, and parts of the U.S. states of Minnesota, North Dakota and Montana.
- May 23 – Cosimo III de' Medici becomes the Grand Duke of Tuscany, at the time an independent nation in Italy, upon the death of his father Ferdinando de' Medici.
- June 1 – At Dover, England, Charles II of England and Louis XIV of France sign the Secret Treaty of Dover, ending hostilities between their kingdoms. Louis will give Charles 200,000 pounds annually. In return Charles will relax the laws against Catholics, gradually re-Catholicize England, support French policy against the Dutch Republic (leading England into the Third Anglo-Dutch War), and convert to Catholicism himself. The treaty is ratified three days later. The terms will not become public until the early 19th century. Louis is represented in the negotiations by Charles' sister Princess Henrietta, Duchess of Orléans, who dies suddenly soon after returning to France.
- June 9 – Taking advantage of a monsoon, the Maratha Empire's Shivaji orders an attack on areas that had been turned over to the Mughal Empire and its emperor Aurangazeb in 1665. Within 15 days, the cities of Pune, Baramati, Supi and Indapur, along with the Rohida fort, are recaptured by the Maratha Army.
- June 10 – King Louis XIV of France issues an ordinance prohibiting the French colonies in the Americas from trading with any other nation except France.
- June 15 – The first stone of Fort Ricasoli is laid down in Malta.

==== July–September ====
- July 11 – Representatives of England (led by King Charles II) and Denmark (led by King Christian V) sign a treaty of alliance and commerce, the Treaty of Copenhagen.
- July 18 (July 8, O.S.) – The Treaty of Madrid, also known as the Godolphin Treaty, is signed between England and Spain to formally end hostilities left over from the Anglo-Spanish War, in the Caribbean, that ended ten years earlier. For the first time, Spain acknowledges that it is not entitled to all territory in the Americas west of Brazil, as provided by the 1493 line of demarcation decreed by Pope Alexander VI, and by the 1494 Treaty of Tordesillas between Spain and Portugal. Spain acknowledges that Jamaica and the Cayman Islands are English possessions.
- August 17 – A joint fleet of warships from England (commanded by Commodore Richard Beach on HMS Hampshire) and from the Dutch Republic (led by Admiral Willem Joseph van Ghent on Spiegel) rescue 250 Christian slaves and then sink six Algerian pirate ships in a battle in the Mediterranean Sea off of the coast of Morocco at Cape Spartel.
- August 26 – The Parliament of France enacts a uniform criminal code for the nation with the passage of the Criminal Ordinance of 1670, which takes effect on January 1. The code remains in force until October 9, 1789, when it is abrogated during the French Revolution.
- mid-August – Three Spanish frigates from Spanish Florida, sailing from St. Augustine and under the command of Juan Menendez Marques, arrive at Charleston harbor, preparing to attack the English settlement in South Carolina. The English settlers have been warned in advance by Indians who had found out about the invasion. Because of a storm, and the English preparations for a siege, Captain Menendez abandons the colony without attempting an attack.
- September 5 – William Penn and William Mead are found not guilty of violating the Conventicles Act 1670, after a five day jury trial in London. The two had been arrested on August 14 in front of a meeting house Gracechurch Street after preaching a Quaker sermon outside following a ban on preaching indoors. The defiance by the jury leads to the landmark English decision in Bushel's Case.

==== October–December ====
- October 3 – In India, Chhatrapati Shivaji maharaj, the ruler of the Maratha Empire, leads an attack on the British settlement at Surat near Bombay. British Governor Gerald Aungier secures the British fortress at Surat and saves the lives and property of British citizens.
- October 14 – Le Bourgeois gentilhomme, a five-act comedy and ballet authored by Molière, is given its first performance, presented before King Louis XIV at the Château de Chambord. Public performances begin on November 23 at the Théâtre du Palais-Royal in Paris.
- October 18 – The Battle of Kitombo takes place in southwest Africa in Angola, when colonial soldiers of the Army of Portugal invade Soyo, an independent BaKongo kingdom, with the intent of annexing it to Portuguese West Africa. The 400 Portuguese troops, led by João Soares de Almeida, encounter a stiff resistance. Soyo's Estevao da Silva, whose army has the benefit of weapons supplied by the Dutch Republic, is joined in battle by troops from the neighboring Kingdom of Ngoyo on the other side of the Congo River. General Soares de Almeida is killed, and most of his troops die or are captured; Soyo's General da Silva is killed in the process of winning the battle. Because of the defeat, Portugal makes no further attempt to conquer Soyo or Ngoyo.
- November 24 – Louis XIV of France inaugurates the construction of Les Invalides, a veterans' hospital in Paris.
- December 15 – Henry Morgan, a Welsh privateer in English service, recaptures Santa Catalina Island, Colombia.
- December 27 – Henry Morgan captures Fort San Lorenzo, on Panama's Caribbean coast.
- December 31 – The expedition of John Narborough leaves Corral Bay having surveyed the coast and lost four hostages to the Spanish.

==== Date unknown ====
- Stenka Razin begins the rebellion of Cossacks in Russia.
- Niani, capital of the Mali Empire, is sacked by the Bambara people of the emerging Segou Empire.
- The first French settlers arrive on the Petite Côte of modern-day Senegal.

=== 1671 ===
==== January–March ====
- January 1 – The Criminal Ordinance of 1670, the first attempt at a uniform code of criminal procedure in France, goes into effect after having been passed on August 26, 1670.
- January 5 – The Battle of Salher is fought in India as the first major confrontation between the Maratha Empire and the Mughal Empire, with the Maratha Army of 40,000 infantry and cavalry under the command of General Prataprao Gujar defeating a larger Mughal force led by General Diler Khan.
- January 17 – The ballet Psyché, with music composed by Jean-Baptiste Lully, premieres before the royal court of King Louis XIV at the Théâtre des Tuileries in Paris.
- January 28 – Henry Morgan's Panama expedition – the city of Nuestra Señora de la Asunción de Panamá, founded more than 150 years earlier at the Isthmus of Panama by Spanish settlers and the first permanent European settlement on the Pacific Ocean, is destroyed by the Welsh pirate Henry Morgan. The last surviving original structures are now part of Panama City, capital of the Central American nation of Panama.
- February 1 – The Tsar Alexis of Russia marries Nataliya Kyrillovna Naryshkina, who gives birth 16 months later to the future Peter the Great.
- February 27 – The Ortenau meteorite lands in Germany.
- March 3 – Pomone, written by Robert Cambert and considered by modern scholars to be the first French opera, is given its first performance. Using innovative costumes, and machinery for special stage effects, the premiere performed by the Académie d'Opéra at the Salle de la Bouteille theater in Paris is a success.
- March 11 – The Danish West India Company, a charter ship company whose operations include human trafficking of African slaves to the Western Hemisphere by its Danish Africa Company subsidiary, is founded.
- March 15 – A tornado kills more than 600 people in the city of Cádiz in Spain.
- March 22 – Sabine baronets title is created in England for John Sabine.
- March 31 – England's Royal Navy launches its first warship to have a frame reinforced by iron bars rather than an all wooden ship, an innovation by naval architect Anthony Deane. The state of the art, 102-gun ship is commissioned on January 18, 1672, as the flagship for Admiral Edward Montagu but is sunk less than five months later in the Battle of Solebay. Iron-framed ships are not attempted again for almost 50 years.
- March – In the Battle of Saraighat in India, fought in mid-March, General Lachit Borphukan of the Ahom kingdom, located in what is now the Indian state of Assam defeats a larger force of Mughal Empire troops on the outskirts of what is now Guwahati.

==== April–June ====
- April 2 – In Rome, Pope Clement X canonizes Rose of Lima, making her the first Catholic saint of the Americas.
- May 9 – Thomas Blood, disguised as a clergyman, attempts to steal the Crown Jewels of the United Kingdom from the Tower of London. He is immediately caught, because he is too drunk to run with the loot. He is later condemned to death, and then mysteriously pardoned and exiled by King Charles II.
- June 7 – The coronation ceremony of Christian V of Denmark-Norway takes place at the Frederiksborg Castle in Hillerød, north of Copenhagen. Christian had assumed the throne on February 9, 1670, upon the death of his father, Frederick III.
- June 22 – The Ottoman Empire declares war on Poland.

==== July–September ====
- July 24 – Awashonks, the female sachem who leads the Sakonnet Indians in what is now the U.S. state of Rhode Island, signs a peace agreement with the English leaders of the neighboring Plymouth Colony (now part of Massachusetts), along with chiefs Totatomet, Tattacommett and Somagaonet.
- August 15 – Jamaica's Governor Thomas Lynch offers a general pardon to pirates who are willing to come under Jamaican jurisdiction.
- September 6 – The Court of King Charles II of England dispatches a letter to the "King of Formosa" (Zheng Jing, ruler of the Kingdom of Tungning) confirming that English ships will be welcome to trade at the "City of Tywan", referring to Taipei on the island of Taiwan.

==== October–December ====
- October 25 – Italian-born French astronomer Giovanni Domenico Cassini discovers Iapetus, the second known moon of the planet Saturn. Christiaan Huygens had discovered the Saturnian moon Titan on March 25, 1655.
- October 30 – The Republic of Venice and the Ottoman Empire sign a treaty delineating the borders between their territories in modern-day Greece, with Venice acknowledging the loss of the island of Crete in the Cretan War.
- November 8 – Dionysius IV, bishop of Larissa, is elected as the Ecumenical Patriarch of Constantinople, leader of the Eastern Orthodox Christians, after Parthenius IV is sent into exile.
- November 9 – The Duke of York's Theatre is opened in London by the players of the Duke's Company, rivals to the "King's Company" at the Theatre Royal, which burns down two months later. The site is now the Dorset Garden Theatre.
- November 18 – In southwest Africa, troops of the Army of Portugal, under the command of Luís Lopes de Sequeira, win the Battle of Pungo Andongo, capturing the fortress capital of the Kingdom of Ndongo after nine months and deposing King Ngola Hari. The kingdom is annexed into the Portuguese colony of Angola.
- November 19 – Lê Gia Tông, age 10, is installed as the figurehead Emperor of Vietnam (a kingdom known as Đại Việt or Annam) by the warlord Trịnh Tạc, after the death, three days earlier, of Lê Huyền Tông. He reigns until his death on April 3, 1675.
- December 7 – The first Seventh Day Baptist church in America is founded with a service on a Saturday at Newport, Rhode Island, by Stephen Mumford and four Sabbatarians who believed that Christian church services should be held on Saturday, the seventh and last day of the week, in keeping with the commandment of remembering the Sabbath.
- December 30 – The Académie royale d'architecture is founded by Louis XIV of France in Paris as the world's first school of architecture.

==== Undated ====
- The first Jewish families settle in Berlin, moving from Vienna at the invitation of Frederick William, Elector of Brandenburg.

=== 1672 ===
==== January–March ====
- January 2 – After the government of England is unable to pay the nation's debts, King Charles II decrees the Stop of the Exchequer, the suspension of payments for one year "upon any warrant, securities or orders, whether registered or not registered therein, and payable within that time, excepting only such payments as shall grow due upon orders on the subsidy, according to the Act of Parliament, and orders and securities upon the fee farm rents, both which are to be proceeded upon as if such a stop had never been made." The money saved by not paying debts is redirected toward the expenses of the upcoming war with the Dutch Republic, but the effect is for the halt by banks for extending further credit to the Crown. Before the end of the year, the suspension of payments is extended from December 31 to May 31, and then to January 31, 1674.
- January 11 – The Royal Society of London for Improving Natural Knowledge, national science academy for England, elects Isaac Newton to its membership, and then demonstrates Newton's reflecting telescope to King Charles II.
- January 13 – Pope Clement X issues regulations for the prerequisites of removing relics of Roman Catholic saints from sacred cemeteries, requiring advance approval from the Cardinal Vicar in Rome before the remains of the saint can be allowed for view. The Cardinal Vicar is directed to bar regular persons from viewing remains, and to limit inspection to high prelates and to princes.
- January 25 – The Theatre Royal, located at the time on Bridges Street in London, burns down. A replacement structure is built on Drury Lane in 1674.
- February 16 (February 6, 1671 O.S.) – Isaac Newton sends a paper for publication regarding his experiments on the refraction of light through glass prisms and makes the first identification of the "primary colors" of visible light on the electromagnetic spectrum, reporting that "The Original or primary colours are, Red, Yellow, Green, Blew, and a Violet-purple, together with Orange, Indico, and an indefinite variety of Intermediate gradations."
- February 25 – Willem, Prince of Orange, the 21-year-old Stadtholder of Gelderland and Utrecht, is approved by the States General of the Dutch Republic to command the Dutch States Army for the impending war with England.
- March 12 – Action of 12 March 1672, a 2-day naval engagement between an English coastal patrol and a Dutch Smyrna convoy off the south coast of England. The English fleet suffers severe damage while most of the Dutch convoy escapes, although one of the Dutch commanders (De Haaze) is killed and one warship taken as a prize (Klein Hollandia) sinks; the latter will be rediscovered in 2019.
- March 15 – Charles II of England issues the Royal Declaration of Indulgence, suspending execution of Penal Laws against Protestant nonconformists and Roman Catholics in his realms; this will be withdrawn the following year under pressure from the Parliament of England.
- March 16 – At the Synod of Jerusalem, presided over by Dositheos II of Jerusalem, the 68 bishops and representatives from the whole of Eastern Orthodox Christendom close by approving the Orthodox dogma against the challenge of Protestantism, declaring against "the falsehoods of the adversaries which they have devised against the Eastern Church" and making a goal of "reformation of their innovations and for their return to the catholic and apostolic church in which their forefathers also were."
- March 17 – The Third Anglo-Dutch War begins as the Kingdom of England declares war on the Dutch Republic.

==== April–June ====
- April 8 – France declares war on the Dutch Republic, invading the country on April 29.
- May 2 – John Maitland becomes Duke of Lauderdale and Earl of March.
- June 1 – Münster and Cologne begin their invasion of the Dutch Republic; hence 1672 becomes known as het rampjaar ("the disaster year") in the Netherlands.
- June 7 – Third Anglo-Dutch War – Battle of Solebay: An indecisive sea battle results, between the Dutch Republic, and the joined forces of England and France.
- June 12 – Battle of Tolhuis: French forces under King Louis XIV cross the Rhine into the Netherlands; the city of Utrecht is occupied by the French Army.

==== July–September ====
- July 4 – William III of Orange is appointed Stadtholder of Holland and Zeeland.
- August 20 – Johan de Witt, Grand Pensionary of Holland and his brother Cornelis de Witt are killed by an Orangist mob in The Hague.
- September 10 – William III of Orange, Stadtholder of the Dutch Republic, dismisses nine of the regenten who lead cities in the Netherlands, after being granted authority by the States-General.
- September 15 – In India, Admiral Mai Nayak Bhandari of the Maratha Empire captures the island of Khanderi.
- September 16 – The Board of Trade is created in England by a merger of the Council of Trade and the Council of Foreign Plantations, both of which had been created by King Charles II in 1660, under the name The Board of Trade and Plantations. The Earl of Shaftesbury is appointed as the first Lord of Trade, administering the Board until its dissolution in 1676.
- September 26 – General Raimondo Montecuccoli, commander of the army of the Holy Roman Empire, joins forces with the Brandenburg troops commanded by Frederick William, Elector of Brandenburg and the two groups assemble at Halberstadt, to attack the French and the bishops of Münster and Cologne.

==== October–December ====
- October 2 – Manuel de Cendoya, Spain's Governor of Florida, breaks ground for the construction of the Castillo de San Marcos, a masonry fortress designed to protect St. Augustine. Governor Cendoya follows on November 9 with the ceremonial laying for the first stone for the foundation.
- October 18 – The Treaty of Buchach, between the Ottoman Empire and the Polish–Lithuanian Commonwealth, is signed.
- November 24 – Five-year-old Sikandar Adil Shah is enthroned as the last Sultan of Bijapur (located in southwestern India in what is now the Karnataka state) upon the death of his father, the Sultan Ali Adil Shah II. In 1686, the sultanate of Bijapur is conquered and annexed by the Mughal Empire.
- November 28 – After more than five years of administration of the Treasury of England by a five-member commission, Lord Clifford of Chudleigh, one of the commission members, becomes the Lord High Treasurer of England.
- December 18
  - Hedwig Eleonora of Holstein-Gottorp ends her regency of the Swedish Empire after more than 12 years, having exercised power in the name of her minor son, Charles XI, since the death of her husband Karl X Gustav in 1660. Hedwig Eleonora had served as the chair of the six-member Regency Council.
  - An English invasion force captures the Caribbean island of Tobago from Dutch colonists and destroys the settlement.
- December 23 – French astronomer Giovanni Domenico Cassini discovers Rhea, a previously-unknown satellite of the planet Saturn. Rhea is the second-largest overall, and the third moon of Saturn to be discovered by Earth astronomers, Titan having been found by Christiaan Huygens on March 25, 1655 and Iapetus by Cassini on October 25, 1671.
- December 30 – Troops of the Dutch Republic, under the command of Carl von Rabenhaupt, are able to reclaim lost territory for the first time in the Third Anglo-Dutch War, liberating Coevorden, which had been forced to surrender to France on July 1. The moment, a boost for morale in what is remembered in Dutch history as the Rampjaar (the "Disaster Year"), is later memorialized in a painting by Pieter Wouwerman, The Storming of Coevorden.

==== Undated ====
- Richard Hoare becomes a partner in the London goldsmith's business which, as private banking house C. Hoare & Co., will survive through to the 21st century.
- Foundation of the Chorina Comedy, the first theater in Russia.

=== 1673 ===
==== January–March ====
- January 22 – Impersonator Mary Carleton is hanged at Newgate Prison in London, for multiple thefts and returning from penal transportation.
- February 10 – Molière's comédie-ballet The Imaginary Invalid premiers in Paris. During the fourth performance, on February 17, the playwright, playing the title rôle, collapses on stage, dying soon after.
- March 29 – Test Act: Roman Catholics and others who refuse to receive the sacrament of the Church of England cannot vote, hold public office, preach, teach, attend the universities or assemble for meetings in England. On June 12, the king's Catholic brother, James, Duke of York, is forced to resign the office of Lord High Admiral because of the Act.

==== April–June ====
- April 27 – Cadmus et Hermione, the first opera written by Jean-Baptiste Lully, premières at the Paris Opera in France.
- May 17 – In America, trader Louis Joliet and Jesuit missionary-explorer Jacques Marquette begin exploring the Mississippi River and the Great Lakes.
- June 7 – First Battle of Schooneveld: In a sea battle of the Third Anglo-Dutch War, fought off the Netherlands coast, the Dutch Republic fleet (commanded by Michiel de Ruyter) defeats the allied Anglo-French fleet, commanded by Prince Rupert of the Rhine.
- June 14 – Second Battle of Schooneveld: The Dutch fleet again defeats the joint Anglo-French fleet.
- June 17 – French explorers Father Jacques Marquette and Louis Joliet reach the headwaters of the Mississippi River, and descend to Arkansas.

==== July–September ====
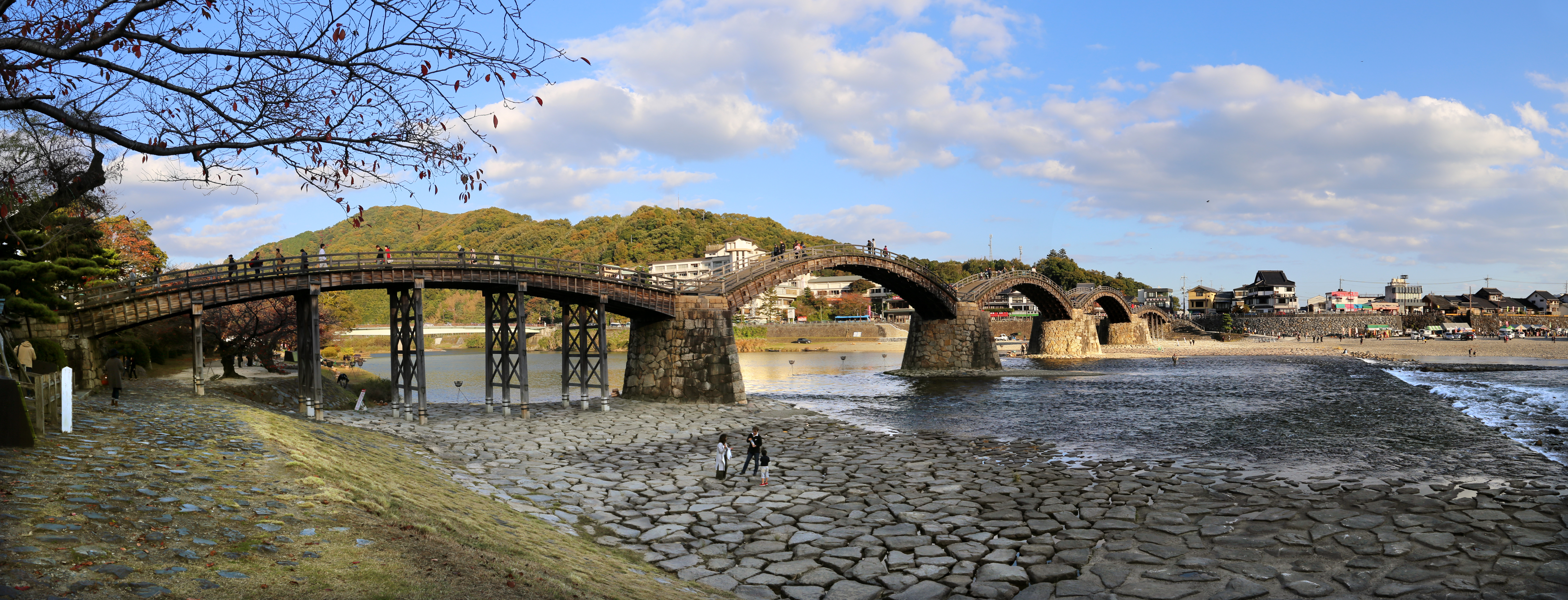
Kintai Bridge officially complete in Japan on October 3

- July 6 – French troops conquer Maastricht.
- July 11 – The Netherlands and Denmark-Norway sign a defense treaty.
- July 24 – Edmund Halley enters The Queen's College, Oxford, as an undergraduate.
- August 8 – In the American colonies, a Dutch battle fleet of 23 ships demands the surrender of New York.
- August 9 – Dutch forces under Admiral Cornelis Evertsen the Youngest recapture New York from the English; the city is known as New Orange until regained by the English in 1674.
- August 21 – Battle of Texel (Kijkduin): The Dutch fleet under Michiel de Ruyter defeats the English and French fleet. This prevents England's Blackheath Army from landing in Zeeland.
- August 30 – Leopold I, Holy Roman Emperor, Spain, Netherlands and the Lutherans form an anti-French covenant.
- September 12 – William, Prince of Orange occupies Naarden, Netherlands.

==== October–December ====
- October 3 – Kintai Bridge is officially completed in Iwakuni, Suō Province (modern-day Yamaguchi Prefecture), Japan.
- November 9 – King Charles II of England removes Anthony Ashley Cooper, 1st Earl of Shaftesbury, from his position as Lord Chancellor.
- November 11 – Battle of Khotyn: Polish and Lithuanian military units, under the command of soon-to-be-king Jan Sobieski, defeat the Turkish army. In this battle, which takes place one day after the death of Poland and Lithuania's monarch, Michał Korybut Wiśniowiecki, the rockets invented by Kazimierz Siemienowicz are successfully used.
- November 13 – Dutch troops commanded by Raimondo Montecuccoli and William, Prince of Orange conquer Bonn.
- November 14 – Christopher Wren is knighted in England.
- November 23 – James, Duke of York, marries Mary of Modena; they meet for the first time immediately before the ceremony in Dover.
- December 8 – Pedro Nuño Colón de Portugal dies only five days after arriving in Mexico City to take office as the new viceroy of New Spain. He is replaced on December 13 by Payo Enríquez de Rivera, the former Roman Catholic Archbishop of Mexico.
- December 19 – King Louis XIV of France issues a decree recognizing the legitimacy of (and giving royal titles to) the three children whom he had sired through his mistress, the Marquise de Montespan: Louis Auguste, Duke of Maine; Louis César, Count of Vexin; and Louise Françoise de Bourbon, Princess of Condé.
- December 28 – In China, General Wu Sangui begins the Revolt of the Three Feudatories, a rebellion against the Qing dynasty by killing the Governor of the Yunnan province, Zhu Guozhi. Within 10 days, he leads troops on an expedition to take over the neighboring Guizhou province and by 1676 controls 11 of China's provinces.

==== Date unknown ====
- France begins its expedition against Ceylon.
- Chelsea Physic Garden, the second oldest botanic garden in England, is founded by the Society of Apothecaries, for the study of medicinal and other plants.
- The Mitsui family's trading and banking house is founded in Japan.
- The stalactic grotto of Antiparos (Aegean Sea) is discovered.
- Archpriest Petrovich Avvakum writes his Zhitie (Life), as the first Russian autobiography.

=== 1674 ===
==== January–March ====
- January 2 – The French West India Company is dissolved after less than 10 years.
- January 7 – In the Chinese Empire, General Wu Sangui leads troops into the Giuzhou province, and soon takes control of the entire territory without a loss.
- January 15 – The Earl of Arlington, a member of the English House of Commons, is impeached on charges of popery, but the Commons rejects the motion to remove him from office, 127 votes for and 166 against.
- January 19 – The tragic opera Alceste, by Jean-Baptiste Lully, is performed for the first time, presented by the Paris Opera company at the Theatre du Palais-Royal in Paris.
- February 19 – England and the Netherlands sign the Treaty of Westminster, ending the Third Anglo-Dutch War. Its provisions come into effect gradually (see November 10).
- March 14 – Third Anglo-Dutch War: Battle of Ronas Voe – The English Royal Navy captures the Dutch East India Company ship Wapen van Rotterdam in Shetland.

==== April–June ====
- April 10 – In the Ahom kingdom in what is now the northeastern Indian state of Assam, Chamaguriya Khamjang Konwar is installed by the Chief Minister, the Borbarua Debera, as the figurehead King of Ahom. He takes the regnal name Suhung and makes plans to have Debera killed. On April 30, Debera, having learned of the King's intentions, succeeds in having the royal physician poison Suhung's medicine, and installs another ruler.
- April 24 – In India, Shivaji Bhonsale, the Chhatrapati of the Maratha Empire, captures the Kenjalgad Fort in what is now the Maharashtra state.
- April 26 – In the Netherlands, the jurisdiction of Willem, Prince of Orange, Stadtholder of Holland (on the west coast, including Amsterdam and Rotterdam) and Zeeland (southwest coast, including Middelburg, Zeeland), increases in the Dutch Republic as his followers in the inland States of Utrecht (Utrecht, Gelderland and Overijssel) designate him as the hereditary stadtholder. In 1689, he becomes the King of England in addition to his role as the Stadtholder of the Netherlands.
- May 21 – John III Sobieski is elected by the nobility, as King of the Polish–Lithuanian Commonwealth (to 1696).
- June 6 – Shivaji Maharaj is crowned as Chatrapati Shivaji Maharaj of the Maratha Empire at Raigad Fort in India.
- June 12 – The British East India Company arranges a commercial treaty with the Maratha Empire after Henry Oxenden, the company's deputy governor, meets Emperor Shivaji for his recent coronation.

==== July–September ====
- July 4 – A Dutch fleet under Cornelis Tromp Captures the island of Noirmoutier on the French coast. For nearly three weeks, the Dutch occupied the French island and the Dutch fleet captured many French ships in the meantime. The whole coastline from Brest to Bayonne was in turmoil, and French forces gathered to prevent the Dutch from landing. On 23 July the island of Noirmoutier was however abandoned after the Dutch blew up the castle and demolished the coastal batteries.
- July 7 – The Messina revolt against Spanish rule begins on the island of Sicily as the Italian residents besiege the palace of the Spanish Captain-General and drive out the Spanish garrison.
- July 16 – In a major battle in the Third Anglo-Dutch War, a large fleet of 18 warships from the Dutch Republic, along with 15 troop transports, nine storeships and 3,400 soldiers, arrives at the island of Martinique in the Caribbean Sea for the purpose of invasion and capture of Martinique from the French colonists. Admiral Michiel de Ruyter, commander of the Dutch forces, waits for four days before coming ashore. The French defenders, under the direction of the Governor, Antoine André de Sainte-Marthe, take advantage of the situation to block the entrances to the harbor and to reinforce troops. The Dutch invasion force is forced to retreat after sustaining heavy losses.
- July 17 – Two skeletons of children are discovered by workmen repairing a staircase at the White Tower (Tower of London), and believed at this time to be the remains of the Princes in the Tower. The urns containing the bones are interred in 1678 in Westminster Abbey, with an inscription in Latin that states "Here lie interred the remains of Edward V, King of England, and Richard, Duke of York, whose long desired and much sought after bones, after over a hundred and ninety years, were found interred deep beneath the rubble of the stairs that led up to the Chapel of the White Tower, on the 17 of July in the Year of Our Lord 1674."
- August 11 – The French army under Louis II de Bourbon, Prince de Condé fights the Dutch–Spanish–Imperial army under William III of Orange at Seneffe in a very bloody, but inconclusive battle.
- September 17 – Sukjong of the Joseon Dynasty, age 13, becomes the new Emperor of Korea upon the death of his father, the Emperor Hyeonjong. Sukjong reigns for more than 45 years until his death on July 12, 1720.
- September 27 – French Navy Commander Jean-Baptiste de Valbelle arrives at Sicily during the Messina revolt to help the Messinese expel the last Spanish defenders, taking the fort at Faro in the harbor entrance.

==== October–December ====
- October 4
  - The Battle of Entzheim takes place in France with 35,000 Holy Roman Empire troops and 22,000 French defenders during the Franco-Dutch War, with the forces fighting near Entzheim south of Strasbourg. While the battle is inconclusive, the outnumbered French win a strategic victory by keeping the Germans from entering French territory. Most of the former battlefield now lies beneath the Strasbourg International Airport.
  - A second coronation is held by the Maratha Empire for the Chhatrapati Shivaji Bhonsle, after the Vedic priest Nischal Puri Goswami decides that the June 18 coronation was "held under inauspicious stars".
- October 15 – The Torsåker witch trials begin in the Torsåker Parish in Sweden, with over 100 men and women accused of witchcraft and the abduction of children. On June 1, 1675, the mass beheading of the 71 people convicted takes place at Häxberget, 65 of whom are women. The others are two men and four boys.
- October 27 – The town of Grave surrenders to a Dutch army after a difficult siege.
- November 10 – As provided in the Treaty of Westminster of February 19, the Dutch Republic cedes its colony of New Netherland to England. This includes the colonial capital, New Orange, which is returned to its English name of New York. The colonies of Surinam, Essequibo and Berbice remain in Dutch hands.
- December 4 – Father Jacques Marquette, along with Pierre Poteret and Jacque Poteret, sails southward along the shore of Lake Michigan, accompanied by nine canoes of Indians from the Potawatomi tribe, and comes ashore at what is now Chicago. The three missionaries, the first Europeans to explore the area, camp there for the winter. Marquette notes in his journal "The land bordering it is of now value, except on the prairies," and adds "There are eight to ten quite fine rivers." A historical marker is now erected on the site of the landing. Father Marquette founds a mission (which will in time grow into the city of Chicago) on the shores of Lake Michigan, in order to create a Christian ministry to convent Native Americans in the Illinois Confederation.

==== Date unknown ====
- The first Dutch West India Company is dissolved.

=== 1675 ===
==== January–March ====
- January 5 – Franco-Dutch War – Battle of Turckheim: The French defeat Austria and Brandenburg.
- January 29 – John Sassamon, an English-educated Native American Christian, dies at Assawampsett Pond, an event which will trigger a year-long war between the English American colonists of New England, and the Algonquian Native American tribes.
- February 4 – The Italian opera La divisione del mondo, by Giovanni Legrenzi, is performed for the first time, premiering in Venice at the Teatro San Luca. The new opera, telling the story of the "division of the world" after the battle between the Gods of Olympus and the Titans, becomes known for its elaborate and expensive sets, machinery, and special effects and is revived 325 years later in the year 2000.
- February 6 – Nicolò Sagredo is elected as the new Doge of Venice and leader of the Venetian Republic, replacing Domenico II Contarini, who had died 10 days earlier.
- February 11 – French Army Marshal Louis Victor de Rochechouart, Count of Vivonne, reinforces the rebels in the Messina revolt with eight additional warships and three fireships to bring to 20 the number of ships that France has against the 15 warships of Spain, and breaks the Spanish blockade that had prevented food from reaching Messina.
- February 25 – Netherlands scientist Christiaan Huygens files drawings of his invention of the balance spring, the key component to the accuracy of portable clocks and pocket watches, in a letter to the Journal des Sçavants.
- February 27 – Matthew Locke's "semi-opera" Psyche premieres at the Duke's Theatre in London.
- March 4 – John Flamsteed is appointed by King Charles II as England's "astronomical observator", in effect, becoming the first Astronomer Royal.
- March 25 – England's first royal yacht, HMY Mary, strikes rocks off of the coast of Anglesey while traveling from Dublin to Chester with 74 passengers and crew, and quickly sinks, with the loss of 35 people. The other 39 are able to get to safety. The wreckage is not discovered until almost 300 years later, on July 11, 1971.
- March 30 – The guild organisation Maîtresses couturières is founded in Paris.

==== April–June ====
- April 13 – King Charles II of England suspends Parliament after just nine weeks when the members refuse to vote additional funding to him.
- April 20 – An uprising by the Chahars in the Chinese Empire region of Inner Mongolia, led by brothers Abunai Khan and Lubuzung Khan with 3,000 followers, is harshly put down by Imperial troops of the Manchu dynasty. Survivors of the battle, part of the Revolt of the Three Feudatories, are put to death.
- April 27 – Lê Hy Tông becomes the new Emperor of Vietnam at the age of 12, after being appointed as a figurehead by the warlord Trịnh Tạc upon the death of Lê Gia Tông.
- April – English merchant Anthony de la Roché, blown off course after rounding Cape Horn eastabout, makes the first discovery of land south of the Antarctic Convergence, landing on South Georgia and (probably) Gough Island.
- May 6 – The Siege of Ponda, an action by the Maratha Empire in southern India against the Sultanate of Bijapur, ends after four weeks when the Mughal Empire fails to send reinforcements. Most of the defenders are massacred after Emperor Shivaji's troops storm the fortress in what is now a small city in the Indian state of Goa.
- May 15 – After an invasion and attempt to take over the German principality of Brandenburg, the army of Sweden makes its first conquest, forcing the surrender of the fortress at Löcknitz.
- May 18 – Misirliohlu Ibrahim Pasha becomes the new ruler of Tripolitania, a province of the Ottoman Empire at the time and now part of the North African nation of Libya. He reigns for 19 months as the Beylerbey of Tripoli.
- May 23 – Sujinphaa becomes the new figurehead monarch of the Ahom kingdom in northeastern India, enthroned at the capital at Garhgaon (now in the Indian state of Assam), after Gobar Roja is deposed and executed by order of the nobles who control the nation.
- June 1 – The Torsåker witch trials is concluded in Sweden with the execution of 71 people (65 of them women) executed on the same day at the village of Häxberget. The condemned prisoners are beheaded and their bodies are then burned.
- June 8 – John Sassamon's alleged murderers are executed at Plymouth, Massachusetts.
- June 11 – Armed Wampanoag warriors are reported traveling around Swansea, Massachusetts.
- June 14 – Colonial authorities of Rhode Island, Plymouth, and Massachusetts attempt a negotiation with Metacomet (King Philip), leader of the Wampanoags, and seek guarantees of fidelity from the Nipmuck and Narragansett tribes. The negotiations end after 11 days, closing on June 25.
- June 21 – Reconstruction of St Paul's Cathedral begins in London under the direction of Christopher Wren, to replace the portion destroyed by the Great Fire of London nine years earlier.
- June 24 – King Philip's War breaks out, as the Wampanoags attack Swansea.
- June 26 – The Wampanoag warriors begin a three-day assault on English colonial towns in the Massachusetts Bay Colony in North America, with an assault on the villages of Rehoboth and Taunton. At the same time, Massachusetts troops march to Swansea, to join the Plymouth Colony troops. The warriors elude colonial troops and leave Mount Hope for Pocasset, Massachusetts. The Mohegan tribe travels to Boston, in order to assist the English colonists against the Wampanoags.
- June 28 – Brandenburg defeats the Swedish Army in the Battle of Fehrbellin.

==== July–September ====
- July 15 – The Narragansett tribe signs a peace treaty with Connecticut.
- July 16–24 – An envoy from Massachusetts attempts to negotiate with the Nipmuck tribe.
- August 2–4 – The Nipmucks attack Massachusetts troops and besiege Brookfield, Massachusetts.
- August 10 – King Charles II of England places the foundation stone of the Royal Greenwich Observatory near London; construction begins.
- August 13 – The Massachusetts Council orders that Christian Indians are to be confined to designated praying towns.
- September 1–2 – While Wampanoags and Nipmucks attack Deerfield, Massachusetts, Captain Samuel Moseley commands Massachusetts troops in an attack on the Pennacook tribe.
- September 12 – English colonists abandon Deerfield, Squakeag, and Brookfield due to a coalition of Indian attacks.
- September 15 – The Bremen-Verden Campaign of the Northern Wars begins, with the invasion of Amt Wildeshausen by the Münster army, and their advance on Verden via the city of Bremen.
- September 18 – The Narragansetts sign a treaty with the English in Boston; meanwhile, Massachusetts troops are ambushed near Northampton, Massachusetts.
- September 20 – In England, a fire destroys most of the town of Northampton. According to a contemporary account, "the market place (which was a very goodly one), the stately church of Allhallows, 2 other parish churches and above three-fourth parts of the whole town was consumed and laid in ashes.".

==== October–December ====
- October 5 – The Pocomtuc tribe attacks and destroys the English settlement at Springfield, Massachusetts.
- October 13 – The Massachusetts Council convenes and agrees that all Christian Indians should be ordered to move to Deer Island.
- October 29 – Gottfried Leibniz makes the first use of the long s (∫) as a symbol of the integral in calculus.
- November 2 – Commissioners of the Massachusetts Bay Colony and the Plymouth Colony (which are later merged into Massachusetts) begin a 10-day discussion on organizing a united force to attack the Narragansett tribe.
- November 11
  - Guru Teg Bahadur, ninth of the Sikh gurus, is executed by Mughal rulers, proclaiming that he prefers death rather than disavowing the right of Hindus to practice their own religion. He is succeeded by Guru Gobind Singh, who becomes the tenth Guru.
  - Gottfried Leibniz makes the earliest known use of infinitesimal calculus in the breaking down of a function.
- December 11 – Antonio de Vea expedition enters San Rafael Lake in western Patagonia.
- December 19 – United colonial forces attack the Narragansetts at the Great Swamp Fight.
- December 24 – 1675–1676 Malta plague epidemic begins.

==== Date unknown ====
- Giovanni Cassini discovers the Cassini Division in the rings of Saturn.
- Antonie van Leeuwenhoek begins to use a microscope for observing human tissues and liquids.

=== 1676 ===
==== January–March ====
- January 29 – Feodor III becomes Tsar of Russia.
- January 31 – Universidad de San Carlos de Guatemala, the oldest institution of higher education in Central America, is founded.
- January – Six months into King Philip's War, Metacomet (King Philip), leader of the Algonquian tribe known as the Wampanoag, travels westward to the Mohawk nation, seeking an alliance with the Mohawks against the English colonists of New England; his efforts in creating such an alliance are a failure.
- February 10 – After the Nipmuc tribe attacks Lancaster, Massachusetts, colonist Mary Rowlandson is taken captive, and lives with the Indians until May.
- February 14 – Metacomet and his Wampanoags attack Northampton, Massachusetts; meanwhile, the Massachusetts Council debates whether a wall should be erected around Boston.
- February 23 – While the Massachusetts Council debates how to handle the Christian Indians they had exiled to Deer Island on October 13, 1675, a coalition of Indians led by Metacomet attacks colonial settlements just 16 km (9.9 mi) outside of Boston.
- March 29 – Providence, Rhode Island is attacked and destroyed by Native Americans.

==== April–June ====
- April 2 – Chief Canonchet of the Narragansett people is captured by mercenaries of the Pequot, Mohegan and Niantic nations who have been hired by English settlers. He is offered a chance to live if he makes peace with the English, refuses, and is executed the next day in Stonington, Connecticut.
- April 12 – Richard Raynsford becomes the new Lord Chief Justice of England and Wales.
- April 21 – Sudbury Fight: The village of Sudbury, Massachusetts is attacked by Metacom's Wampanoag Confederation as one of the last major battles of King Phillip's War. Captain Samuel Wadworth and 28 of his men are killed in the defense of the town.
- April 22 – The Battle of Augusta is fought in the Mediterranean Sea off of the coast of Sicily during the Franco-Dutch War. The French Navy and the combined Dutch Republic and Spanish forces each lose over 500 men.
- May 2 – Mary Rowlandson is ransomed from captivity by Native Americans by a subscription raised by women of Boston.
- May 19 – Peskeomskut Massacre: Battle of Turner's Falls – Captain William Turner leads a raid at first light on an encampment consisting mainly of women and children. An estimated 300-400 lives are taken in less than half an hour, first from gunshot directly into the sleeping tents, then by sword and by drowning as the victims try to flee. This incident happens on the west bank of the Connecticut River, just above the falls known as Turner's Falls in Gill, Massachusetts.
- May 26 – A fire destroys the town hall and 624 houses in Southwark, London.
- May 31 – The Massachusetts Council finally decides to move the Christian Indians from Deer Island to Cambridge, Massachusetts (approximate date).
- June 1 – Scanian War: Battle of Öland – A combined fleet of the Dutch Republic and Denmark–Norway decisively defeats the Swedish Navy, which loses its flagship Kronan.
- June 12 – The Indian coalition attacks Hadley, Massachusetts, but are repelled by Connecticut troops.
- June 19 – Massachusetts issues a declaration of amnesty to any Indian who surrenders.
- June – Bacon's Rebellion begins in the Virginia Colony. On July 30, Nathaniel Bacon and his followers issue the Declaration of the People of Virginia.

==== July–September ====
- July 2 – Major John Talcott and his troops begin sweeping Connecticut and Rhode Island, capturing large numbers of Native Americans from Algonquian tribes and exporting them out of the English colonies as slaves.
- July 4 – Captain Benjamin Church and his soldiers begin sweeping Plymouth Colony, for any remaining Wampanoag tribesmen.
- July 11 – The Wampanoags attack Taunton, Massachusetts, but are repelled by colonists.
- July 17 – In France, Madame de Brinvilliers is executed for poisoning her father and brothers. The case also scares King Louis XIV into starting a series of investigations about possible poisonings and witchcraft (later called the Affair of the Poisons).
- July 27 – Nearly 200 Nipmuc tribesmen surrender to the English colonists in Boston.
- July 30 – Virginia colonist Nathaniel Bacon and his makeshift army issue a Declaration of the People of Virginia, instigating Bacon's Rebellion against the rule of Governor William Berkeley.
- August 2 – Captain Benjamin Church captures Metacomet's wife and son.
- August 12 – King Philip (Metacomet), chief of the Wampanoags that had waged a war throughout southern New England that bore his name, is killed by an Indian named Alderman, a soldier led by Captain Benjamin Church.
- August 17 – Battle of Halmstad (fought at Fyllebro): Sweden gains a decisive victory over Denmark–Norway.
- August 28 – The Irish Donation of 1676 is shipped from Dublin, to relieve Boston in the Massachusetts Bay Colony.
- September 19
  - The Russo-Turkish War (1676–1681) begins, with Russo-Ukrainian troops forcing pro-Ottoman Hetman Ivan Samoylovych to surrender Chyhyryn.
  - Bacon's Rebellion: Jamestown is burned to the ground by the forces of Nathaniel Bacon.
- September 21 – Pope Innocent XI succeeds Pope Clement X, as the 240th Pope of the Roman Catholic Church.

==== October–December ====
- October 13 – Battle of Gegodog: Trunajaya defeats the Mataram Sultanate.
- October 17 – The Treaty of Żurawno is signed, between the Ottoman (Turkish) Empire and Polish–Lithuanian Commonwealth.
- November 16 – A prison is founded on Nantucket Island, in the English colony of Massachusetts.
- November 27 – A fire in Boston, Massachusetts, is accidentally set by a careless and sleepy apprentice, who drops a lighted candle, or leaves it too near some combustible substance; this is the largest fire known at this time in the district. The Rev. Increase Mather’s church, dwelling and a portion of his personal library are destroyed.
- December 4 – Scanian War – Battle of Lund: Sweden defeats the forces of Denmark.
- December 7 – Ole Rømer makes the first quantitative measurements of the speed of light.
- December 21 – Sands baronets created in the Baronetage of Ireland.

==== Date unknown ====
- Emperor Yohannes I of Ethiopia decrees that Muslims must live separately from Christians throughout his realm.
- Anton van Leeuwenhoek discovers microorganisms.
- An Åbo Lantdag (assembly) meets in Turku, Finland.
- The French East India Company founds its principal Indian base at Pondicherry, on the Coromandel Coast.
- The first coffeehouse in North America opens in Boston.

=== 1677 ===
==== January–March ====
- January 1 – Jean Racine's tragedy Phèdre is first performed, in Paris.
- January 21 – The first medical publication in America (a pamphlet on smallpox) is produced in Boston.
- February 15 – Four members of the English House of Lords embarrass King Charles II at the opening of the latest session of the "Cavalier Parliament" by proclaiming that the session is not legitimate because it had not met in more than a year. The Duke of Buckingham, backed by Lord Shaftesbury, Lord Salisbury and Baron Wharton, makes an unsuccessful motion to end the session. When the four Lords refuse to apologize, they are arrested and imprisoned in the Tower of London.
- February 26
  - The first arrests are made in the case that will develop into the "Affair of the Poisons" in France, as Magdelaine de La Grange and her accused accomplice, Father Nail, are detained on suspicion of poisoning her lover, a Messr. Faurie. While in prison in the Bastille and awaiting trial Mademoiselle La Grange writes letters accusing other persons of carrying out murders by poison as well.
  - On the Indonesian island of Java, Amangkurat II of the Mataram Sultanate agrees to bring his kingdom under the protection of the Dutch East India Company to drive out rebels.
- February 28 – During the Franco-Dutch War, the Siege of Valenciennes by the French Army begins in the Spanish Netherlands (modern-day Belgium). The city surrenders on March 17.
- March 17 – Franco-Dutch War: Siege of Valenciennes (1676–77) in the Spanish Netherlands ends with surrender of the town to the French.

==== April–June ====
- April 6 – Leopold I, Holy Roman Emperor visits the University of Innsbruck.
- April 11 – Franco-Dutch War: Battle of Cassel – A French force under Philippe I, Duke of Orléans, defeats a combined Dutch-Spanish force under William of Orange in French Flanders.
- April 16 – The Statute of Frauds is passed into English law.
- May 29 – The Treaty of Middle Plantation establishes peace between the Virginia colonists and the local Indians.
- May 31 – Scanian War: Battle of Møn – Danish ships clash with a Swedish fleet under Niels Juel, between Fehmarn and Warnemünde; the Danish defeat the Swedish and capture a number of ships.
- June 25–26 – Scanian War: Siege of Malmö – Danish attackers fail to take the town from the Swedish.

==== July–September ====
- July 14 – Battle of Landskrona: Sweden and its 13,000 troops, under the command of King Charles XI, successfully repel a 12,000-man invasion force from Denmark, commanded by King Christian V.
- August 14 – William of Orange, the leader of the Dutch Republic, is forced to end the siege of the Spanish Netherlands (modern-day Belgium) city of Charleroi after six days.
- August 28 – During war between the Russian Empire and the Ottoman Empire, Russian troops led by Grigory Romodanovsky and Ukrainian Cossacks led by Ivan Samoylovych arrive at the besieged Ukrainian city of Chigirin (modern-day Chyhyryn) and inflict heavy casualties on the encamped Turkish and Tatar troops. Ibrahim Pasha, leader of the 45,000 member Ottoman force, retreats the next day and, by the time of the relief of Chigirin on September 5, the Ottoman Army has lost 20,000 men. Ottoman Sultan Mehmed IV, outraged by the defeat, sends 200,000 troops the following year and destroys the city.
- August – The French guild of the Maitresses bouquetieres is founded in Paris.
- September 10 – Henry Purcell is appointed a musician to the court of Charles II of England.
- September 17 – Troops from Denmark invade and capture the Swedish island of Rügen and drive out the local population. Five months later, on January 18, 1678, Sweden recaptures the island. Nine months later, troops from Denmark and Brandenburg invade for a third time and capture the island again on October 22, 1678. Eight months later, Denmark is given the island back under a treaty ending the Swedish-Brandenburg War on June 29, but by then, the island of Rügen is in ruins. In modern times, the island becomes a vacation resort in Germany.
- September 18 – the Kangxi Emperor of China grants titles and ranks to all of his wives, and names Empress Xiaozhaoren as his consort.

==== October–December ====
- October 29 – Michel le Tellier becomes Chancellor of France.
- November 4 – The future Mary II of England marries William of Orange in London.
- November 16 – French troops occupy Freiburg.
- December 7 – Father Louis Hennepin of Belgium, exploring North America, becomes the earliest known European person to discover Niagara Falls, and the first to report its existence. In his book A New Discovery of a Vast Country in America, published in 1698, Hennepin writes "Betwixt the lakes Ontario and Eire there is a vast prodigious Cadence of water which falls down after a surprising and astonishing manner, inasmuch that the Universe does not afford its parallel."
- December 9 – The French Navy, led by Charles de Courbon de Blénac with a land force of 950 men, lands at the Caribbean island of Tobago, lays siege to the Dutch fort defending the territory during the Franco-Dutch War, and destroys the structure when it fires a cannon overlooking the fort, striking the gunpowder arsenal. The explosion kills 250 of the defenders, including Dutch Admiral Jacob Binckes and 16 officers. Combined with the sinking of four ships of the Netherlands Navy, the victory at Tobago ends Dutch military power in the Antilles.
- December 15 – The Siege of Stettin (the modern-day Polish city of Szczecin but, at this time, a possession of Sweden) ends after almost five months with Sweden's surrender of the city to Prussia's Frederick William, Elector of Brandenburg. The siege, part of the Scanian War, had begun on June 25.

==== Date unknown ====
- Yusuf Bey is replaced as sanjak-bey of Lajjun Sanjak by an Ottoman officer, ending the power of the Turabay dynasty.
- The Second London Baptist Confession of Faith is written (published in 1689).
- Spinoza's Ethics (Ethica, ordine geometrico demonstrata) is published as part of his Opera Posthuma in Amsterdam.
- Robert Plot publishes The Natural History of Oxford-shire, Being an Essay Toward the Natural History of England, in which he describes the fossilised femur of a human giant, now known to be from the dinosaur Megalosaurus.
- Elias Ashmole gifts the collection that begins the Ashmolean Museum to the University of Oxford in England.
- Jules Hardouin Mansart begins la place Vendôme in Paris (it is completed in 1698).
- Francis Aungier, 3rd Baron Aungier of Longford, is created 1st Earl of Longford in the Peerage of Ireland.
- The John Roan School is established in Greenwich, London.
- Gottfried Wilhelm Leibniz gives a complete solution to the tangent problem.
- Antonie van Leeuwenhoek observes spermatozoa under the microscope.
- The use of male impotence is ended as a factor in French divorce proceedings.
- Ice cream becomes popular in Paris.
- The population of Paris first exceeds 500,000.

=== 1678 ===
==== January–March ====
- January 10 – England and the Dutch Republic sign a mutual defense treaty in order to fight against France.
- January 27 – The first fire engine company in North America goes into service in Boston.
- February 18 – The first part of English nonconformist preacher John Bunyan's Christian allegory The Pilgrim's Progress is published in London.
- March 21 – Thomas Shadwell's comedy A True Widow is given its first performance, at The Duke's Theatre in London, staged by the Duke's Company.
- March 23 – Revolt of the Three Feudatories in southern China: rebel general Wu Sangui, lord of the Yunnan fief, takes the imperial crown, names himself monarch of "The Great Zhou", based in the Hunan province, with Hengyang as his capital. He contracts dysentery over the summer and dies on October 2, ending the rebellion against the Kangxi Emperor.
- March 25 – The Spanish Netherlands city of Ypres falls after a seven-day siege by the French Army. It is later returned to the Netherlands and eventually becomes part of Belgium.
- March 28 – The nova V529 Orionis is discovered by Polish astronomer Johannes Hevelius (Jan Heweliusz).

==== April–June ====
- April 2 – Ignatius Gregory Peter VI Shahbaddin is enthroned as the Patriarch of the Syriac Catholic Church in Aleppo, after receiving recognition by Ottoman Sultan Mehmed IV and by Pope Innocent XI.
- April 12 – The Treaty of Casco Bay is signed between officials of the Province of New York and the Penobscot tribe and the Wabanaki Confederacy, bringing an end to further fighting that has happened in the two years since the end of King Philip's War in the modern-day U.S. state of Maine. Under the terms of the treaty, English settlers pay rent to the Penobscots and are given back farm land that had been confiscated in the war, while the English settlers agree to respect the Penobscot land rights.
- May 11 – French admiral Jean d'Estrees runs his whole fleet aground in either the Las Aves Archipelago or Isla de Aves, intending to reach Curaçao.
- June 10 – French buccaneer Michel de Grammont arrives at Spanish-held Venezuela with six pirate ships, 13 smaller craft, and 2,000 men in a daring raid on the South American territory, then leads half of his force inward toward Maracaibo, which he takes on June 14. During the rest of the month, he and his soldiers march inland as far as Trujillo. Grammont and his pirates finally depart on December 3.
- June 25 – Elena Lucrezia Cornaro Piscopia becomes the first woman to be awarded a university degree, a doctorate in philosophy from the University of Padua.

==== July–September ====
- July 23 – The Battle of Ortenbach, one of the last major engagements of the Franco-Dutch War, takes place near Offenburg at the Rhine river in southwestern Germany, as French forces under the command of François de Créquy overwhelm a larger force of Holy Roman Empire troops commanded by the Duke of Lorraine, Karl V Leopold.
- July 29 – Muhammad Azam Shah is appointed as the Mughal Governor of Bengal by his father, the Emperor Aurangzeb, but serves for a little more than a year before being recalled from Dhaka.
- August 10 – The Treaties of Nijmegen end the Franco-Dutch War. The County of Burgundy is ceded to the Kingdom of France.
- August 14–15 – The Battle of Saint-Denis is fought after the signing of peace in the Franco-Dutch War.
- August 21 – On the island of Java in modern-day Indonesia, the Kediri campaign begins as Mataram Sultanate and Dutch East India Company (VOC) forces under the command of VOC Captain François Tack begin marching from Jepara toward Kediri to suppress the Trunajaya rebellion that had driven out the Mataram Sultan. They are joined by two other columns of troops over the next fortnight.
- September 5 – Sultan Amangkurat II of Mataram sets off from Jepara with the main force in the Kediri campaign, leading native troops, along with VOC forces under the command of Anthonio Hurdt, leader of the campaign.
- September 6 – Titus Oates begins to present allegations of the "Popish Plot", a supposed Roman Catholic conspiracy to assassinate king Charles II of England. Oates applies the term Tory to those who disbelieve his allegations.
- September 17 – The Franco-Dutch War between the Kingdom of France and the Dutch Republic (and its allies) comes to an end after more than six years as the Treaties of Nijmegen bring about a ceasefire.

==== October–December ====
- October 17 – English magistrate Sir Edmund Berry Godfrey is found murdered in Primrose Hill, London. His death is seen as proof of the "Popish Plot" to the public.
- November 11 (November 1 O.S.) – England's House of Commons votes to begin impeachment proceedings against five Roman Catholic members of the House of Lords, Viscount Stafford, the Marquess of Powis, Baron Arundell, Baron Petre and Baron Belasyse accused by Protestant members as participating in a "Popish Plot". Viscount Stafford is convicted and executed, while the other four are imprisoned in the Tower of London for more than five years.
- November 25 – The Kediri campaign is successfully concluded in Indonesia as Anthonio Hurdt and Sultan Amangkurat II capture Kediri and force the rebel Prince Trunajaya to flee.
- November 26 – William Staley, an English banker and a Roman Catholic, becomes the first person to be executed in connection with the "Popish Plot" arrests.
- December 1 – The Test Act provides that members of both the House of Lords and House of Commons of England must swear an anti-Catholic oath, before taking office.

==== Date unknown ====
- About 1,200 Irish families sail from Barbados to Virginia and the Carolinas.
- In Ireland, the vacant Bishopric of Leighlin is given to the Bishop of Kildare in commendam; it will later be formed into the Roman Catholic Diocese of Kildare and Leighlin.

=== 1679 ===
==== January–March ====
- January 24 – King Charles II of England dissolves the "Cavalier Parliament", after nearly 18 years.
- February 3 – Moroccan troops from Fez are killed, along with their commander Moussa ben Ahmed ben Youssef, in a battle against rebels in the Jbel Saghro mountain range, but Moroccan Sultan Ismail Ibn Sharif is able to negotiate a ceasefire allowing his remaining troops safe passage back home.
- February 5 – The Treaty of Celle is signed between France and Sweden on one side, and the Holy Roman Empire, at the town of Celle in Saxony (in modern-day Germany). Sweden's sovereignty over Bremen-Verden is confirmed and Sweden cedes control of Thedinghausen and Dörverden to the Germans.
- February 19 – Ajit Singh Rathore becomes the new Maharaja of the Jodhpur State a principality in India also known as Marwar, located in the modern-day Rajasthan state.
- March 6 – In England, the "Habeas Corpus Parliament" (or "First Exclusion Parliament") is opened.
- March 12 – Catherine Deshayes Monvoisin, commonly called "La Voisin" and the suspected killer of over 1,000 people in France by poisoning, is arrested outside of the Church of Notre-Dame-de-Bonne-Nouvelle in Paris and imprisoned at Vincennes for the next 11 months. After her conviction, she is publicly burned at the stake on February 22, 1680.

==== April–June ====
- April 3 – Aurangazeb, the Muslim ruler of the Mughal Empire in India, decrees the imposition of the jizya, an annual tax upon non-Muslims under Mughal jurisdiction, primarily Hindus. The tax had been abolished by Aurangazeb's great grandfather, Akbar.
- April 8 – In the Italian region of Piedmont, a landslide causes the village of Bosia to sink into the ground and then get buried, killing 200 inhabitants. The village is then rebuilt at another site and continues to exist.
- April 10 – A total eclipse of the Sun takes place over North America, with its peak over the region occupied by the Lakota Sioux people in modern-day South Dakota.
- May 3 – James Sharp, the Church of Scotland's Archbishop of St Andrews, is assassinated at Magus Muir in Fife, when his coach is ambushed by a group of nine of the Scottish Covenanters. Only two of the assassins, David Hackston and Andrew Guillan, are captured.
- May 27 – The Parliament of England passes the Habeas Corpus Act, "for the better securing the liberty of the subject" and then adjourns.
- June 1 – Battle of Drumclog: A group of 200 Scottish Covenanters overwhelm a small Scottish Army unit, that had been pursuing them for the murder of Archbishop Sharp. The Covenanters, led by 19-year-old William Cleland, kill 36 of the Scottish soldiers.
- June 4 – A 6.4 magnitude earthquake in Armenia strikes near Yerevan, at the time part of the Persian Empire.
- June 22 – Battle of Bothwell Bridge in Scotland: Royal forces led by James Scott, 1st Duke of Monmouth and John Graham of Claverhouse subdue the Scottish Covenanters.

==== July–September ====
- July 12 – In England, the "Habeas Corpus Parliament" (or "First Exclusion Parliament") is dissolved, while in recess, by King Charles II. The King exercises his royal prerogative of dissolution to prevent the parliament from passing a bill that would exclude non-Anglicans from the succession to the English throne, specifically the king's Roman Catholic brother, James, Duke of York, as part of the Exclusion Crisis.
- August 7 – The brigantine Le Griffon, commissioned by René-Robert Cavelier, Sieur de La Salle, is towed to the southern end of the Niagara River, to become the first ship to sail the upper Great Lakes of North America.
- September 2 – The 8.0 M_{w} magnitude Sanhe-Pinggu earthquake devastates Beijing and Hebei in China.
- September 18 – The Province of New Hampshire is separated from the Massachusetts Bay Colony.

==== October–December ====
- October 4 – Bil'arab bin Sultan becomes the new Imam of Oman upon the death of his father, Sultan bin Saif.
- October 6 – Mughal Emperor Aurangzeb returns control of Bengal to the local Nawab of Murshidabad after removing his son, Prince Qutb-ud-Din Muhammad Azam, from the position of Mughal Governor of Dhaka.
- October 12 – Representatives of the Dutch Republic and the Kingdom of Sweden sign the last of the nine Treaties of Nijmegen, ending the last of the conflicts that began during the Franco-Dutch War.
- October 18 – A sea battle is fought between England's Royal Navy and the navy of India's Maratha Empire (under the command of Mai Nayak Bhandari), with English bombardment driving the Maratha occupation of the island fortress at Khanderi (off of the western Indian coast south of Mumbai).
- November 27 – A fire in Boston, Massachusetts, burns all of the warehouses, 80 houses, and all of the ships in the dockyards.
- December 3 – French explorers René-Robert Cavelier, Sieur de La Salle (commonly called "La Salle") and Henri de Tonti set off from their fort near Niagara Falls in North America on the first European expedition to explore the upper Mississippi River.
- December 10
  - More than 200 captives on the ship The Crown of London, all Scottish Covenanters arrested after the battle of Bothwell Bridge, are killed when the ship is wrecked on the Orkney Islands while transporting the group to exile in North America.
  - A peace treaty is signed between Ali Bey al-Muradi, Bey of Tunis; his brother whom he had overthrown in 1678, Muhammad Bey al-Muradi; and their uncle, Muhammad al-Hafsi al-Muradi, the Pasha of Tunis, after mediation by the Dey of Algiers.
- December 16 (December 6 O.S.) – Oliver Plunkett, the Roman Catholic Primate of All Ireland and Archbishop of Armagh, is arrested on false charges of plotting to aid a French invasion of the British Isles, the so-called "Popish Plot". Executed in 1681, Plunkett will be canonized as a Roman Catholic saint almost 300 years later in 1975.
- December 26 – In modern-day Indonesia, the Trunajaya rebellion comes to an end with the surrender of Prince Panembahan Maduretno to the Sultan Amangkurat II of Mataram, ruler of the entire island of Java. While treated with respect as a prisoner of the occupying forces of the Dutch East India Company (Verenigde Oostindische Compagnie or VOC), Panembahan is killed seven days later by Amangkurat after the VOC allows him to attend a ceremonial visit to the sultan's palace.

==== Date unknown ====
- The Tibet–Ladakh–Mughal war (1679–84) begins with the Tibetan invasion of Ladakh.
- French explorer Daniel Greysolon, Sieur du Lhut, explores the Saint Louis River; the city of Duluth, Minnesota, will take its name from him.
- Malpas Tunnel on the Canal du Midi in Hérault, France, Europe's first navigable canal tunnel, is excavated by Pierre-Paul Riquet (169 metres (554 ft), concrete lined).

== Births ==
1670

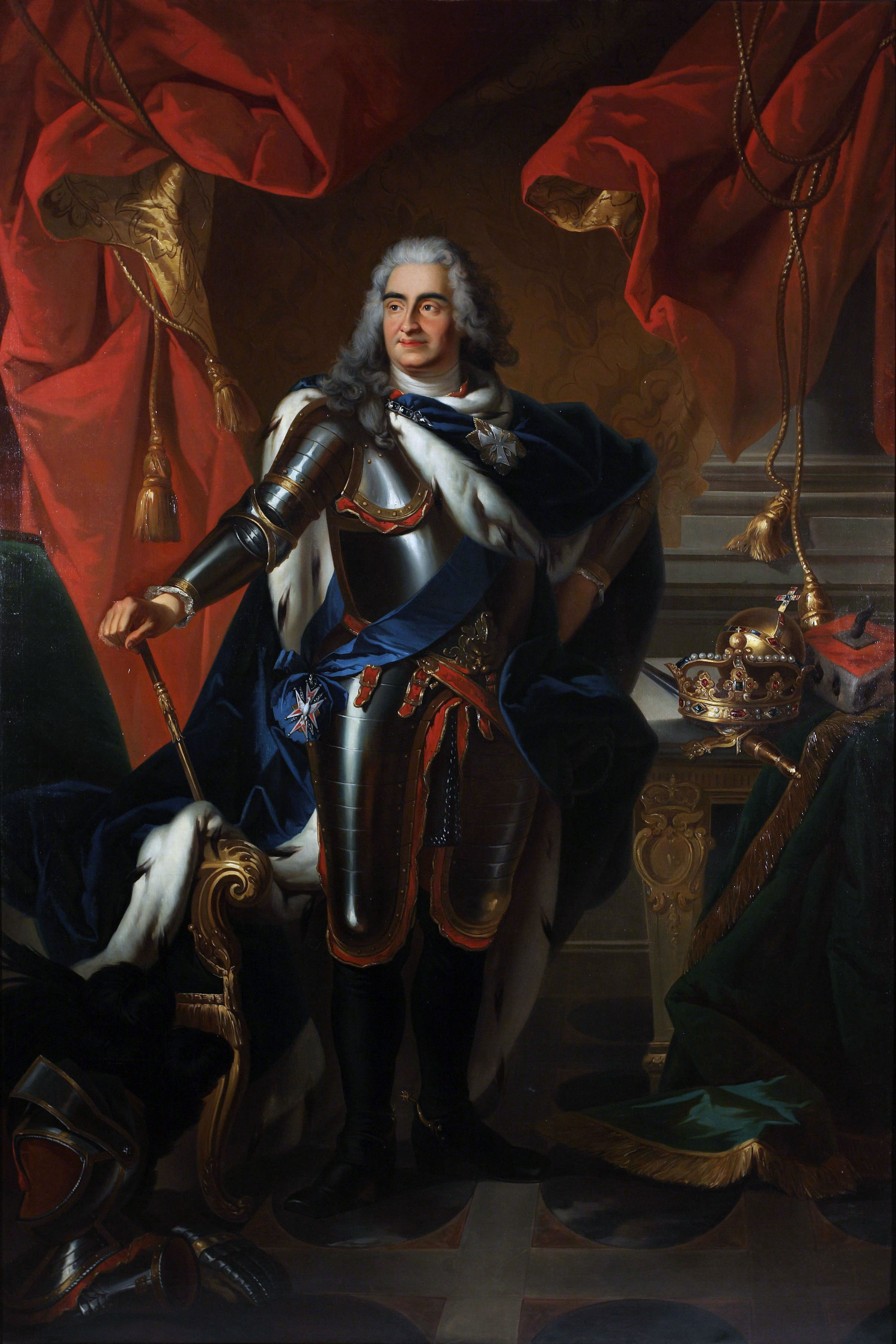
Augustus II the Strong

- January 24 – William Congreve, English playwright (d. 1729)
- February 25 – Maria Margarethe Kirch, German astronomer (d. 1720)
- February 28 – Benjamin Wadsworth, American president of Harvard University (d. 1737)
- May 8 – Charles Beauclerk, 1st Duke of St Albans, English soldier (d. 1726)
- May 12 – King Frederick Augustus I of Poland (d. 1733)
- June 22 – Eva von Buttlar, German mystic sectarian (d. 1721)
- July 18 – Giovanni Bononcini, Italian composer (d. 1747)
- July 19 – Richard Leveridge, English bass player and composer (d. 1758)
- August 21 – James FitzJames, 1st Duke of Berwick, French military commander (d. 1734)
- November 15 – Bernard Mandeville, Dutch-born economic philosopher (d. 1733)
- December 4 – John Aislabie, English politician, director of the South Sea Company (d. 1742)
- date unknown – Sultan Abdullah Khan Abdali, Persian Governor of Herat, Shah of Herat (d. 1721)

1671

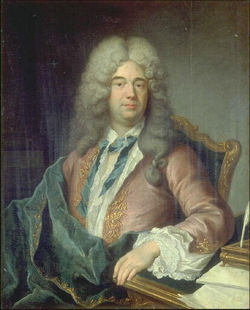
Jean-Baptiste Rousseau

- January 11 – François-Marie, 1st duc de Broglie, French military leader (d. 1745)
- February 26 – Anthony Ashley-Cooper, 3rd Earl of Shaftesbury, English politician and philosopher (d. 1713)
- March 7 – Rob Roy MacGregor, Scottish folk hero (d. 1734)
- April 6 – Jean-Baptiste Rousseau, French poet (d. 1741)
- April 21 – John Law, Scottish economist (d. 1729)
- May 24 – Gian Gastone de' Medici, Grand Duke of Tuscany (d. 1737)
- June 8 – Tomaso Albinoni, Italian composer (d. 1751)
- June 21 – Christian Detlev Reventlow, Danish diplomat and military leader, brother-in-law of king Frederick IV of Denmark (d. 1738)
- July 9 – Margareta von Ascheberg, Swedish land owner, countess and acting regimental colonel (d. 1753)
- July 14 – Jacques d'Allonville, French astronomer and mathematician (d. 1732)
- October 1 – Guido Grandi, Italian mathematician (d. 1742)
- October 11 – King Frederick IV of Denmark (d. 1730)
- November 6 – Colley Cibber, English actor-manager and poet laureate (d. 1757)
- November 15 (bapt.) – Anne Bracegirdle, English actress (d. 1748)

1672

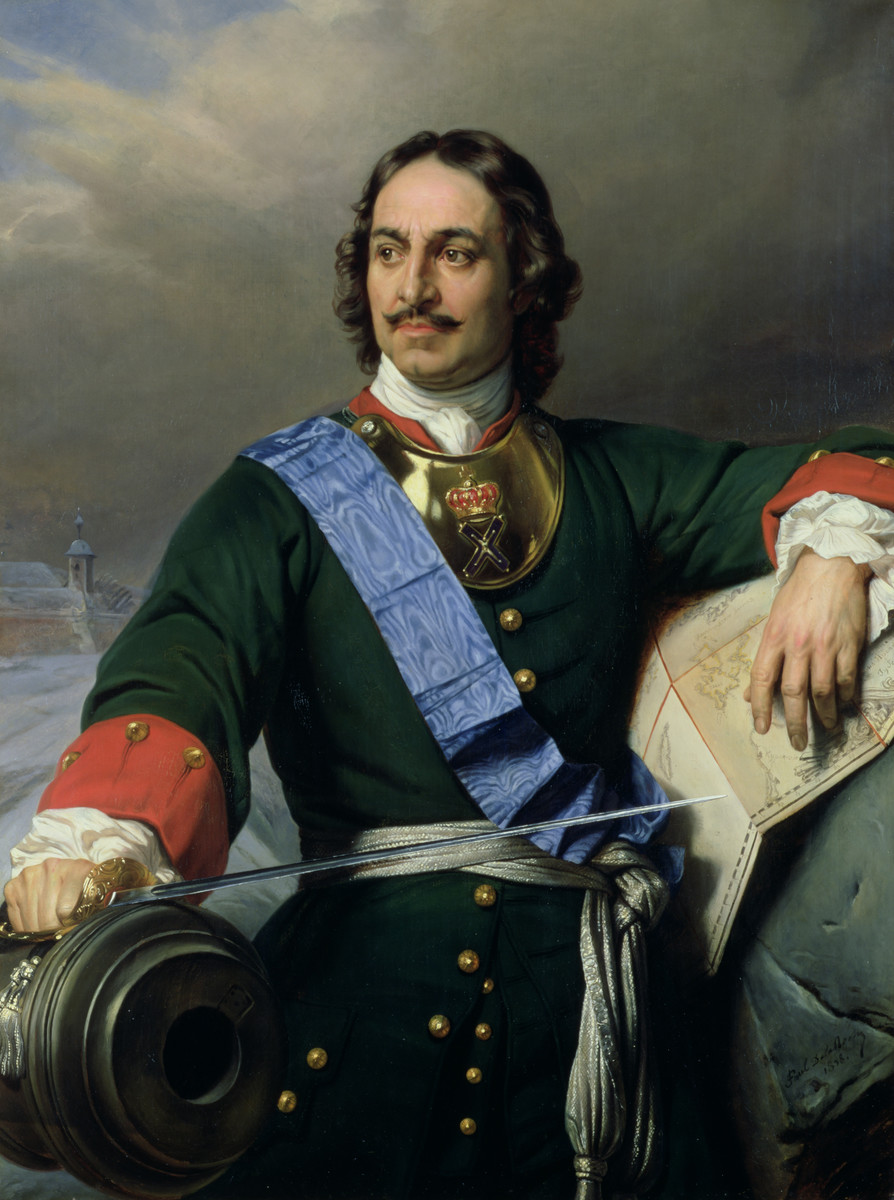
Peter I of Russia

- January 4 – Hugh Boulter, Irish Archbishop of Armagh (d. 1742)
- January 18 – Antoine Houdar de la Motte, French writer (d. 1731)
- February 13 – Étienne François Geoffroy, French chemist (d. 1731)
- February 26 – Antoine Augustine Calmet, French theologian (d. 1757)
- May 1 – Joseph Addison, English politician and writer (d. 1719)
- June 9 – Emperor Peter I of Russia (d. 1725)
- June 11 – Francesco Antonio Bonporti, Italian priest and composer (d. 1749)
- July 13 – Nicolás Salzillo, Spanish artist (d. 1727)
- August 2 – Johann Jakob Scheuchzer, Swiss scholar (d. 1733)
- September 8 – Nicolas de Grigny, French organist and composer (d. 1703)
- October 11 – Pylyp Orlyk, Ukrainian Zaporozhian Cossack starshina, diplomat (d. 1742)
- October 21 – Ludovico Antonio Muratori, Italian historian, scholar (d. 1750)
- October 27 – Maria Gustava Gyllenstierna, Swedish writer (d. 1737)
- date unknown
  - Ann Baynard, English natural philosopher (d. 1697)
  - José Antonio Nebra Mezquita, Spanish organist and harpist (d. 1748)

1673

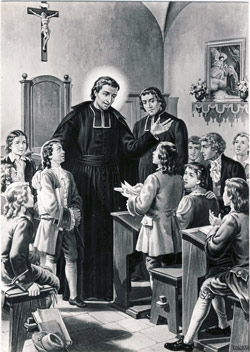
Louis de Montfort

- January 31 – St. Louis Maria Grignion de Montfort, French missionary priest (d. 1716)
- April 27 – Claude Gillot, French artist (d. 1722)
- July 20 – John Dalrymple, 2nd Earl of Stair, Scottish soldier and diplomat (d. 1747)
- August 8 – John Ker, Scottish informer (d. 1726)
- August 10 – Johann Konrad Dippel, German alchemist (d. 1734)
- August 11 – Richard Mead, English physician (d. 1754)
- August 18 – Louise Élisabeth de Joybert, politically active Canadian governors' wife (d. 1740)
- October 26 – Dimitrie Cantemir, Moldavian linguist and scholar (d. 1723)
- December 30 – Ahmed III, Ottoman Sultan (d. 1736)

1674

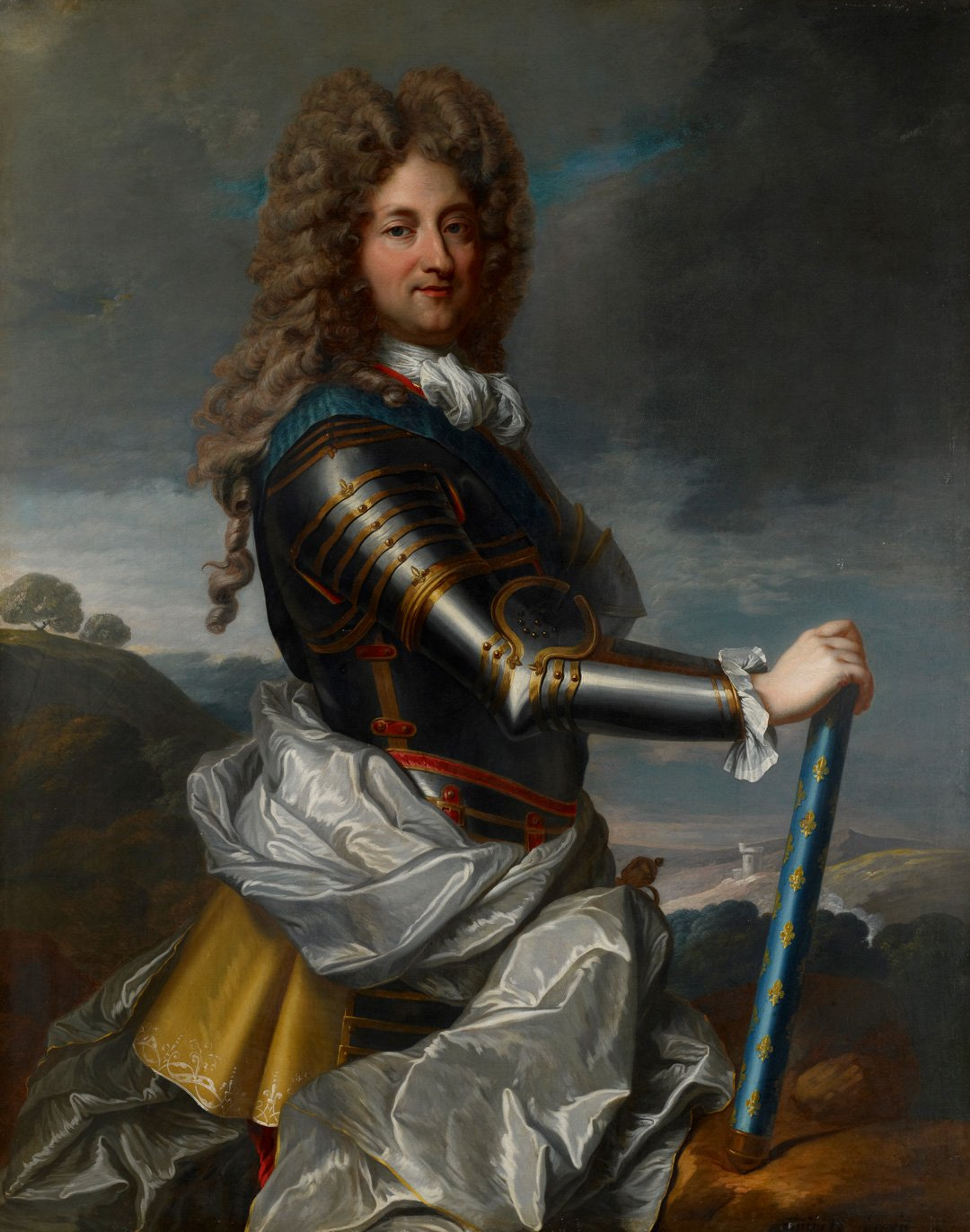
Philippe II, Duke of Orléans

- January 12 – Alexis Simon Belle, French portrait painter (d. 1734)
- January 15 – Prosper Jolyot de Crébillon, French writer (d. 1762)
- January 24 – Thomas Tanner, English bishop and antiquarian (d. 1735)
- March – Jethro Tull, English agriculturist (d. 1741)
- June 3 – Matthias Buchinger, German artist (d. 1740)
- July 12 – Abigail Williams, American accuser in the Salem witch trials (d. 1765)
- July 17 – Isaac Watts, English hymnist (d. 1748)
- August 2 – Philippe II, Duke of Orléans, regent of France (d. 1723)
- August 16 – Catharine Trotter Cockburn, English novelist, dramatist and philosopher (d. 1749)
- August 19 – František Maxmilián Kaňka, Czech architect (d. 1766)
- December 25 – Thomas Halyburton, Scottish theologian (d. 1712)
- Date unknown
  - Jeremiah Clarke, English baroque composer (suicide 1707)
  - Spencer Compton, 1st Earl of Wilmington, Prime Minister of Great Britain (d. 1743)

1675

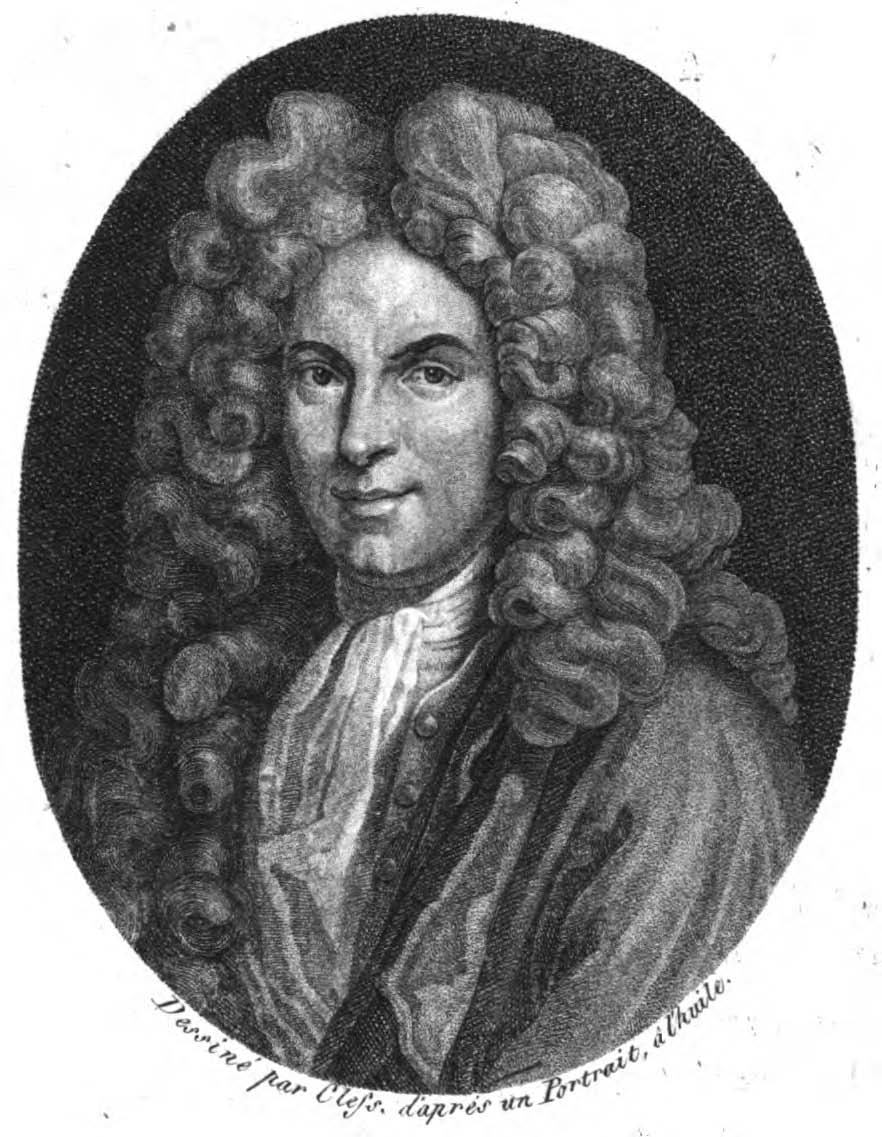
Guillaume Delisle

- January 16 – Louis de Rouvroy, duc de Saint-Simon, French writer (d. 1755)
- January 27 – Erik Benzelius the younger, Swedish priest (d. 1743)
- February 21 – Franz Xaver Josef von Unertl, Bavarian politician (d. 1750)
- February 28 – Guillaume Delisle, French cartographer (d. 1726)
- March 31 – Pope Benedict XIV (d. 1758)
- May 29 – Humphry Ditton, English mathematician (d. 1715)
- June 1 – Francesco Scipione, marchese di Maffei, Italian archaeologist (d. 1755)
- July 5 – Mary Walcott, American accuser at the Salem witch trials
- July 12 – Evaristo Abaco, Italian composer (d. 1742)
- July 14 – Claude Alexandre de Bonneval, French soldier (d. 1747)
- September 2 – William Somervile, English poet (d. 1742)
- September 3 – Paul Dudley, Attorney-General of Massachusetts (d. 1751)
- September 27 – Dorothea Krag, Danish General Postmaster and noble (d. 1754)
- October 11 – Samuel Clarke, English philosopher (d. 1729)
- October 21 – Emperor Higashiyama of Japan (d. 1710)
- October 24 – Richard Temple, 1st Viscount Cobham, English soldier and politician (d. 1749)
- date unknown
  - William Jones, Welsh mathematician (d. 1749)
  - Tarabai, Indian queen regent of the Maratha Empire (d. 1761)
  - Cille Gad, Norwegian poet (d. 1711)

1676

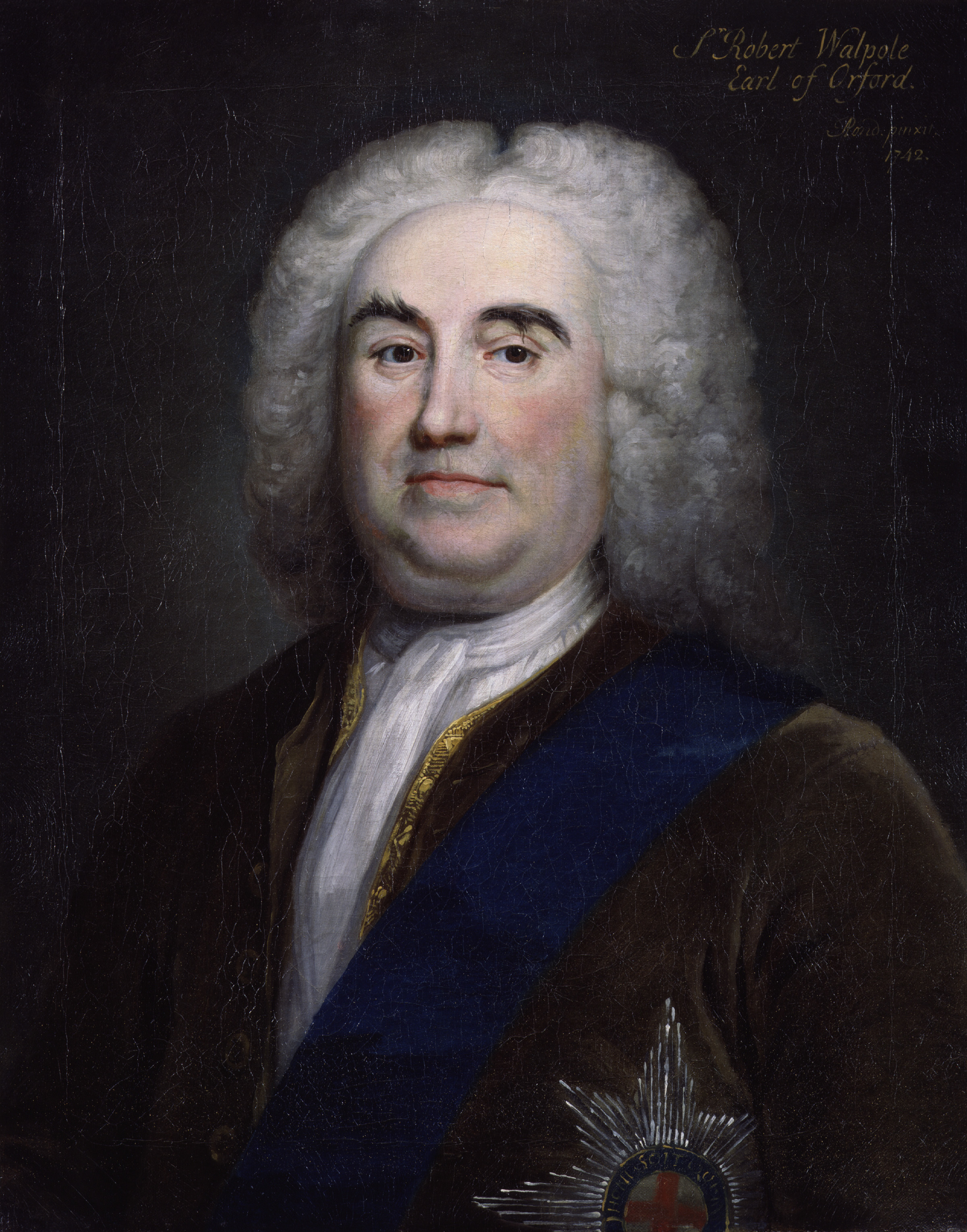
Robert Walpole

- March 17 – Thomas Boston, Scottish church leader (d. 1732)
- March 27 – Francis II Rákóczi, Hungarian rebel against the Habsburgs (d. 1735)
- April 23 – King Frederick I of Sweden (d. 1751)
- May 26 – Maria Clara Eimmart, German astronomer, engraver and designer (d. 1707)
- May 28 – Jacopo Riccati, Italian mathematician (d. 1754)
- June 17 – Louise de Maisonblanche, illegitimate daughter of Louis XIV of France (d. 1718)
- June 21 – Anthony Collins, English philosopher (d. 1729)
- July 3 – Leopold I, Prince of Anhalt-Dessau, Prussian field marshal (d. 1747)
- July 14 – Caspar Abel, German theologian, historian, poet (d. 1763)
- August 26 – Robert Walpole, first Prime Minister of the United Kingdom (d. 1745)
- September 13 – Élisabeth Charlotte d'Orléans, duchess and regent of Lorraine (d. 1744)
- September 18 – Eberhard Louis, Duke of Württemberg (d. 1733)
- October 8 – Benito Jerónimo Feijóo y Montenegro, Spanish scholar (d. 1764)
- October 19 – Rodrigo Anes de Sá Almeida e Meneses, 1st Marquis of Abrantes, Portuguese diplomat (d. 1733)
- November 8 – Louise Bénédicte de Bourbon, duchess of Maine, daughter in law of Louis XIV (d.1753)
- date unknown – Alexander Selkirk, Scottish sailor (d. 1721)

1677

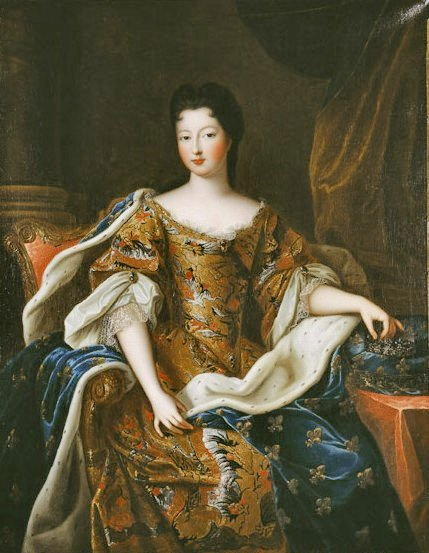
Françoise Marie de Bourbon

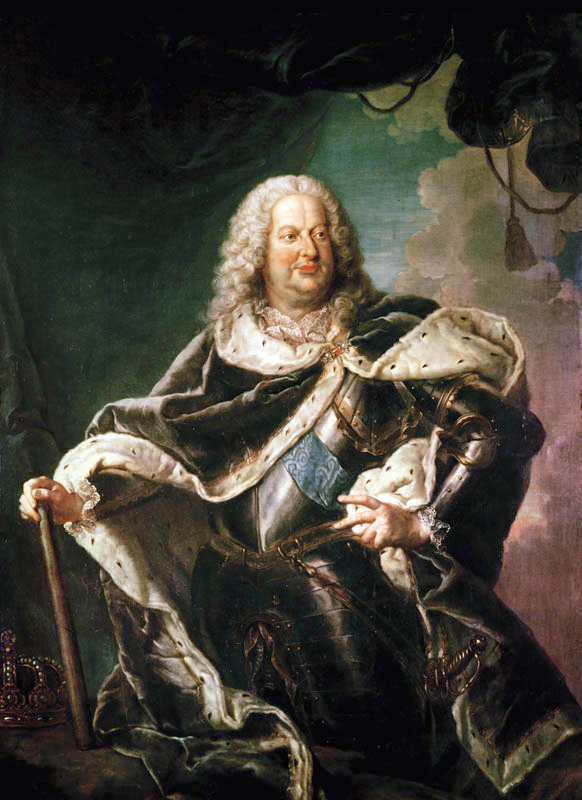
King Stanisław Leszczyński

- February 3 – Jan Santini Aichel, Czech architect (d. 1723)
- February 4 – Johann Ludwig Bach, German composer (d. 1731)
- February 8 – Jacques Cassini, French astronomer (d. 1756)
- May 4 – Françoise-Marie de Bourbon, youngest daughter of Louis XIV (d. 1749)
- August 27 – Otto Ferdinand von Abensperg und Traun, Austrian field marshal (d. 1748)
- September 17 – Stephen Hales, English physiologist, chemist, and inventor (d. 1761)
- October 20 – Stanisław Leszczyński, King of Poland (d. 1766)
- date unknown
  - William Dummer, acting Governor of the Massachusetts Bay Colony (d. 1761)

1678

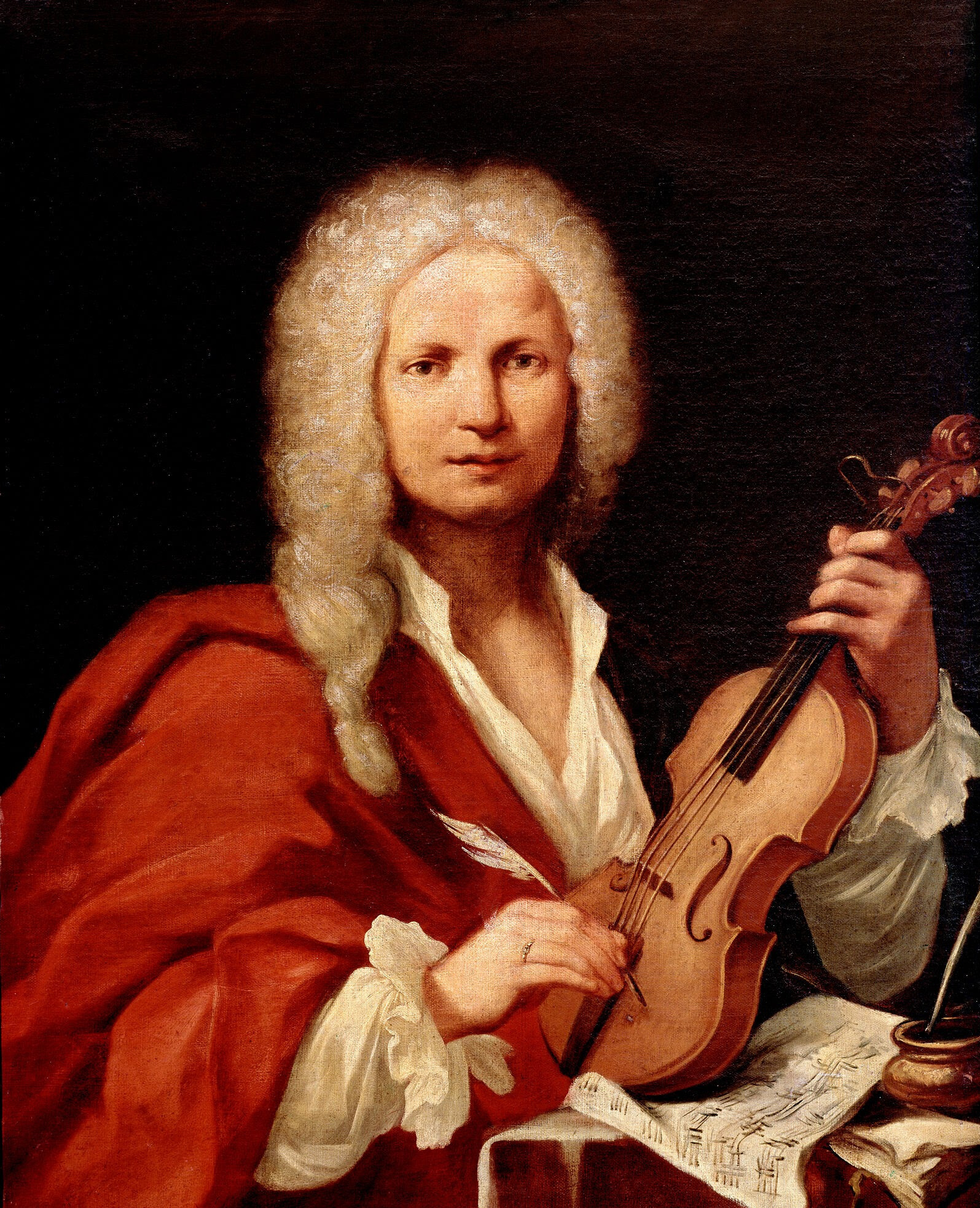
Antonio Vivaldi

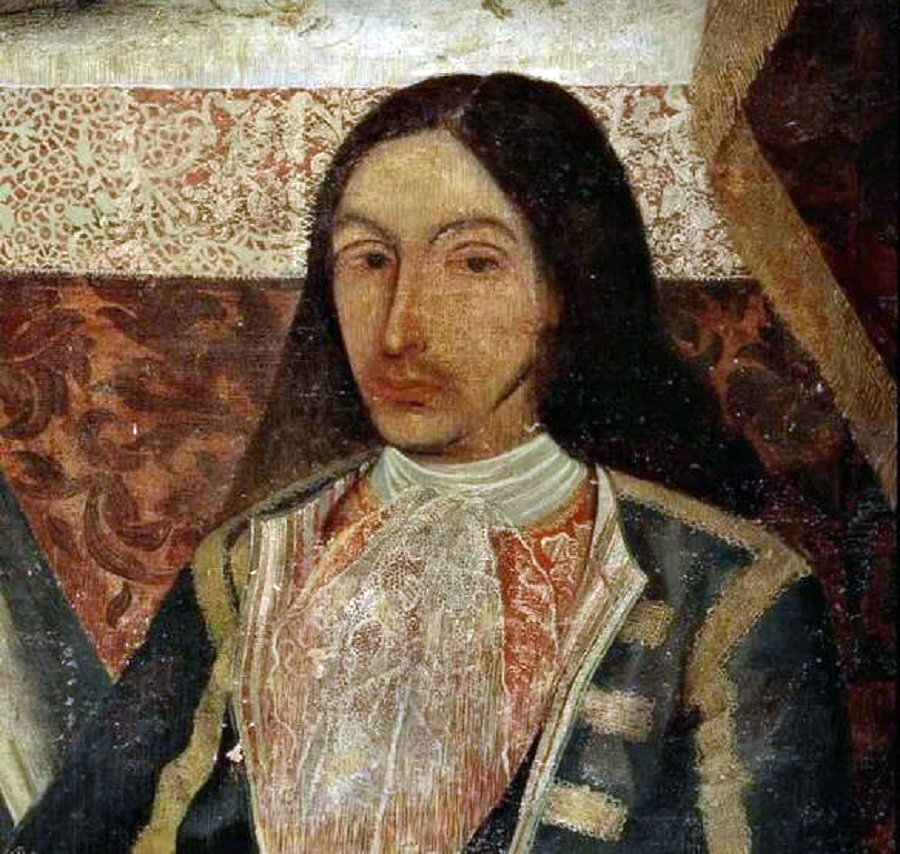
Amaro Pargo

- March 4 – Antonio Vivaldi, Italian composer (d. 1741)
- March 7 – Filippo Juvarra, Italian architect (d. 1736)
- April 14 – Abraham Darby I, one of the English fathers of the Industrial Revolution (d. 1717)
- May 3 – Amaro Pargo, Spanish corsair (d. 1747)
- May 16 – Andreas Silbermann, German organ builder (d. 1734)
- July 26 – Joseph I, Holy Roman Emperor (d. 1711)
- September 16 – Henry St John, 1st Viscount Bolingbroke, English statesman and philosopher (d. 1751)
- September 29 – Adrien-Maurice, 3rd duc de Noailles, French soldier (d. 1766)
- October 10 – John Campbell, 2nd Duke of Argyll, Scottish soldier (d. 1743)
- October 16 – Anna Waser, Swiss painter (d. 1714)
- November 26 – Jean Jacques d'Ortous de Mairan, French geophysicist (d. 1771)
- December 8 – Horatio Walpole, 1st Baron Walpole of Wolterton, English diplomat (d. 1757)
- December 13 – Yongzheng Emperor of China (d. 1735)
- December 14 – Daniel Neal, English historian (d. 1743)
- December 30 – William Croft, English composer (d. 1727)
- date unknown
  - George Farquhar, Irish dramatist (d. 1707)
  - Joachim Ludwig Schultheiss von Unfriedt, German architect (d. 1753)
  - John Senex, British geographer (d. 1740)
  - Maria Faxell, Swedish vicar's wife and war heroine (d. 1738),
  - Pierre Fauchard, French physician and author, considered The father of modern dentistry (d. 1761)
  - Thomas Micklethwaite, Lord Commissioner of the Treasury (d. 1718)

1679

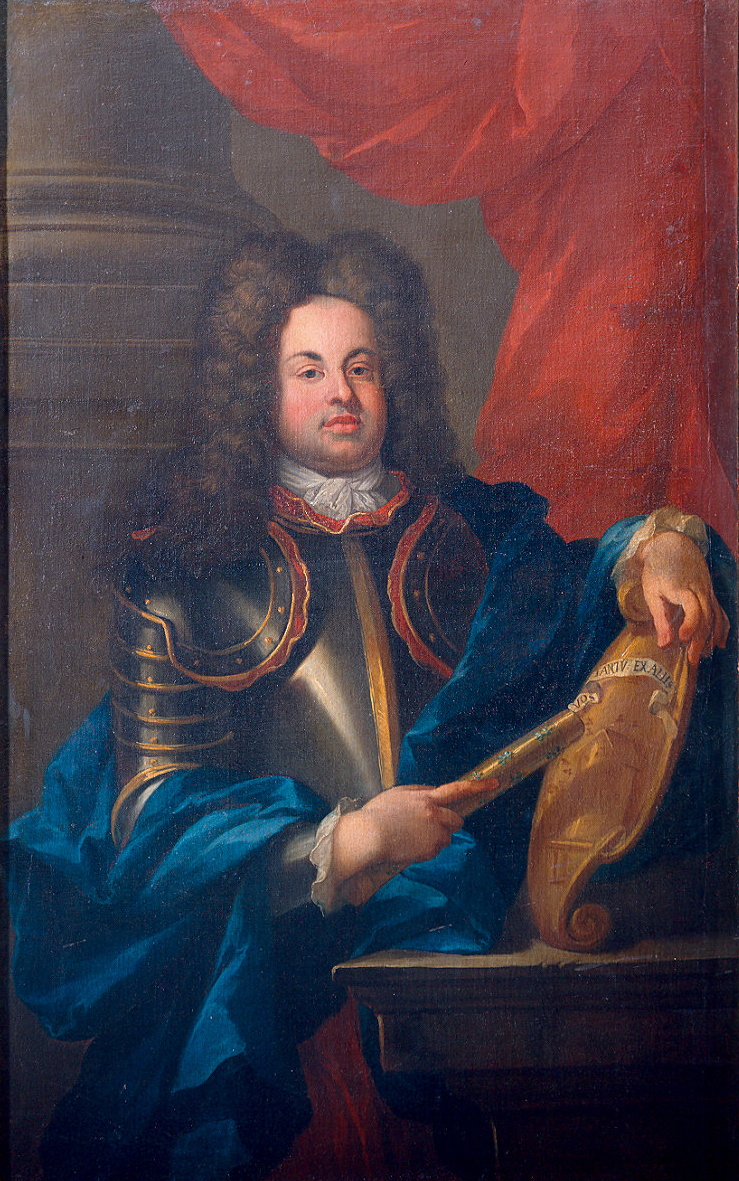
Antonio Farnese

- January 24 – Christian Wolff, German philosopher (d. 1754)
- March 18 – Matthew Decker, English merchant and writer (d. 1749)
- March 29 – Benedict Calvert, 4th Baron Baltimore, colonial governor of Maryland (d. 1715)
- May 29 – Antonio Farnese, Duke of Parma (d. 1731)
- August 16 – Catharine Trotter Cockburn, English novelist, dramatist, philosopher (d. 1749)
- August 22 – Pierre Guérin de Tencin, French cardinal (d. 1758)
- October 13 – Princess Magdalena Augusta of Anhalt-Zerbst, Duchess of Saxe-Gotha-Altenburg (d. 1740)
- October 16 – Jan Dismas Zelenka, Bohemian composer (d. 1745)
- October 18 – Ann Putnam, Jr., American accuser in the Salem witch trials (d. 1716)
- November 11 – Firmin Abauzit, French scientist (d. 1767)
- date unknown
  - James Erskine, Lord Grange, Scottish judge (d. 1754)
  - George Psalmanazar, French-born imposter and essayist (d. 1763)
  - Francesco Zerafa, Maltese architect (d. 1758)

== Deaths ==
1670

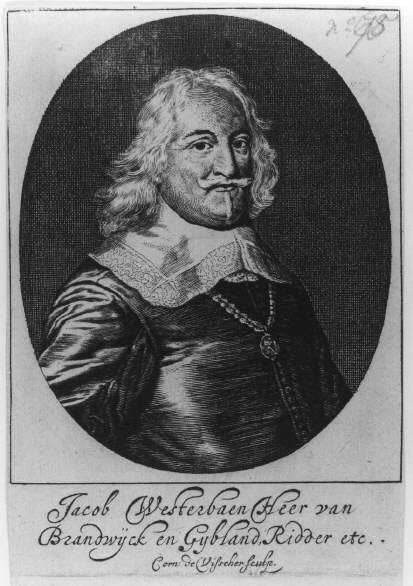
Jacob Westerbaen

- January 3 – George Monck, 1st Duke of Albemarle, English soldier (b. 1608)
- January 6
  - Sir Gilbert Gerard, 1st Baronet of Harrow on the Hill, English politician (b. 1587)
  - Charles of Sezze, Italian Franciscan friar and saint (b. 1613)
- January 21
  - Claude Duval, French-born highwayman (b. 1643)
  - Honorat de Bueil, seigneur de Racan, French aristocrat (b. 1589)
- January 25 – Nicholas Francis, Duke of Lorraine (b. 1609)
- February 9 – King Frederick III of Denmark (b. 1609)
- February 12 – Niklaus Dachselhofer, Swiss politician (b. 1595)
- February 17 – Elizabeth Barnard, granddaughter of William Shakespeare (b. 1608)
- March 1 – Giovanna Maria Bonomo, beatified Italian Catholic nun (b. 1606)
- March 2 – François-Henri Salomon de Virelade, French lawyer (b. 1620)
- March 10
  - Johann Glauber, German chemist (b. 1604)
  - Ludovicus a S. Carolo, French monk (b. 1608)
- March 15 – John Davenport, Connecticut pioneer (b. 1597)
- April – Ahom King Swargadeo Chakradhwaj Singha or Supangmung of Assam, India
- April 5 – Leonora Baroni, Italian singer (b. 1611)
- April 12 – George, Duke of Brunswick-Lüneburg (b. 1582)
- April 23 – Loreto Vittori, Italian singer and composer (b. 1600)
- May 10 – Claude Vignon, French painter (b. 1593)
- May 21
  - Niccolò Zucchi, Italian astronomer and physicist (b. 1586)
  - Giovanni Andrea Sirani, Italian painter (b. 1610)
- May 19 – Ferdinando Ughelli, Italian Cistercian monk, church historian (b. 1595)
- May 23 – Ferdinando II de' Medici, Grand Duke of Tuscany (b. 1610)
- May 31 – Josceline Percy, 11th Earl of Northumberland, English noble (b. 1644)
- June 12 – Hasanuddin of Gowa, 16th Ruler of the Sultanate of Gowa (b. 1631)
- June 25 – Lorens von der Linde, Swedish field marshal (b. 1610)
- June 27 – Thomas Bennet, English civil lawyer (b. 1592)
- June 28 – Hendrik Martenszoon Sorgh, Dutch painter (b. 1610)
- June 30
  - Henrietta, Duchess of Orléans, English and French princess (b. 1644)
  - Frederick, Prince of Anhalt-Harzgerode (b. 1613)
- July 16 – Abraham Diepraam, Dutch painter (b. 1622)
- August 24 – William Neile, English mathematician and founder member of the Royal Society (b. 1637)
- September 11 – Jeanne Chezard de Matel, French mystic (b. 1596)
- September 16 – William Penn, English admiral and politician (b. 1621)
- September 26 – Abraham Teniers, Flemish painter (b. 1629)
- September 28 – Alexander Morus, Franco-Scottish Calvinist preacher (b. 1616)
- August 10 – Richard Ottley, English politician (b. 1626)
- October 3 – Sir Henry Yelverton, 2nd Baronet, English Member of Parliament (b. 1633)
- October 27 – Vavasor Powell, Welsh non-conformist leader (b. 1617)
- November 8 – Emmanuel, Prince of Anhalt-Köthen, German prince of the House of Ascania (b. 1631)
- November 15 – Comenius, Czech writer (b. 1592)
- November 21 – William VII, Landgrave of Hesse-Kassel (b. 1651)
- November 22 – Landgravine Sophie of Hesse-Kassel, Countess of Schaumburg-Lippe (b. 1615)
- December 4 – Emilie of Oldenburg-Delmenhorst, Regent of Schwarzburg-Rudolstadt (1646–1662) (b. 1614)
- date unknown – Alena Arzamasskaia, Russian rebel leader (b. year unknown)

1671

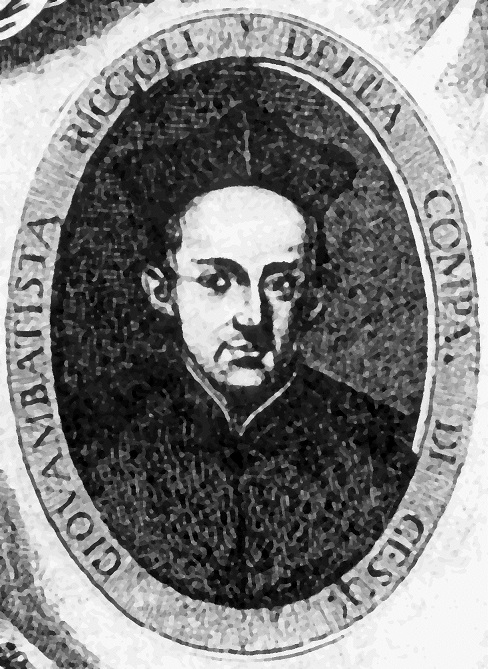
Giovanni Battista Riccioli

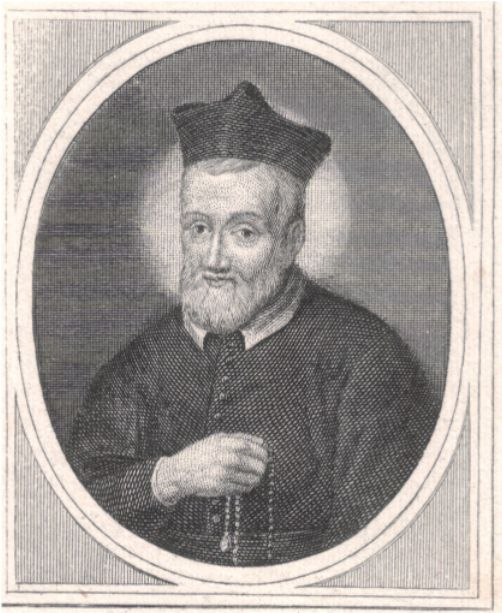
Blessed Antonio Grassi

- January 6 – Dubhaltach Mac Fhirbhisigh (b. 1643)
- January 24 – Philipp, Prince of Hohenzollern-Hechingen (b. 1616)
- January 25 – Henry X, Count of Reuss-Lobenstein, Rector of the University of Leipzig (b. 1621)
- February 18 – John Mennes, English Royal Navy admiral (b. 1599)
- February 22 – Adam Olearius, German scholar (b. 1599)
- February 19 – Tokugawa Yorinobu, Japanese nobleman (b. 1602)
- March 1
  - Marzio Ginetti, Italian Catholic cardinal (b. 1585)
  - Leopold Wilhelm of Baden-Baden, Imperial Field Marshal (b. 1626)
- March 7 – Antonio de la Cerda, 7th Duke of Medinaceli, Grandee of Spain (b. 1607)
- March 15 – Axel Urup, Danish general (b. 1601)
- March 31 – Anne Hyde, wife of the future James II of England (b. 1637)
- April 20 – Daniel Hay du Chastelet de Chambon, French mathematician (b. 1596)
- April 23 – Theodorick Bland of Westover, American politician (b. 1629)
- April 30
  - Petar Zrinski, Croatian Ban (title) and nobleman (b. 1621)
  - Fran Krsto Frankopan, Croatian poet and nobleman (b. 1643)
- May 5 – Edward Montagu, 2nd Earl of Manchester, English politician (b. 1602)
- May 8 – Sébastien Bourdon, French painter and engraver (b. 1616)
- May 12 – Pedro de Villagómez Vivanco, Roman Catholic prelate, Archbishop of Lima, then Bishop of Arequipa (b. 1589)
- May 16 – Sir John Langham, 1st Baronet, English Member of Parliament (b. 1584)
- May 19 – John Scudamore, 1st Viscount Scudamore, English politician and Viscount (b. 1601)
- June 2
  - Edward Leigh, English writer (b. 1602)
  - Sophia Eleonore of Saxony, German duchess (b. 1609)
- June 9 – Sebastian von Rostock, German bishop (b. 1607)
- June 25 – Giovanni Battista Riccioli, Italian astronomer (b. 1598)
- July 4 – Jan Cossiers, Flemish painter (b. 1600)
- July 14 – Méric Casaubon, English classical scholar (b. 1599)
- July 30 – Louis Joseph, Duke of Guise (b. 1650)
- August 3 – Antonio Barberini, Italian Catholic cardinal (b. 1607)
- August 10 – Sir John Evelyn, 1st Baronet, of Godstone, English noble (b. 1633)
- September 1 – Hugues de Lionne, French statesman (b. 1611)
- September 11 – Roshanara Begum, Mughal princess (b. 1617)
- September 19 – Gilbert Ironside the elder, English bishop (b. 1588)
- October 5 – Joachim Ernest, Duke of Schleswig-Holstein-Sonderburg-Plön (1622–1671) (b. 1595)
- October 26 – Sir John Gell, 1st Baronet, English politician (b. 1593)
- November 12 – Thomas Fairfax, 3rd Lord Fairfax of Cameron, English Civil War general (b. 1612)
- November 20 – Thomas Trenchard, English politician (b. 1640)
- December 13 – Antonio Grassi, Italian Roman Catholic priest and beatus (b. 1592)
- December 18 – Samuel Gott, English politician (b. 1614)
- December 28 – Johann Friedrich Gronovius, German classical scholar (b. 1611)

1672

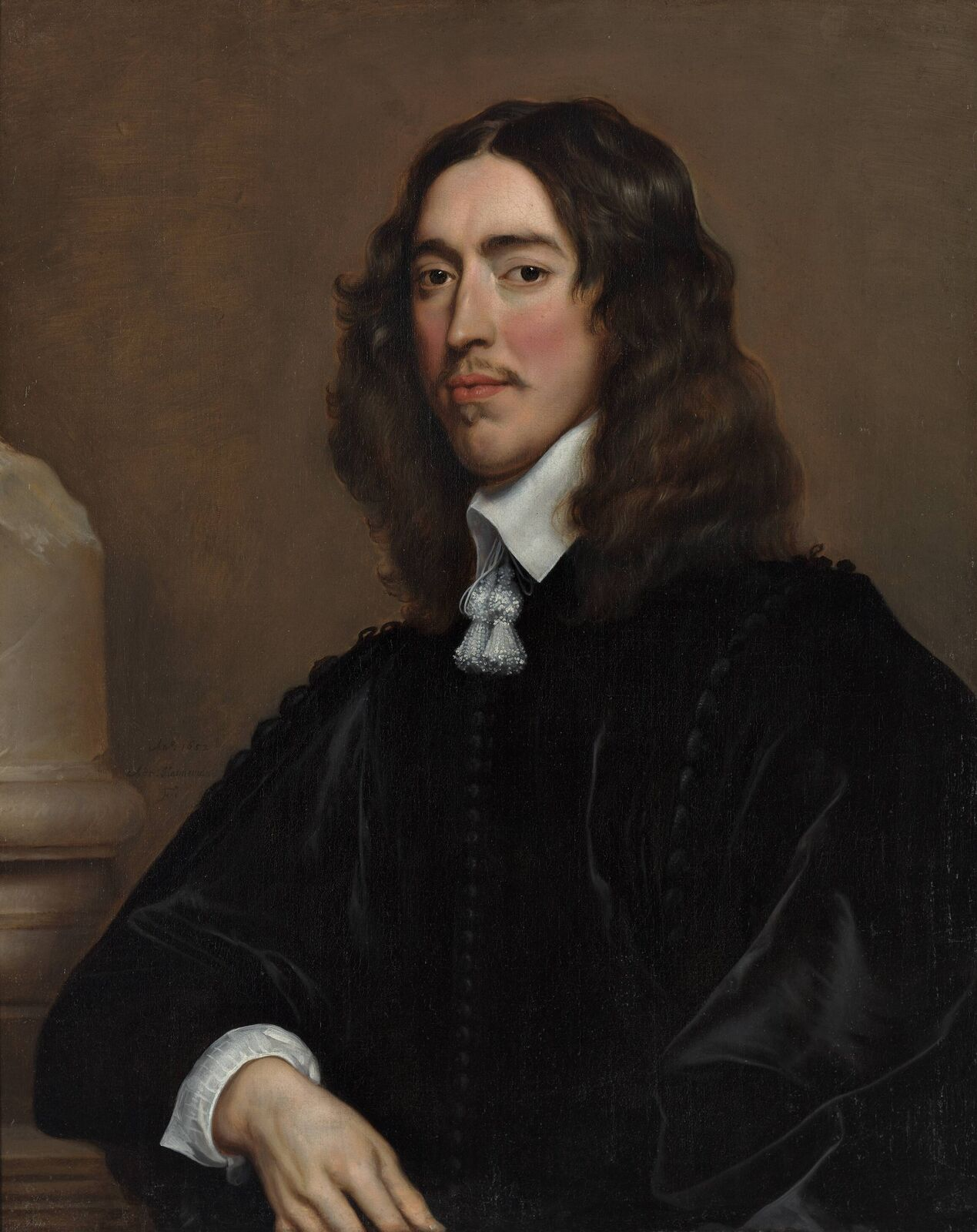
Johan de Witt

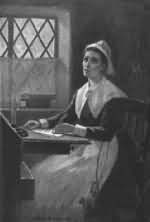
Anne Bradstreet

- January – Denis Gaultier, French lutenist and composer (b. 1603)
- January 15 – John Cosin, English clergyman (b. 1594)
- January 21 – Adriaen van de Velde, Dutch painter (b. 1636)
- January 28 – Pierre Séguier, Chancellor of France (b. 1588)
- February 17 – Madeleine Béjart, French actress and theatre director (b. 1618)
- February 19 – Charles Chauncy, English-born president of Harvard College (b. 1592)
- February 28
  - Christian, Duke of Brieg, Duke of Legnica (1663–1672) and Brieg (1664–1672) (b. 1618)
  - Sir Ralph Hare, 1st Baronet, English politician (b. 1623)
- March – Archibald Armstrong, court jester to James I of England and Charles I of England
- March 4 – Luis Guillermo de Moncada, 7th Duke of Montalto, Spanish Catholic cardinal (b. 1614)
- March 8 – Thomas Tyrrell, English judge and politician (b. 1594)
- March 18 – Agneta Horn, Swedish writer (b. 1629)
- April 2
  - Pedro Calungsod, Filipino saint (b. 1654)
  - Diego Luis de San Vitores, Spanish Jesuit missionary to Guam (b. 1627)
- April 4 – Henry Ernest, Count of Stolberg (b. 1593)
- April 13 – Marguerite of Lorraine, princess of Lorraine, duchess of Orléans (b. 1615)
- April 14
  - Friedrich Wilhelm III, Duke of Saxe-Altenburg (b. 1657)
  - King Pye Min of Burma (b. 1619)
- April 17 – Gryzelda Konstancja Zamoyska, Polish noble (b. 1623)
- April 21 – Antoine Godeau, French bishop and poet (b. 1605)
- April 22 – Georg Stiernhielm, Swedish poet (b. 1598)
- April 26 – Lionel Lockyer, English alchemist, quack doctor (b. 1600)
- April 30 – Marie of the Incarnation, French foundress of the Ursuline Monastery in Quebec (b. 1599)
- May 5 – Samuel Cooper, English painter (b. 1609)
- May 8 – Jean-Armand du Peyrer, Comte de Tréville and French Officer (b. 1598)
- May 11 – Charles Seton, 2nd Earl of Dunfermline, English royalist (b. 1615)
- May 28
  - Frescheville Holles, English Member of Parliament (b. 1642)
  - Edward Montagu, 1st Earl of Sandwich (b. 1625)
  - John Trevor, Welsh politician (b. 1626)
- June 7 – Willem Joseph van Ghent, Dutch admiral (b. 1626)
- June 14 – Matthew Wren, English politician (b. 1629)
- June 17 – Orazio Benevoli, Italian composer (b. 1605)
- June 27 – Roger Twysden, English antiquarian and royalist (b. 1597)
- July 3 – Francis Willughby, English biologist (b. 1635)
- July 21 – Captain John Underhill, English settler and soldier (b. 1597)
- August 2 – Amable de Bourzeys, French writer and academic (b. 1606)
- August 8 – Sir John Borlase, 1st Baronet, English politician (b. 1619)
- August 20
  - Johan de Witt, Dutch politician (b. 1625)
  - Cornelis de Witt, Dutch politician (b. 1623)
- September 9 – François-Joseph Bressani, Italian missionary (b. 1612)
- September 12 – Tanneguy Lefebvre, French classical scholar (b. 1615)
- September 14 – Henri Charles de La Trémoille, son of Henry de La Trémoille (b. 1620)
- September 16 – Anne Bradstreet, American colonial writer (b. c. 1612)
- October 8 – Johan Nieuhof, Dutch traveler who wrote about his journeys to Brazil (b. 1618)
- October 24 – John Webb, English architect (b. 1611)
- November 4 – Lucas van Uden, Dutch painter (b. 1595)
- November 6 – Heinrich Schütz, German composer (b. 1585)
- November 16 – Esaias Boursse, Dutch painter (b. 1631)
- November 19
  - Franciscus Sylvius, Dutch physician and scientist (b. 1614)
  - John Wilkins, English Bishop of Chester (b. 1614)
- December 6
  - King John II Casimir of Poland (b. 1609)
  - Pedro Antonio Fernández de Castro, 10th Count of Lemos, Viceroy of Peru (b. 1632)
- December 7 – Richard Bellingham, Massachusetts colonial magistrate (b. 1592)
- December 8 – Johann Christian von Boyneburg, German politician (b. 1622)
- December 19 – Dorothea Diana of Salm, German noblewoman (b. 1604)
- December 21 – Charles Stanley, 8th Earl of Derby, English noble (b. 1628)
- December 27 – Jacques Rohault, French philosopher (b. 1618)
- December 30 – Hendrick Bloemaert, Dutch painter (b. 1601)

1673

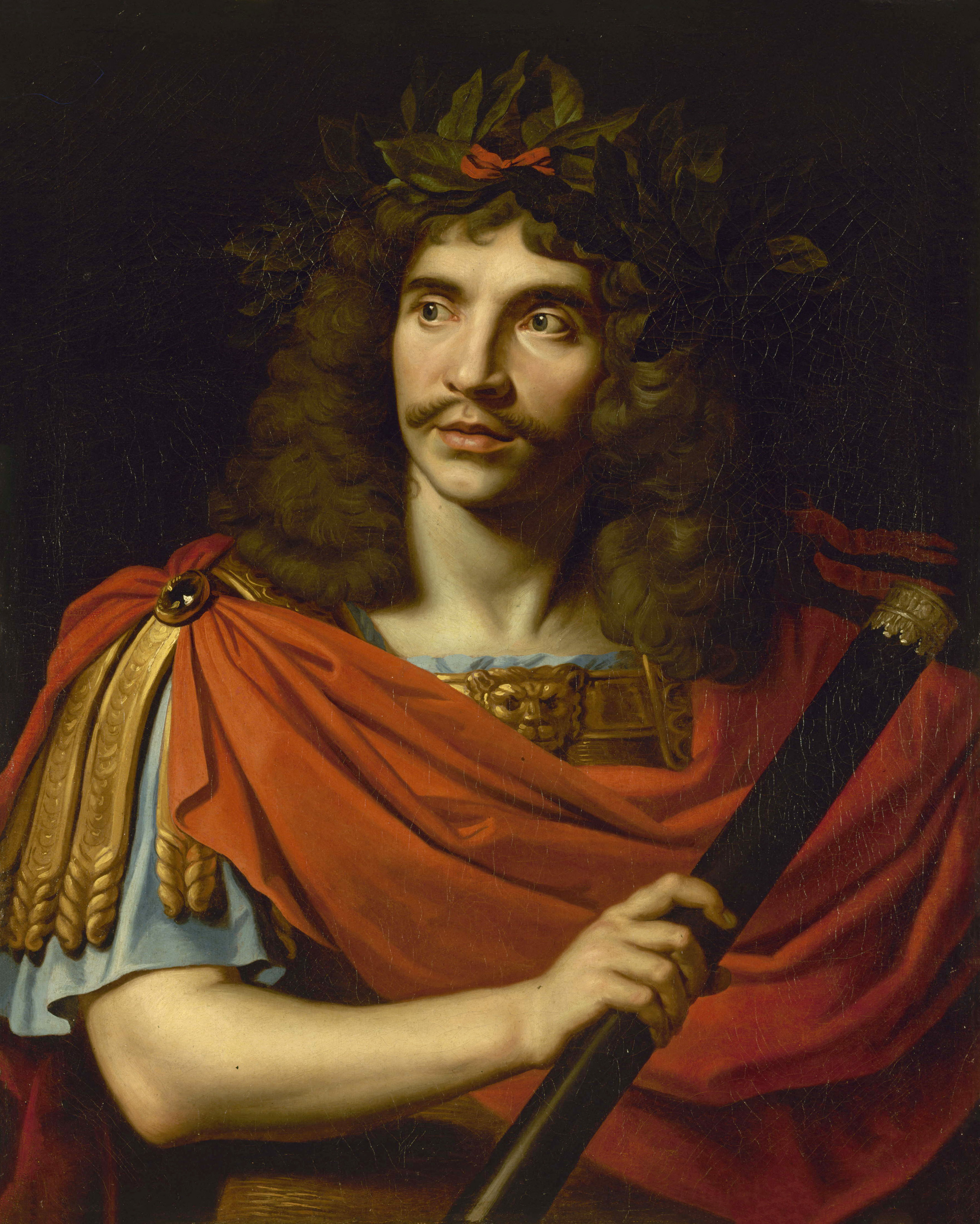
Molière

Margaret Cavendish

- January 11 – Bartholomew Mastrius, Italian theologian (b. 1602)
- January 22 – Mary Carleton, Englishwoman who used false identities (b. 1642)
- January 26 – Jérôme Lalemant, French Jesuit priest and missionary to Canada (b. 1593)
- February 2 – Kaspar Förster, German singer and composer (b. 1616)
- February 12, – Johann Philipp von Schönborn, Archbishop-Elector of Mainz (1647– (b. 1605)
- February 17 – Molière, French writer and actor (b. 1622)
- February 22 – Anna Magdalene of Hanau, German countess (b. 1600)
- March 6 – Isaack Luttichuys, Dutch Golden Age painter (b. 1616)
- March 12 – Margaret Theresa of Spain (b. 1651)
- March 15 – Salvator Rosa, Italian painter and poet (b. 1615)
- March 20
  - Anna Margareta von Haugwitz, Swedish countess (b. 1622)
  - Augustyn Kordecki, Polish prior (b. 1603)
- April 21 – Ignace-Gaston Pardies, French physicist (b. 1636)
- May 14 – Sir Gerrard Napier, 1st Baronet, English politician (b. 1606)
- May 6 – Werner Rolfinck, German physician, chemist, botanist, philosopher (b. 1599)
- May 9 – Jacques Vallée, Sieur Des Barreaux, French poet (b. 1599)
- May 27 – Henry Hungerford, English politician (b. 1611)
- May 30 – Sir Edward Bagot, 2nd Baronet, English politician (b. 1616)
- June 6 – Eugene Maurice, Count of Soissons, Italian noble (b. 1635)
- June 18 – Jeanne Mance, French Canadian settler (b. 1606)
- June 28 – Johan Schatter, Dutch member of the Haarlem schutterij (b. 1594)
- June 25 – Charles de Batz-Castelmore d'Artagnan, French soldier (b. 1611)
- July 4 – Robert Moray, English Freemason (b. 1608 or 1609)
- July 15 – Helena Fourment, Dutch model, second wife of Peter Paul Rubens (b. 1614)
- August 17 – Regnier de Graaf, Dutch physician and anatomist (b. 1641)
- August 21
  - Henry Grey, 1st Earl of Stamford, English soldier (b. c. 1599)
  - Daniel Pawłowski, Polish writer (b. 1627)
  - Isaac Sweers, Dutch admiral (b. 1622)
- August 25 – Bartram de Fouchier, Dutch painter (b. 1609)
- September 6 – Jan Thomas van Ieperen, Flemish engraver and painter (b. 1617)
- September 21 – Lorenzo Imperiali, Italian cardinal (b. 1612)
- October 5 – Francesco Grue, Italian artist (b. 1618)
- October 13 – Christoffer Gabel, Danish statesman (b. 1617)
- October 17 – Thomas Clifford, 1st Baron Clifford of Chudleigh, English statesman (b. 1630)
- November 6 – Robert Harley, English politician (b. 1626)
- November 10 – Michał Korybut Wiśniowiecki, King of Poland (b. 1640)
- November 17 – Thomas Wendy, English politician (b. 1614)
- November 29 – Armand de Gramont, Comte de Guiche, French nobleman (b. 1637)
- December 15 – Margaret Cavendish, English writer (b. 1623)
- December 21 – Joan Blaeu, Dutch cartographer (b. 1596)
- December 29 – Manuel da Câmara III, Portuguese noble (b. 1630)
- December 31 – Oliver St John, English statesman and judge (b. c. 1598)

1674

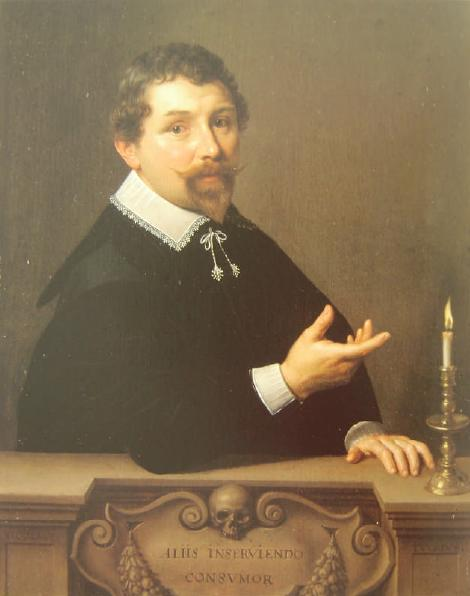
Nicolaes Tulp

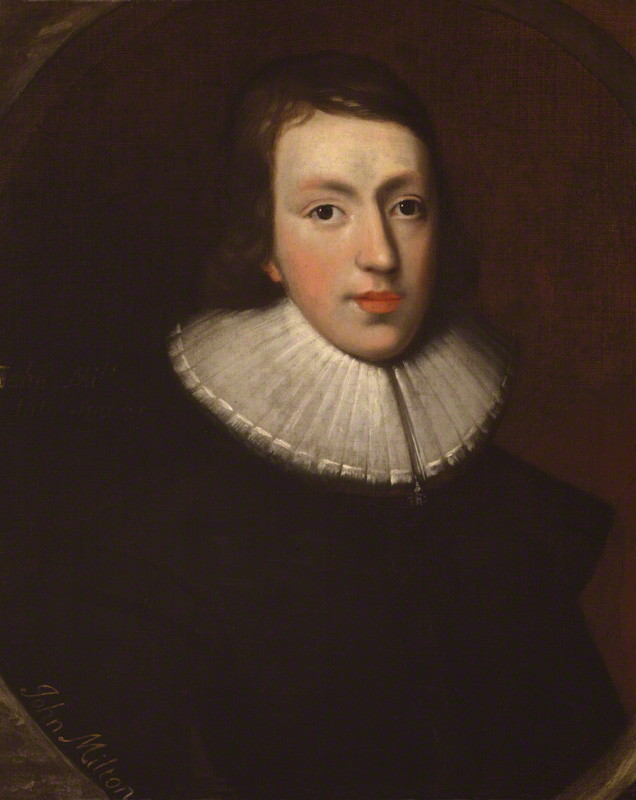
John Milton

- January 3 – Claude Maltret, French Jesuit (b. 1621)
- January 5 – Ebba Brahe, Swedish countess, landowner, and courtier (b. 1596)
- January 10 – Jacob de Witt, Mayor of Dordrecht (b. 1589)
- January 12 – Giacomo Carissimi Italian composer (b. 1605)
- January 21
  - Cornelis Bisschop, Dutch painter (b. 1630)
  - Henri de La Trémoille, French general and noble (b. 1598)
- February 13 – Jean de Labadie, 17th-century French pietist (b. 1610)
- February 14 – Carlo de Tocco, Italian nobleman (b. 1592)
- February 22
  - Jean Chapelain, French writer (b. 1595)
  - John Wilson, English composer (b. 1595)
- February 24 – Matthias Weckmann, German composer (b. 1616)
- February 26 – Jean Pecquet, French anatomist (b. 1622)
- March 2 – Salomon Sweers, Dutch businessman (b. 1611)
- March 8 – Charles Sorel, sieur de Souvigny, French writer (b. 1597)
- March 15 – Edward Digges, English barrister and colonist, Colonial Governor of Virginia (b. 1620)
- March 19 – Queen Inseon, Korean royal consort (b. 1619)
- March 23 – Henry Cromwell, 4th son of Oliver Cromwell and Elizabeth Bourchier (b. 1628)
- March 29 – Ove Bjelke, Norwegian civil servant (b. 1611)
- April 18 – John Graunt, English demographer (b. 1620)
- April 24 – Frances Seymour, Duchess of Somerset (b. 1599)
- June 1 – Beata Rosenhane, Swedish writer (b. 1638)
- June 4 – Jan Lievens, Dutch painter (b. 1607)
- June 8 – Henry Hildyard, English Member of Parliament (b. 1610)
- June 14 – Marin le Roy de Gomberville, French writer (b. 1600)
- June 16 – Empress Xiaochengren, Chinese Qing Dynasty empress (b. 1653)
- June 25
  - Sir Orlando Bridgeman, 1st Baronet, of Great Lever (b. 1606)
  - Mauritia Eleonora of Portugal, Princess of Portugal and countess consort of Nassau-Siegen (b. 1609)
- July 2 – Eberhard III, Duke of Württemberg (b. 1614)
- July 29 – Eva Krotoa, Khoi translator and interpreter (b. 1643)
- July 30
  - Hans Conrad Werdmüller, Swiss military commander (b. 1606)
  - Francisco Ignacio Alcina, Jesuit missionary and historian (b. 1610)
- August 8 – Maeda Toshitsugu, Japanese daimyō of the early Edo period (b. 1617)
- August 12 – Philippe de Champaigne, French painter (b. 1602)
- September 12 – Nicolaes Tulp, Dutch anatomist and politician (b. 1593)
- September 17 – Hyeonjong of Joseon, 18th monarch of the Korean Joseon Dynasty (b. 1641)
- September 22 – Herman Egon, Prince of Fürstenberg, High Chamberlain of the Elector of Bavaria (b. 1627)
- September 27 – Robert Arnauld d'Andilly, French writer (b. 1589)
- September 29 – Gerbrand van den Eeckhout, Dutch painter (b. 1621)
- October 2 – George Frederick of Nassau-Siegen, officer in the Dutch Army (b. 1606)
- October 12 – Jeremias van Rensselaer, Dutch colonial governor (b. 1632)
- October 15 – Robert Herrick, English poet (b. 1591)
- October 27 – Hallgrímur Pétursson, Icelandic poet (b. 1614)
- November 8 – John Milton, English Puritan poet (b. 1608)
- November 16 – Isbrand van Diemerbroeck, Dutch physician (b. 1609)
- November 18 – Charles Lallemant, French Jesuit (b. 1587)
- December 9 – Edward Hyde, 1st Earl of Clarendon, English statesman and historian (b. 1609)
- December 10 – John Vaughan, English judge (b. 1603)
- December 28 – John Oxenbridge, English Nonconformist divine (b. 1608)
- Date unknown
  - Hu Zhengyan, Chinese artist, printmaker, calligrapher and publisher (b. c. 1584)
  - Thomas Traherne, English poet (b. c. 1637)

1675

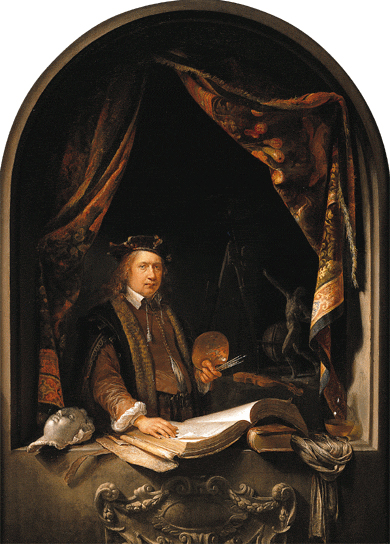
Gerrit Dou

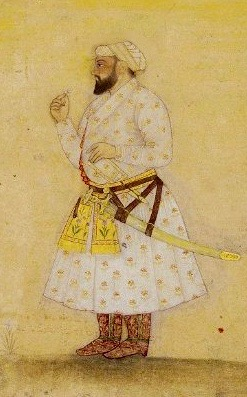
Guru Tegh Bahadur

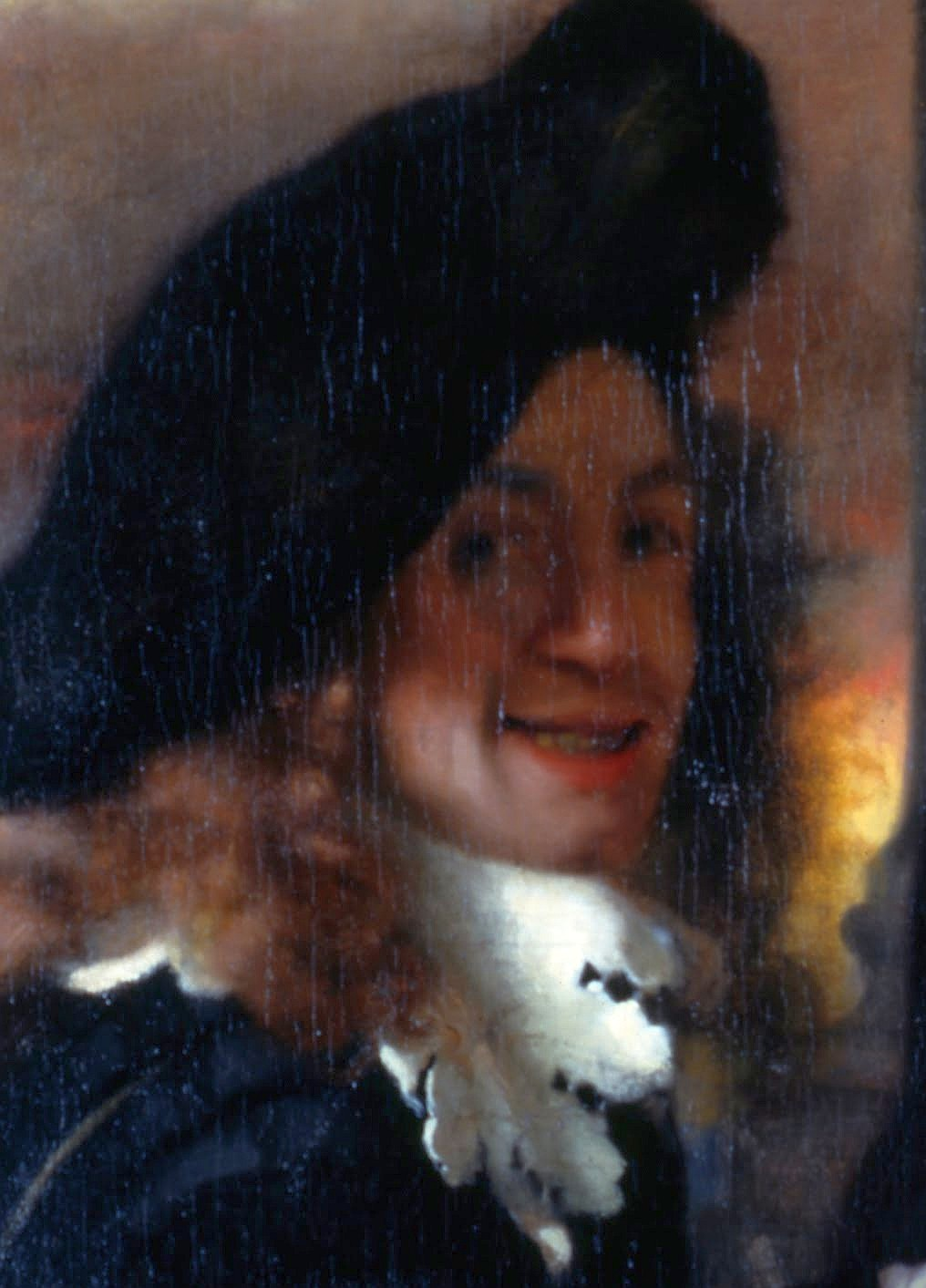
Johannes Vermeer

- January 9 – Francesco Maria Brancaccio, Catholic cardinal (b. 1592)
- January 26 – Domenico II Contarini, Doge of Venice (b. 1585)
- February 8 – Anna Moroni, Italian educator (b. 1613)
- February 9 – Gerhard Douw, Dutch painter (b. 1613)
- February 10 – Gervase Holles, English Member of Parliament (b. 1607)
- March 14 – Francis Davies, British bishop (b. 1605)
- March 18 – Arthur Chichester, 1st Earl of Donegall, Irish soldier (b. 1606)
- April 8 – Veit Erbermann, German theologian (b. 1597)
- April 10 – Dorothea of Saxe-Altenburg, Duchess of Saxe-Altenburg by births and by marriage Duchess of Saxe-Eisenach (b. 1601)
- April 12 – Richard Bennett, British Colonial Governor of Virginia (b. 1609)
- May 1 – Jonathan Rashleigh, English politician (b. 1591)
- May 6 – August Philipp, Duke of Schleswig-Holstein-Sonderburg-Beck, Danish-German prince and member of the House of Oldenburg (b. 1612)
- May 18
  - Stanisław Lubieniecki, Polish Socinian theologian (b. 1623)
  - Father Jacques Marquette, French missionary and explorer (b. 1636)
- May 27 – Gaspard Dughet, French painter (b. 1613)
- June 5 – John Mordaunt, 1st Viscount Mordaunt, English politician (b. 1626)
- June 11
  - Sir Anthony Cope, 4th Baronet, English Member of Parliament (b. 1632)
  - Dorothea Maria of Saxe-Weimar, Duchess of Saxe-Zeitz, by marriage Duchess of Saxe-Zeitz (b. 1641)
- June 12 – Charles Emmanuel II, Duke of Savoy (b. 1634)
- July 14 – Daniel Hallé, French painter (b. 1614)
- July 20 – Giles Strangways, English politician (b. 1615)
- July 25 – Johan Stiernhöök, Swedish lawyer (b. 1596)
- July 27 – Henri de la Tour d'Auvergne, Vicomte de Turenne, Marshal of France (b. 1611)
- July 28 – Bulstrode Whitelocke, English lawyer (b. 1605)
- August 5 – Brynjólfur Sveinsson, Icelandic bishop and scholar (b. 1605)
- August 16 – António Luís de Meneses, 1st Marquis of Marialva, Portuguese general and noble (b. 1596)
- August 29 – Joachim Irgens von Westervick, Dano–Norwegian nobleman (b. 1611)
- September 8
  - Amalia of Solms-Braunfels, Princess consort to Frederick Henry (b. 1602)
  - Frederick, Count of Nassau-Weilburg, ruling Count of Nassau-Weilburg (b. 1640)
- September 18 – Charles IV, Duke of Lorraine (b. 1604)
- September 23 – Valentin Conrart, French founder of the Académie française (b. 1603)
- October 10 – Tommaso Tamburini, Italian theologian (b. 1591)
- October 15 – William Wadsworth, American colonial pioneer (b. 1594)
- October 26 – William Sprague, English co-founder of Charlestown, Massachusetts (b. 1609)
- October 27 – Gilles de Roberval, French mathematician (b. 1602)
- November – Feodosia Morozova, Russian religious dissident martyr (b. 1632)
- November 1 – Guru Tegh Bahadur, 9th Sikh Guru (b. 1621)
- November 4 – Remigius van Leemput, painter from the Southern Netherlands (b. 1607)
- November 10 – Leopoldo de' Medici, Italian Catholic cardinal (b. 1617)
- November 11 – Thomas Willis, English doctor who played an important part in the history of anatomy (b. 1621)
- November 15 – Preben von Ahnen, German-born civil servant and landowner in Norway (b. 1606)
- November 21 – George William, Duke of Liegnitz (b. 1660)
- November 28 – Basil Feilding, 2nd Earl of Denbigh, English Civil War soldier (b. c. 1608)
- November 28 – Leonard Hoar, American President of Harvard University (b. 1630)
- November 30
  - Cecil Calvert, 2nd Baron Baltimore, colonial Governor of Maryland (b. 1605)
  - Sir John Lowther, 1st Baronet, of Lowther, English politician (b. 1605)
- December 6 – John Lightfoot, English churchman, scholar (b. 1602)
- December 15 (bur.) – Johannes Vermeer, Dutch painter (b. 1632)
- December 16 – Armand-Nompar de Caumont, duc de La Force, Marshal of France (b. 1580)
- December 23 – Caesar, duc de Choiseul, French marshal and diplomat (b. 1602)
- date unknown – Margareta Beijer, director of the Swedish Royal Post Office (b. 1625)

1676

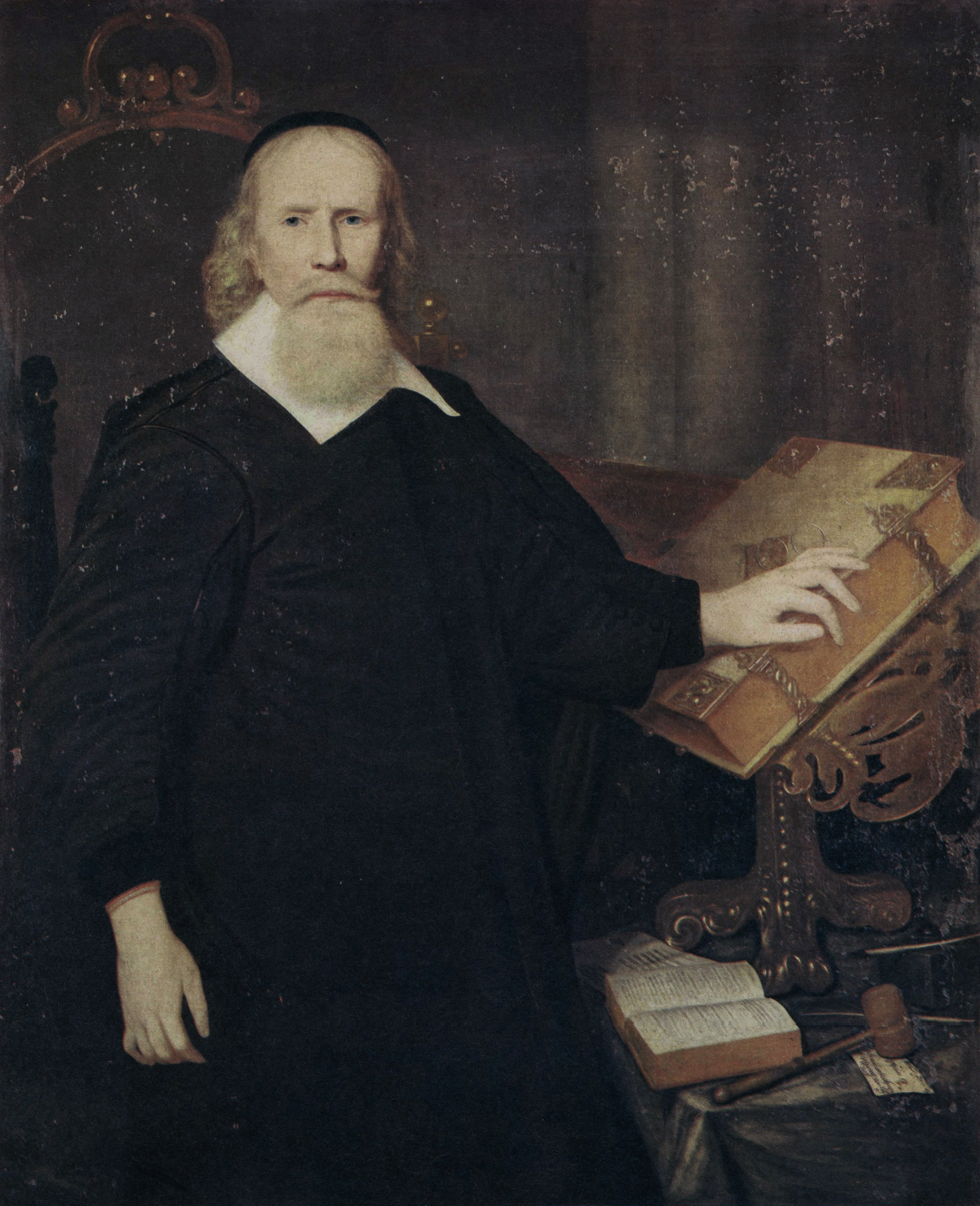
John Clarke

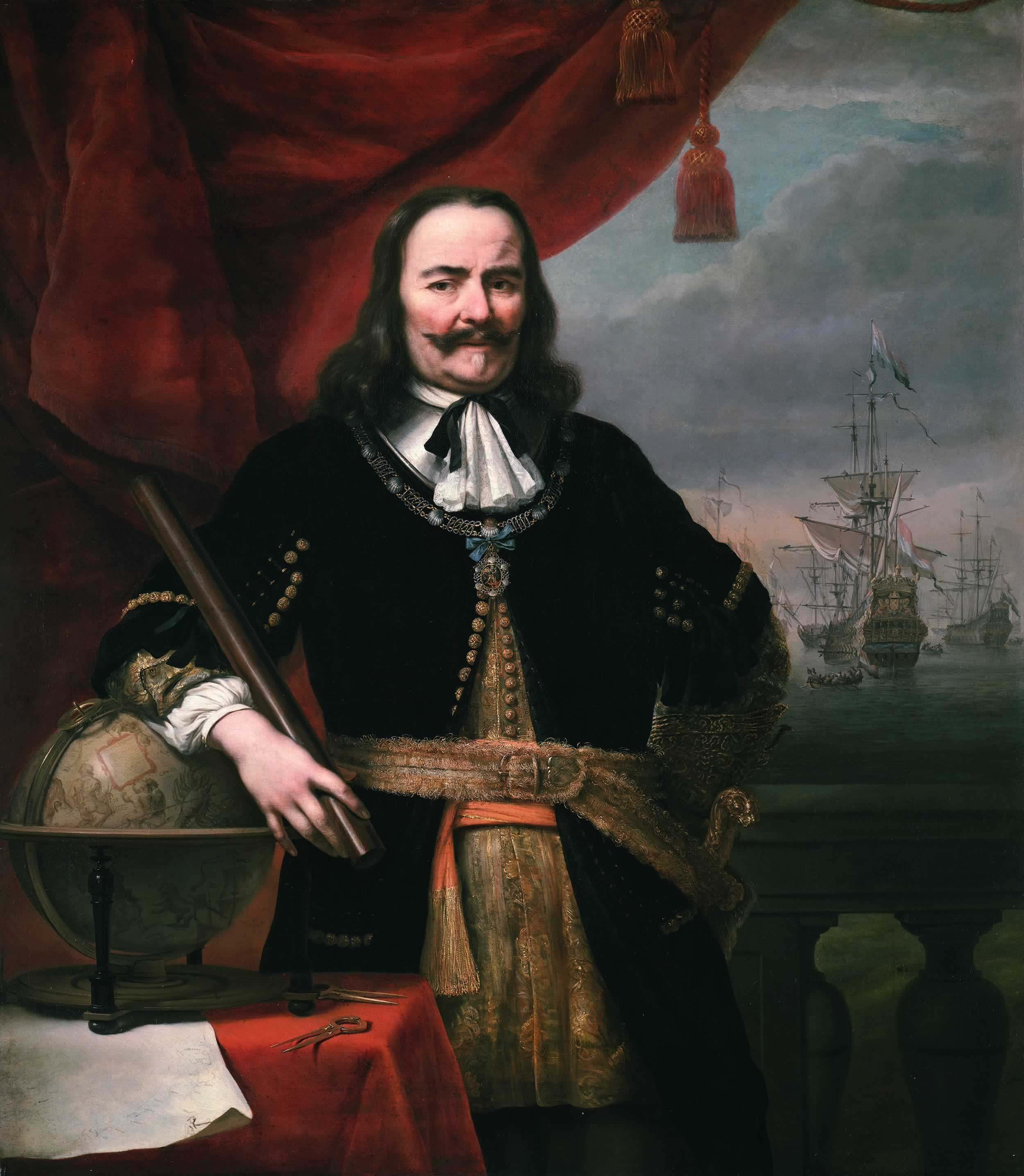
Michiel de Ruyter

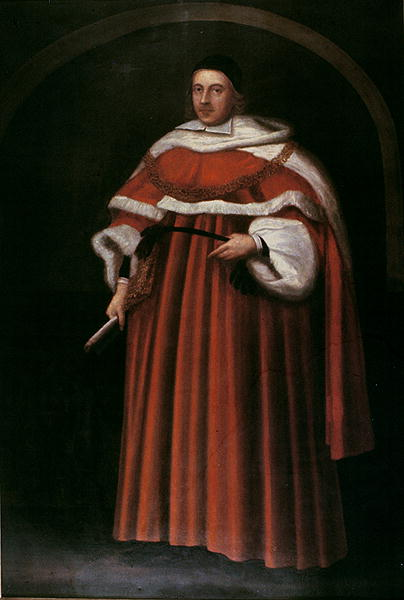
Matthew Hale

- January 7 – Marco Faustini, Italian opera manager (b. 1606)
- January 13 – Isaac Commelin, Dutch historian (b. 1598)
- January 14 – Francesco Cavalli, Italian composer (b. 1602)
- January 16 – Georg Arnold, Austrian musician (b. 1621)
- January 29 – Tsar Alexis of Russia (b. 1629)
- February 3 – François Chauveau, French painter (b. 1613)
- February 14 – Abraham Bosse, French engraver and artist (b. c. 1604)
- February 20 – Hugh Forth, English politician (b. 1610)
- March 2 – Juan de Almoguera, Roman Catholic prelate who served as Archbishop of Lima (1673–1676) and Bishop of Arequipa (1659–1673) (b. 1605)
- March 21 – Henri Sauval, French historian (b. 1623)
- March 22 – Lady Anne Clifford, 14th Baroness de Clifford (b. 1590)
- March 23 – Paul Würtz, Swedish general (b. 1612)
- March 27 – Bernardino de Rebolledo, Spanish poet, soldier and diplomat (b. 1597)
- April 5 – John Winthrop the Younger, Governor of Connecticut (b. 1606)
- April 8 – Claudia Felicitas of Austria, Holy Roman Empress (b. 1653)
- April 20 – John Clarke, English physician (b. 1609)
- April 29 – Michiel de Ruyter, Dutch admiral (b. 1607)
- May 5 – Sir Richard Lloyd, English politician (b. 1606)
- May 7 – Henri Valois, French historian (b. 1603)
- May 25 – Johann Rahn, Swiss mathematician (b. 1622)
- May 26 – Thomas Rouse, English politician (b. 1608)
- June 1 – Karl Kaspar von der Leyen, German Catholic archbishop (b. 1618)
- June 7 – Paul Gerhardt, German hymnist (b. 1606)
- June 13 – Princess Henriette Adelaide of Savoy, wife of Ferdinand Maria (b. 1636)
- June 16 – Nathaniel Dickinson, American settler (b. 1601)
- June 29 – Hendrik van der Borcht II, German painter (b. 1614)
- July – Jesse Wharton colonial governor of Maryland
- July 5 – Carl Gustaf Wrangel, Swedish soldier (b. 1613)
- July 8 – Francis I Rákóczi, Hungarian prince of Transylvania (b. 1645)
- July 12 – Duchess Elisabeth Sophie of Mecklenburg, German poet composer and (by marriage) Duchess of Brunswick-Lüneburg (b. 1613)
- July 22 – Pope Clement X (b. 1590)
- July 25 – François Hédelin, abbé d'Aubignac, French writer (b. 1604)
- July 17 – Madame de Brinvilliers, French murderer (b. 1630)
- August 11 – Hans Jakob Christoffel von Grimmelshausen, German writer (b. 1621)
- August 14 – Nicolò Sagredo, 105th Doge of Venice (b. 1606)
- August 28 – Margravine Louise Charlotte of Brandenburg, Duchess of Courland by marriage (1645–1676) (b. 1617)
- August 31 – Lars Stigzelius, Swedish Lutheran archbishop (b. 1598)
- September 4 – John Ogilby, Scottish-born impresario and cartographer active in Dublin and London (b. 1600)
- September 9 – Paul de Chomedey, Sieur de Maisonneuve, French military officer, founder of Montreal in New France (b. 1612)
- September 10 – Gerrard Winstanley, English religious reformer (b. 1609)
- September 11 – Anna de' Medici, Archduchess of Austria (b. 1616)
- September 17 – Sabbatai Zevi, Montenegrin rabbi, kabbalist and founder of the Jewish Sabbatean movement (b. 1626)
- September 28 – Anna Maria Antigó, Spanish Catholic nun (b. 1602)
- October 6 – Claudia Rusca, Italian composer, singer, and organist (b. 1593)
- October 7 – Richard Neville, English soldier and MP (b. 1615)
- October 10 – Sebastian Knüpfer, German composer (b. 1633)
- October 13 – Juan de Arellano, Spanish artist (b. 1614)
- October 15 – Simon de Vos, Flemish painter (b. 1603)
- October 26 – Nathaniel Bacon, Virginian colonist and instigator of Bacon's Rebellion (b. circa 1640s)
- October 28 – Jean Desmarets, French writer (b. 1595)
- November 1 – Gisbertus Voetius, Dutch theologian (b. 1589)
- November 9 – Allart Pieter van Jongestall, Dutch jurist, politician, and diplomat (b. 1612)
- November 12 – Shang Kexi, Chinese general (b. 1604)
- December 11 – Roland Fréart de Chambray, French writer (b. 1606)
- December 12 – William Morice, English politician (b. 1602)
- December 18 – Edward Benlowes, English poet (b. 1603)
- December 19 – Adolph, Prince of Nassau-Schaumburg and Count of Nassau-Schaumburg (1653–1676) (b. 1629)
- December 25
  - Matthew Hale, Lord Chief Justice of England (b. 1609)
  - William Cavendish, 1st Duke of Newcastle-upon-Tyne, English soldier, politician, writer (b. 1592)

1677

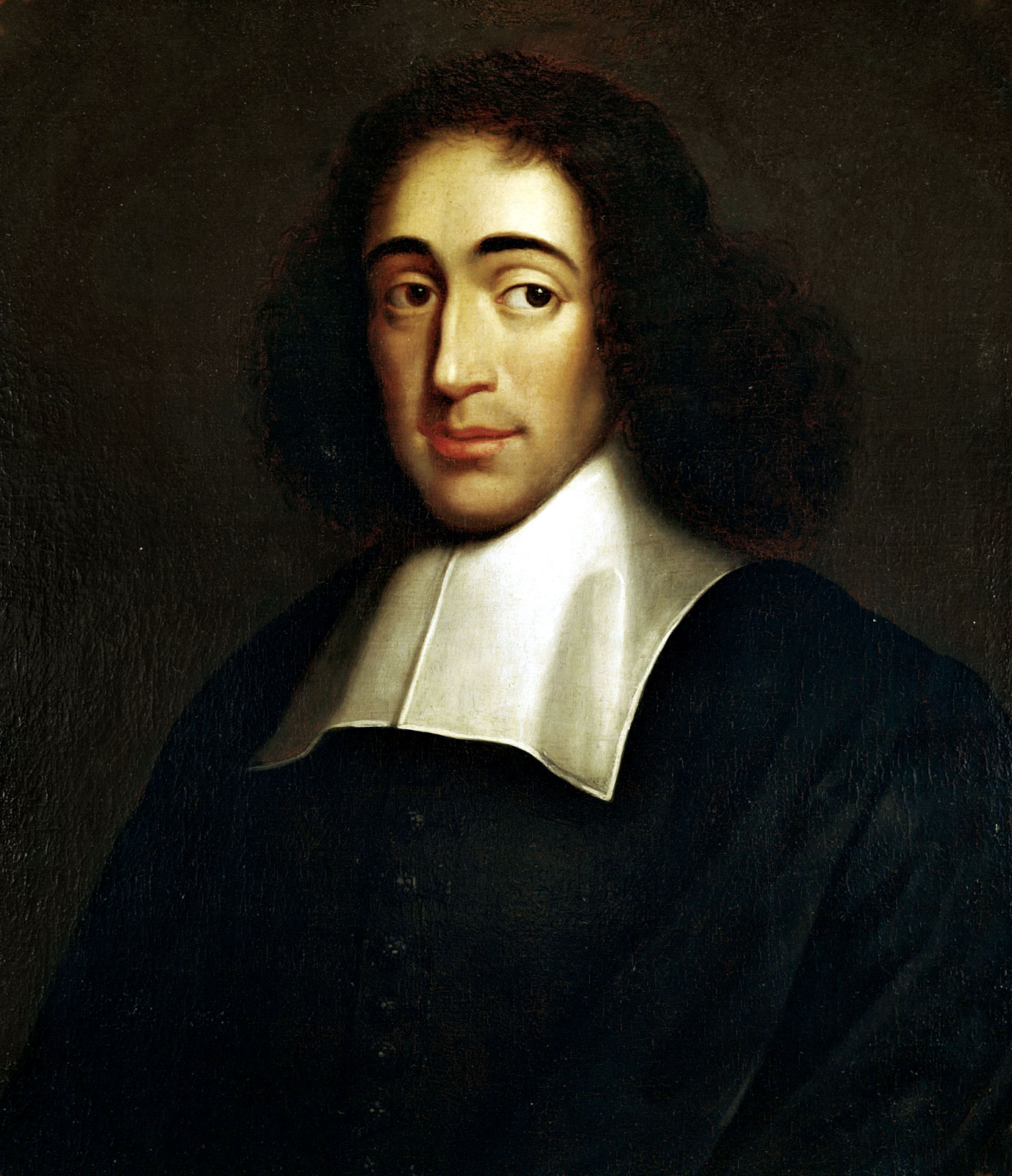
Baruch Spinoza

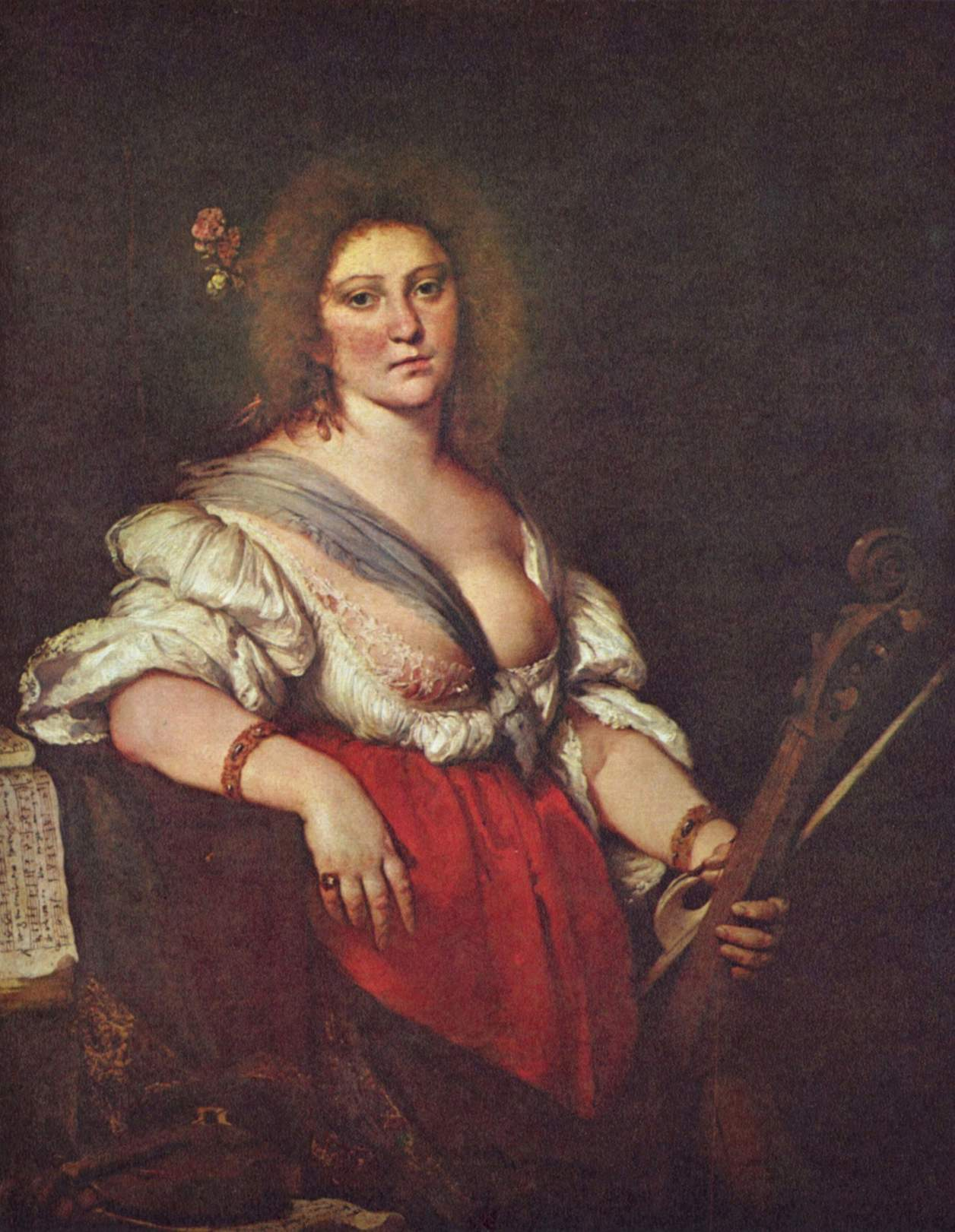
Barbara Strozzi

- January 8 – Sir John Fowell, 2nd Baronet, English politician (b. 1623)
- January 18 – Jan van Riebeeck, Dutch founder of Cape Town (b. 1619)
- January 31 – Frederick VI, Margrave of Baden-Durlach (b. 1617)
- February 9 – George Horner, English politician (b. 1605)
- February 21 – Baruch Spinoza, Dutch philosopher (b. 1632)
- March 18 – Marie Luise von Degenfeld, morganatic second wife of Charles I Louis, Elector Palatine of Germany (b. 1634)
- March 28 – Václav Hollar, Czech-born actor (b. 1607)
- April 22 – Václav Eusebius František, Prince of Lobkowicz, Austrian field marshal and prince (b. 1609)
- May 4 – Isaac Barrow, English mathematician (b. 1630)
- May 20 – George Digby, 2nd Earl of Bristol, English statesman (b. 1612)
- May 22 – William, Margrave of Baden-Baden (b. 1593)
- May 23 – John, Count of Nassau-Idstein (1629–1677) (b. 1603)
- May 24 – Anders Bording, Danish writer (b. 1619)
- June 11 – Jacques Esprit, French writer (b. 1611)
- June 23 – Wilhelm Ludwig, Duke of Württemberg (b. 1647)
- June 18 – Johann Franck, German poet and hymnist (b. 1618)
- June 26 – Francesco Buonamici, Italian architect, painter and engraver (b. 1596)
- July 11 – Timothy Turner, English judge, actor (b. 1585)
- July 27 – Johannes Loccenius, German historian (b. 1598)
- July 30 – Fabian von Fersen, Swedish soldier (b. 1626)
- August
  - Matthew Locke, English composer (b. 1621)
  - Joseph Pardo, English-Jewish hazzan (b. c. 1624)
- August 1 – George Christian, Landgrave of Hesse-Homburg (1669–1671) (b. 1626)
- August 20 – Pierre Petit, French astronomer, military engineer, and physicist (b. 1594)
- August 28 – Wallerant Vaillant, painter of the Dutch Golden Age (b. 1623)
- September 11 – James Harrington, English political philosopher (b. 1611)
- September 12
  - Tønne Huitfeldt, Norwegian landowner and military officer (b. 1625)
  - Camillo Massimo, Italian cardinal, patron of the arts (b. 1620)
- October 9 – Gustav Adolph, Count of Nassau-Saarbrücken and general sergeant of the Holy Roman Empire at the Rhine (b. 1632)
- October 14 – Józef Bartłomiej Zimorowic, Polish poet (b. 1597)
- November 2 – Robert Sidney, 2nd Earl of Leicester, English politician (b. 1595)
- November 9 – Aernout van der Neer, Dutch painter (b. 1603)
- November 11
  - Johann Weikhard of Auersperg, Austrian prime minister (b. 1615)
  - Barbara Strozzi, Italian singer and composer (b. 1619)
- November 14 – Matthias Abele, Austrian jurist, mine official (b. 1618)
- December 13 – Thomas Howard, 5th Duke of Norfolk, English noble (b. 1627)
- December 14 – Christian Albert, Burgrave and Count of Dohna, German nobleman and general in the army of Brandenburg (b. 1621)
- December 26 – Bernhard Gustav of Baden-Durlach, Swedish general, Prince-Abbot and cardinal (b. 1631)
- date unknown – Gilbert Sheldon, Archbishop of Canterbury (b. 1598)

1678

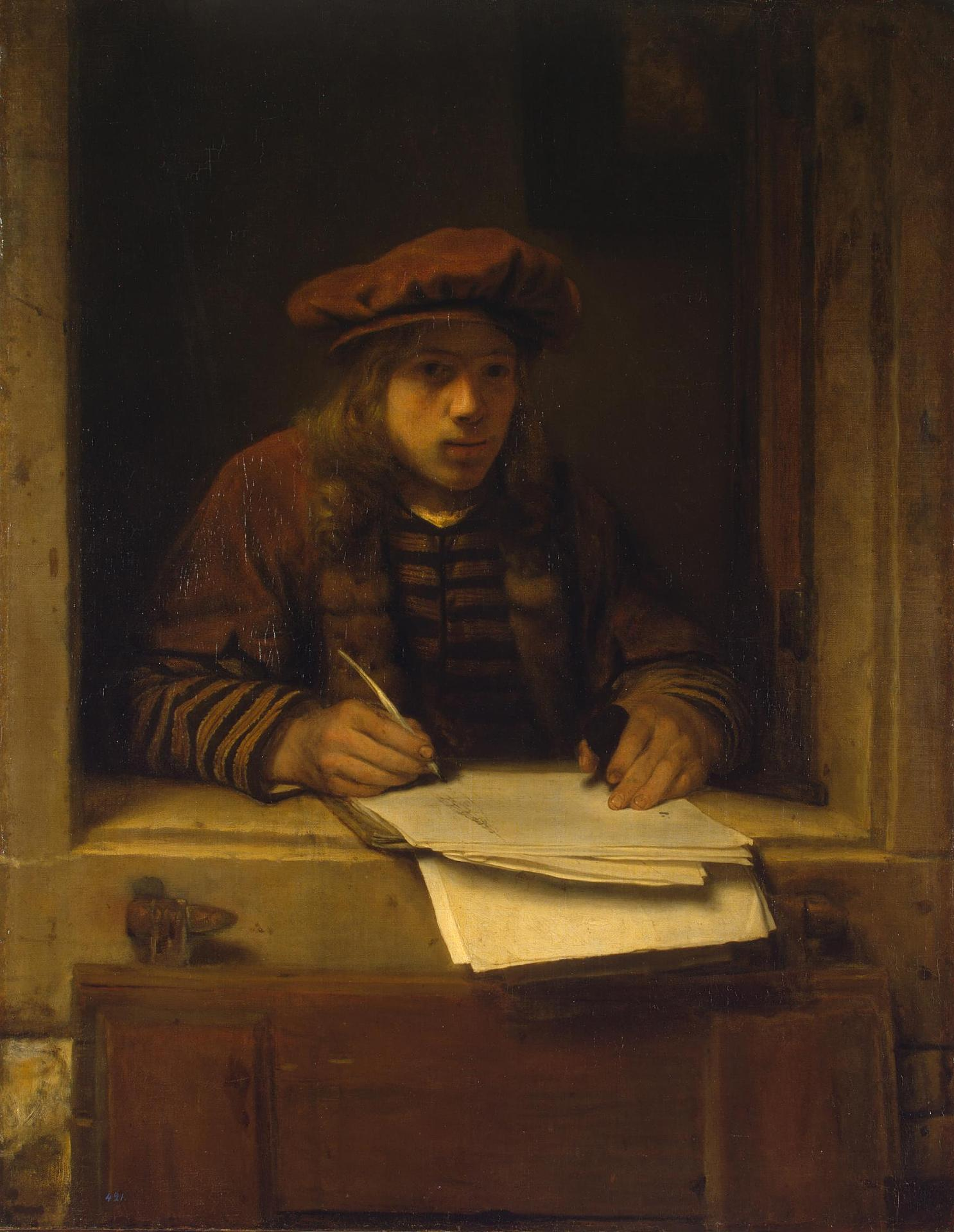
Samuel Dirksz van Hoogstraten

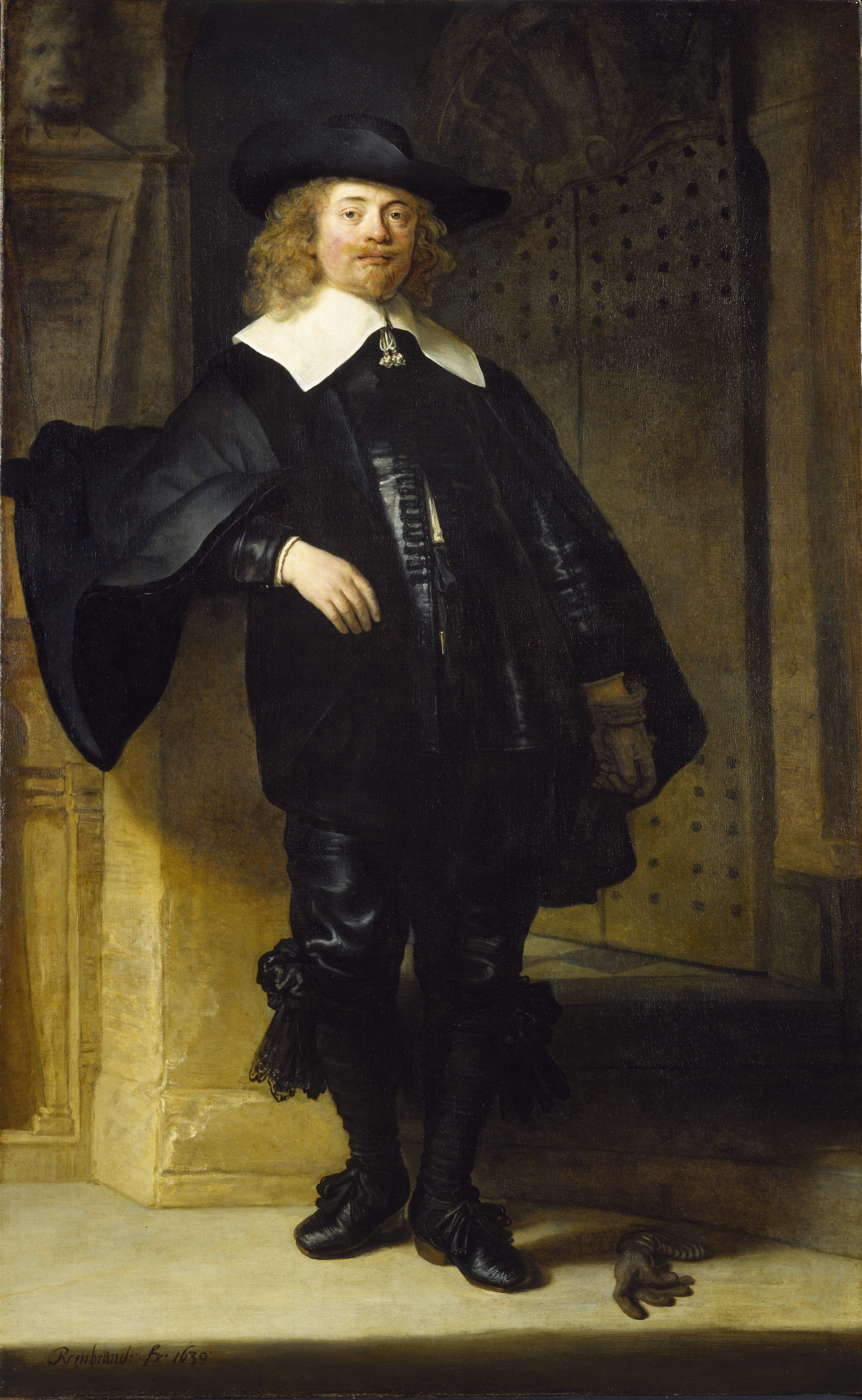
Andries de Graeff

- January 4 – Joan Maetsuycker, Governor-General of the Dutch East Indies (b. 1606)
- January 11 – Ferrante III Gonzaga, Duke of Guastalla, Italian noble (b. 1618)
- January 12 – Robert Ellison, English politician (b. 1614)
- January 23 – Sir William Curtius FRS, German magistrate and English baronet (b. 1599)
- January 27 – Maria Overlander van Purmerland, Dutch noble (b. 1603)
- January 29 – Jeronimo Lobo, Portuguese Jesuit missionary (b. 1593)
- February 7 – Sir Philip Musgrave, 2nd Baronet, English politician (b. 1607)
- November 20 – Daniel Clasen, German academic (b. 1622)
- March 3 – Philip Bell, British colonial governor (b. 1590)
- March 10 – Jean de Launoy, French historian (b. 1603)
- March 27 – Juan de Leyva de la Cerda, conde de Baños, Spanish noble (b. 1604)
- April 12 – Mary Rich, Countess of Warwick, 7th daughter of Richard Boyle (b. 1625)
- April 23 – Walter Aston, 2nd Lord Aston of Forfar, second and eldest surviving son of Walter Aston (b. 1609)
- April 24 – Louis VI, Landgrave of Hesse-Darmstadt (1661–1678) (b. 1630)
- April 27 – Nicolas Roland, French priest and founder (b. 1642)
- May 2 – Willem Nieupoort, Dutch politician, and diplomat (b. 1607)
- May 3 – Bernhard II, Duke of Saxe-Jena, German noble (b. 1638)
- May 4 or May 14 – Anna Maria van Schurman, Dutch poet and scholar (b. 1607)
- May 16 – Tamura Muneyoshi, Japanese daimyō of the Iwanuma Domain (b. 1637)
- May 18 – Miyamoto Iori, Japanese samurai (b. 1612)
- June 2 – Pieter de Groot, Dutch diplomat (b. 1615)
- June 17 – Giacomo Torelli, Italian stage designer, engineer, and architect (b. 1608)
- June 19 – Benedict Arnold, Rhode Island colonial governor (b. 1615)
- June 24 – Charles de Lorme, French physician (b. 1584)
- August 5 – Juan García de Zéspedes, Mexican musician and composer (b. 1619)
- August 16 – Andrew Marvell, English writer (b. 1621)
- August 17 – Guillaume Herincx, Flemish theologian, Bishop of Ypres (b. 1621)
- August 28 – John Berkeley, 1st Baron Berkeley of Stratton, English soldier (b. 1602)
- August 31 – Louis VII, Landgrave of Hesse-Darmstadt (b. 1658)
- September 1 – Jan Brueghel the Younger, Flemish painter (b. 1601)
- September 8 – Pietro della Vecchia, Italian painter (b. 1603)
- September 19 – Christoph Bernhard von Galen, Westphalian Catholic prince-bishop of Münster and military leader (b. 1606)
- September 18 – Maurizio Cazzati, Italian composer (b. 1616)
- October 5 – Hedevig Ulfeldt, daughter of King Christian IV of Denmark and Kirsten Munk (b. 1626)
- October 11 – Sir Peter Leycester, 1st Baronet, British historian (b. 1614)
- October 12
  - Pieter Codde, Dutch painter (b. 1599)
  - Edmund Berry Godfrey, English magistrate (b. 1621)
- October 14 – Sir Richard Newdigate, 1st Baronet, English politician (b. 1602)
- October 16 – Cornelis HrR Ridder de Graeff, Dutch nobleman and chief landholder of the Zijpe and Haze Polder (b. 1650)
- October 18 – Jacob Jordaens, Flemish painter (b. 1593)
- October 19 – Samuel Dirksz van Hoogstraten, Dutch painter (b. c. 1627)
- November 1 – William Coddington, first Governor of Rhode Island (b. 1601)
- November 4 – Solomon Swale, English politician (b. 1610)
- November 5 – Giovan Battista Nani, Italian historian and diplomat (b. 1616)
- November 10 – Daniel Zwicker, German physician (b. 1612)
- November 30 – Andries de Graeff, Dutch politician (b. 1611)
- December 3 – Edward Colman, English Catholic courtier under Charles II (b. 1636)
- December 20 – Matthew Marvin, Sr., Connecticut settler (b. 1600)

1679

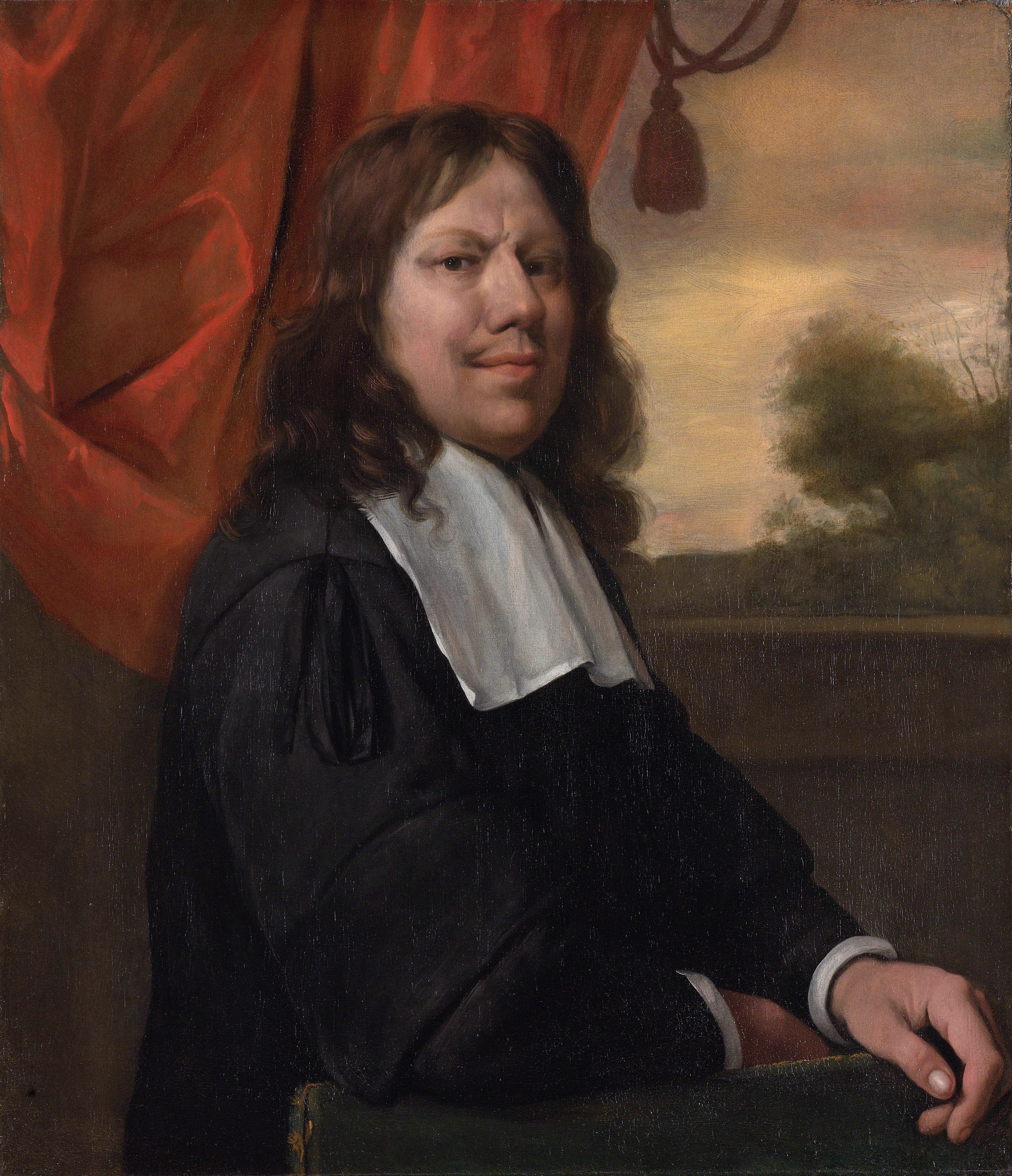
Jan Steen

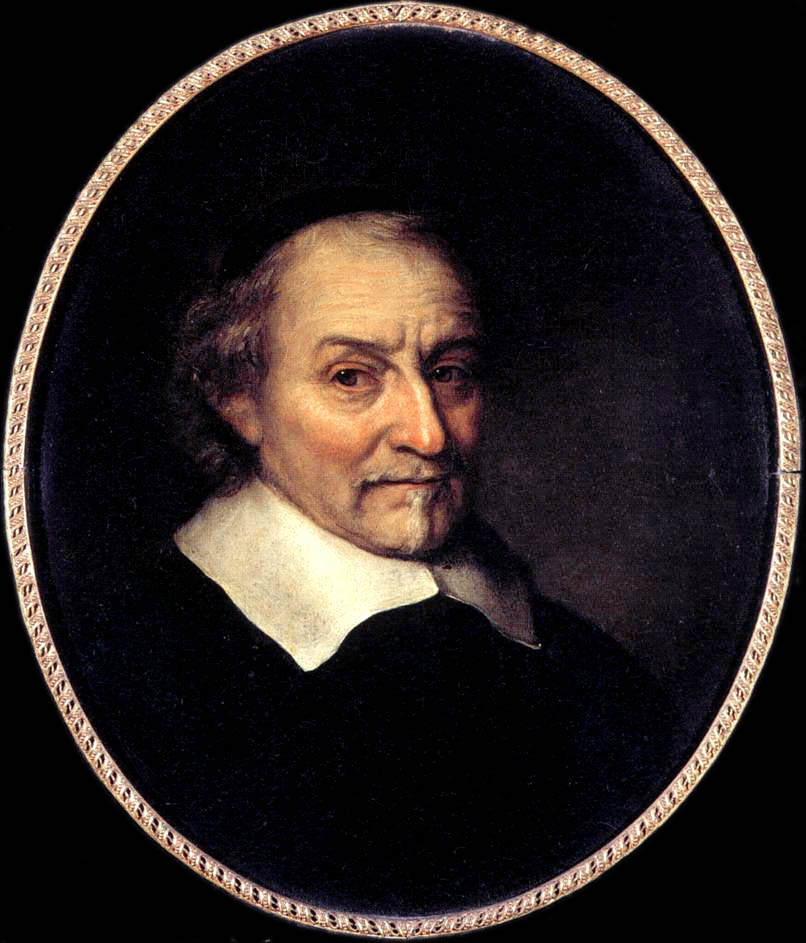
Joost van den Vondel

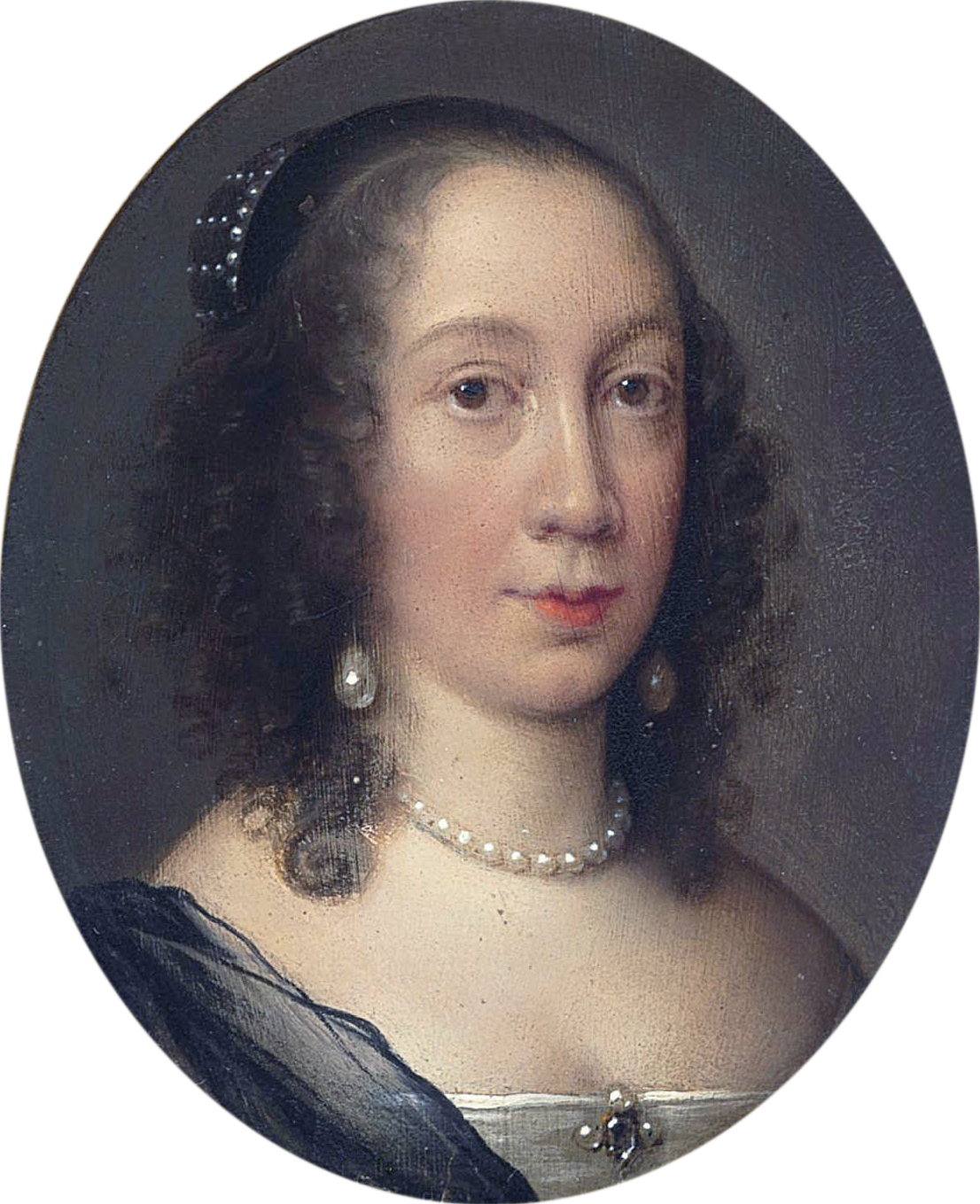
Dorothy, Lady Pakington

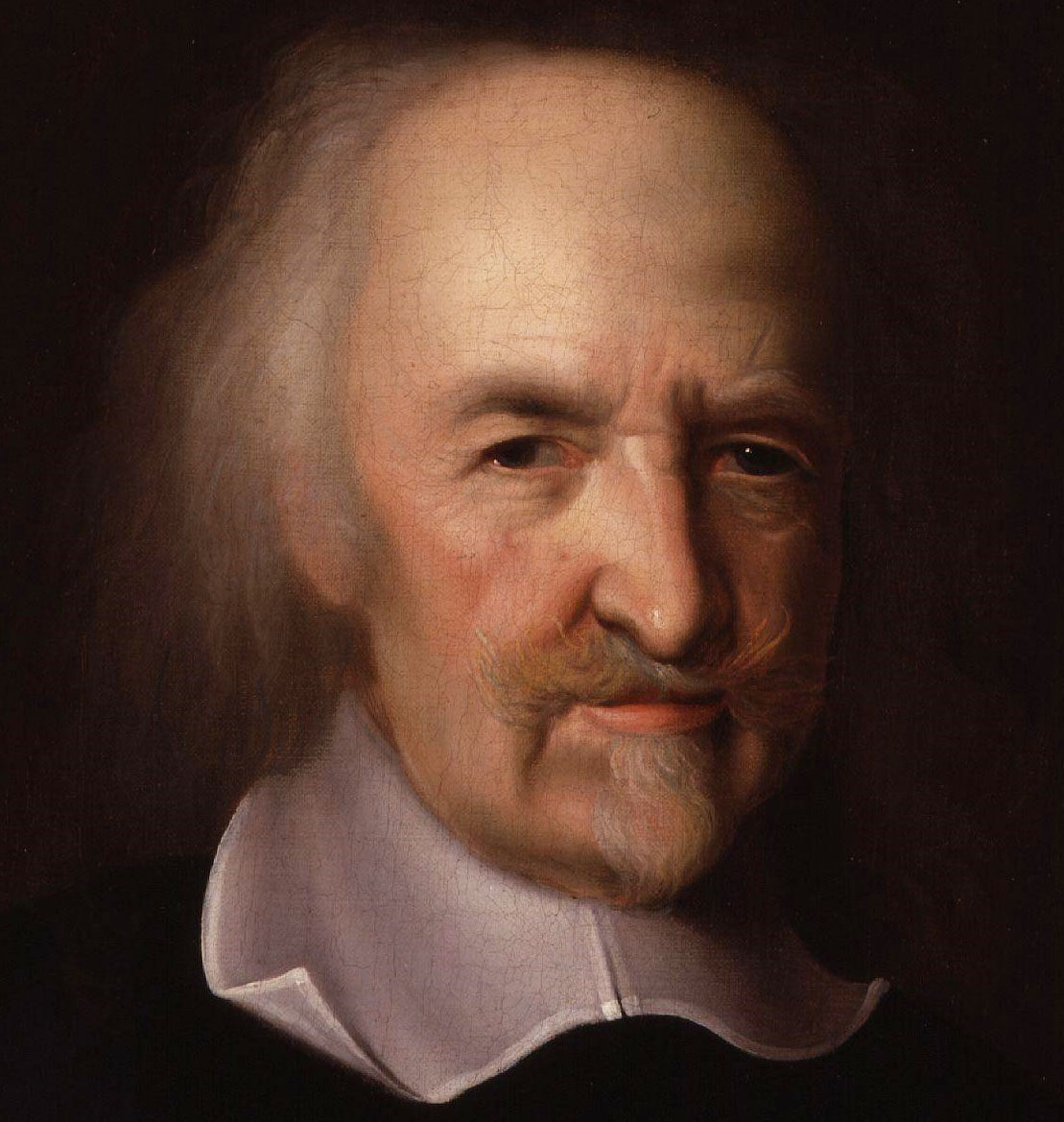
Thomas Hobbes

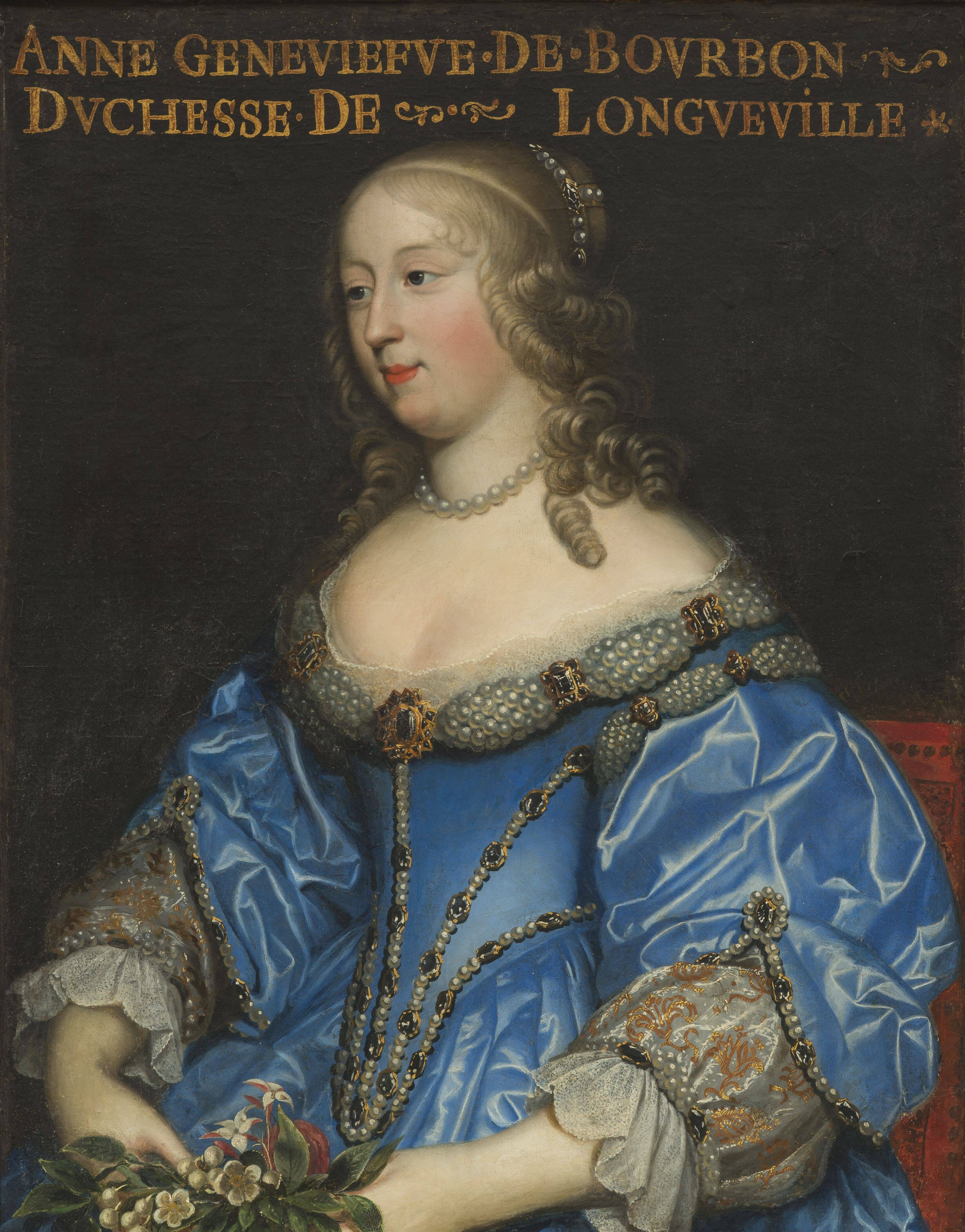
Anne Geneviève de Bourbon

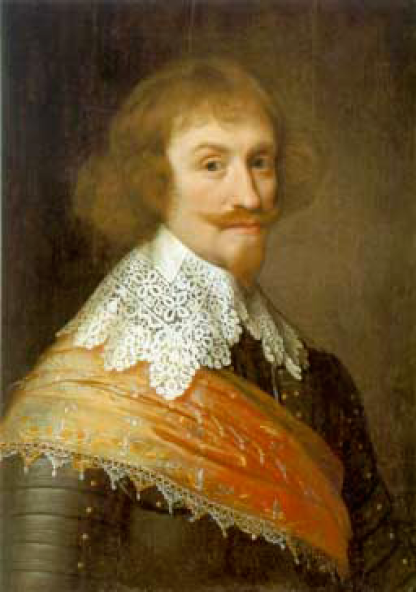
John Maurice

- January 1 – Jan Steen, Dutch painter (b. c. 1626)
- January 8 – Raymond Breton, French missionary (b. 1609)
- January 14 – Jacques de Billy, French Jesuit mathematician (b. 1602)
- January 15 – Pierre Lambert de la Motte, French bishop (b. 1624)
- January 24
  - Ulderico Carpegna, Italian Catholic cardinal (b. 1595)
  - Maurice Henry, Prince of Nassau-Hadamar (1653–1679) (b. 1626)
- January 29 – Carlo Ceresa, Italian painter (b. 1609)
- February 5 – Joost van den Vondel, Dutch dramatist and poet (b. 1587)
- February 6 – Margherita de' Medici, Italian duchess regent of Parma (b. 1612)
- February 18 – Lady Anne Finch Conway, English philosopher (b. 1631)
- February 19 – Henricus Regius, Dutch philosopher (b. 1598)
- February 19 – Thomas Hales, Connecticut settler (b. 1610)
- February 22 – Henrik Rysensteen, Dutch military engineer (b. 1624)
- March 11
  - Sir John Covert, 1st Baronet, English politician (b. 1620)
  - Luise Marie of the Palatinate, German princess (b. 1647)
- March 16
  - John Leverett, Governor of the Massachusetts Bay Colony (b. 1616)
  - Johan Frederik von Marschalck, German-born landowner, Chancellor of Norway (b. 1618)
  - Johannes Schefferus, Alsatian-born humanist (b. 1621)
- March 27 – Abraham Mignon, Dutch golden age painter (b. 1640)
- April – Thomas Notley, Colonial governor of Maryland (b. 1632)
- April 5 – Anne Geneviève de Bourbon, French princess and political activist (b. 1619)
- May 3 – James Sharp, Scottish archbishop (assassinated) (b. 1613)
- May 5 – Magnus Celsius, Swedish astronomer and mathematician (b. 1621)
- May 6 – Peregrine Hoby, English politician (b. 1602)
- May 10 – Dorothy, Lady Pakington, English religious writer (b. 1623)
- May 14 – August of Legnica, Silesian nobleman (b. 1627)
- May 26 – Ferdinand Maria, Elector of Bavaria (b. 1636)
- June 3 – Francisque Millet, Flemish-French painter (b. 1642)
- June 7 – Princess Christine Elisabeth of Schleswig-Holstein-Sonderburg, German noblewoman (b. 1638)
- June 15 – Guillaume Courtois, French painter (b. 1628)
- June 27 – Pablo Bruna, blind Spanish composer and organist (b. 1611)
- July 4 – Antoine Garaby de La Luzerne, French poet (b. 1617)
- July 11 – William Chamberlayne, English poet (b. 1619)
- July 19 – Francis Anderson, English politician (b. 1614)
- July 26 – Edward Bayntun, English politician (b. 1618)
- August – Catherine Lepère, French midwife (b. 1601)
- August 6 – John Snell, English royalist (b. 1629)
- August 12 – Marie de Rohan, French courtier and political activist (b. 1600)
- August 20 – Jacob Alting, Dutch linguist (b. 1618)
- August 24 – Jean François Paul de Gondi, Cardinal de Retz, French churchman and agitator (b. 1614)
- August 28 – Alfonso Litta, Cardinal, Archbishop of Milan (b. 1608)
- August 29 – Margaret Mostyn, English Carmelite nun (b. 1625)
- September 9 – John Gurdon, English politician (b. 1595)
- September 11 – Nicolaes Visscher I (buried), Dutch engraver, cartographer and publisher (b. 1618)
- September 17 – John of Austria the Younger, Spanish general (b. 1629)
- September 25 – Philips Augustijn Immenraet, Flemish painter (b. 1627)
- September 29 – John Manners, 8th Earl of Rutland, English politician when he inherited the peerage (b. 1604)
- October 1 – Antonia of Württemberg, princess, literary figure, patron, and Christian Kabbalist (b. 1613)
- October 2 – Sir William Bowyer, 1st Baronet, English politician (b. 1612)
- October 3 – Hugh Bethell, English Member of Parliament and High Sheriff (b. 1615)
- October 12 – William Gurnall, English writer (b. 1617)
- October 26 – Roger Boyle, 1st Earl of Orrery, British soldier, statesman, and dramatist (b. 1621)
- November 11 – Rosina Schnorr, German businessperson (b. 1618)
- November 19 – Roger Conant, Massachusetts governor, founder of Salem, Massachusetts (b. 1592)
- November 27 – Archibald Primrose, Lord Carrington, Scottish judge (b. 1616)
- December 4 – Thomas Hobbes, English philosopher (b. 1588)
- December 10 – Francesco Barberini, Italian Catholic cardinal (b. 1597)
- December 20 – John Maurice, Prince of Nassau-Siegen (b. 1604)
- December 18 – John Frederick, Duke of Brunswick-Lüneburg, Duke of Brunswick-Calenberg (1665–1679) (b. 1625)
- December 21 – Claude Lamoral, 3rd Prince of Ligne, Spanish general and prince (b. 1618)
- December 28
  - Peder Winstrup, Bishop of Lund (b. 1605)
  - Andrzej Trzebicki, nobleman and priest in the Polish-Lithuanian Commonwealth (b. 1607)
- December 31 – Giovanni Alfonso Borelli, Italian physiologist and physicist (b. 1608)
