= Vater =

Vater (/ˈfɑːtər/) means "father" in German. It is also a surname. It may refer to:

- Abraham Vater, a German anatomist
  - Ampulla of Vater, an anatomic area named after Abraham Vater
- VACTERL association, sometimes called VATER syndrome, a group of congenital anomalies
- Christian Vater (organ builder), a German organ and harpsichord builder
- Antoine Vater, a harpsichord builder in France.
- Vater Percussion, an American drumstick and percussion accessory manufacturer
- Vater (album), a Janus album

== Other uses ==
- Vatër, the domestic hearth in Albanian folklore

== See also ==
- Vader (disambiguation)
