= 1622 =

1622 in various calendars
- Gregorian calendar: 1622; MDCXXII
- Ab urbe condita: 2375
- Armenian calendar: 1071; ԹՎ ՌՀԱ
- Assyrian calendar: 6372
- Balinese saka calendar: 1543–1544
- Bengali calendar: 1028–1029
- Berber calendar: 2572
- English Regnal year: 19 Ja. 1 – 20 Ja. 1
- Buddhist calendar: 2166
- Burmese calendar: 984
- Byzantine calendar: 7130–7131
- Chinese calendar: 辛酉年 (Metal Rooster); 4319 or 4112 — to — 壬戌年 (Water Dog); 4320 or 4113
- Coptic calendar: 1338–1339
- Discordian calendar: 2788
- Ethiopian calendar: 1614–1615
- Hebrew calendar: 5382–5383
- Hindu calendars
- Vikram Samvat: 1678–1679
- Shaka Samvat: 1543–1544
- Kali Yuga: 4722–4723
- Holocene calendar: 11622
- Igbo calendar: 622–623
- Iranian calendar: 1000–1001
- Islamic calendar: 1031–1032
- Japanese calendar: Genna 8 (元和８年)
- Javanese calendar: 1543–1544
- Julian calendar: Gregorian minus 10 days
- Korean calendar: 3955
- Minguo calendar: 290 before ROC 民前290年
- Nanakshahi calendar: 154
- Thai solar calendar: 2164–2165
- Tibetan calendar: ལྕགས་མོ་བྱ་ལོ་ (female Iron-Bird); 1748 or 1367 or 595 — to — ཆུ་ཕོ་ཁྱི་ལོ་ (male Water-Dog); 1749 or 1368 or 596

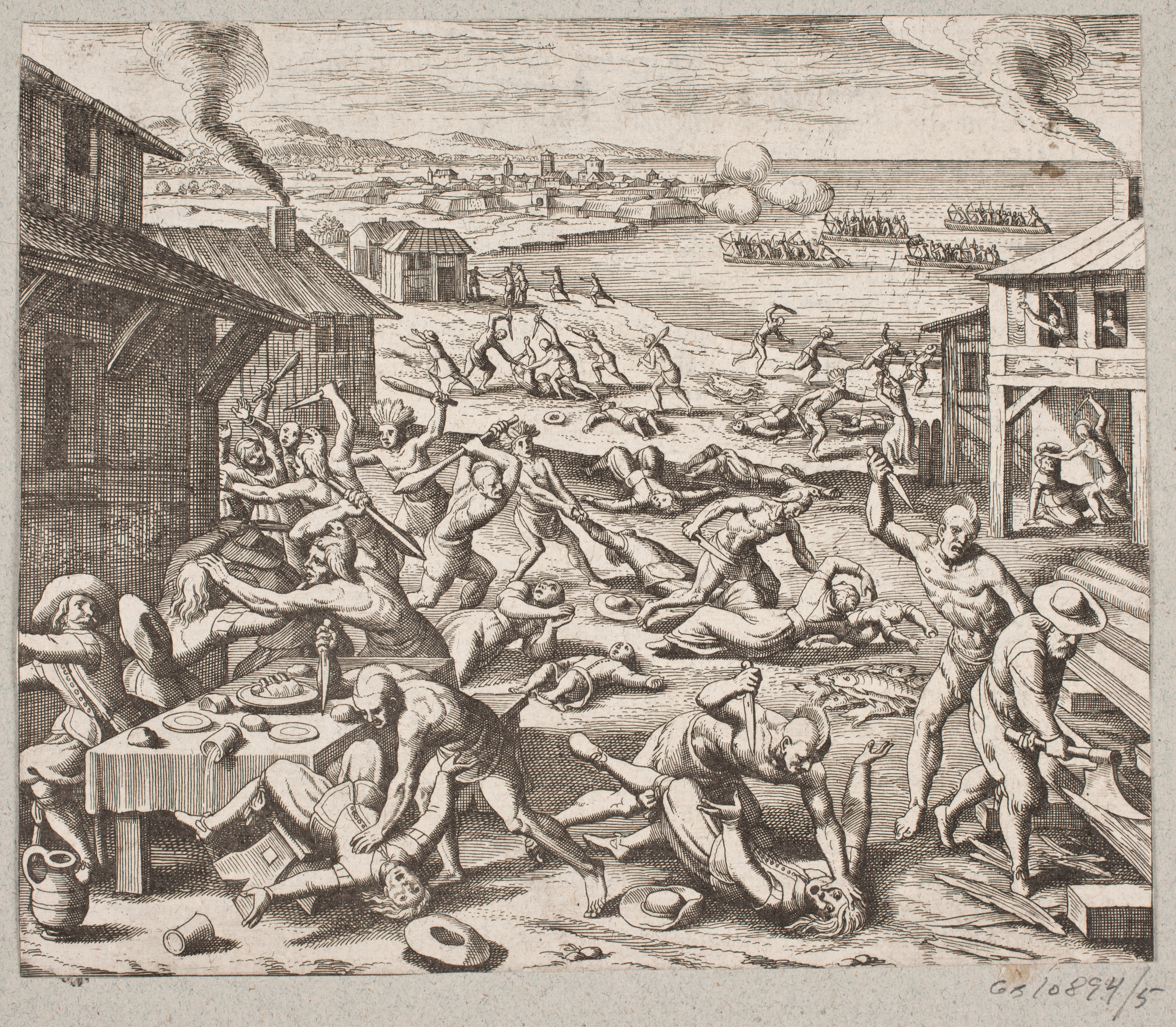
March 22: The Jamestown massacre of 347 English settlers takes place

1622 (MDCXXII) was a common year starting on Saturday of the Gregorian calendar and a common year starting on Tuesday of the Julian calendar, the 1622nd year of the Common Era (CE) and Anno Domini (AD) designations, the 622nd year of the 2nd millennium, the 22nd year of the 17th century, and the 3rd year of the 1620s decade. As of the start of 1622, the Gregorian calendar was 10 days ahead of the Julian calendar, which remained in localized use until 1923.

== Events ==
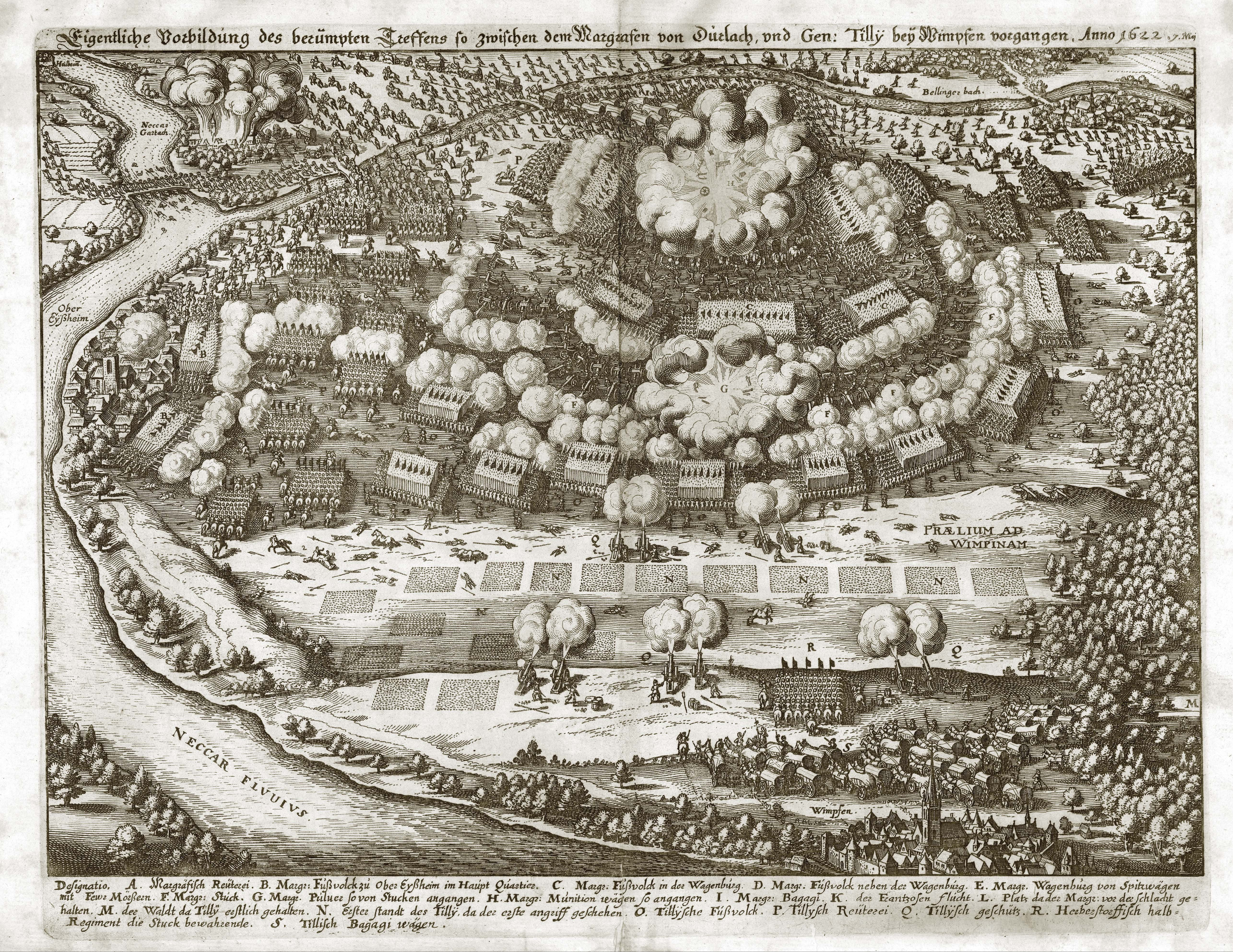
May 6: The Battle of Wimpfen.

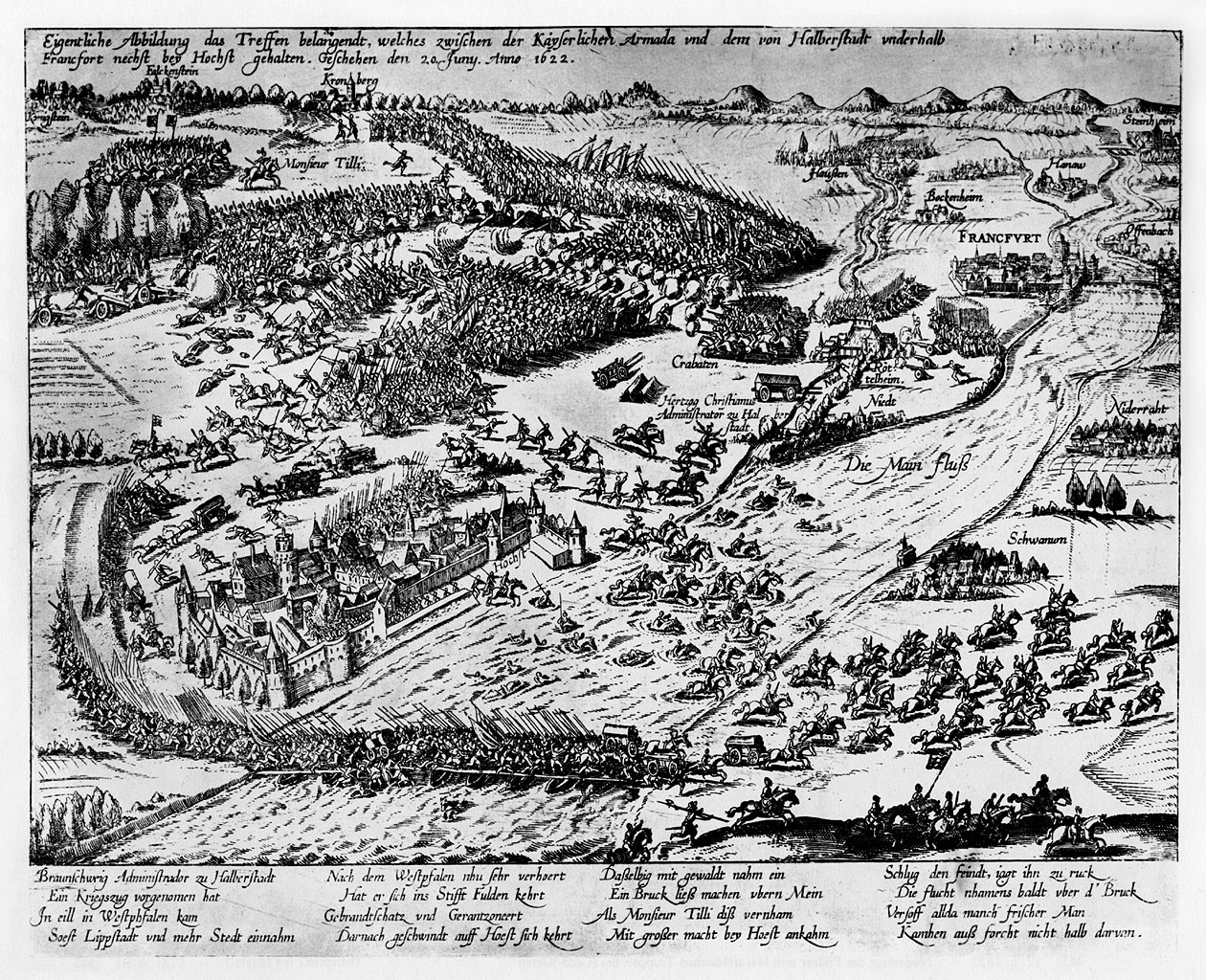
June 20: The Battle of Höchst.

=== January–May ===
- January 7 – The Holy Roman Empire and Transylvania sign the Peace of Nikolsburg.
- February 8 – King James I of England dissolves the English Parliament.
- March 12 – Ignatius of Loyola, Francis Xavier, Teresa of Ávila, Isidore the Farmer and Philip Neri are canonized by Pope Gregory XV.
- March 22 – Jamestown massacre: Algonquian natives kill 347 English settlers outside Jamestown, Virginia (one third of the colony's population), and burn the Henricus settlement. This begins the American Indian Wars.

=== April–June ===
- April 22 – Hormuz is captured from the Portuguese, by an Anglo-Persian force.
- April 27 – Thirty Years' War – Skirmish at Mingolsheim: Protestant forces under Mansfeld and Georg Friedrich of Baden-Durlach defeat the Imperial forces under Tilly. The Protestants win, but afterwards Tilly links up with a Spanish army under Gonzalo de Córdoba, greatly increasing his strength.
- May 6 – Thirty Years' War: While waiting for the Protestant forces of Christian the Younger of Brunswick to join them, Mansfeld and Georg Friedrich of Baden-Durlach split up their forces as a diversion for the Imperial army of Tilly. Their plan fails, as Tilly manages to cut off Georg Friedrich at Wimpfen. At the ensuing Battle of Wimpfen, Georg Friedrich's army is almost completely destroyed.
- May 13 – The Eendracht, a VOC ship and the second recorded European ship to make landfall on Australian soil, is wrecked off the western coast of Ambon Island, Dutch East Indies.
- May 20 – Ottoman Sultan Osman II is strangled by rebelling Janissaries, who revolted when they heard rumours that Osman II was planning to move against them.
- May 25 – The English ship Tryall, which left Plymouth, England for Batavia (now Jakarta), wrecks on the Tryal Rocks, nine months later (the wreck is discovered in 1969).
- May – Huguenot rebellions: The Huguenot city of Royan is taken by royal forces, after a short siege.
- June 11 – Huguenot rebellions: The Huguenot city of Nègrepelisse is taken, after a short siege by royal forces. The entire population of the city is subsequently massacred, and the city is burned to the ground.
- June 20 – Thirty Years' War: Imperial forces under Tilly attempt to prevent Christian the Younger of Brunswick from moving his army across the Main River, to link up with Mansfeld. At the Battle of Höchst, Tilly manages to inflict considerable casualties on the Protestant forces, as well as seizing Brunswick's baggage train. Nonetheless, the bulk of Brunswick's forces manage to unite with Mansfeld.
- June 24 – Dutch–Portuguese War – Battle of Macau: The outnumbered Portuguese forces successfully defend Macau from the Dutch fleet, keeping a Portuguese foothold in the Far East.

=== July–September ===
- July 13 – Thirty Years' War: After Mansfeld fails to relieve the siege of Heidelberg, Frederick V of the Palatinate cancels Mansfeld's contract and disbands his army. The unemployed army of Mansfeld and Christian the Younger of Brunswick is subsequently hired by the Dutch.
- July 13 or July 14 – English and Dutch ships defeat the Portuguese, near Portuguese East Africa.
- July 18 – Eighty Years' War: Bergen op Zoom is besieged by a Spanish army, under the command of Ambrogio Spinola.
- August 29 – Thirty Years' War: While on their way to relieve the Siege of Bergen-op-Zoom in the Netherlands, the army of Mansfeld and Christian of Brunswick is blocked by a Spanish army, led by Gonzalo de Córdoba. In the Battle of Fleurus, Cordoba manages to fight off the Protestant assault. The next day, Cordoba surprises the retreating Protestant army with his cavalry, resulting in the destruction of most of the Protestant army.
- September 5 – Armand Jean du Plessis becomes Cardinal Richelieu.
- September 6 – Spanish treasure fleet sinks off Marquesas Keys in the straits of Florida. Atocha, Margarita, and Rosario are the most heavily laden treasure ships found in the 20th century.
- September 10 – 55 Christians are executed in Nagasaki during the Great Genna Martyrdom.
- September 19 – Thirty Years' War: Heidelberg, the capital of the Electorate of the Palatinate, is taken by the Imperial army of Tilly' after a three-month siege.

=== October–December ===
- October 2 – Eighty Years' War: After a siege of 86 days, Bergen op Zoom is relieved by a Dutch army led by Maurice of Nassau and Ernst von Mansfeld.
- October 18 – Huguenot rebellions: The first Huguenot rebellion ends, with the signing of the Treaty of Montpellier.
- October 27 – Huguenot rebellions: The inconclusive Naval battle of Saint-Martin-de-Ré is fought between the Huguenot fleet of La Rochelle, commanded by Jean Guiton, and a royal fleet under the command of Charles of Guise.
- November 2 – After a siege of 13 days, the German city of Mannheim is captured from England by a force of Spanish and Imperial Holy Roman troops led by Johann Tserclaes, Count of Tilly.
- November 25 – King Christian IV of Denmark invites the Sephardic Jews of Amsterdam in the Dutch Republic to settle in the newly-built Danish town of Lykstad, promising them the free exercise of their religion without persecution. The city remains part of Denmark until 1864 until it is captured in the Second Schleswig War and is now part of Germany as Glückstadt.
- November 30 – A fleet of 43 Dutch ships from Suriname attacks the Araya Peninsula in Venezuela in an attempt to halt construction of a Spanish fortress. The Spanish drive the Dutch away after six weeks of fighting, ending January 13, 1623.
- December 18 – Portuguese forces with Imbangala allies score a military victory over the Kingdom of Kongo at the Battle of Mbumbi in modern-day Angola as part of the First Kongo-Portuguese War.
- December 22 – The Spanish colonial city of Bucaramanga is founded in the colony of Nueva Grandada in what is now Colombia.

=== Date unknown ===
- Dutch ships under Jochem Swartenhont, while escorting a convoy, repel a Spanish squadron near Gibraltar.
- Portugal loses control of the island of Ormus, after 107 years.
- Albertus Magnus is beatified, and Teresa of Ávila is canonized, by the Roman Catholic Church.
- Rosicrucianism furor breaks out in Paris.
- War between the Netherlands and Spain recommences, after the Twelve Years' Truce (1609–1621).
- The Golden Horn freezes.
- First record of bottled spring water in England at Holy Well, Malvern.

== Births ==
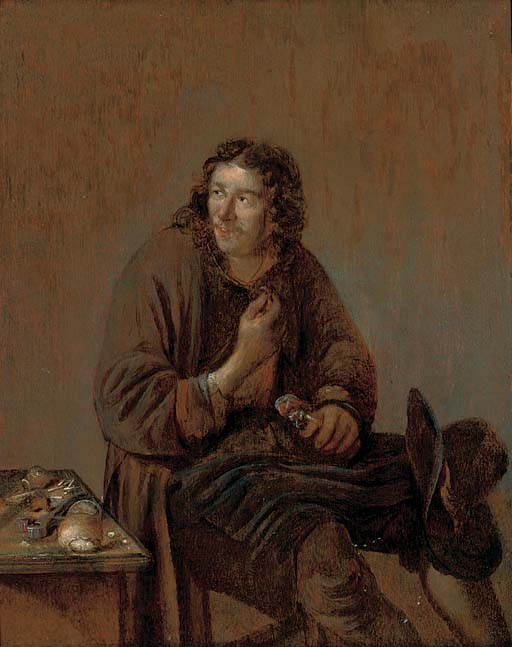
Abraham Diepraam

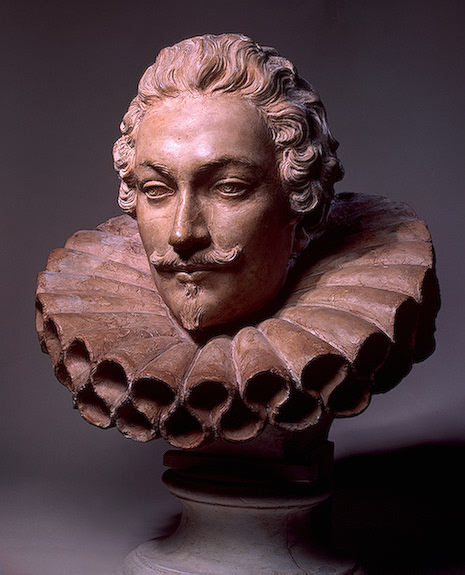
Camillo Francesco Maria Pamphili

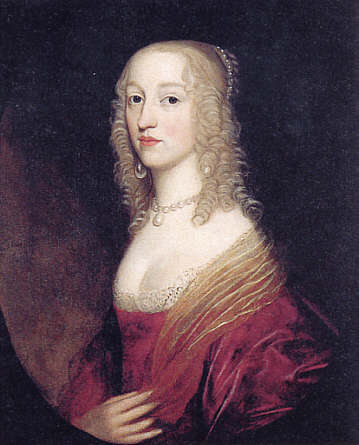
Louise Hollandine of the Palatinate

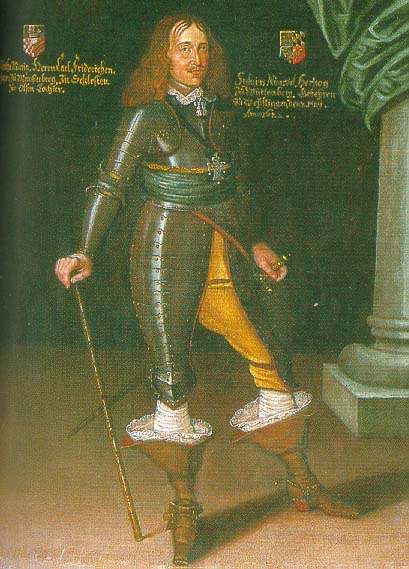
Silvius I Nimrod, Duke of Württemberg-Oels

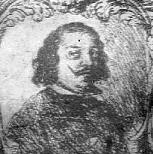
Juan de Valdés Leal

=== January–March ===
- January 1 – Isaac Sweers, Dutch admiral (d. 1673)
- January 3 – Sir Humphrey Winch, 1st Baronet, English Member of Parliament (d. 1703)
- January 11 – Louis, Duke of Joyeuse, younger son of Charles (d. 1654)
- January 13 – Thomas Dolman, English politician (d. 1697)
- January 15 – Molière, French playwright (d. 1673)
- January 16 – Anna Margareta von Haugwitz, Swedish countess (d. 1673)
- January 23 – Abraham Diepraam, Dutch painter (d. 1670)
- January 28
  - Adrien Auzout, French astronomer (d. 1691)
  - Richard Verney, 11th Baron Willoughby de Broke, English baron (d. 1711)
- February 7 – Vittoria della Rovere, Italian noble (d. 1694)
- February 15 – Adam Pynacker, Dutch painter (d. 1673)
- February 21 – Camillo Francesco Maria Pamphili, Italian Catholic cardinal (d. 1666)
- February 24 – Johannes Clauberg, German theologian and philosopher (d. 1665)
- February 25 – Christian Louis, Duke of Brunswick-Lüneburg (d. 1665)
- February 26 – Ludovico Maria Sinistrari, Italian Franciscan priest and author (d. 1701)
- February 27 – Carel Fabritius, Dutch painter (d. 1654)
- March 4 – Thomas Fox, English lawyer and politician (d. 1666)
- March 10 – Johann Rahn, Swiss mathematician (d. 1676)
- March 28 – Ermes di Colorêt, Italian poet, political figure (d. 1692)

=== April–June ===
- April 5 – Vincenzo Viviani, Italian mathematician and scientist (d. 1703)
- April 7 – Carlo Pio di Savoia, Italian Catholic cardinal (d. 1689)
- April 8 – Lebrecht, Prince of Anhalt-Köthen, German prince of the House of Ascania (d. 1669)
- April 10 – Samuel Wilbur, Jr., American colonial settler of Rhode Island (d. 1697)
- April 11 – Jan van Vliet, Dutch linguist (d. 1666)
- April 12 – Johann Christian von Boyneburg, German politician (d. 1672)
- April 18 – Louise Hollandine of the Palatinate, German artist (d. 1709)
- April 23 – Sir Arthur Onslow, 1st Baronet, English politician (d. 1688)
- April 30 – Giovanni Maria Morandi, Italian painter (d. 1717)
- May 1
  - Daniel Clasen, German academic (d. 1678)
  - Sir Henry Goring, 2nd Baronet, English politician (d. 1702)
- May 2 – Silvius I Nimrod, Duke of Württemberg-Oels (d. 1664)
- May 4 – Juan de Valdés Leal, Spanish painter and etcher (d. 1690)
- May 8
  - Capel Luckyn, English Member of Parliament (d. 1680)
  - Claes Rålamb, Swedish statesman (d. 1698)
- May 9 – Jean Pecquet, French anatomist (d. 1674)
- May 22 – Louis de Buade de Frontenac, Governor of New France (d. 1698)
- June 6 – Claude-Jean Allouez, French Jesuit missionary and explorer of North America (d. 1689)
- June 11 – Samuel Fortrey, English author (d. 1681)
- June 23 – Sir Richard Cust, 1st Baronet, English politician (d. 1700)
- June 24 – Charles Worsley, English soldier and politician (d. 1656)

=== July–September ===
- July 2 – René-François de Sluse, Walloon mathematician (d. 1685)
- July 14 – Sir William Armine, 2nd Baronet, English politician (d. 1658)
- July 26 – Christian Augustus, Count Palatine of Sulzbach (1632-1708) (d. 1708)
- July 28 – George Montagu, English politician (d. 1681)
- August 3 – Wolfgang Julius, Count of Hohenlohe-Neuenstein, German field marshal (d. 1698)
- August 6 – Tjerk Hiddes de Vries, Dutch admiral (d. 1666)
- August 19 – James Compton, 3rd Earl of Northampton, English politician (d. 1681)
- August 24 – Samuel Lincoln, American colonial ancestor of Abraham Lincoln (d. 1690)
- August 27 – Jakob Thomasius, German philosopher (d. 1684)
- September 21 – Yamaga Sokō, Japanese philosopher (d. 1685)
- September 22 – Jacques Savary, successful French merchant (d. 1690)
- September 24 – Georg Händel, German musician (d. 1697)
- September 30 – Johann Sebastiani, German Baroque composer (d. 1683)

=== October–December ===
- October 13 – Sir Ralph Delaval, 1st Baronet, English politician (d. 1691)
- October 15 – Magnus Gabriel De la Gardie, Swedish statesman and military man (d. 1686)
- November 8 – Charles X Gustav, King of Sweden (d. 1660)
- November 15 – Anthony Ettrick, English politician (d. 1703)
- November 30
  - Thomas van Apshoven, Flemish painter (d. 1664)
  - Robert van den Hoecke, Flemish painter (d. 1668)
- December 16 – Cort Adeler, Dutch seaman (d. 1675)
- December 21 – Tomasz Młodzianowski, Polish Jesuit, preacher and writer (d. 1686)
- December 22 – Emanuel Murant, Dutch painter (d. 1700)
- December 27 – Teofil Rutka, Polish philosopher (d. 1700)
- December 29 – Thomas Herle, English politician (d. 1681)

== Deaths ==
=== January–March ===
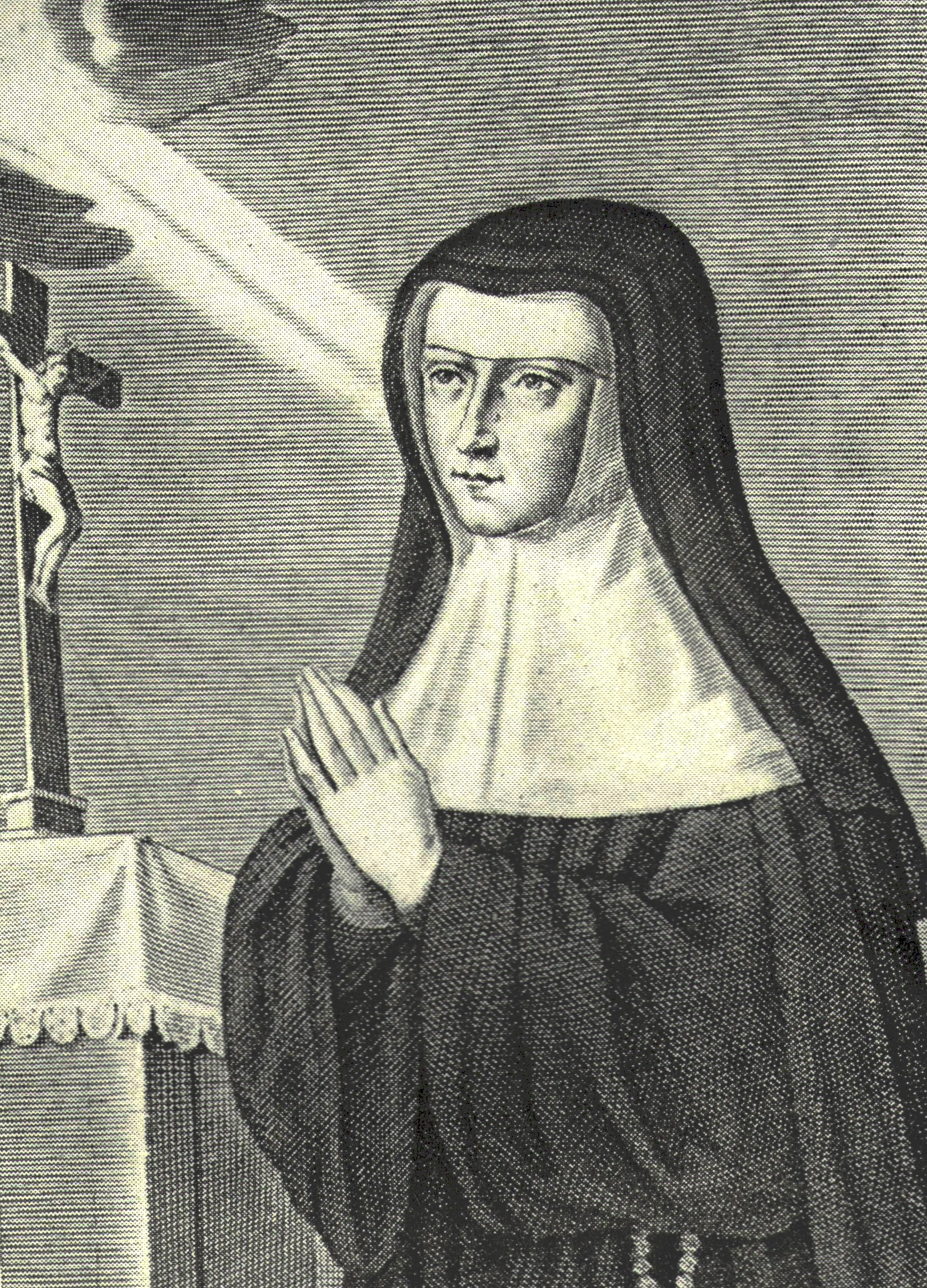
Alix Le Clerc

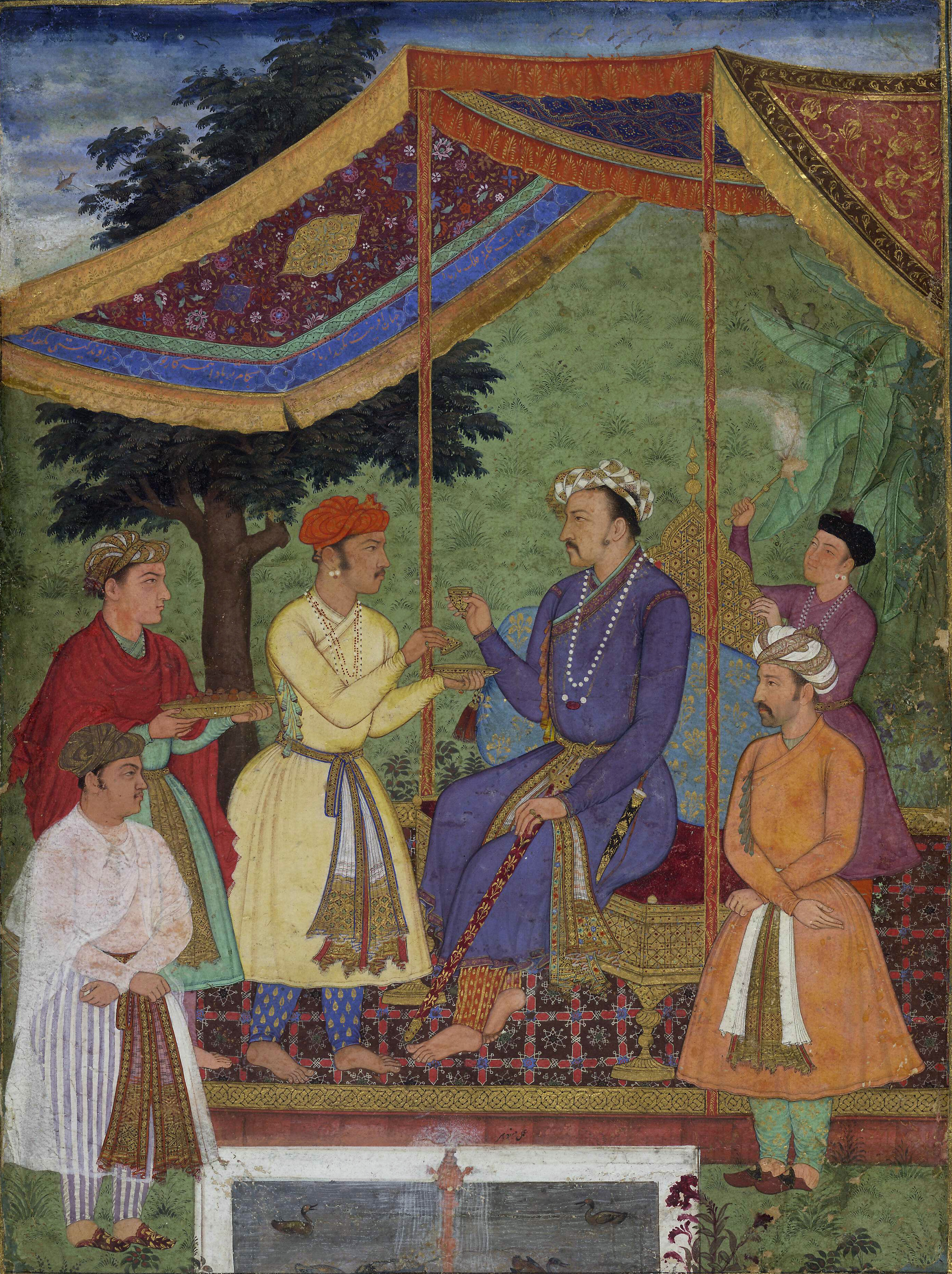
Khusrau Mirza

- January 1 – Jakob Hassler, German composer (b. 1569)
- January 9 – Alix Le Clerc, French Roman Catholic Canoness Regular, foundress and blessed (b. 1576)
- January 17 – Ernst of Schaumburg, Count of Holstein-Pinneberg and Schaumburg (1601–1622) (b. 1569)
- January 23 – William Baffin, English explorer (b. 1584)
- January 26 – Khusrau Mirza, Mughal prince (b. 1587)
- January 31 – Francis Norris, 1st Earl of Berkshire, English noble (b. 1579)
- February 11 – Alfonso Fontanelli, Italian composer (b. 1557)
- February 19
  - Sir Henry Savile, English educator (b. 1549)
  - Frans Pourbus the Younger, Flemish painter (b. 1569)
- February 20 – Juan de Valle y Arredondo, Spanish Catholic prelate, Bishop of Guadalajara (1607–1617) (b. 1567)
- March 5 – Ranuccio I Farnese, Duke of Parma (b. 1569)
- March 29 – Honda Yasutoshi, Japanese samurai (b. 1570)
- March 31 – Gonzalo Méndez de Canço, Royal Governor of La Florida (b. 1554)

=== April–June ===
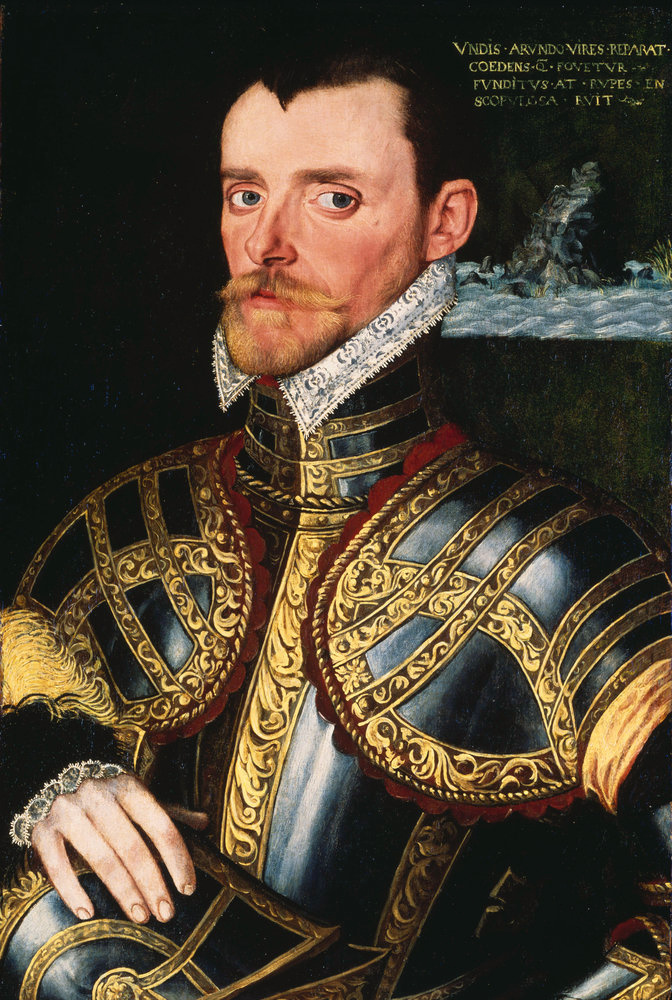
Richard Hawkins

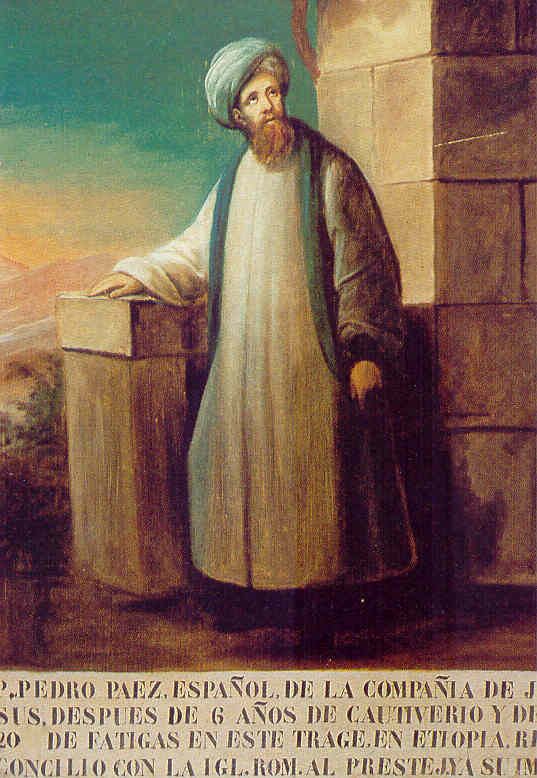
Pedro Páez

- April 5 – Vincenzo Filliucci, Italian Jesuit (b. 1566)
- April 13
  - Katharina Kepler, alleged German witch (b. 1546)
  - Johannetta of Sayn-Wittgenstein, German noblewoman (b. 1561)
- April 14 – Antoine de Gaudier, French Jesuit writer (b. 1572)
- April 15 – Leandro Bassano, Italian painter (b. 1557)
- April 17 – Richard Hawkins, 17th-century English seaman (b. c. 1562)
- April 24 – Fidelis of Sigmaringen, German Roman Catholic and Capuchin friar, missionary and saint (b. 1577)
- May 15 – Petrus Plancius, Dutch-Flemish astronomer and cartographer (b. 1552)
- May 20 – Osman II, Ottoman Sultan (b. 1604)
- May 22 – Juan Beltrán Guevara y Figueroa, Spanish Catholic prelate, Archbishop of Santiago de Compostela (1603–1614) (b. 1540)
- May 25 – Pedro Páez, Spanish Jesuit missionary in Ethiopia (b. 1564)
- June 4 – Péter Révay, Hungarian historian (b. 1568)
- June 15 – David Pareus, German theologian (b. 1548)
- June 21 – Salomon Schweigger, German theologian (b. 1551)

=== July–September ===
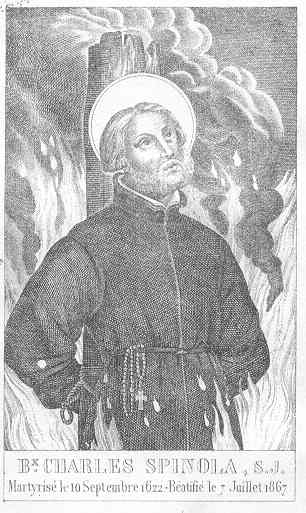
Charles Spinola

- July 1 – William Parker, 4th Baron Monteagle, British politician (b. 1575)
- August 7 – Anfiyanggū, Manchu official (b. 1559)
- August 10 – Giovanni Battista Viola, Italian painter (b. 1576)
- August 13 – Henri de Gondi, Catholic cardinal (b. 1572)
- August 29 – Duke Frederick of Saxe-Weimar, German prince and colonel on the Protestant side in the Thirty Years' War (b. 1596)
- September 7 – Denis Godefroy, French jurist (b. 1549)
- September 10 – Charles Spinola, Italian Jesuit missionary, martyr and blessed (b. 1564)
- September 14 – Alof de Wignacourt, French 54th Grandmaster of the Knights Hospitaller (b. 1547)
- September 29 – Conrad Vorstius, German-Dutch Remonstrant theologian (b. 1569)

=== October–December ===
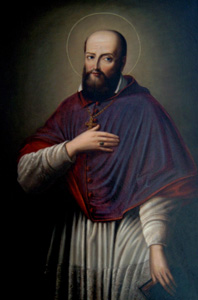
Francis de Sales

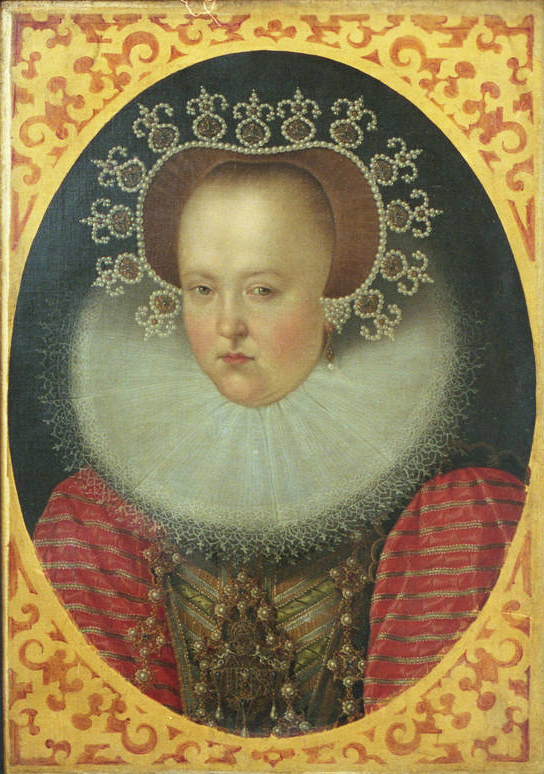
Sophie of Brandenburg

- October 9 – John II, Duke of Schleswig-Holstein-Sonderburg (b. 1545)
- October 28 – Peter Petreius, Swedish writer and diplomat (b. 1570)
- October 31 – Ulrich, Duke of Pomerania, Bishop of Cammin and non-reigning Duke of Pomerania (b. 1589)
- November 2 – Johann Lohel, Bohemian Catholic archbishop (b. 1549)
- November 12 – Sir George Savile, 1st Baronet of England (b. 1551)
- November 14 – Miler Magrath, Irish Catholic priest (b. 1523)
- November 17 – Pierre Biard, French settler, Jesuit missionary (b. 1567)
- Late November – Squanto (Tisquantum), Native American, last survivor of the Patuxet
- December 7 – Sophie of Brandenburg, Regent of Saxony (1591–1601) (b. 1568)
- December 12 – Bartolomeo Manfredi, Italian painter (b. 1582)
- December 13 – Johannes Vodnianus Campanus, Czech humanist, composer and dramatist (b. 1572)
- December 28 – Francis de Sales, Bishop of Geneva and saint (b. 1567)

=== Date unknown ===
- John Welsh of Ayr, Scottish Presbyterian leader (b. 1568)
