= Christian Vater (organ builder) =

Organ and harpsichord builder (1679–1756)

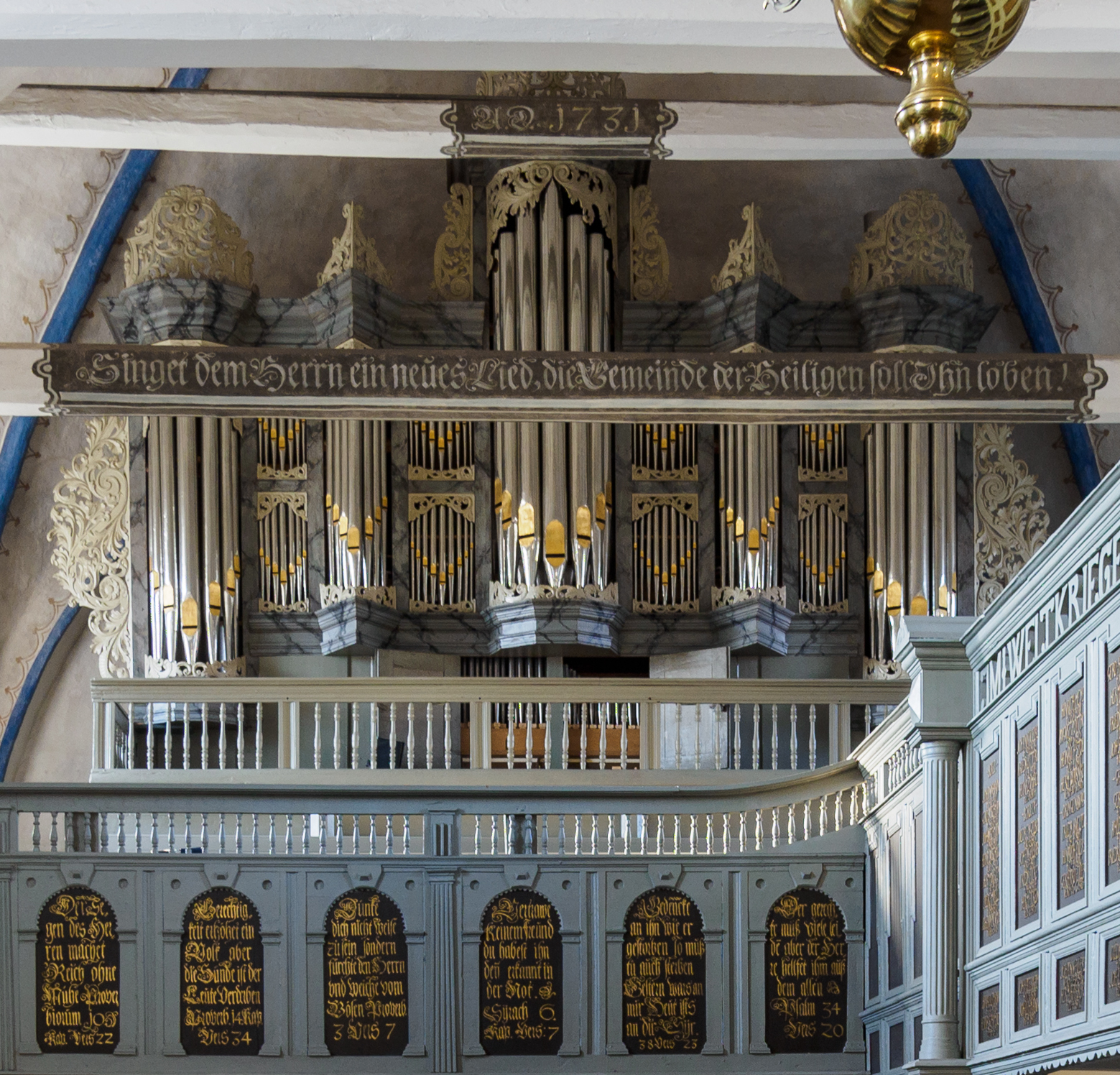
The Vater organ of the St.-Johannis-Kirche, Wiefelstede

Christian Vater (11 October 1679 – 25 January 1756) was a German organ and harpsichord builder.

He was born in Hanover; his father Martin Vater was an organ builder and gave him his first instruction in the craft. He went on to work for Arp Schnitger as a journeyman between 1697 and 1700. He worked independently from c.1702. He was organist to the court of the Elector of Hanover from 1708–1709, and became organ builder to the court in 1714, a role in which his son Johannes would follow him. By 1717 he had built or renovated thirty-three organs. He mainly worked in Hanover and surrounding places: Osnabrück and Oldenburg. Outside this area, he worked in Kassel and Darmstadt; he also built an organ for the Oude Kerk in Amsterdam, 1724–1726, and rebuilt an organ in the Westerkerk in 1726.

Aside from organs, he made harpsichords and clavichords. Only one harpsichord of his has survived, dated 1738, it has a single manual, two 8' choirs and a buff stop, is of short scale and strung in brass. It has a characteristic german double bentside and is rather modestly decorated with gilded geometric knots on the cheek and bentside. The instrument is well preserved (Germanisches Nationalmuseum, Nüremberg, Germany) and of good quality, making it a popular model for copying.

His surviving organs are at Bockhorn, Oldenburg (1722); Oude Kerk, Amsterdam (1726); Wiefelstede, Oldenburg (c.1729); St Nikolai, Gifhorn (1748) and Hohenrode, Bad Hersfeld (1749); remnants such as cases and pipework survive elsewhere. His organs have well-balanced specifications and are typical of the late northern German Baroque organ.

Parisian harpsichord maker Antoine Vater was his brother, and taught Henri Hemsch.

== See also ==
- List of historical harpsichord makers

== Sources ==
- Hans Klotz: 'Vater, Christian', Grove Music Online ed. L. Macy (Accessed 2007-05-18), http://www.grovemusic.com/
- Kottick EL, A History of the Harpsichord, 2003, Indiana University Press
