= Claude Noisette de Crauzat =

French musicologist and organ specialist

Claude Noisette de Crauzat is a contemporary French musicologist, specializing in the study of works for pipe organ.

== Biography ==
Claude Noisette de Crauzat is the author of numerous books on the organ and has directed several theses of musicology. He also published recordings of works by Jean-Philippe Rameau.

== Publications ==
=== Notables works ===
- L'orgue de la cathédrale de Bayeux, Caen, Art de Basse-Normandie No 59, 1972, 38 pages OCLC 492742606.
- L'orgue en Bretagne sous l'ancien régime, doctoral thesis, directed by Jacques Chailley (Université Paris-Sorbonne) 1973, 4 vols. 880 pages} OCLC 492228970, 863126549.
- Connaître Rouen, La Musique à Rouen, Jehan Titelouze, with Max Pinchard, Rouen, Lecerf, 1976.
- L'orgue dans la société française, photographs by Jean-Paul Dumontier, Paris, series "Musique, musicologie" No 6, H. Champion, 1979 OCLC 609653187.
- Cavaillé-Coll, photographs by Jean-Paul Dumontier, Paris, la Flûte de Pan, 1984, 464 pages OCLC 63815731.
- L'Orgue français, photographs by Jean-Paul Dumontier, Paris, Éditions Atlas, 1986 OCLC 237512173.

=== Other works ===
- De la virtuosité dans l'orgue français au XIXème siècle : Lefebure-Wely, 1987. Article on Persée
- Les Dialogues des Carmélites: Opéra de Francis Poulenc d’après un texte de Georges Bernanos, thesis of musicology by Marie-Paule Courboulin, directed by Claude Noisette de Crauzat, 1988.
- Les orgues néoclassiques en Normandie: études de la facture instrumentale et de l'écriture musicale, études historiques et analyses techniques de quelques instruments normands, thesis of musicology by Isabelle Grévrend, directed by Claude Noisette de Crauzat, Rouen, 2006.
- La vie musicale en Seine-Inférieure pendant la seconde guerre mondiale, thesis of musicology by Bénédicte Percheron, directed by Claude Noisette de Crauzat, Rouen, 2007.
- La manufacture d'orgues Krischer, thesis of musicology by Marie-Astrid Normand, directed by Frédéric Billiet, Sorbonne, 2011.

=== Discographic notes ===
- Robert Veyron-Lacroix plays Jean-Philippe Rameau, World Record Club, The Record Society, 1971.
- Robert Veyron-Lacroix interprète Rameau, harpsichord Hemsch 1755-1756 (LP Erato Records) OCLC 301579623.
- Robert Veyron-Lacroix, Rameau: Selected Harpsichord Works (LP Musical Heritage Society, 1972) OCLC 3647265.
- Jean-Patrice Brosse, Premier Livre d'orgue by Nicolas Lebègue (July 1981, Arion ARN268561) OCLC 658332068.
- Pierre Cochereau, aux grandes orgues de Notre-Dame de Paris : Bach, Franck, Boellmann, Widor, Vierne, Messiaen, Cochereau (1965/1973, Philips 412 704-2) OCLC 658462367
