= Vader (disambiguation) =

Vader most commonly refers to Darth Vader, a major villain from the Star Wars franchise. It may refer to:

== Arts and entertainment ==
- Chad Vader, the title character of the American comedy fan web series Chad Vader: Day Shift Manager
- a title character of Vader & Zoon, a Dutch newspaper comic strip by Peter van Straaten
- Vader (band), a Polish death metal band

== Places ==
- Vader (crater), a crater on Pluto's moon Charon named after Darth Vader
- Vader, Washington, United States, a city

== People ==
- Artur Vader (1920–1978), Estonian Soviet politician
- Els Vader (1959–2021), Dutch sprinter
- Milan Vader (born 1996), Dutch cyclist
- Travis Vader, convicted killer
- Big Van Vader (1955–2018), American professional wrestler

== Other ==
- "Darth Vader" (Polish: Lord Vader), nickname given to the PKP class EN100

== See also ==
- Vater (disambiguation)
