= Daniel Clasen =

German political theorist, religious scholar, and classicist

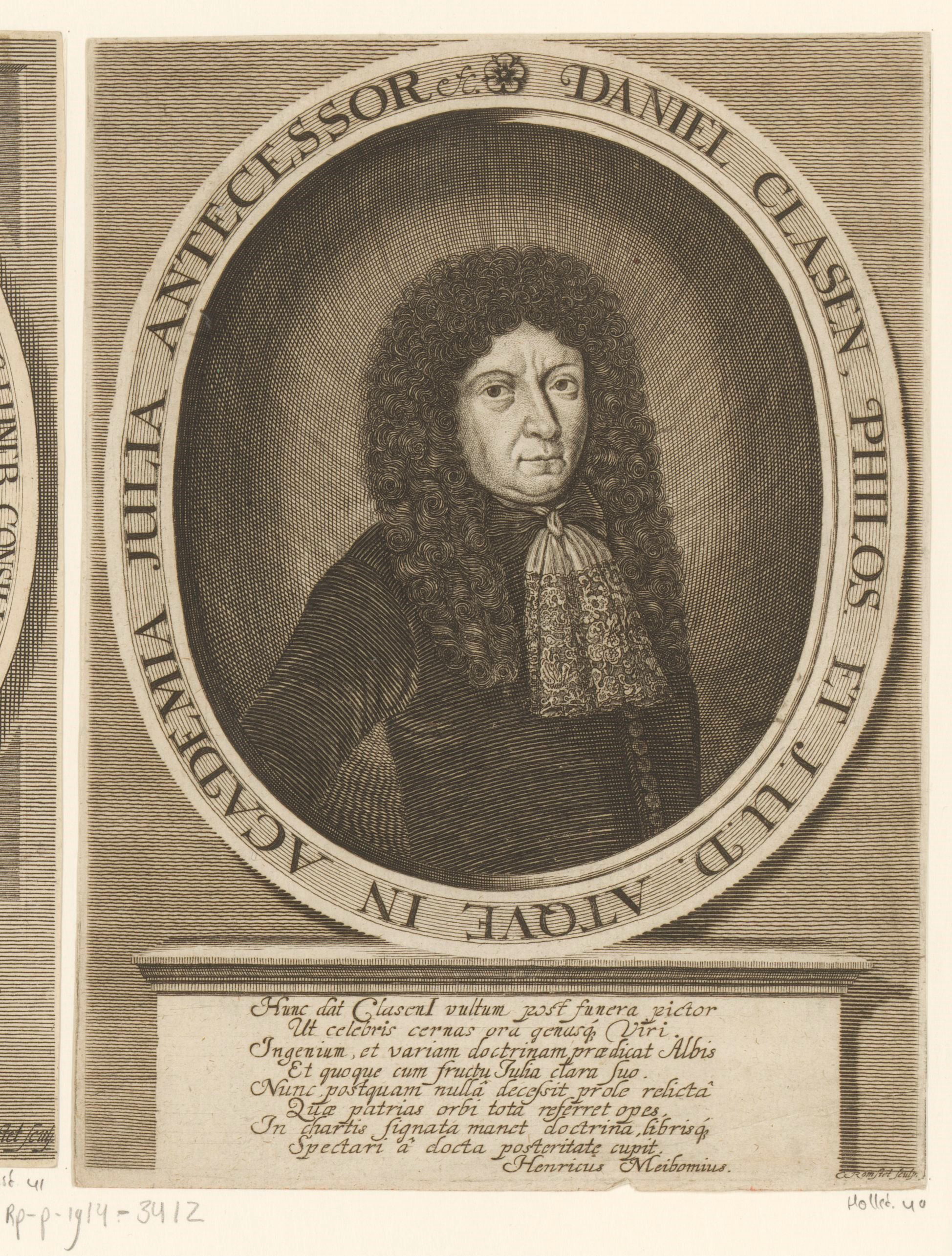
Daniel Clasen

Daniel Clasen, in Latin Danielis Clasenius or Clasenus (1 May 1622, Lüneburg – 20 November 1678, Helmstedt), was a German political theorist, religious scholar, and classicist.

His treatises, written in Latin, dealt with law, jurisprudence, religion, and politics. Clasen was one of the earliest theorists of political religion, though preceded by Tommaso Campanella (1568–1639), and argued against accommodation theory.

Clasen was a major mythographer of the 17th century, and wrote commentaries on classical texts such as the so-called Tablet of Cebes (Cebetis Tabula vitae humanae), for which he provided a Latin translation.

== Works ==
Clasen's works include:

- Commentarius in constitutiones criminales Caroli V. Imperatoris
- De religione politica
- De iure legitimationis exercitatio iuridica
- Exercitatio iuridica de patria potestate
- Politicae compendium succinctum cum notis
- De iure aggratiandi
- Theologia gentilis (vol. 7 of the series Thesaurus Graecarum antiquitatum edited by Jakob Gronovius)
- De oraculis gentilium et in specie de vaticiniis Sibyllinis
