= Antoine Vater =

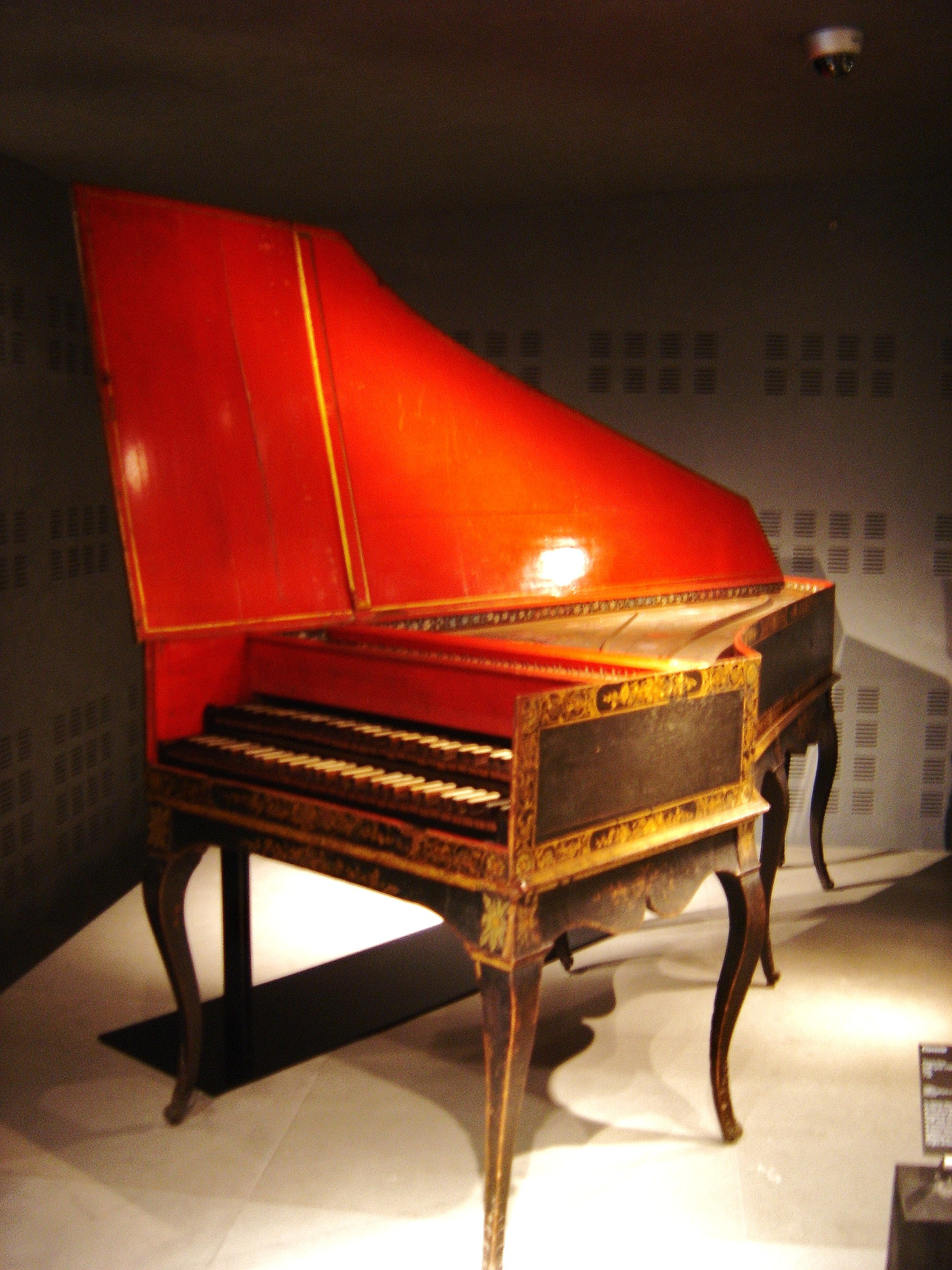
Harpsichord dated 1732, by Antoine Vater, now at the Musée de la Musique in Paris

Antoine Vater (Hanover 1689 - Paris 1759) (also known as Anton Vater, Vatters, Wathers, Water, Vatre, Watter) was a celebrated Parisian harpsichord maker of German origin.

== Biography ==
Vater was born to family of Hanoverian harpsichord and organ builders. While his older brother Christian Vater took over the family workshop, Antoine emigrated to Paris in 1715 to practice his family profession and gained a reputation as one of the finest harpsichord makers in the city, eventually becoming a Guardian of the Royal Harpsichords, charged with maintaining the large collection at Versailles. He had several apprentices, the most notable being another German émigré to Paris, Henri Hemsch.

Vater was a friend of German composer Georg Philipp Telemann who lodged with him in Paris during his 1737-38 sojourn. Vater's name and address also appears on the title page of Telemann's 1738 "Nouveaux Quatours". A notice given in the Mercure de France of July 1759 states that Vater was withdrawing from his trade, and had a number of harpsichords for sale, including some by Ruckers. A 1748 harpsichord piece by Jacques DuPhly from the Piéces de clavecin, Livre 2 titled "La de Vatre" (hardiment) is likely to be a musical portrait of Vater – the volume was dedicated to Madame Victoire who reportedly owned a Vater harpsichord from 1724. His work is also mentioned in Michel Corrette's "Le maître de clavecin" (1753).

== Surviving instruments ==
Three instruments by Vater are known to survive today: one (dated 1732) is at the Cité de la Musique in Paris, another (dated 1737) is in a private collection in England, and a third (dated 1738) is in a private collection in Ireland – the latter was used for recordings by Brigitte Tramier and Carole Cerasi. An instrument at the Ringve Museum attributed to Ant. Watters is unlikely to be by Vater.

== Recent research ==
In 2017, a research project led by Pascale Vandervellen concluded that the keyboards of the Ruckers-Taskin harpsichord of 1774 and parts of the ravalement were most probably by Vater. A public research conference on Vater and his apprentice Henri Hemsch was organised by Frédérick Haas, Royaumont, Academie musicale de Villecroze, and Musee de la Musique, Paris for November 2026. The subject is due to be discussed by harpsichord makers Émile Jobin, Philippe Humeau, Bas Neelen, and the harpsichordist-researcher Tetsu Isaji at a roundtable headed by Florence Gétreau.

== See also ==
- List of historical harpsichord makers
