= Teofil Rutka =

Polish Jesuit, philosopher and missionary (1622–1700)

- Born: 27 December 1622; Kiev Voivodeship, Crown of the Kingdom of Poland
- Died: 18 May 1700 (aged 77); Lwów, Ruthenian Voivodeship, Crown of the Kingdom of Poland
- Occupations: Jesuit; rhetorician; philosopher; theologian; missionary

Teofil (Bogusław) Rutka SJ (27 December 1622 in the Kiev Voivodeship – 18 May 1700 in Lwów) was a Polish Jesuit, rhetorician, philosopher, theologian and missionary.

== Biography ==
Born in the region of Kyiv, he received his secondary education (including a course in rhetoric and a two-year course in philosophy) at the Jesuit College in Ostroh. On 13 August 1643, he joined the Jesuit Order in Kraków and was ordained priest in Poznań in 1652. He was a professor of rhetorics, philosophy, polemical theology and moral theology in many Jesuit schools in Poland (in 1656–57 also in Bohemian Głogów). He served as a professor in the years 1653–76, with short breaks for being a court missionary (1657–58, probably for the Inowrocław voievode Krzysztof Żegocki), a missionary to the Crimean Khanate (1661), a poenitentiarius in Loreto (1663–64), and a missionary to Constantinople (1672–73). In the years 1676–1700 he served as a court missionary for the Ruthenian voievode Stanisław Jan Jabłonowski.

Rutka wrote in Latin, but he has also published translations of his works into Polish. He is renowned mainly for his works on rhetorics, primarily for his tractatus Rhetor polonus. He was a very prolific writer, beside of the rhetorics, an author of many polemical and ascetical works. Rutka was deeply interested in the problem of the relations between Eastern and Western Christianity, which was very vivid in the 17th century Poland, especially among the Jesuits. He wrote many books on the problem, especially on the filioque question. He has also acted for conversion of the Muslims, writing some books on the subject and trying to promote the idea of a league against the Ottoman Empire to be organized by the Christian monarchs.

== Bibliography ==
- Ludwik Grzebień SJ, Encyklopedia wiedzy o jezuitach na ziemiach Polski i Litwy, 1564-1995, Kraków 1996
- Ludwik Grzebień SJ, Teofil Rutka, in: Polski Słownik Biograficzny, vol. XXXIII, 1991
