= Henri Hemsch =

Harpsichord maker

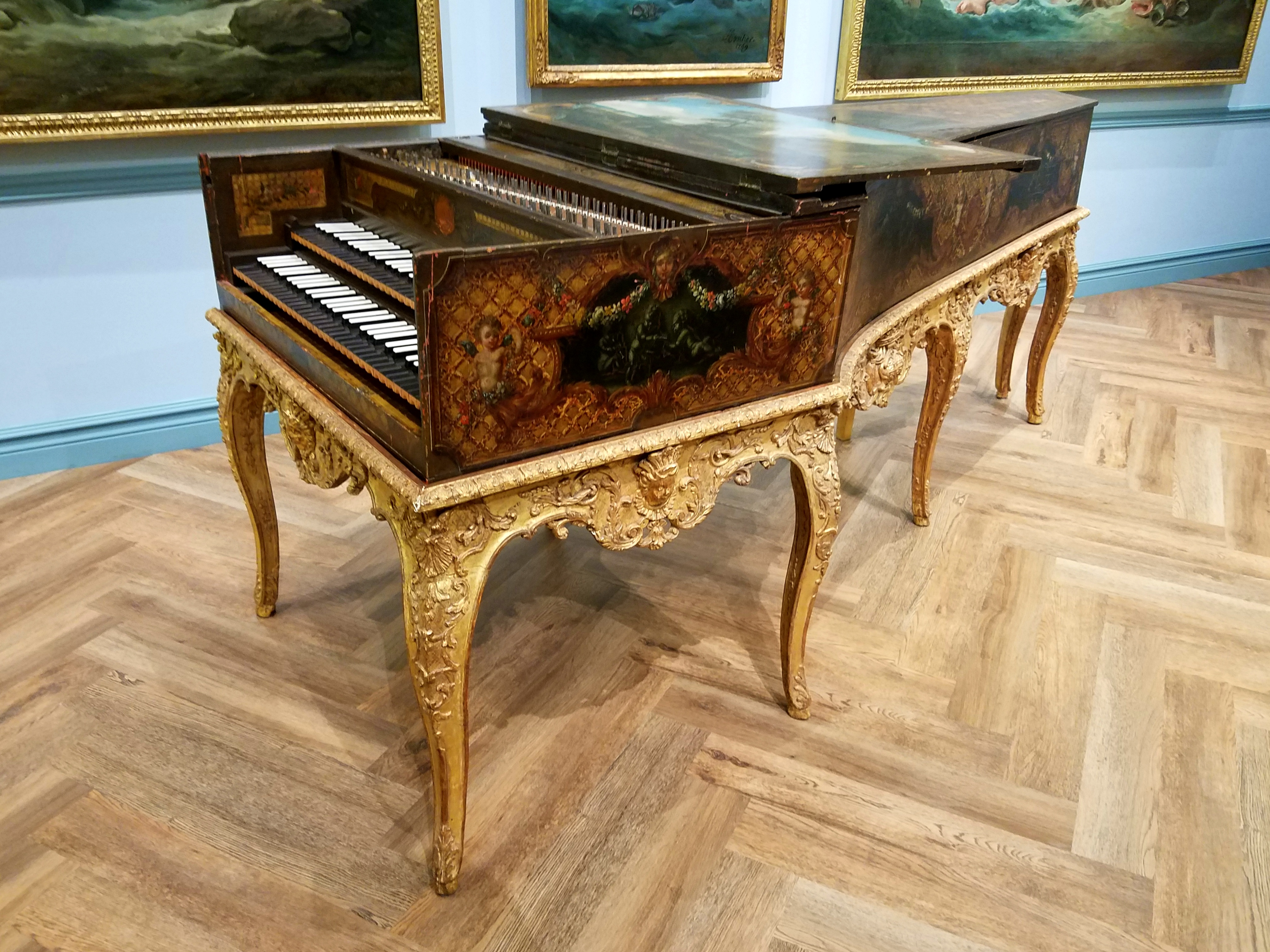
Harpsichord by Hemsch, probably 1736, in the Museum of Fine Arts, Boston

Jean-Henri Hemsch (21 February 1700 – September 1769), known in German as Johann Heinrich Hemsch (alternate spelling: Johannes Heinrich Hembsch), was a French harpsichord maker of German origin.

== Biography ==
Hemsch was born in Kastenholtz, near Cologne, and moved to France in 1728 where he completed a six-year apprenticeship under Antoine Vater, another German émigré harpsichord maker. Following this, he established his own workshop in Rue Quincampoix, Paris with his younger brother Guillaume (1734–1776), and served a two-year term as juré of the instrument makers' guild from 1746.

Hemsch died in Paris and was succeeded by his nephew Jean-Henri Moers (1754–1793). He is celebrated as one of the most important harpsichord builders of his milieu.

Six of his double-manual harpsichords have survived:

· a lavishly decorated instrument in brown and gold from 1736 (Museum of Fine Arts, Boston)

· a white instrument with a lid painting and gilding from 1751 (currently owned by the harpsichordist Frédérick Haas)

· a black and red instrument with gold bands from 1754 (Bayerisches Nationalmuseum)

· a green and red instrument with subtle gilding from 1755/6 (currently owned by the musicologist Claude Noisette de Crauzat)

· a black and red instrument with a blank lid from 1761 (Cité de la Musique, Paris)

· a lavishly decorated ravalement double-manual harpsichord from 1763 based on a 1636 Andrea Ruckers harpsichord (Cobbe Collection, Hatchlands Park)

His harpsichords are similar to those of Vater and French in style, with two manuals, three-register disposition with shove coupler, and a compass of FF–e''' (rising to f''' on the 1761 and the 1763 ravalement).

== Guillaume Hemsch ==
Three further instruments bearing the Hemsch name have survived, all of which were completed by Guillaume:

· a double-manual harpsichord from 1763 (current location unknown)

· a fake "1636" Ruckers from 1766, the soundboard of which was probably built from a seventeenth-century Flemish muselaar (current location unknown)

· an undated fake "1628" Ruckers (current location unknown)

== See also ==
- List of historical harpsichord makers
