= 1618 =

1618 in various calendars
- Gregorian calendar: 1618; MDCXVIII
- Ab urbe condita: 2371
- Armenian calendar: 1067; ԹՎ ՌԿԷ
- Assyrian calendar: 6368
- Balinese saka calendar: 1539–1540
- Bengali calendar: 1024–1025
- Berber calendar: 2568
- English Regnal year: 15 Ja. 1 – 16 Ja. 1
- Buddhist calendar: 2162
- Burmese calendar: 980
- Byzantine calendar: 7126–7127
- Chinese calendar: 丁巳年 (Fire Snake); 4315 or 4108 — to — 戊午年 (Earth Horse); 4316 or 4109
- Coptic calendar: 1334–1335
- Discordian calendar: 2784
- Ethiopian calendar: 1610–1611
- Hebrew calendar: 5378–5379
- Hindu calendars
- Vikram Samvat: 1674–1675
- Shaka Samvat: 1539–1540
- Kali Yuga: 4718–4719
- Holocene calendar: 11618
- Igbo calendar: 618–619
- Iranian calendar: 996–997
- Islamic calendar: 1027–1028
- Japanese calendar: Genna 4 (元和４年)
- Javanese calendar: 1538–1539
- Julian calendar: Gregorian minus 10 days
- Korean calendar: 3951
- Minguo calendar: 294 before ROC 民前294年
- Nanakshahi calendar: 150
- Thai solar calendar: 2160–2161
- Tibetan calendar: མེ་མོ་སྦྲུལ་ལོ་ (female Fire-Snake); 1744 or 1363 or 591 — to — ས་ཕོ་རྟ་ལོ་ (male Earth-Horse); 1745 or 1364 or 592

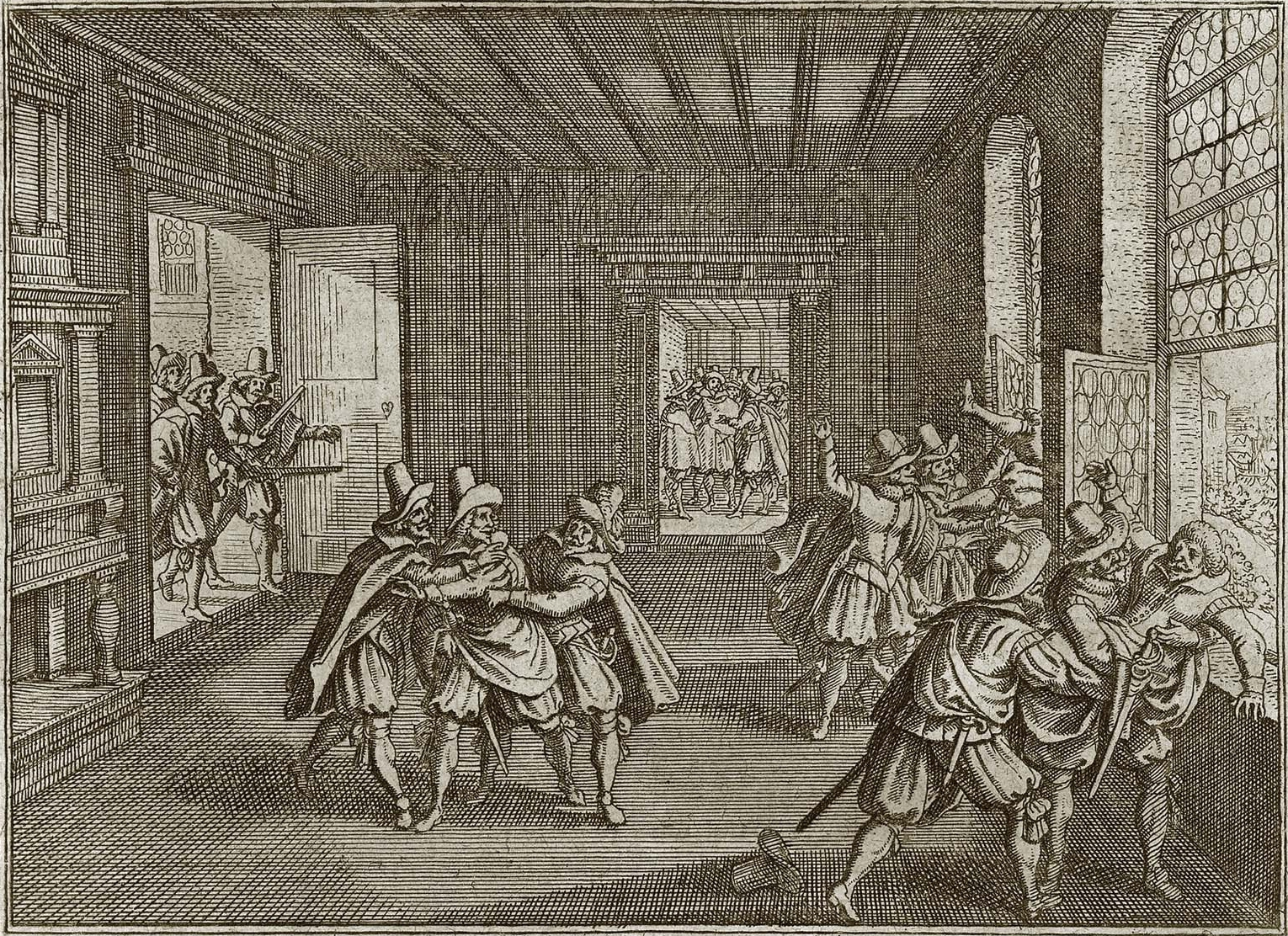
May 23: The Second Defenestration of Prague takes place

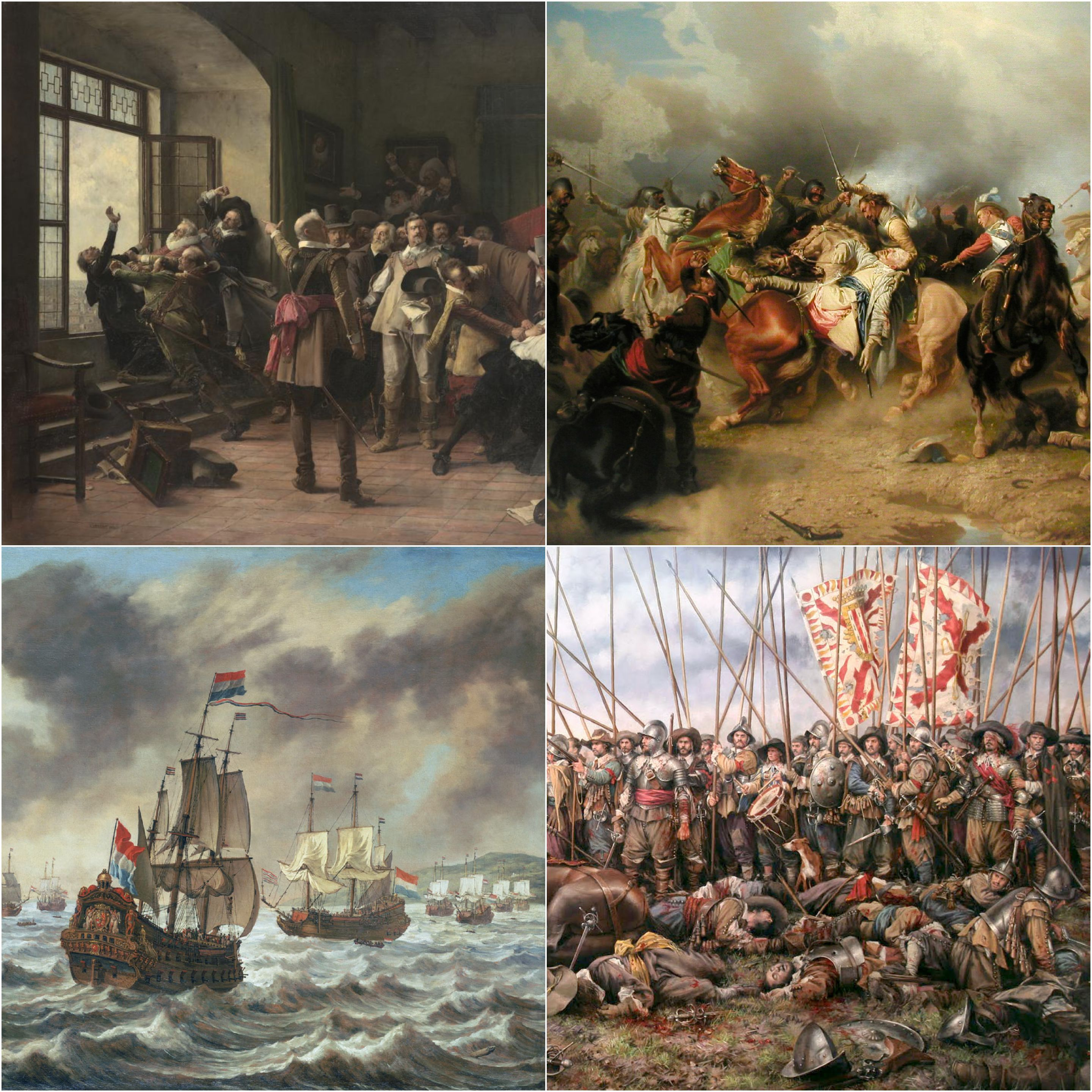
The Thirty Years' War begins.

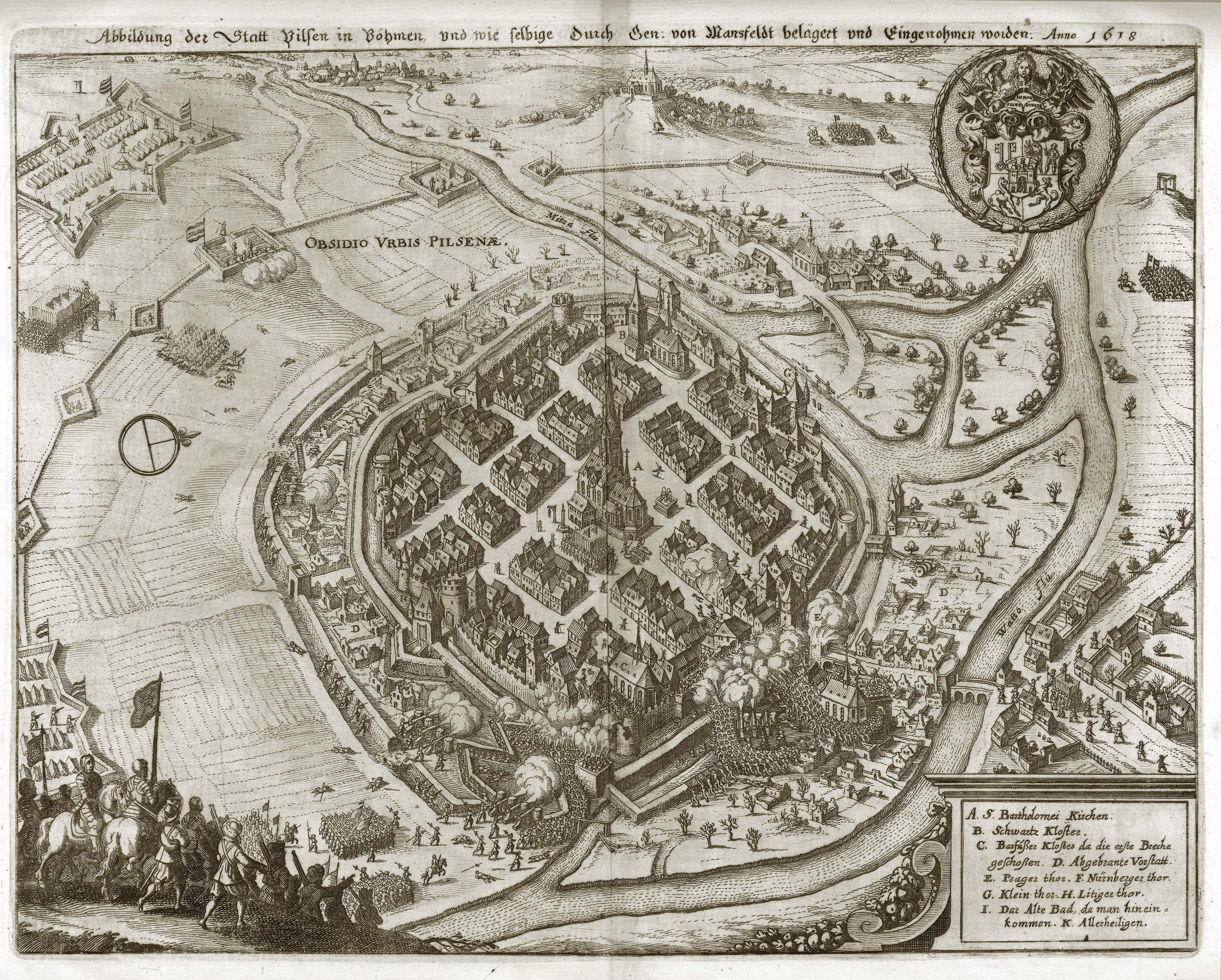
September 19–November 21: Siege of Pilsen

1618 (MDCXVIII) was a common year starting on Monday of the Gregorian calendar and a common year starting on Thursday of the Julian calendar, the 1618th year of the Common Era (CE) and Anno Domini (AD) designations, the 618th year of the 2nd millennium, the 18th year of the 17th century, and the 9th year of the 1610s decade. As of the start of 1618, the Gregorian calendar was 10 days ahead of the Julian calendar, which remained in localized use until 1923.

== Events ==
=== January–March ===
- January 6
  - Jahangir, ruler of the Mughal Empire in northern India, gives an audience for the first time to a representative of the British East India Company, receiving Sir Thomas Roe at the capital at Ahmedabad.
  - Ben Jonson's play Pleasure Reconciled to Virtue is given its premiere performance, presented at the Palace of Whitehall in London.
- January 28 – Rules are established for the Ōoku, the section of Edo Castle that housed the Shōgun's consort and his concubines.
- February 18 – Chŏng Inhong becomes the new Chief State Councillor (the Yŏngŭijŏng, similar to a Prime Minister) of the Joseon Kingdom, after being appointed by Gwanghaegun of Joseon.
- February 26 – Osman II deposes his uncle Mustafa I as Ottoman sultan (until 1622).
- March 8 – Johannes Kepler discovers the third law of planetary motion (after some initial calculations, he soon rejects the idea, but on May 15 confirms the discovery).

=== April–June ===
- April 21 – Spanish-born Jesuit missionary Pedro Páez becomes (probably) the first European to see and describe the source of the Blue Nile in Ethiopia.
- May 23 – The Second Defenestration of Prague – Protestant noblemen hold a mock trial, and throw two direct representatives of Ferdinand II of Germany (Imperial Governors) and their scribe out of a window into a pile of manure, exacerbating a low-key rebellion into the Bohemian Revolt (1618–1621), precipitating the Thirty Years' War into armed conflict, and further polarizing Europe on religious grounds.
- June 14 – Joris Veseler prints the first Dutch newspaper Courante uyt Italien, Duytslandt, &c. in Amsterdam (approximate date).

=== July–September ===
- July 1 – Ferdinand II, a proponent of the Counter-Reformation, is crowned as King of Hungary at a meeting of the Bohemian diet at Pressburg.
- July 3 – Alonso Fajardo de Entenza becomes the new Spanish Governor-General of the Philippines.
- July 20 – Pluto reaches its second most recent aphelion, according to sophisticated mathematical calculations. The next one occurs in 1866, and the following one will occur in 2113.
- July 31 – Lenaert Jacobszoon and the crew of the Dutch East India Company ship Mauritius become the first Europeans to sight what is now the Australian state of Western Australia, landing at the North Cape.
- August 29 – Johan van Oldenbarnevelt and Hugo Grotius are imprisoned by Maurice, Prince of Orange.
- September 4 – Rodi avalanche: A rock- or snowslide buries the Alpine town of Piuro, claiming 2,427 victims.
- September 18 – Beginning of the 13th Baktun, in the Mesoamerican Long Count calendar (12.0.0.0.0).
- September 19 – The Siege of Pilsen begins as the first major battle of the Thirty Years' War, as Bohemian Protestants lay siege to the Bohemian Catholic city and lasts for more than two months.
- September 28 – The Battle of Orynin takes place. Polish and Lithuanian Army forces fail to stop an invasion by the forces of the Crimean Khanate, who then proceed in burning villages in Lithuania and enslaving residents.

=== October–December ===
- October 9 – Residents of Mogilev revolt against Uniate bishop Josaphat Kuntsevych.
- October 29 – English adventurer, writer and courtier Sir Walter Raleigh is beheaded at the Palace of Westminster, for allegedly conspiring treasonably against James I of England in 1603, following pressure from the Spanish government, over his attack on their settlement on the Orinoco, on his last (1617–18) voyage.
- November 13 – The Synod of Dort has its first meeting.
- November 21 – Pilsen falls to Bohemian Protestants led by Ernst von Mansfeld after more than two months of deprivation of food.
- December 11 – Russia and Poland sign the Truce of Deulino.

=== Date unknown ===
- The margraves of Brandenburg are granted Polish approval to inherit the Duchy of Prussia, creating the state of Brandenburg-Prussia.
- The 3,000 seat Teatro Farnese, the first permanent proscenium theatre, is built into the Great Hall of the Palazzo della Pilotta in Parma, Italy.
- The Ming Chinese embassy of the Wanli Emperor presents tea to the Russian tsar.

== Births ==
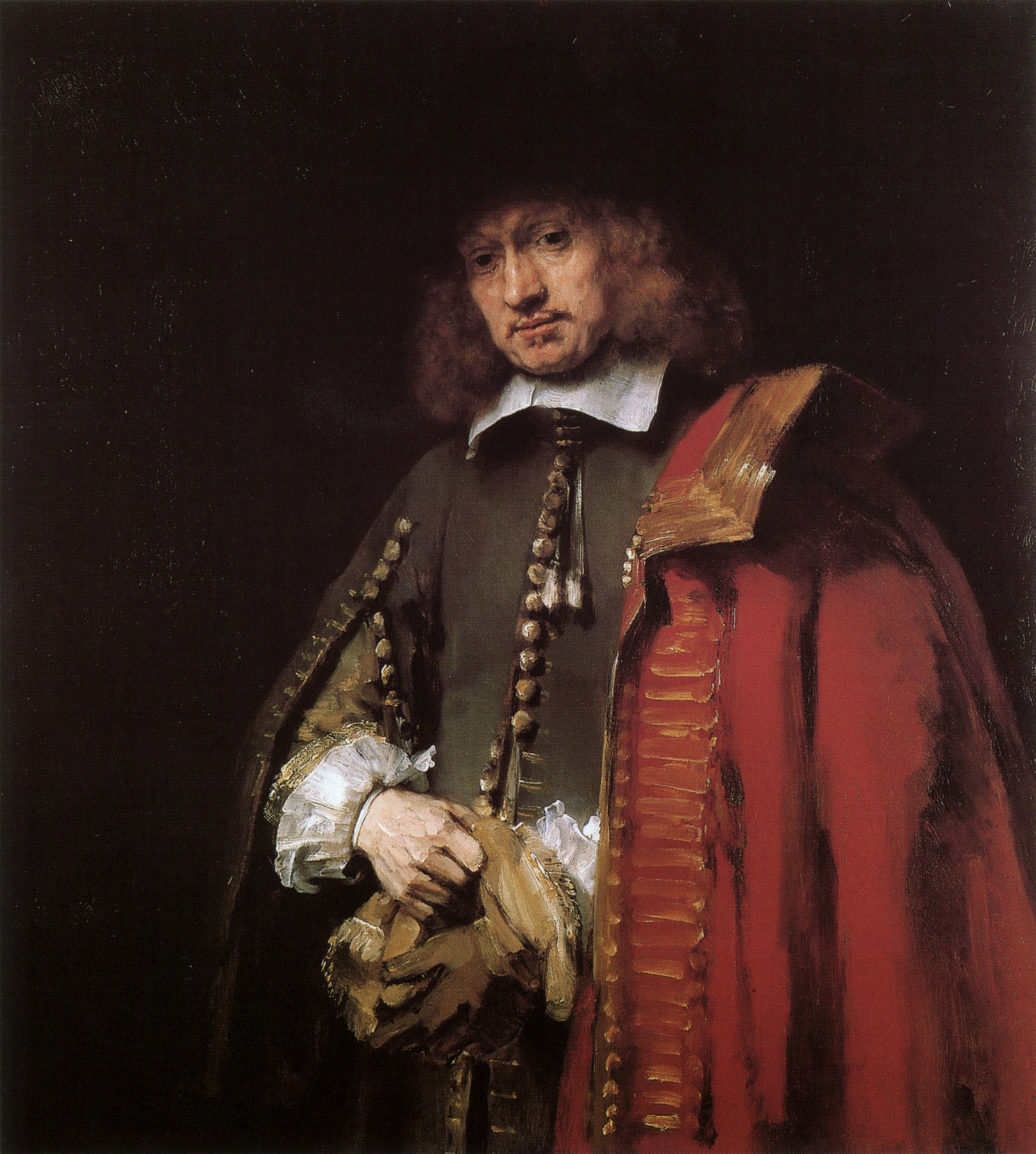
Jan Six

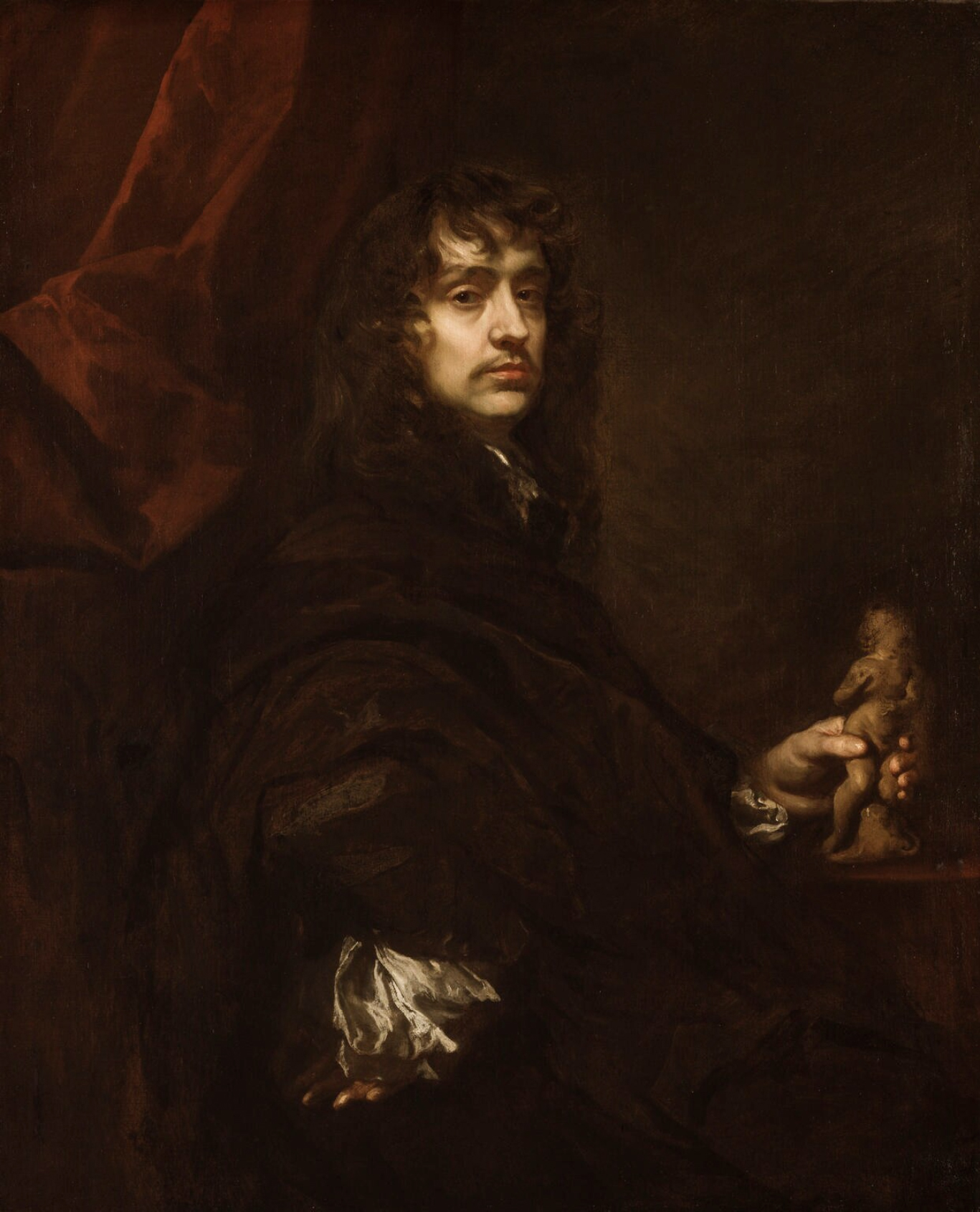
Sir Peter Lely

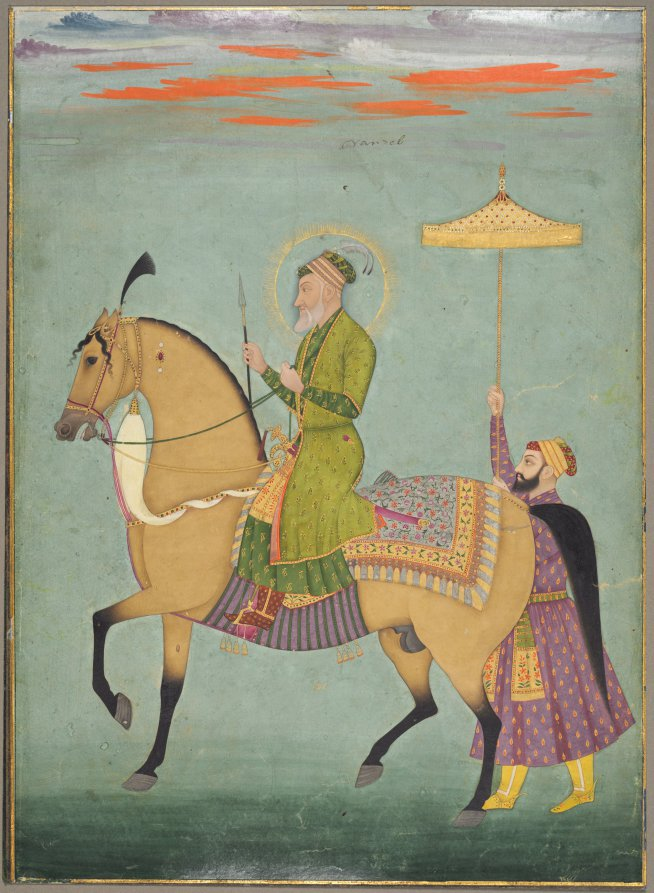
Aurangzeb

=== January–March ===
- January 1 (bapt.) – Bartolomé Esteban Murillo, Spanish painter (d. 1682)
- January 2 – Jean Hamon, French doctor and writer (d. 1687)
- January 3 – Jean Crasset, French Jesuit theologian (d. 1692)
- January 8 – Madeleine Béjart, French actress and theatre director (d. 1672)
- January 14 – Jan Six, important cultural figure in the Dutch Golden Age (d. 1700)
- January 25 – Nicolaes Visscher I, Dutch engraver, cartographer and publisher (d. 1679)
- January 28 – James Ley, 3rd Earl of Marlborough, English nobleman, sailor, and mathematician (d. 1665)
- January 29 – Jean Paul Médaille, French Jesuit missionary (d. 1689)
- February 12 – Olaus Verelius, scholar of Old Norse and Scandinavian studies (d. 1682)
- February 17 – Matthias Abele, Austrian jurist, mine official (d. 1677)
- February 19 – Johannes Phocylides Holwarda, Dutch astronomer (d. 1651)
- March 4 – George Louis, Prince of Nassau-Dillenburg, German noble (d. 1656)
- March 14 – Nadira Banu Begum, Mughal princess (d. 1659)
- March 19 – Thomas Hinckley, last colonial governor of Plymouth Colony (d. 1706)

=== April–June ===
- April 2 – Francesco Maria Grimaldi, Italian mathematician and physicist (d. 1663)
- April 4 – Ferrante III Gonzaga, Duke of Guastalla, Italian noble (d. 1678)
- April 9 – Christian, Duke of Brieg, Duke of Legnica (1663–1672) and Brieg (1664–1672) (d. 1672)
- April 13 – Roger de Rabutin, Comte de Bussy, French writer (d. 1693)
- April 14 – Thomas Moore, English politician (d. 1695)
- April 29 – Vittoria Farnese d'Este, Duchess of Modena and Reggio (d. 1649)
- May 22 – Henrik Horn, Swedish military leader and noble (d. 1693)
- June 1 – Johann Franck, German poet and hymnist (d. 1677)
- June 15
  - François Blondel, French architect (d. 1686)
  - Ippolito Lante Montefeltro della Rovere, Italian nobleman and Duke of Bomarzo (d. 1688)
- June 24 – Philip Packer, British barrister and architect (d. 1686)
- June 28 – Jean Le Pautre, French designer and engraver (d. 1682)

=== July–September ===
- July 6 – Alexander Lindsay, 1st Earl of Balcarres, Scottish politician and noble (d. 1659)
- July 17
  - Willem Ogier, Flemish playwright (d. 1689)
  - George Stewart, 9th Seigneur d'Aubigny, Scottish nobleman and military commander (d. 1642)
- July 21 – Hayashi Gahō, Japanese philosopher (d. 1688)
- July 22 – Johan Nieuhof, Dutch traveler who wrote about his journeys to Brazil (d. 1672)
- September 6 – Walter Hoyt, Connecticut settler (d. 1698)
- September 9 – Joan Cererols, Catalan musician and Benedictine monk (d. 1680)
- September 11 – Francesco Grue, Italian artist (d. 1673)
- September 14 – Peter Lely, Dutch painter (d. 1680)
- September 27 – Jacob Alting, Dutch linguist (d. 1679)
- September 29 – Michiel Sweerts, Flemish painter (d. 1664)

=== October–December ===
- October 8 – Claude Lamoral, 3rd Prince of Ligne, Spanish general and prince (d. 1679)
- October 7 – Rosina Schnorr, German businessperson (d. 1679)
- October 31 – Mariana de Jesús de Paredes, Catholic saint, the first person to be canonized from Ecuador (d. 1645)
- November – Simon Arnauld, Marquis de Pomponne, French diplomat and minister of Louis XIV (d. 1699)
- November 1 – Sir John Wittewrong, 1st Baronet, English parliamentarian (d. 1693)
- November 3 – Aurangzeb, Mughal emperor of India (d. 1707)
- November 8 – Louise de La Fayette, French courtier, friend of King Louis XIII (d. 1665)
- November 12 – Gottfried Welsch, German physician (d. 1690)
- November 16 – Johann Ludwig Schönleben, Carniolan priest (d. 1681)
- November 26 – Johan Frederik von Marschalck, German-born landowner, Chancellor of Norway (d. 1679)
- December 2
  - Edward Bayntun, English politician (d. 1679)
  - Nicholas Delves, English politician (d. 1690)
- December 3 – Sir William Ayloffe, 3rd Baronet, officer in the Royalist army during the English Civil War (d. 1662)
- December 18 – Karl Kaspar von der Leyen, German Catholic archbishop (d. 1676)
- December 26 – Elisabeth of the Palatinate, German princess, philosopher, and Calvinist (d. 1680)
- December 28 – Catharina Hooft, noblewoman of the Dutch Golden Age (d. 1691)

=== Date unknown ===
- Athittayawong, Ayutthayan monarch (d. 1629)
- Henry Bennet, 1st Earl of Arlington, English politician (member of the Cabal) d. 1685)

== Deaths ==
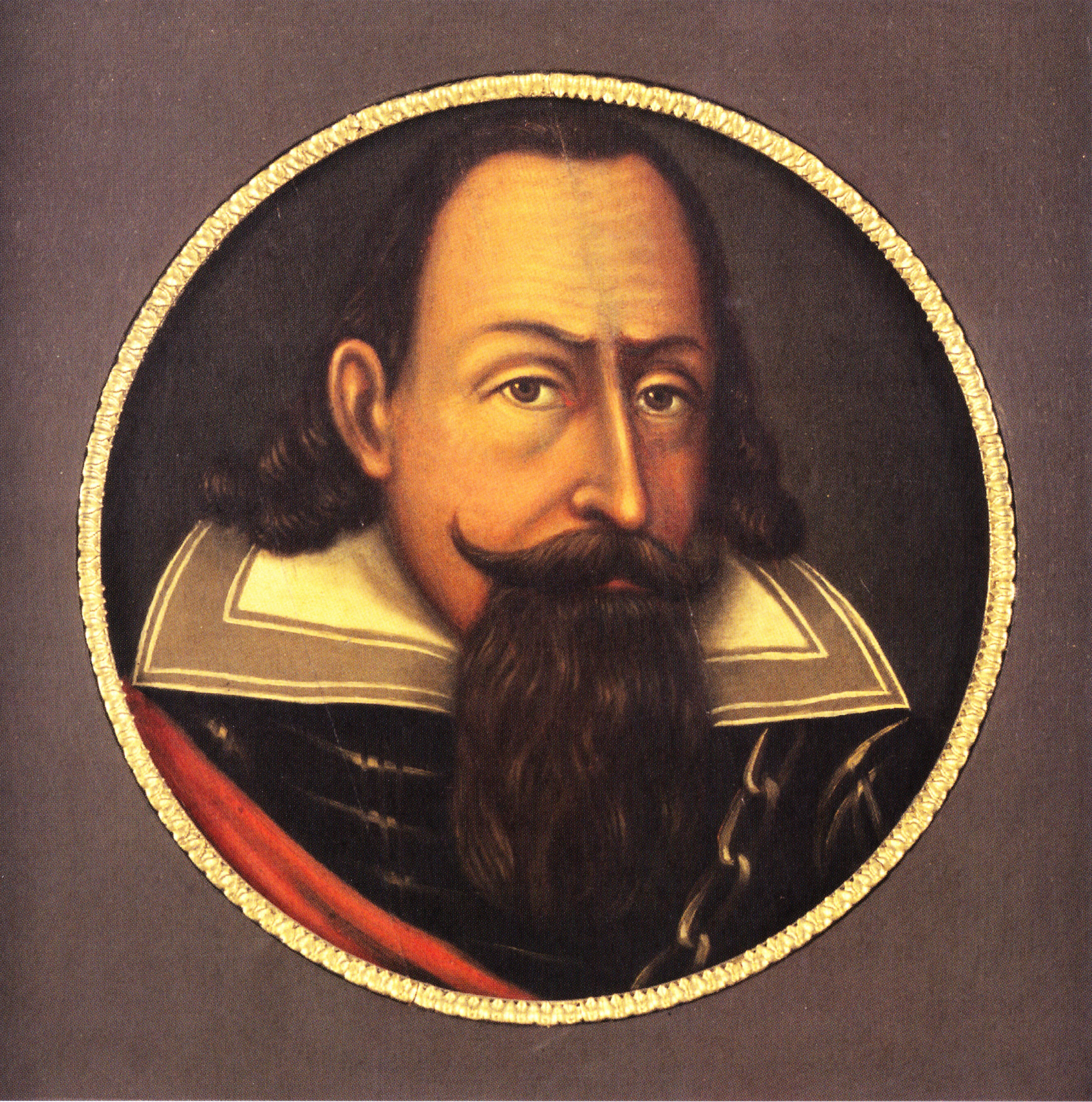
Philip II, Duke of Pomerania

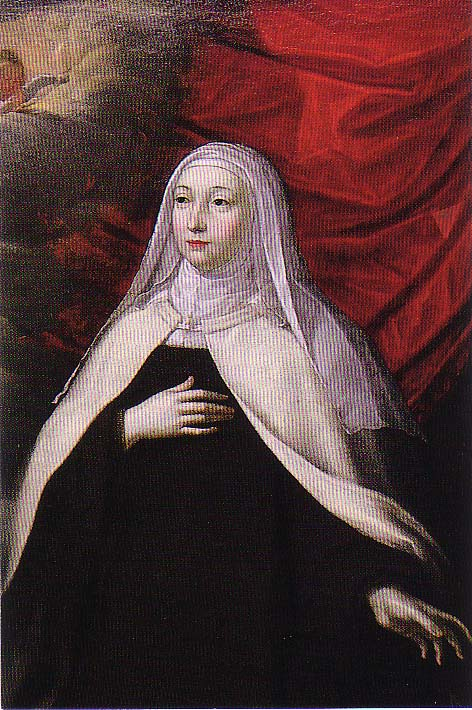
Marie of the Incarnation (Carmelite)

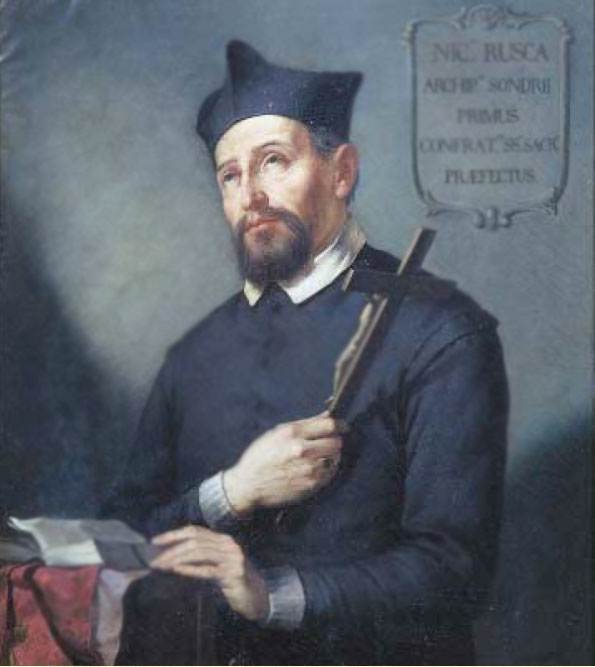
Nicolò Rusca

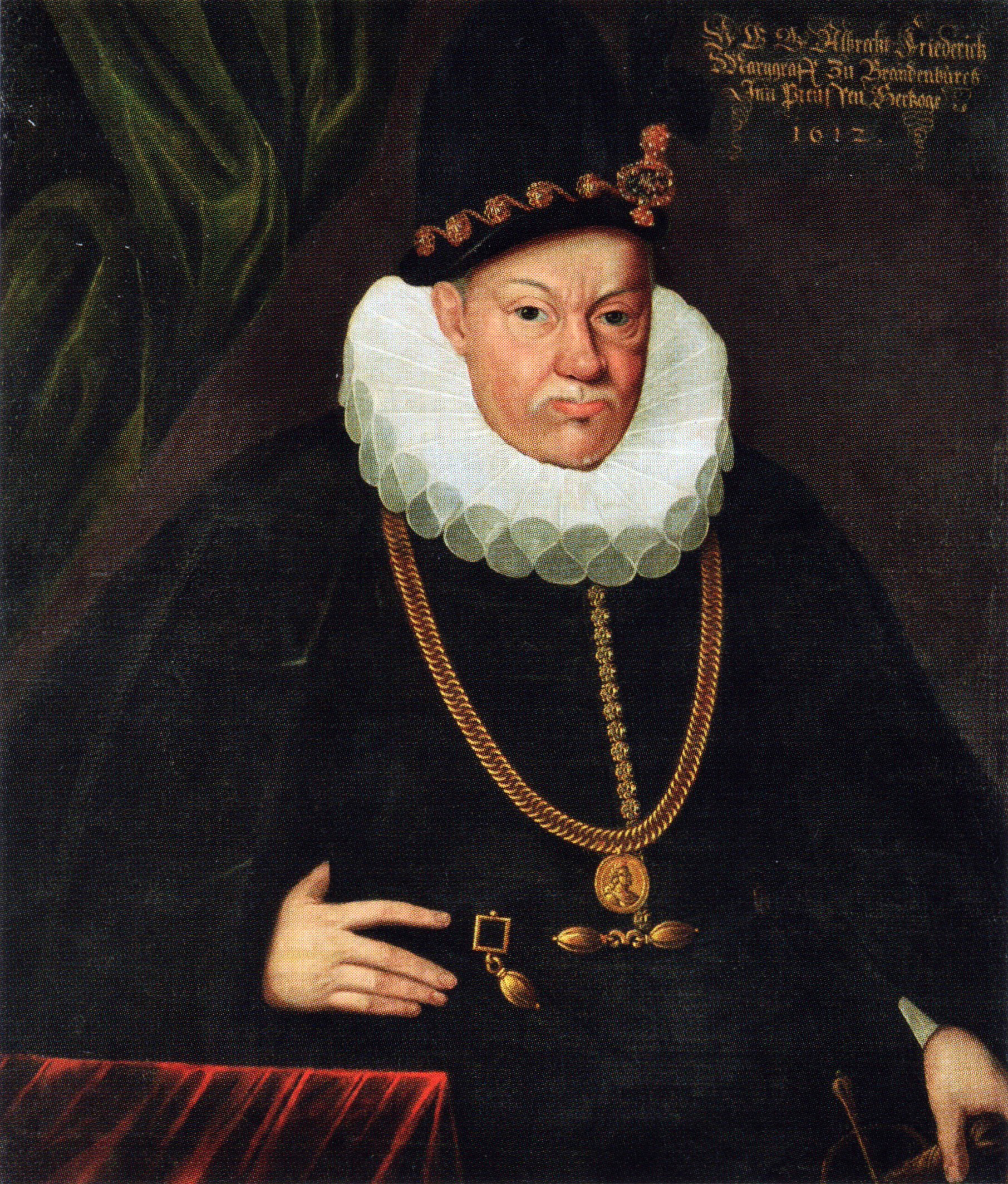
Albert Frederick, Duke of Prussia

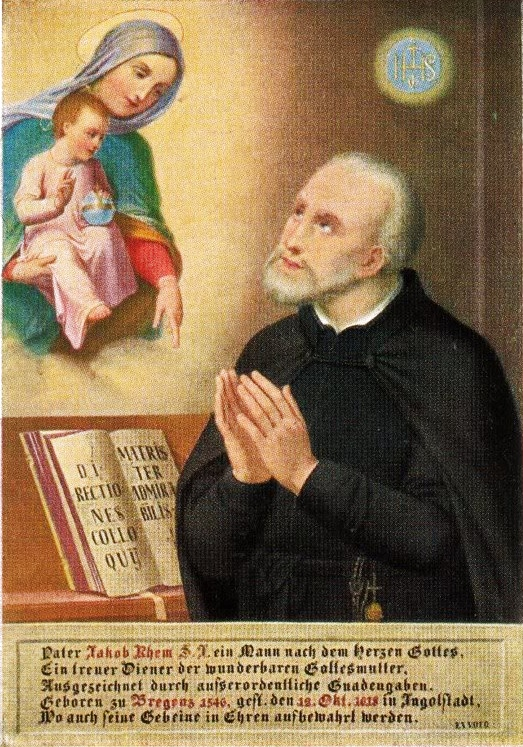
Jakob Rem

=== January–March ===
- January 6 – Margherita Gonzaga, Duchess of Ferrara (b. 1564)
- January 19 – Jacobus Zaffius, Dutch Catholic provost (b. 1535)
- January 24 – Henry Brooke, 11th Baron Cobham, English peer and traitor (b. 1564)
- January 29 – John Dackombe, Chancellor of the Duchy of Lancaster (b. 1570)
- February 3 – Philip II, Duke of Pomerania-Stettin (b. 1573)
- February 10 – Feliks Kryski, Grand Chancellor of Poland (b. 1562)
- February 14 – Paolo Emilio Sfondrati, Italian Catholic cardinal (b. 1560)
- February 20 – Philip William, Prince of Orange, eldest son of William the Silent, by his first wife Anna van Egmont (b. 1554)
- February 25 – Elizabeth Spencer, Baroness Hunsdon, English baroness (b. 1552)
- February 27 – Anne Lyon, Countess of Kinghorne, Scottish countess (b. 1579)
- March 5
  - John, Duke of Östergötland (b. 1589)
  - Countess Palatine Barbara of Zweibrücken-Neuburg and by marriage Countess of Oettingen-Oettingen (b. 1559)
- March 16 – Giovanni Bembo, Doge of Venice (b. 1543)
- March 23 – James Hamilton, 1st Earl of Abercorn, Scottish politician (b. c. 1575)
- March 26 – Frederick Magnus, Count of Erbach-Fürstenau (1606–1618) (b. 1575)
- March 31 – Pedro Cornejo de Pedrosa, Spanish theologian (b. 1536)

=== April–June ===
- April – Powhatan (proper name Wahunsenacawh), Algonquin (indigenous American) leader, father of Pocahontas (b. c. 1547)
- April 5 – Robert Barker, English politician (b. 1563)
- April 14 – Giovanni Battista Zuccato, Italian Catholic prelate, Bishop of Nusco (1607–1614) (b. 1543)
- April 18 – Marie of the Incarnation, Carmelite (b. 1566)
- May 9 – Nicolò Donato, Doge of Venice (b. 1539)
- May 24 – John George I, Prince of Anhalt-Dessau (1603–1618) (b. 1567)
- May 31 – Sabina Catharina of East Frisia, Countess of Rietberg (1586–1618) (b. 1582)
- June 7 – Thomas West, 3rd Baron De La Warr, English Governor of Virginia (b. 1577)
- June 21 – Kasper Hassler, German musician (b. 1562)

=== July–September ===
- July 20 – James Montague, British bishop (b. 1568)
- July 24 – Nicolò Rusca, Italian priest who served in Como (b. 1563)
- July 26 – Martinus Smiglecius, Polish philosopher (b. 1564)
- August 7 – Princess Maria Elizabeth of Sweden, Swedish princess (b. 1596)
- August 23 – Gerbrand Adriaenszoon Bredero, Dutch writer (b. 1585)
- August 28 – Albert Frederick, Duke of Prussia (b. 1553)
- September 3 – Frederik van den Bergh, Dutch soldier in the Eighty Years' War (b. 1559)
- September 28 – Joshua Sylvester, English poet (b. 1563)

=== October–December ===
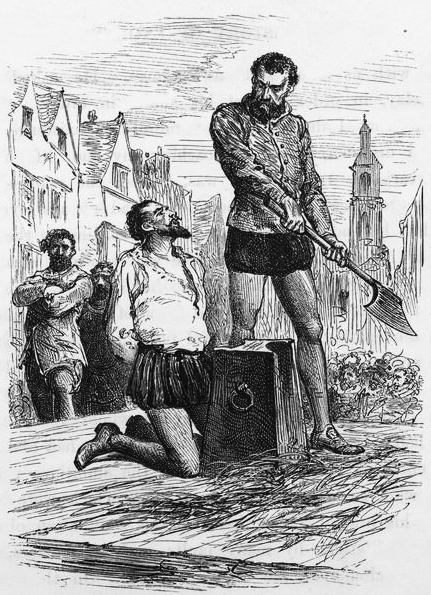
Sir Walter Raleigh

- October 12 – Jakob Rem, Austrian Jesuit (b. 1546)
- October 24 – Elisabeth of Brunswick-Wolfenbüttel, German noblewoman (b. 1567)
- October 29 – Sir Walter Raleigh, English soldier, politician, courtier, explorer, Virginia settler, historian, poet and spy (executed) (b. 1552 of 1554)
- October 30
  - Charles, Margrave of Burgau, German nobleman (b. 1560)
  - Prospero Farinacci, Italian jurist (b. 1554)
- November 2 – Maximilian III, Archduke of Austria (b. 1558)
- November 14 – Anna Maria of Brandenburg, Duchess Consort of Pomerania (b. 1567)
- December 6 – Jacques Davy Duperron, French cardinal (b. 1556)
- December 7 – Bernardo de Sandoval y Rojas, Spanish Catholic cardinal, Grand Inquisitor (b. 1546)
- December 9 – Valentine Knightley, English politician (b. 1555)
- December 10 – Giulio Caccini, Italian composer (b. 1551)
- December 14 – Anna of Tyrol, Holy Roman Empress (b. 1585)
- December 17 – Roger Puleston, Welsh politician (b. 1565)

=== Date unknown ===
- Ebba Bielke, Swedish baroness and conspirator (b. 1570)
- Christina Rauscher, German official and critic of witchcraft persecutions (b. 1570)
