= Razin (surname) =

Razin is a surname. Notable people with the surname include:

- Aharon Razin (1935–2019), Israeli biochemist
- Albert Razin (1940–2019), Udmurt language rights activist and Neopaganist who committed self-immolation
- Andrey Razin (disambiguation), multiple people
- Stenka Razin (Stepan Timofeyevich Razin, 1630–1671), Cossack leader

== See also ==
- Razin (disambiguation)
- Rasin (surname)
- Stenka Razin (disambiguation)
