= Rosina =

Rosina may refer to:

- Rosina, Slovakia, a municipality in Slovakia
- Rosina, Bulgaria, a village in Targovishte Municipality
- Rosina, West Virginia
- Rosina (given name), feminine given name
- Rosina (surname)
- Rosina (ship), list of ships with this name
- Rosina (opera), a light opera by the English composer William Shield
- 985 Rosina, minor asteroid

== See also ==
- Rosine (disambiguation)
