= Rasin (disambiguation) =

Rasin is a Haitian musical style.

Rasin or Rašín may also refer to:

- Rašín, a municipality and village in the Czech Republic
- Rašín (film), a 2018 Czech film
- Rasin (surname), a surname
- Alois Rašín, Czech politician and economist

== See also ==
- Raisin (disambiguation)
- Razin (disambiguation)
- Resin (disambiguation)
