= Rosin (disambiguation) =

Rosin is a solid form of resin obtained from pines and some other plants.

Rosin may also refer to:

- Rosin (surname)
- Rosin, Poland, a village
- Rosin (chemical), a glycoside ester

== See also ==
- Mühl Rosin, a municipality in Germany
- Rosine (disambiguation)
- Roisin (disambiguation)
- Resin (disambiguation)
