= Rosina (given name) =

- Gender: feminine

Other names
- Related names: Rose, Rosine

Rosina is a given name.

== Notable people with this name ==
- Rosina Acheampong, Ghanaian educationist
- Rosina Regina Ahles (1799–1854), German actress
- Rosina Amenebede (born 1985), Ghanaian athlete
- Rosina Anselmi (1880–1965), Italian actress
- Rosina Bierbaum (born 1952), American academic
- Rosina Cox Boardman (1878–1970), American painter
- Rosina Brandram (1845–1907), English opera singer and actress
- Rosina Buckman (1881–1948), New Zealand soprano
- Rosina Bulwer Lytton (1802–1882), English writer
- Rosina Cazali (born 1960), Guatemalan art critic
- Rosina Conde (born 1954), Mexican narrator, playwright and poet
- Rosina Dafter (1875–1959), Australian astronomer
- Rosina Davies (1863–1949), Welsh evangelist
- Rosina Edmunds (1900–1956), Australian architect
- Rosina Fernhoff (born 1931), American actress
- Rosina Ferrara (1861–1934), Italian artists' model
- Rosina Ferrario (1888–1959), Italian pilot
- Rosina Galli (dancer) (1892–1940), Italian-American ballet dancer
- Rosina Galli (actress) (1906–1969), Italian-American film actress
- Anna Rosina Gambold (1762–1821), American Moravian missionary and diarist
- Anna Rosina de Gasc (1713–1783), German portrait painter
- Maria Rosina Giberne (1802−1885), French-English artist
- Rosina von Graben von Rain (died 1534), Austrian noblewoman
- Sara Rosina Gramática (born 1942), Argentine architect
- Rosina Mantovani Gutti (1851–1943), Italian painter
- Rosina Harrison (1899–1989), lady-in-waiting to Lady Astor
- Rosina Heikel (1842–1929), Finnish medical doctor and feminist
- Rosina Henley (1890–1978), American actress and screenwriter
- Rosina ǁHoabes, Namibian politician
- Rosina Hodde (born 1983), Dutch hurdler
- Cornelia Rosina Jones (1907–1979), Dutch politician from Saba
- Rosina Komane, South African politician
- Rosina Lam (born 1987), Hong Kong actress
- Rosina Lawrence (1912–1997), Canadian-born American actress, singer, and dancer
- Rosina Lhévinne (1880–1976), Russian American pianist
- Rosina Lippi (born 1956), American writer
- Rosina Palmer (1844–1932), Australian opera singer
- Rosina Penco (1823–1894), Italian operatic soprano
- Rosina Raisbeck (1916–2006), Australian opera and concert mezzo-soprano singer
- Rosina Randafiarison (born 1999), Malagasy weightlifter
- Rosina Schneeberger (born 1994), Austrian skier
- Rosina Schnorr (1618–1679), German businessperson
- Althea Rosina Sherman (1853–1943), American illustrator and writer
- Rosina Emmet Sherwood (1854–1948), American painter
- Rosina Smith (1891–1985), British communist activist
- Rosina Storchio (1872–1945), Italian lyric soprano
- Rosina Thompson (1868–19??), British trance medium
- Rosina Tucker (1881–1987), American labor organizer
- Rosina Umelo (born 1930), Nigerian writer
- Rosina Vokes (1854–1894), British actress and dancer
- Rosina Wachtmeister (born 1939), Austrian artist
- Rosina Widmann (1826–1908), German educator
- Rosina Zornlin (1795–1859), British author

== Fictional characters ==
- Rosina (The Barber of Seville), a figure from Rossini's opera The Barber of Seville
- Rosina, central character of "The Invisible Girl", 1833 story by Mary Shelley
- Rosiña, starring role in the 1941 Spanish comedy film Stowaway on Board
- Rosina, daughter of the protagonist in the 1957 Italian film Il Grido

== See also ==
- Rosina (surname)
- Rosina (disambiguation)
- Rosine (given name)
