= Róisín =

- Pronunciation: English: /ˈroʊʃiːn, roʊˈʃiːn/ ROH-sheen, roh-SHEEN; Irish: [ˈɾˠoːʃiːnʲ, ɾˠoːˈʃiːnʲ]
- Gender: Female

Origin
- Origin: Irish
- Meaning: 'little rose'
- Region of origin: Irish

Other names
- Related names: Róisín Dubh, Rose, Rosie

Róisín, sometimes anglicized as Roisin or Rosheen, is an Irish female given name, meaning "little rose". The English equivalent is Rose, Rosaleen or Rosie.

== People ==
- Roisin Conaty, English comedian
- Roisin Dunne, guitarist in the group 7 Year Bitch
- Róisín Egenton (born 1977), winner of the 2000 Rose of Tralee
- Roisin Gilheany (born 2005), Australian tennis player
- Róisín Ingle (born 1971), Irish Times columnist, editor and "podcaster"
- Róisín McAliskey (born 1971), Irish political activist
- Roisin McAuley, TV reporter and author
- Roisin McGettigan (born 1980), Irish athlete
- Róisín McLaren, Scottish political activist
- Róisín Murphy (born 1973), Irish singer/songwriter
- Róisín O (born 1988), Irish singer/songwriter
- Róisín O'Donovan (born 1989), Irish actress and film director
- Róisín Shortall (born 1954), Irish politician
- Róisín Upton (born 1994), Irish field hockey international

== Literature ==
Róisín Dubh is a personification of Ireland. It features in a song of the same name, which was translated into English as the nationalistic poem "Dark Rosaleen" by James Clarence Mangan.

Róisín is a fictional character from full time writer and screenwriter Jo Spain's book Don't Look Back.

== Music ==
- "Róisín Dubh" is a 16th-century Irish song translated into English by Pádraig Pearse.
- The Róisín Dubh is a renowned music venue in Galway.
- The Thin Lizzy Album Black Rose: A Rock Legend references Róisín Dubh in both title and the final track.
- The song The Dark Horse on the Wind by Liam Weldon mentions Róisín in the lyrics.
- Róisín is a 2026 album by artist Ciarán

== See also ==
- List of Irish-language given names
- Roisin (disambiguation)
- Rosine (given name)
