= 1679 =

1679 in various calendars
- Gregorian calendar: 1679; MDCLXXIX
- Ab urbe condita: 2432
- Armenian calendar: 1128; ԹՎ ՌՃԻԸ
- Assyrian calendar: 6429
- Balinese saka calendar: 1600–1601
- Bengali calendar: 1085–1086
- Berber calendar: 2629
- English Regnal year: 30 Cha. 2 – 31 Cha. 2
- Buddhist calendar: 2223
- Burmese calendar: 1041
- Byzantine calendar: 7187–7188
- Chinese calendar: 戊午年 (Earth Horse); 4376 or 4169 — to — 己未年 (Earth Goat); 4377 or 4170
- Coptic calendar: 1395–1396
- Discordian calendar: 2845
- Ethiopian calendar: 1671–1672
- Hebrew calendar: 5439–5440
- Hindu calendars
- Vikram Samvat: 1735–1736
- Shaka Samvat: 1600–1601
- Kali Yuga: 4779–4780
- Holocene calendar: 11679
- Igbo calendar: 679–680
- Iranian calendar: 1057–1058
- Islamic calendar: 1089–1090
- Japanese calendar: Enpō 7 (延宝７年)
- Javanese calendar: 1601–1602
- Julian calendar: Gregorian minus 10 days
- Korean calendar: 4012
- Minguo calendar: 233 before ROC 民前233年
- Nanakshahi calendar: 211
- Thai solar calendar: 2221–2222
- Tibetan calendar: ས་ཕོ་རྟ་ལོ་ (male Earth-Horse); 1805 or 1424 or 652 — to — ས་མོ་ལུག་ལོ་ (female Earth-Sheep); 1806 or 1425 or 653

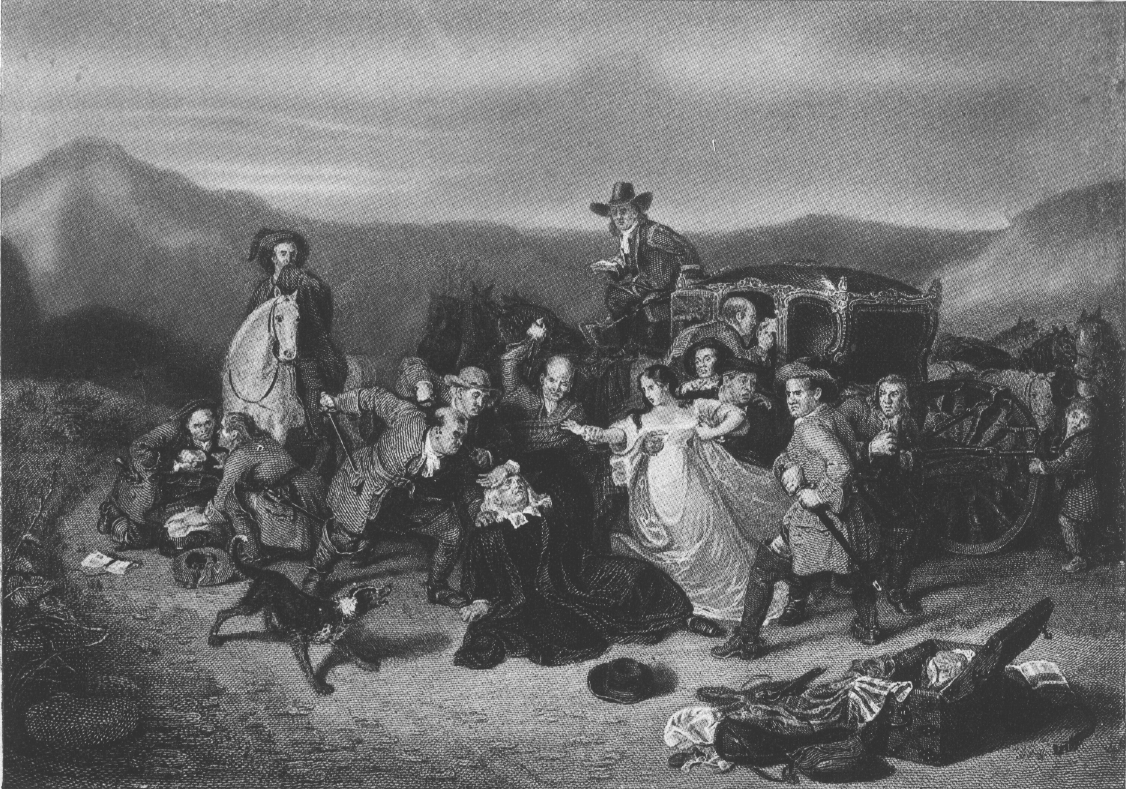
May 3: James Sharp, Archbishop of St Andrews for the Church of Scotland, is assassinated.(Engraving of lost 1840 painting by Sir William Allan).

1679 (MDCLXXIX) was a common year starting on Sunday of the Gregorian calendar and a common year starting on Wednesday of the Julian calendar, the 1679th year of the Common Era (CE) and Anno Domini (AD) designations, the 679th year of the 2nd millennium, the 79th year of the 17th century, and the 10th and last year of the 1670s decade. As of the start of 1679, the Gregorian calendar was 10 days ahead of the Julian calendar, which remained in localized use until 1923.

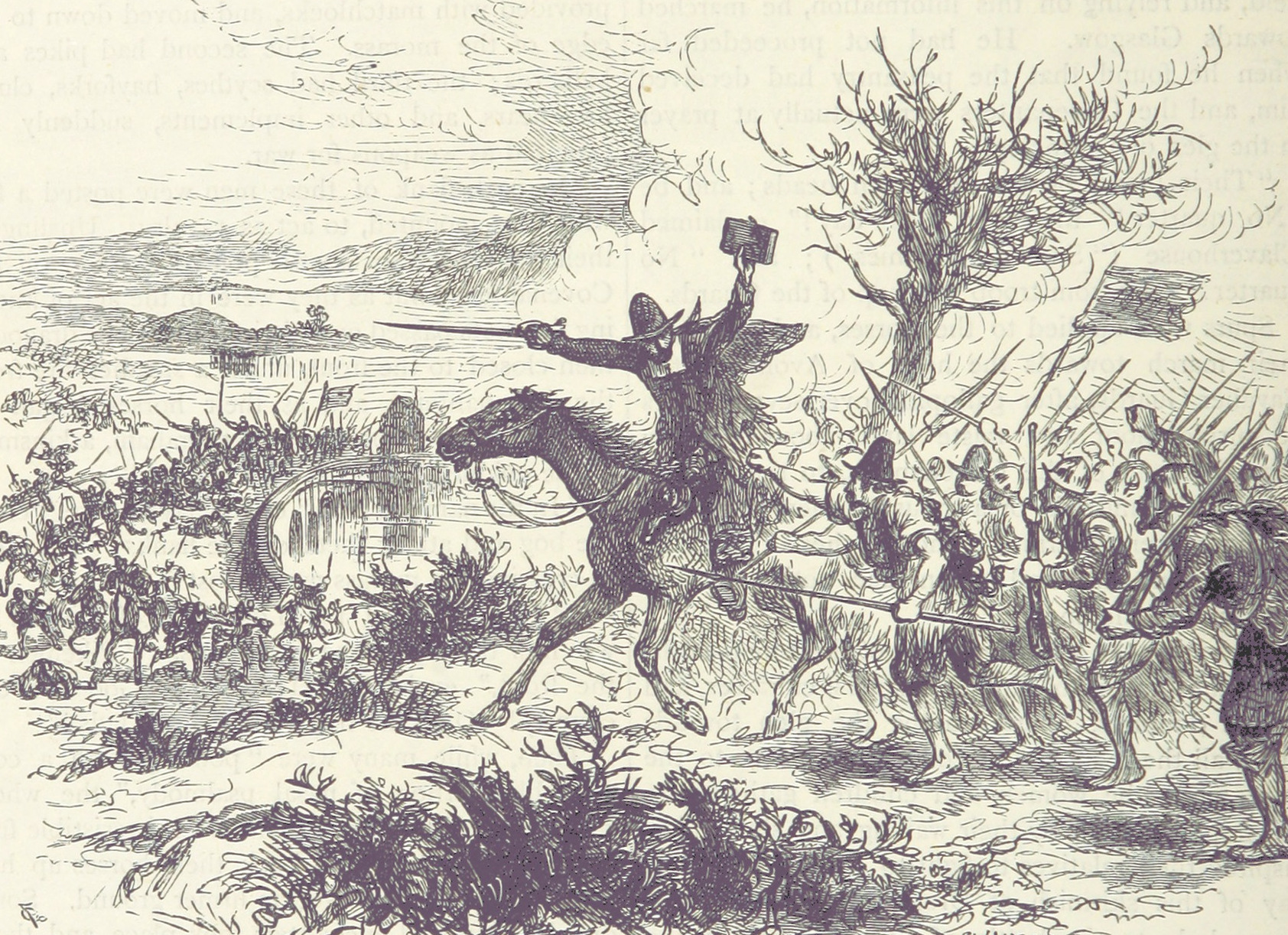
June 22: Battle of Bothwell Bridge.

== Events ==
=== January–March ===
- January 24 – King Charles II of England dissolves the "Cavalier Parliament", after nearly 18 years.
- January 30 – The Orthodox Confession of Faith is drafted up in the Buckinghamshire Assembly and signed by 54 messengers and elders of all Baptist churches in Buckinghamshire, Hertfordshire, Bedfordshire, and Oxfordshire, in England.
- February 3 – Moroccan troops from Fez are killed, along with their commander Moussa ben Ahmed ben Youssef, in a battle against rebels in the Jbel Saghro mountain range, but Moroccan Sultan Ismail Ibn Sharif is able to negotiate a ceasefire allowing his remaining troops safe passage back home.
- February 5 – The Treaty of Celle is signed between France and Sweden on one side, and the Holy Roman Empire, at the town of Celle in Saxony (in modern-day Germany). Sweden's sovereignty over Bremen-Verden is confirmed and Sweden cedes control of Thedinghausen and Dörverden to the Germans.
- February 19 – Ajit Singh Rathore becomes the new Maharaja of the Jodhpur State a principality in India also known as Marwar, located in the modern-day Rajasthan state.
- March 6 – In England, the "Habeas Corpus Parliament" (or "First Exclusion Parliament") is opened.
- March 12 – Catherine Deshayes Monvoisin, commonly called "La Voisin" and the suspected killer of over 1,000 people in France by poisoning, is arrested outside of the Church of Notre-Dame-de-Bonne-Nouvelle in Paris and imprisoned at Vincennes for the next 11 months. After her conviction, she is publicly burned at the stake on February 22, 1680.

=== April–June ===
- April 3 – Aurangazeb, the Muslim ruler of the Mughal Empire in India, decrees the imposition of the jizya, an annual tax upon non-Muslims under Mughal jurisdiction, primarily Hindus. The tax had been abolished by Aurangazeb's great grandfather, Akbar.
- April 8 – In the Italian region of Piedmont, a landslide causes the village of Bosia to sink into the ground and then get buried, killing 200 inhabitants. The village is then rebuilt at another site and continues to exist.
- April 10 – A total eclipse of the Sun takes place over North America, with its peak over the region occupied by the Lakota Sioux people in modern-day South Dakota.
- May 3 – James Sharp, the Church of Scotland's Archbishop of St Andrews, is assassinated at Magus Muir in Fife, when his coach is ambushed by a group of nine of the Scottish Covenanters. Only two of the assassins, David Hackston and Andrew Guillan, are captured.
- May 27 – The Parliament of England passes the Habeas Corpus Act, "for the better securing the liberty of the subject" and then adjourns.
- June 1 – Battle of Drumclog: A group of 200 Scottish Covenanters overwhelm a small Scottish Army unit, that had been pursuing them for the murder of Archbishop Sharp. The Covenanters, led by 19-year-old William Cleland, kill 36 of the Scottish soldiers.
- June 4 – A 6.4 magnitude earthquake in Armenia strikes near Yerevan, at the time part of the Persian Empire.
- June 22 – Battle of Bothwell Bridge in Scotland: Royal forces led by James Scott, 1st Duke of Monmouth and John Graham of Claverhouse subdue the Scottish Covenanters.

=== July–September ===
- July 12 – In England, the "Habeas Corpus Parliament" (or "First Exclusion Parliament") is dissolved, while in recess, by King Charles II. The King exercises his royal prerogative of dissolution to prevent the parliament from passing a bill that would exclude non-Anglicans from the succession to the English throne, specifically the king's Roman Catholic brother, James, Duke of York, as part of the Exclusion Crisis.
- August 7 – The brigantine Le Griffon, commissioned by René-Robert Cavelier, Sieur de La Salle, is towed to the southern end of the Niagara River, to become the first ship to sail the upper Great Lakes of North America.
- September 2 – The 8.0 M_{w} magnitude Sanhe-Pinggu earthquake devastates Beijing and Hebei in China.
- September 18 – The Province of New Hampshire is separated from the Massachusetts Bay Colony.

=== October–December ===
- October 4 – Bil'arab bin Sultan becomes the new Imam of Oman upon the death of his father, Sultan bin Saif.
- October 6 – Mughal Emperor Aurangzeb returns control of Bengal to the local Nawab of Murshidabad after removing his son, Prince Qutb-ud-Din Muhammad Azam, from the position of Mughal Governor of Dhaka.
- October 12 – Representatives of the Dutch Republic and the Kingdom of Sweden sign the last of the nine Treaties of Nijmegen, ending the last of the conflicts that began during the Franco-Dutch War.
- October 18 – A sea battle is fought between England's Royal Navy and the navy of India's Maratha Empire (under the command of Mai Nayak Bhandari), with English bombardment driving the Maratha occupation of the island fortress at Khanderi (off of the western Indian coast south of Mumbai).
- November 27 – A fire in Boston, Massachusetts, burns all of the warehouses, 80 houses, and all of the ships in the dockyards.
- December 3 – French explorers René-Robert Cavelier, Sieur de La Salle (commonly called "La Salle") and Henri de Tonti set off from their fort near Niagara Falls in North America on the first European expedition to explore the upper Mississippi River.
- December 10
  - More than 200 captives on the ship The Crown of London, all Scottish Covenanters arrested after the battle of Bothwell Bridge, are killed when the ship is wrecked on the Orkney Islands while transporting the group to exile in North America.
  - A peace treaty is signed between Ali Bey al-Muradi, Bey of Tunis; his brother whom he had overthrown in 1678, Muhammad Bey al-Muradi; and their uncle, Muhammad al-Hafsi al-Muradi, the Pasha of Tunis, after mediation by the Dey of Algiers.
- December 16 (December 6 O.S.) – Oliver Plunkett, the Roman Catholic Primate of All Ireland and Archbishop of Armagh, is arrested on false charges of plotting to aid a French invasion of the British Isles, the so-called "Popish Plot". Executed in 1681, Plunkett will be canonized as a Roman Catholic saint almost 300 years later in 1975.
- December 26 – In modern-day Indonesia, the Trunajaya rebellion comes to an end with the surrender of Prince Panembahan Maduretno to the Sultan Amangkurat II of Mataram, ruler of the entire island of Java. While treated with respect as a prisoner of the occupying forces of the Dutch East India Company (Verenigde Oostindische Compagnie or VOC), Panembahan is killed seven days later by Amangkurat after the VOC allows him to attend a ceremonial visit to the sultan's palace.

=== Date unknown ===
- The Tibet–Ladakh–Mughal war (1679–84) begins with the Tibetan invasion of Ladakh.
- French explorer Daniel Greysolon, Sieur du Lhut, explores the Saint Louis River; the city of Duluth, Minnesota, will take its name from him.
- Malpas Tunnel on the Canal du Midi in Hérault, France, Europe's first navigable canal tunnel, is excavated by Pierre-Paul Riquet (169 metres (554 ft), concrete lined).

== Births ==
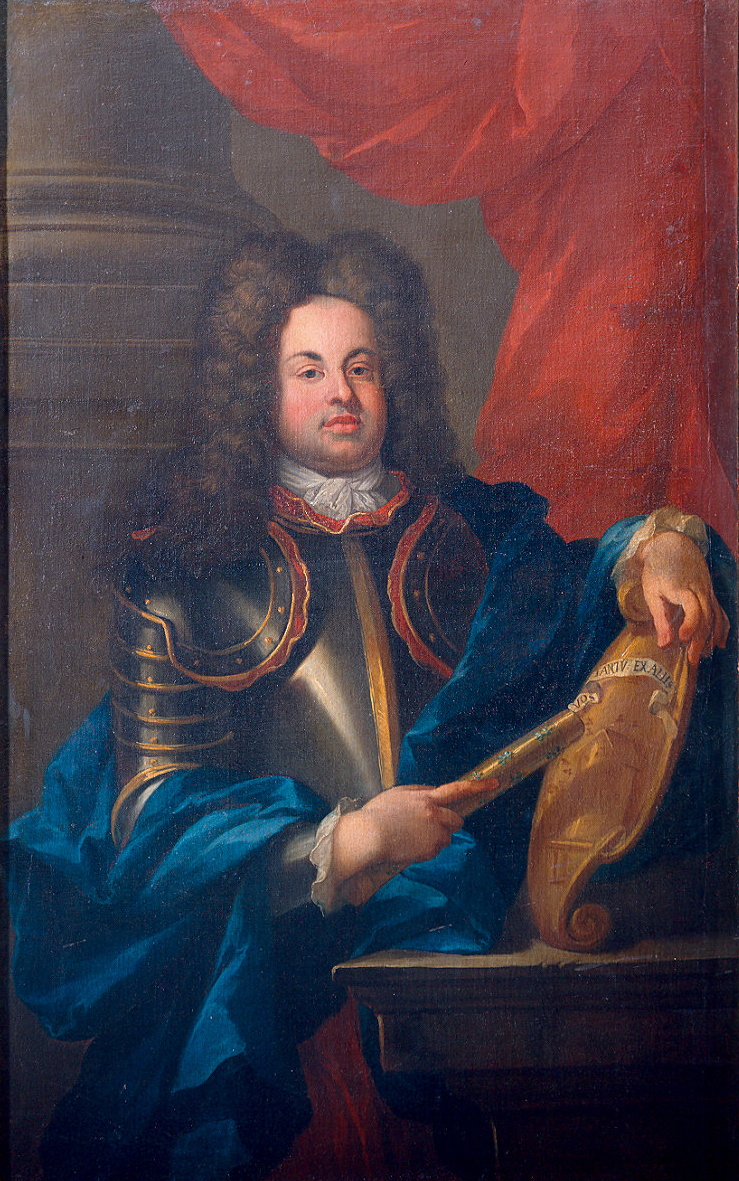
Antonio Farnese

- January 24 – Christian Wolff, German philosopher (d. 1754)
- March 18 – Matthew Decker, English merchant and writer (d. 1749)
- March 29 – Benedict Calvert, 4th Baron Baltimore, colonial governor of Maryland (d. 1715)
- May 29 – Antonio Farnese, Duke of Parma (d. 1731)
- August 16 – Catharine Trotter Cockburn, English novelist, dramatist, philosopher (d. 1749)
- August 22 – Pierre Guérin de Tencin, French cardinal (d. 1758)
- October 13 – Princess Magdalena Augusta of Anhalt-Zerbst, Duchess of Saxe-Gotha-Altenburg (d. 1740)
- October 16 – Jan Dismas Zelenka, Bohemian composer (d. 1745)
- October 18 – Ann Putnam, Jr., American accuser in the Salem witch trials (d. 1716)
- November 11 – Firmin Abauzit, French scientist (d. 1767)
- date unknown
  - James Erskine, Lord Grange, Scottish judge (d. 1754)
  - George Psalmanazar, French-born imposter and essayist (d. 1763)
  - Francesco Zerafa, Maltese architect (d. 1758)

== Deaths ==
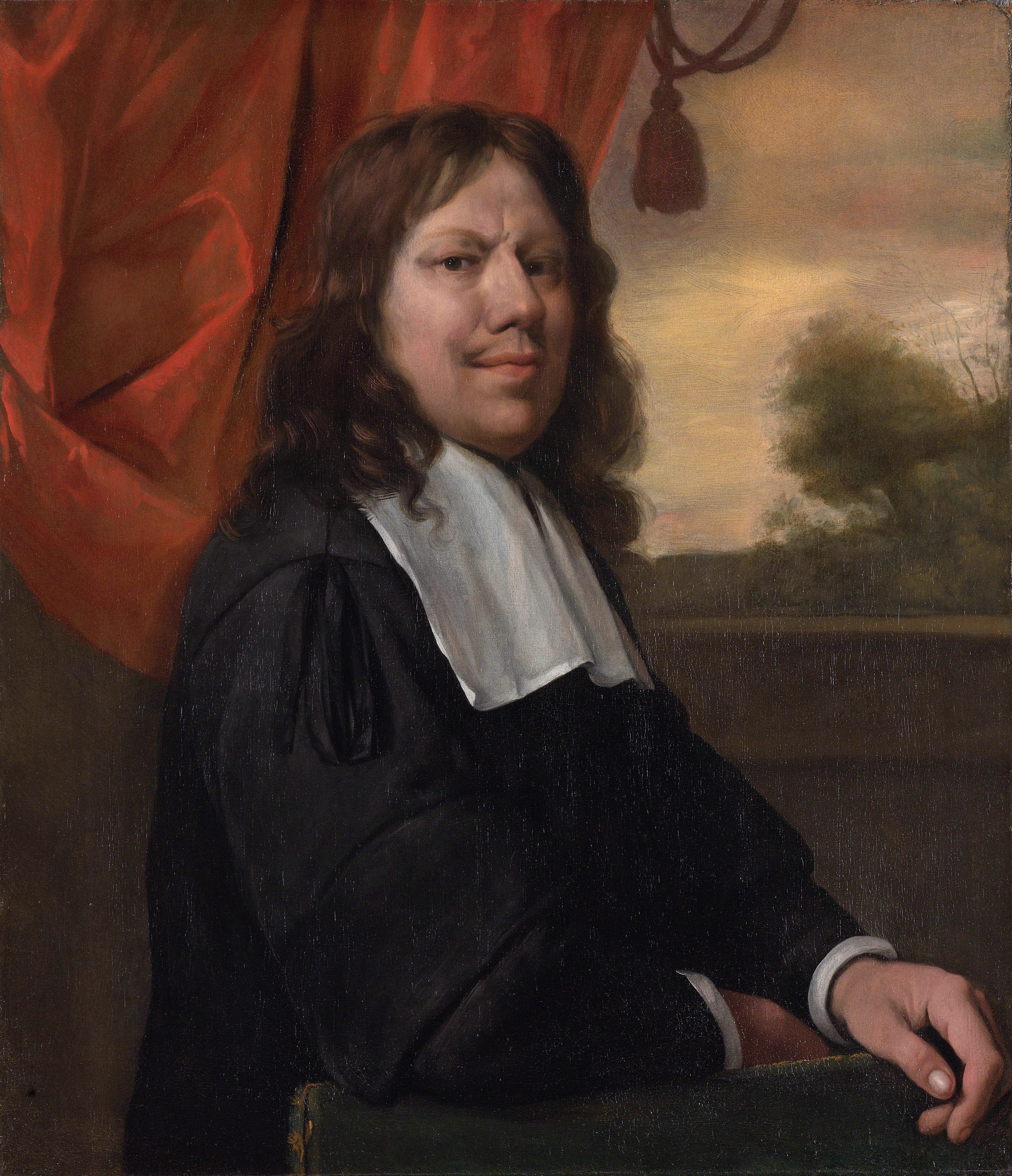
Jan Steen

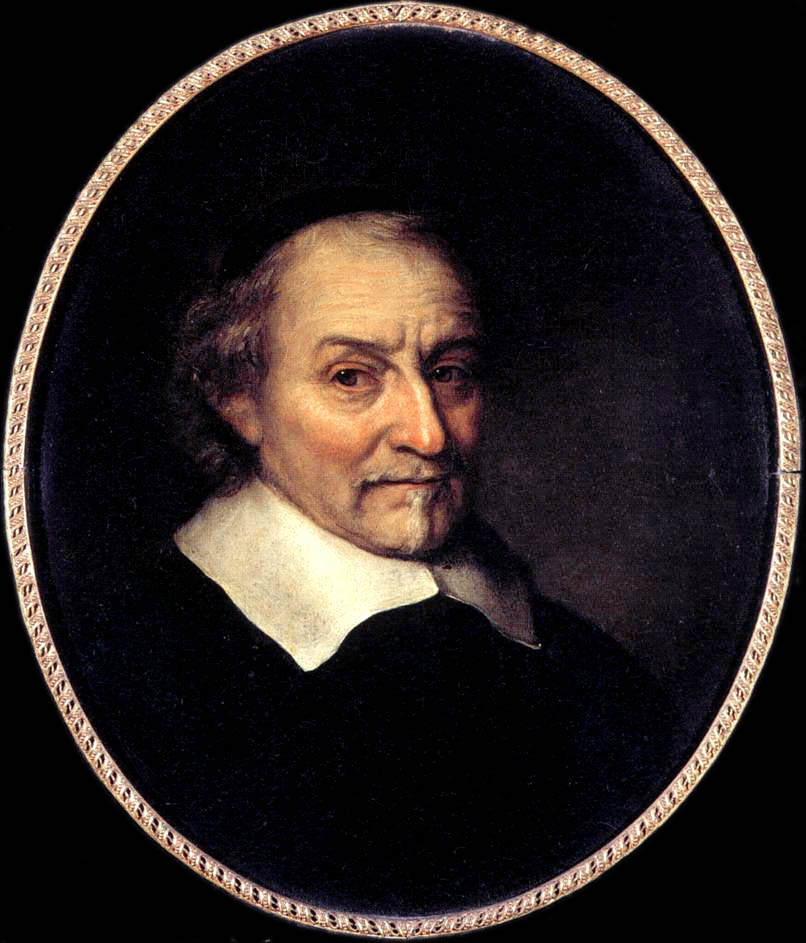
Joost van den Vondel

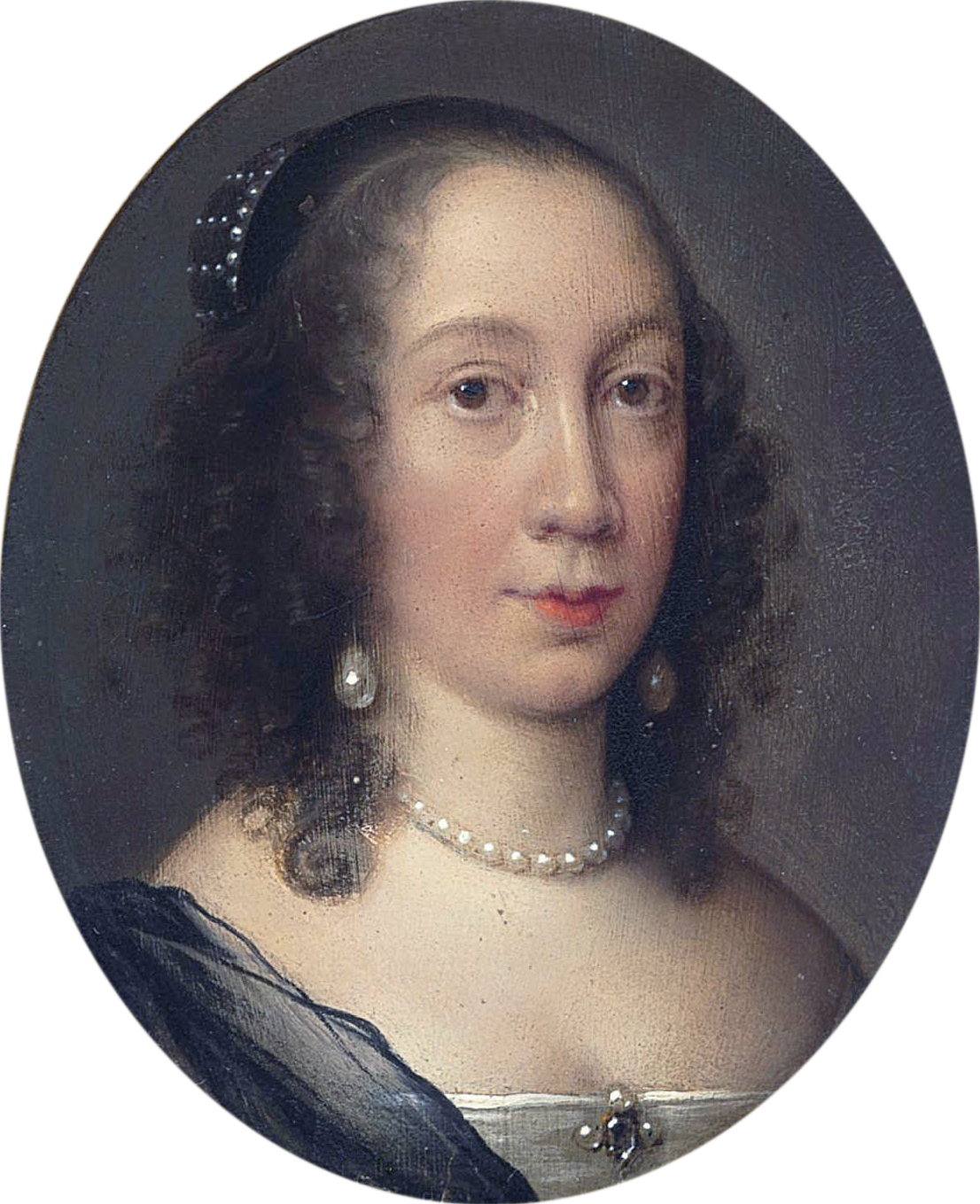
Dorothy, Lady Pakington

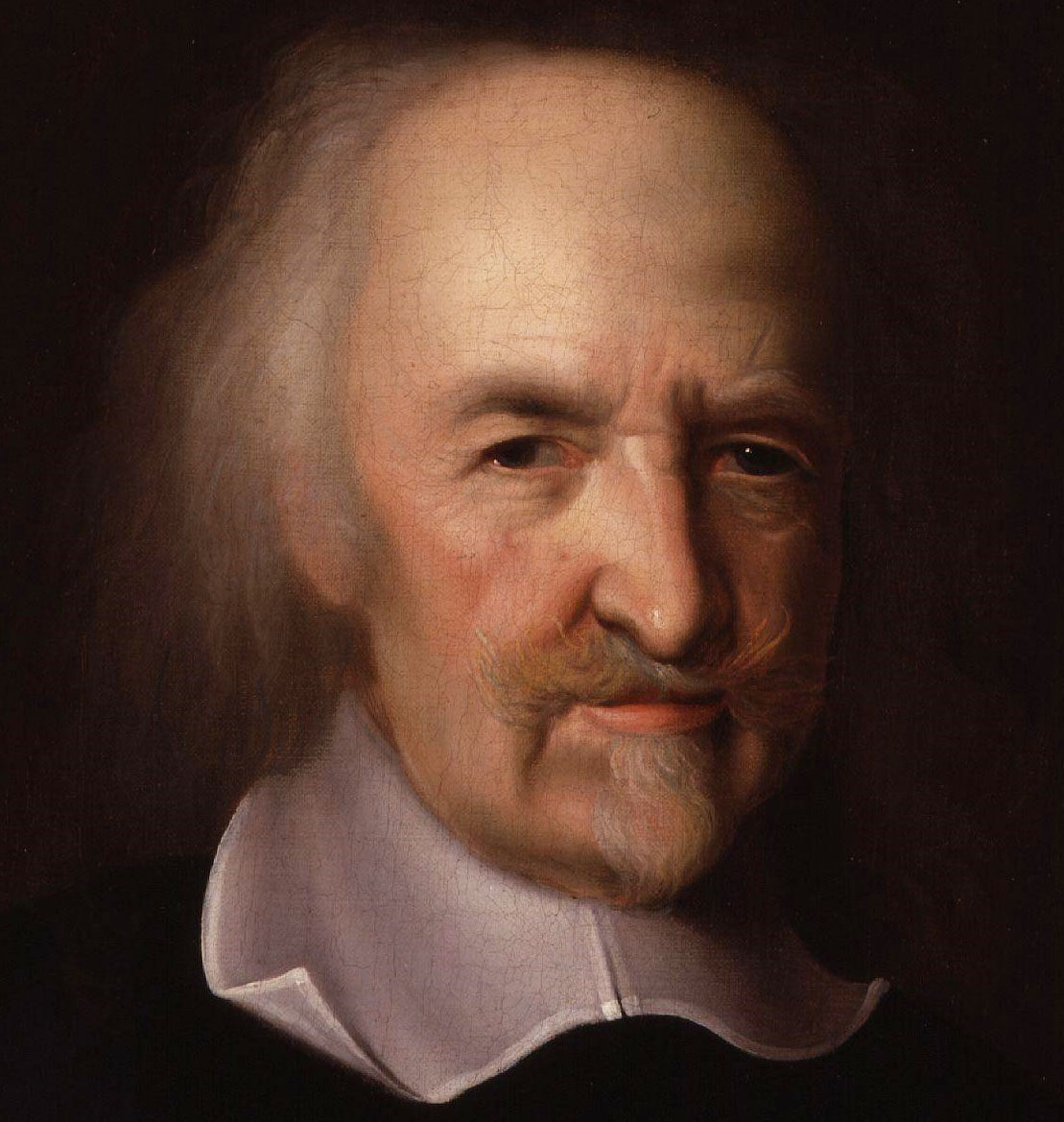
Thomas Hobbes

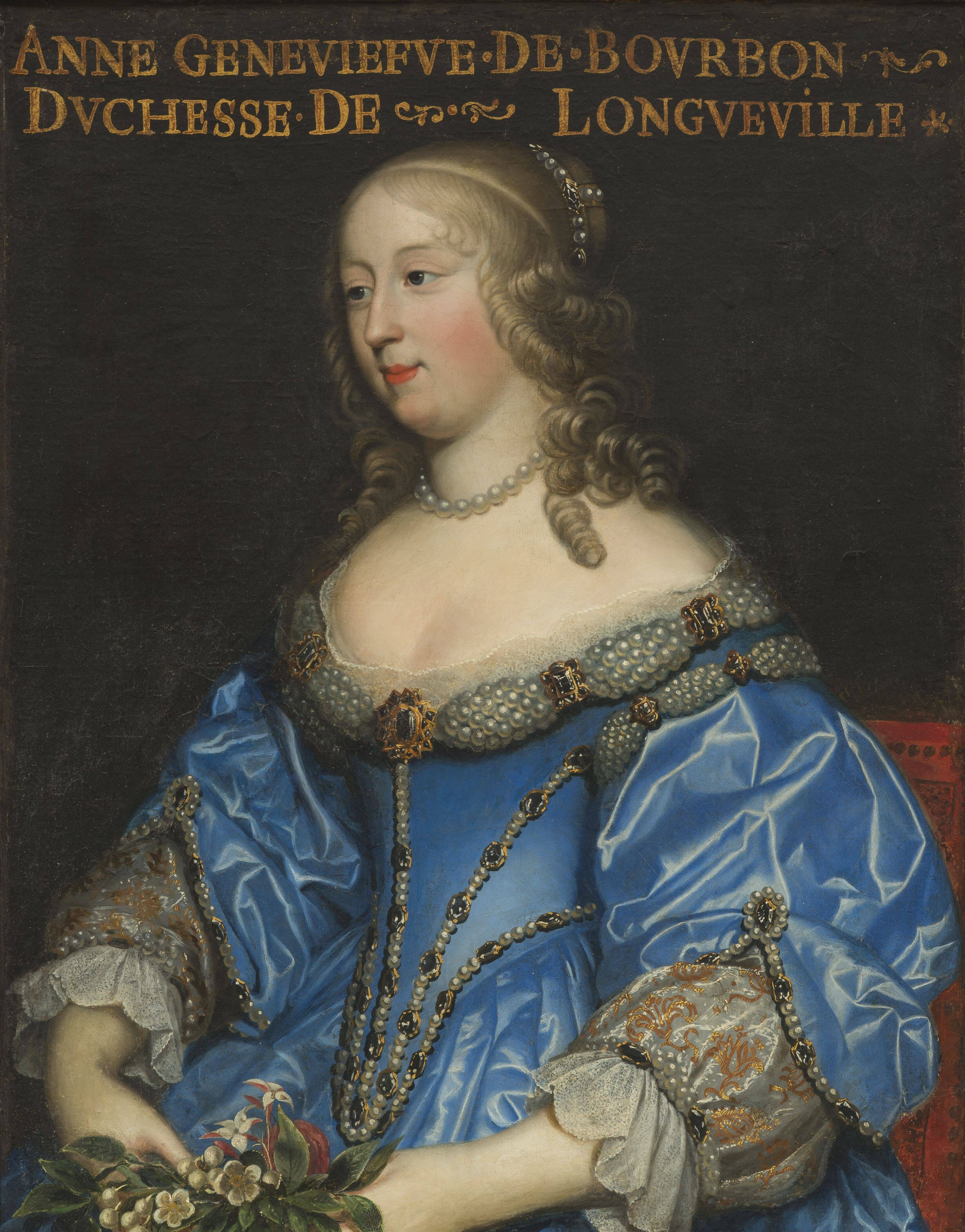
Anne Geneviève de Bourbon

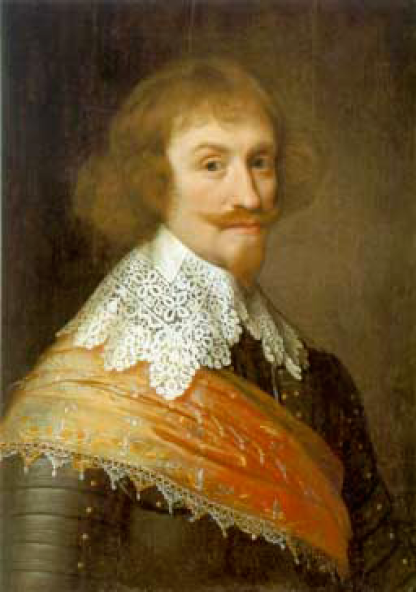
John Maurice

- January 1 – Jan Steen, Dutch painter (b. c. 1626)
- January 8 – Raymond Breton, French missionary (b. 1609)
- January 14 – Jacques de Billy, French Jesuit mathematician (b. 1602)
- January 15 – Pierre Lambert de la Motte, French bishop (b. 1624)
- January 24
  - Ulderico Carpegna, Italian Catholic cardinal (b. 1595)
  - Maurice Henry, Prince of Nassau-Hadamar (1653–1679) (b. 1626)
- January 29 – Carlo Ceresa, Italian painter (b. 1609)
- February 5 – Joost van den Vondel, Dutch dramatist and poet (b. 1587)
- February 6 – Margherita de' Medici, Italian duchess regent of Parma (b. 1612)
- February 18 – Lady Anne Finch Conway, English philosopher (b. 1631)
- February 19 – Henricus Regius, Dutch philosopher (b. 1598)
- February 19 – Thomas Hales, Connecticut settler (b. 1610)
- February 22 – Henrik Rysensteen, Dutch military engineer (b. 1624)
- March 11
  - Sir John Covert, 1st Baronet, English politician (b. 1620)
  - Luise Marie of the Palatinate, German princess (b. 1647)
- March 16
  - John Leverett, Governor of the Massachusetts Bay Colony (b. 1616)
  - Johan Frederik von Marschalck, German-born landowner, Chancellor of Norway (b. 1618)
  - Johannes Schefferus, Alsatian-born humanist (b. 1621)
- March 27 – Abraham Mignon, Dutch golden age painter (b. 1640)
- April – Thomas Notley, Colonial governor of Maryland (b. 1632)
- April 5 – Anne Geneviève de Bourbon, French princess and political activist (b. 1619)
- May 3 – James Sharp, Scottish archbishop (assassinated) (b. 1613)
- May 5 – Magnus Celsius, Swedish astronomer and mathematician (b. 1621)
- May 6 – Peregrine Hoby, English politician (b. 1602)
- May 9 – Miguel Mañara, was the main founder of the Hospital de la Caridad in Seville (b. 1627)
- May 10 – Dorothy, Lady Pakington, English religious writer (b. 1623)
- May 14 – August of Legnica, Silesian nobleman (b. 1627)
- May 26 – Ferdinand Maria, Elector of Bavaria (b. 1636)
- June 3 – Francisque Millet, Flemish-French painter (b. 1642)
- June 7 – Princess Christine Elisabeth of Schleswig-Holstein-Sonderburg, German noblewoman (b. 1638)
- June 15 – Guillaume Courtois, French painter (b. 1628)
- June 27 – Pablo Bruna, blind Spanish composer and organist (b. 1611)
- July 4 – Antoine Garaby de La Luzerne, French poet (b. 1617)
- July 11 – William Chamberlayne, English poet (b. 1619)
- July 19 – Francis Anderson, English politician (b. 1614)
- July 26 – Edward Bayntun, English politician (b. 1618)
- August – Catherine Lepère, French midwife (b. 1601)
- August 6 – John Snell, English royalist (b. 1629)
- August 12 – Marie de Rohan, French courtier and political activist (b. 1600)
- August 20 – Jacob Alting, Dutch linguist (b. 1618)
- August 24 – Jean François Paul de Gondi, Cardinal de Retz, French churchman and agitator (b. 1614)
- August 28 – Alfonso Litta, Cardinal, Archbishop of Milan (b. 1608)
- August 29 – Margaret Mostyn, English Carmelite nun (b. 1625)
- September 9 – John Gurdon, English politician (b. 1595)
- September 11 – Nicolaes Visscher I (buried), Dutch engraver, cartographer and publisher (b. 1618)
- September 17 – John Joseph of Austria, Spanish general (b. 1629)
- September 25 – Philips Augustijn Immenraet, Flemish painter (b. 1627)
- September 29 – John Manners, 8th Earl of Rutland, English politician when he inherited the peerage (b. 1604)
- October 1 – Antonia of Württemberg, princess, literary figure, patron, and Christian Kabbalist (b. 1613)
- October 2 – Sir William Bowyer, 1st Baronet, English politician (b. 1612)
- October 3 – Hugh Bethell, English Member of Parliament and High Sheriff (b. 1615)
- October 12 – William Gurnall, English writer (b. 1617)
- October 26 – Roger Boyle, 1st Earl of Orrery, British soldier, statesman, and dramatist (b. 1621)
- November 11 – Rosina Schnorr, German businessperson (b. 1618)
- November 19 – Roger Conant, Massachusetts governor, founder of Salem, Massachusetts (b. 1592)
- November 27 – Archibald Primrose, Lord Carrington, Scottish judge (b. 1616)
- December 4 – Thomas Hobbes, English philosopher (b. 1588)
- December 10 – Francesco Barberini, Italian Catholic cardinal (b. 1597)
- December 20 – John Maurice, Prince of Nassau-Siegen (b. 1604)
- December 18 – John Frederick, Duke of Brunswick-Lüneburg, Duke of Brunswick-Calenberg (1665–1679) (b. 1625)
- December 21 – Claude Lamoral, 3rd Prince of Ligne, Spanish general and prince (b. 1618)
- December 28
  - Peder Winstrup, Bishop of Lund (b. 1605)
  - Andrzej Trzebicki, nobleman and priest in the Polish-Lithuanian Commonwealth (b. 1607)
- December 31 – Giovanni Alfonso Borelli, Italian physiologist and physicist (b. 1608)
