= Raisin (disambiguation) =

A raisin is a dried grape.

Raisin may also refer to:

- Raisin (surname)
- Raisin (musical), musical version of Lorraine Hansberry's play A Raisin in the Sun
  - Raisin (original Broadway cast recording), a 1973 album containing a recording of the musical made by its original 1973 Broadway cast
- "Raisins" (South Park), a 2003 episode of South Park
- "Raisins", a song by Zzbra from the album Zzbra: Original Motion Picture Soundtrack, 2012
- Raisin, former name of Raisin City, California
- Raisin Charter Township, Michigan
- Raisin, Demi-raisin, and Double raisin are French paper sizes
- Raisin Bank AG, owned by Raisin SE, provides banking services which include the raisin.com (Raisin) platform

== See also ==
- Rasin (disambiguation)
- Resin (disambiguation)
