= Resin (disambiguation) =

Resins are hydrocarbon secretions of many plants, particularly coniferous trees.

Resin may also refer to:

- Ion-exchange resin, an insoluble matrix (or support structure) normally in the form of small beads fabricated from an organic polymer substrate
- Reactive resin, a material used in some bowling ball coverstocks
- Resin, a common name for hashish, a drug made from the resin of cannabis
- Small spherical polymer beads used in synthetic chemistry, specifically solid-phase synthesis
- Synthetic resin, an artificial chemical substance which hardens irreversibly, usually a thermosetting plastic or one of the monomeric components thereof

== Other uses ==
- Resin or Rezin, the name of the last known king of Ancient Syria
- Vladimir Resin (born 1936), appointed acting mayor of Moscow on 28 September 2010
- "Resin", a song by In Flames from Colony (album)
- "Resin", a song by Dustin Tebbutt
- Resin (software), Caucho's Java servlet container, application server and PHP server
- Resin (film), a 2001 American drama film

== See also ==
- Rasin (disambiguation)
- Raisin (disambiguation)
- Rosin (disambiguation)
- Rezin
