= Razin =

Razin may refer to:

- Razin (surname), a Russian surname

== Places ==
- Razin, Ahar, East Azerbaijan Province, Iran
- Razin, Khoda Afarin, East Azerbaijan Province, Iran
- Razin, Hamadan, Hamadan Province, Iran
- Razin, Kermanshah, Kermanshah Province, Iran
- Razin, Markazi, Markazi Province, Iran

== See also ==
- Rasin (surname)
- Stenka Razin (disambiguation)
