= Rosine (given name) =

- Gender: feminine

Other names
- Related names: Rose, Rosina

Rosine is a given name.

== Notable people with this name ==
- Rosine de Chabaud-Latour (1794–1860), French religious thinker and writer
- Rosine Bloch (1832–1891), French opera singer
- Rosine Delamare (1911–2013), French costume designer
- Rosine Deréan (1910–2001), French actress
- Rosine Faugouin (1930–2018), French sprinter
- Rosine Guiterman (1886–1960), Australian activist, teacher, poet and humanitarian
- Rosine Laborde (1824–1907), French singer
- Rosine Lallement, French astronomer
- Rosine Luguet (1921–1981), French actress
- Rosine Mbakam (born 1980), Cameroonian film director
- Rosine Elisabeth Menthe (1663–1701), second wife of Duke Rudolph Augustus of Brunswick-Wolfenbüttel
- Rosine Perelberg (born 1951), Brazilian-born British psychoanalyst
- Rosine Roland (born 1948), Belgian canoeist
- Johanna Rosine Snoek, known as Hans Snoek (1910–2001), Dutch dancer
- Rosine Sori-Coulibaly (born 1958), Burkinabé economist and politician
- Rosine Stoltz (1815–1903), French opera singer
- Rosine Streeter, trade unionist from New Caledonia
- Rosine Vieyra Soglo (1934–2021), member of the Pan-African Parliament from Benin
- Rosine Wallez (born 1957), Belgian sprinter
- Rosine Siewe Yamaleu (born 1991), Cameroonian footballer

== Fictional characters ==
- Princess Rosine in 1636 play L'Illusion Comique
- Countess Rosine in 1911 opera Oberst Chabert
- Rosine, protagonist in 1926 silent film The Marriage of Rosine
- Rosine Brown, penniless widow in 1932 film But the Flesh Is Weak
- Rosine, maid in 1974 opera Signor Deluso
- Rosine, flamboyant Puerto Rican Latina character in The Jerky Boys comedy act (1989–present)
- Rosine, a character in the Berserk manga (1989–present)
- Rosine, ambitious student in 1998 film Autumn Tale

== See also ==
- Paulo Rosine (died 1993), leader of Martinican band Malavoi
- Rosina (given name)
- Róisín, Irish given name
- Rosine (disambiguation)
