= Rosaleen =

Rosaleen is an Irish female first name. It is an Anglicized version of the Irish name Róisín, the diminutive of "rose" in the Irish language; it therefore means "little rose". It has use in Ireland since the 16th century, possibly popularised by Rosaline in Shakespeare's Romeo and Juliet.

The name featured in "Dark Rosaleen" by James Clarence Mangan, a patriotic poem disguised as a love song, in a time when nationalistic expression was outlawed in Ireland. Thus the name is a poetic symbol of Ireland. Dark Rosaleen is also the name of a novel by Elizabeth O'Shea Dillon, published in 1884, which was serialised in United Ireland.

== People with the given name ==
- Rosaleen Davey (born 1947), Irish visual artist
- Rosaleen Linehan (born 1937), Irish stage, screen and television actress
- Rosaleen Love (born 1940), Australian science journalist and writer
- Rosaleen McDonagh, activist, playwright and Irish Traveller
- Rosaleen Mills (1905–1993), Irish activist and educator
- Rosaleen Moriarty-Simmonds (born 1960), British businesswoman, artist and disability rights campaigner
- Rosaleen Norton (1917–1979), New Zealand-born Australian artist and occultist
