= Rosine =

Rosine may refer to:

- Rosine (given name), list of people and fictional characters with this name
- Rosine, a film directed by Christine Carrière awarded a César in 1996
- "Rosine", a song by singer Soukous and composer Aurlus Mabélé
- Rosine, Kentucky, an unincorporated town in Ohio County, United States

== See also ==
- Dewey Avenue–West Rosine Historic District in St. Joseph, Missouri, United States
- Rosin (disambiguation)
- Rosina (disambiguation)
- Rose (disambiguation)
