= Der Irland-Krimi =

- Created by: Marianne Wendt; Christian Schiller
- Country of origin: Germany

Original release
- Network: ARD (broadcaster)
- Release: 24 October 2019

Der Irland-Krimi is a German crime television series aired from 2019 on Germany's public television station, ARD and starring Désirée Nosbusch as Detective Cathrin Blake.

== Plot ==
The series is aired in Ireland, where the German police psychologist Cathrin Blake, falls into alcoholism after the disappearance of her husband Liam. She now lives with her son, who has become a police officer like his father.

When her husband's body is discovered in a mass grave, and after overcoming her addiction, she returns to work, but no longer in the police force.

== Starring ==
- Désirée Nosbusch: Detective Cathrin Blake
- Mercedes Müller
- Róisín O'Donovan: Sarah Kelly
- Rebecca O'Mara
- Nathan O'Toole
- Kerri Quinn
- Emma Eliza Regan
