= Roisin =

Roisin may refer to:

- Róisín, Roisin or Rosheen, an Irish female given name (including a list of persons with the name)
- "Róisín Dubh" (song), an Irish political song
- "Róisín Dubh", a track from the Thin Lizzy album Black Rose: A Rock Legend
- Róisín Dubh (music venue), Galway, Ireland
- LÉ Róisín (P51), a ship in the Irish Naval Service
- Roisin (Honnelles), a village in the Belgian municipality of Honnelles
- Róisín O'Donovan, Irish actress and film director
