= Nicolò Rusca =

Italian priest

Blessed Nicolò Rusca
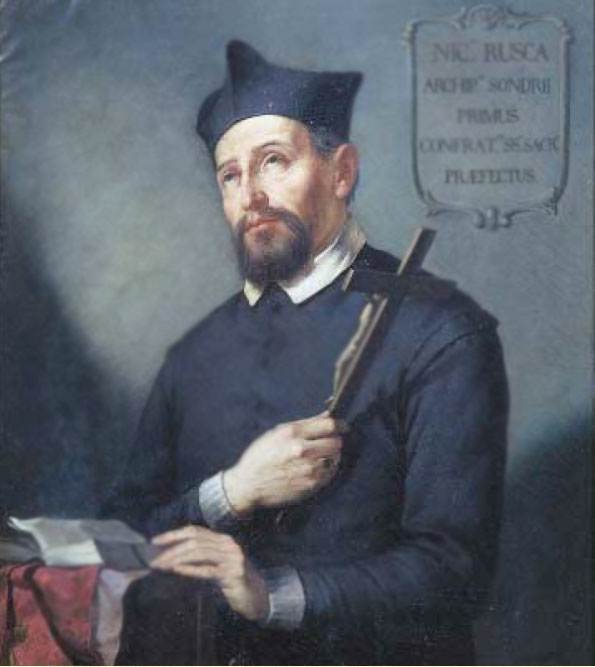

Martyr
- Born: 20 April 1563; Bedano, Ticino, Switzerland
- Died: 24 July 1618 (aged 55); Thusis, Graubünden, Switzerland
- Venerated in: Roman Catholic Church
- Beatified: 21 April 2013, Sondrio, Italy by Cardinal Angelo Amato
- Feast: 4 September
- Attributes: Book of hours, crucifix

Nicolò Rusca (20 April 1563 – 24 July 1618) was an Italian priest who served in the Diocese of Como. Rusca was arrested under false pretenses and was killed through the use of torture in 1618. He was recognized by the Roman Catholic Church as a martyr and was beatified in 2013.

== Biography ==
Rusca was born in 1563 to a family that belong to an ancient and noble house, the House of Rusconi. He was born to Giovanni Antonio and Daria. His siblings were Bartolomeo, Christopher and Daisy.

He commenced his theological studies in Milan from 1580 to 1587. Ordained to the priesthood in 1587 at the end of his time of study, he was appointed as the Archpriest of Sondrio. This was an appointment he was kept in until his death. He also tried to promote the teachings and decisions of the Council of Trent and also tried to cope with the rise of Protestantism in Europe. Rusca viewed Protestantism as something that would be dangerous to the church teachings.

Rusca was briefly arrested in 1608 and acquitted of breaching rules in relation to respect of religious tolerance. In 1618, he was taken by force by several soldiers and was accused of being part of violence against ministers of the Protestant faith and was subsequently arrested. Rusca was found guilty of this and subjected to torture for several days. Through torture, he died shortly after his arrest.

== Beatification ==
The local preliminaries for Rusca's beatification began on 3 May 1937. His cause started on 1 February 1934 under Pope Pius XI but was granted "nihil obstat" (nothing against) on 27 March 1995 under Pope John Paul II. This meant that he became a Servant of God. Pope Benedict XVI declared that Rusca died in hatred of the faith and proclaimed him to be a martyr on 19 December 2011, thus paving the way for his beatification. On behalf of Pope Francis, Rusca was beatified on 21 April 2013 by Cardinal Angelo Amato.

Many Protestants in the Swiss canton of Graubünden considered this act a provocation, and the Evangelical Reformed Church Was critical of the beatification. The local Bishop of Chur and the Reformed Church head issued a joint statement of supporting reconciliation.
