= Hans Snoek =

Dutch dancer (1910–2001)

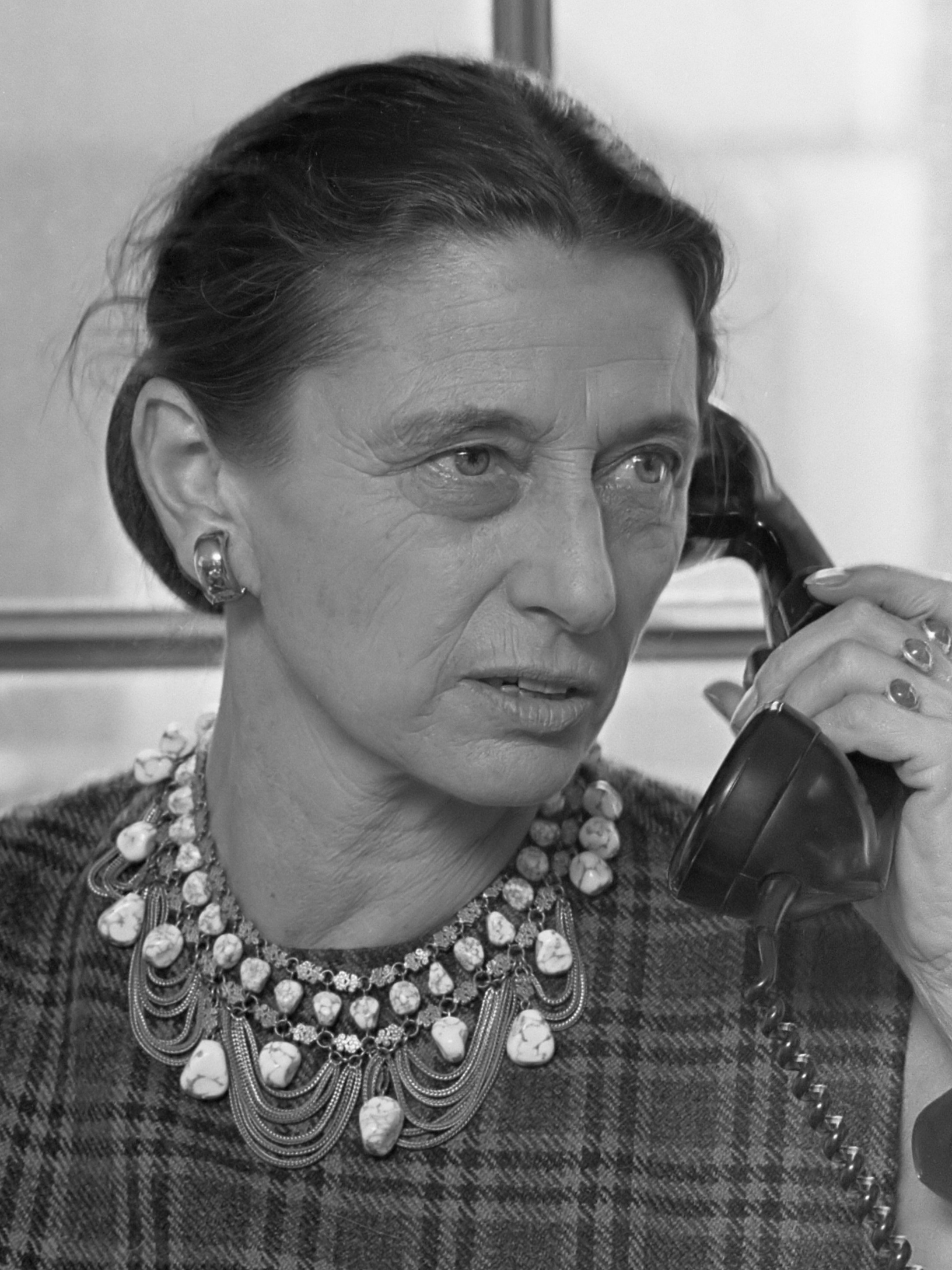
- Born: Johanna Rosine Snoek; 29 December 1910; Geertruidenberg, Netherlands
- Died: 27 September 2001 (aged 90); Amsterdam, Netherlands

Johanna Rosine Snoek, known as Hans Snoek, (29 December 1910 – 27 September 2001) was a Dutch dancer, choreographer and ballet director. She founded the Scapino Ballet.

The daughter of Leonard Salomon Snoek and Henderika Gerarda Trina Johanna ten Bruggencate, Snoek was born in Geertruidenberg. She studied dance with Kurt Jooss and Sigurd Leeder. During World War II, she staged performances in secret in support of the Dutch resistance.

She founded the Scapino Ballet in 1945 and the affiliated school Scapino Dansschool in 1951. The school later merged with Balletstudio Nel Roos to form the Dutch National Ballet Academy. She retired as ballet director for Scapino in 1970.

She choreographed a number of ballets including:

- De pasja en de beer
- Het papiernoodballet
- De krekel en de mier
- Dorp zonder mannen
- De tijgerprinses
- Vadertje tijd neemt even rust

Snoek also founded Assitej Netherlands, the youth theatre Jeugdtheater De Krakeling and the IVKO Montessori school of arts.

In 1960, she was named an Officer in the Order of Orange-Nassau.

Snoek was married twice: first to Nicolaas Wijnberg, a dancer, in 1939 and then, in 1951, to television director Erik Klaas de Vries.

In 2001, she died in Amsterdam at the age of 90.

The Hans Snoek Award was established by the Dutch Association of Theatre Directors.
