= Pedro Cornejo de Pedrosa =

Pedro Cornejo de Pedrosa (1536 – 31 March 1618) was a Spanish Carmelite, theologian, and professor of the University of Salamanca (cf. Salmanticenses).

== Life ==
Cornejo was born in Salamanca, Spain, and entered the Carmelite order at a young age. He received his doctorate from the University of Salamanca, and then taught philosophy and theology at the same institution.

During his own life he was renowned as an interpreter of St. Thomas Aquinas. Indeed, his reputation was so great that Philip III of Spain had recourse to him for advice on important matters.

Similarly when he traveled to Rome—for the general elections—Robert Cardinal Bellarmine is reported to have consult with him on several occasions, while Pope Paul V, upon hearing him lecture, called him "a truly worthy doctor of the Church of God."

He was eventually appointed rector of his order.

Some of his lectures were gathered and published posthumously under the title, Theologia Scholastica et Moralis etc. (Bamberg, 1671).

To his influence is credited the survival the philosophy of John Baconthorpe among the Spanish Carmelites.
