= Rašín =

- Municipality
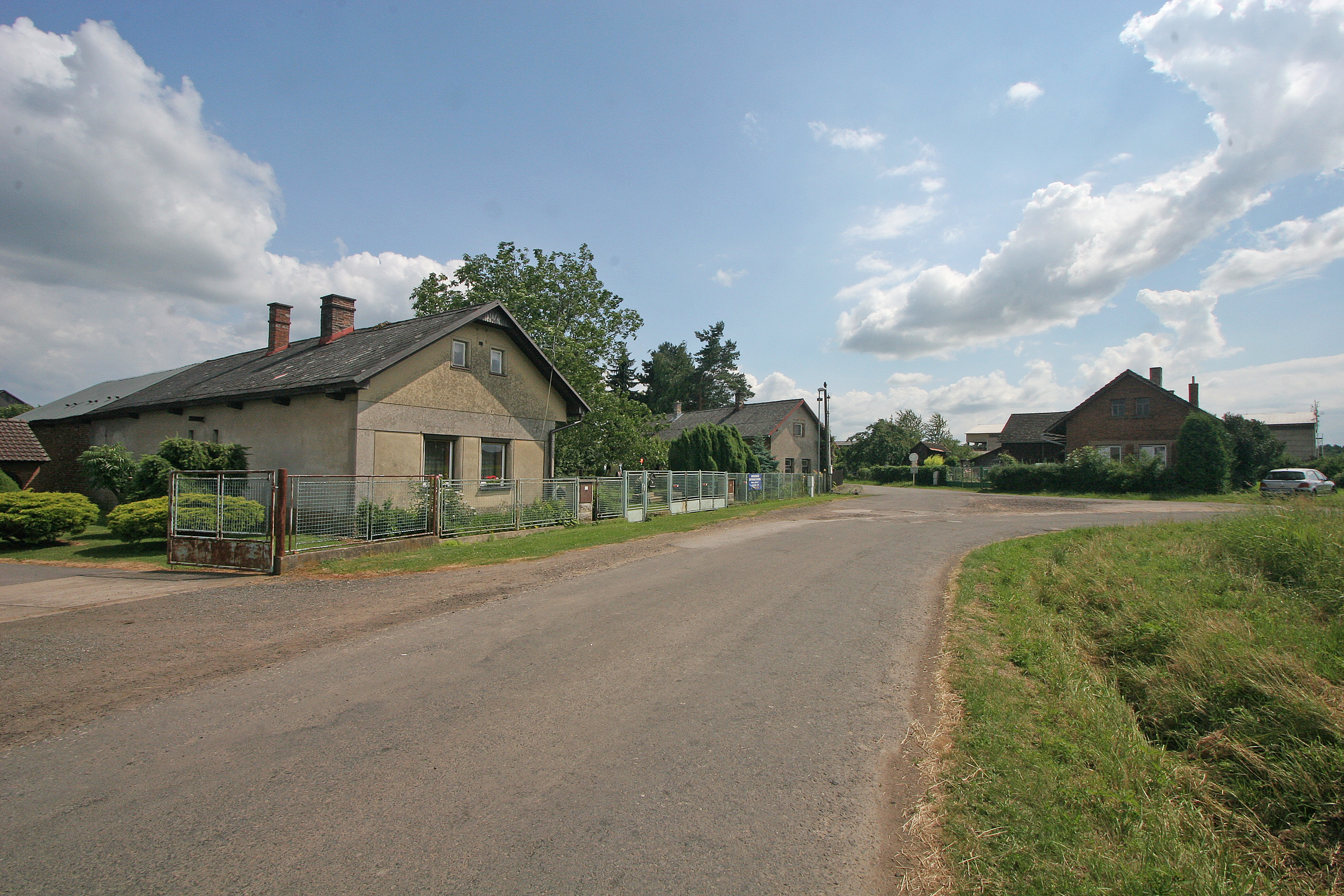
- Main street

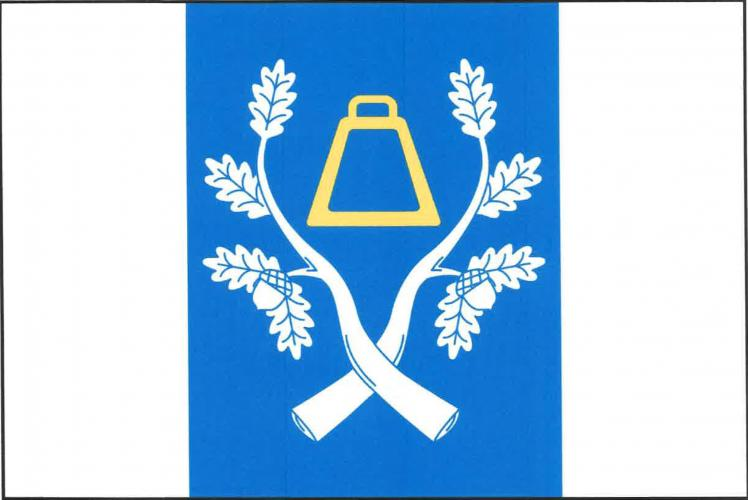
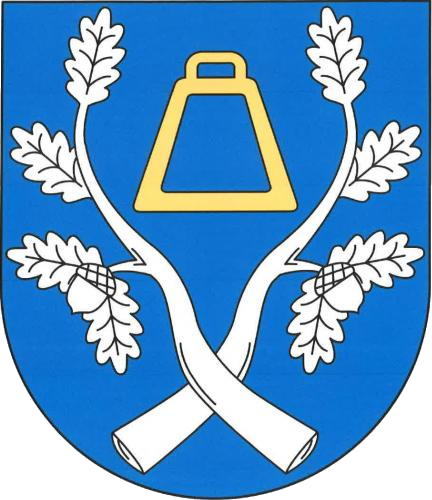
- Flag Coat of arms

- Location in the Czech Republic
- Coordinates: 50°20′0″N 15°40′41″E
- Country: Czech Republic
- Region: Hradec Králové
- District: Jičín
- First mentioned: 1134

Area
  - Total: 2.19 km^{2} (0.85 sq mi)
- Elevation: 284 m (932 ft)

Population (2026-01-01)
  - Total: 100
  - Density: 46/km^{2} (120/sq mi)
- Time zone: UTC+1 (CET)
  - Summer (DST): UTC+2 (CEST)
- Postal code: 508 01
- Website: www.obec-rasin.cz

Rašín is a municipality and village in Jičín District in the Hradec Králové Region of the Czech Republic. It has about 100 inhabitants.

== Etymology ==
The name is derived from the personal name Rácha or Ráša (pet forms of the given name Radoslav), meaning "Rácha's/Ráša's".

== Geography ==
Rašín is located about 25 kilometres (16 mi) southeast of Jičín and 17 km (11 mi) northwest of Hradec Králové. It lies a flat and predominantly agricultural landscape in the East Elbe Table. The highest point is at 303 m (994 ft) above sea level.

In the southern part of the municipality is a forest, protected as a nature monument. The Kazatelna Nature Monument has an area of 69.0 ha (171 acres) and the reason for protection is the occurrence of protected and endangered plant species.

== History ==
The first written mention of Rašín is from 1134, when it was owned by the nobleman Preneš of Hořice. He sold the village to Prague archbishop Jan I, who donated the village to the Strahov Monastery. After Rašín changed owners several times, it was bought by the Lords of Pecka and annexed to the Pecka estate. After the Battle of White Mountain, the village became a part of the Hořice estate.

== Demographics ==
Historical population

Year	Pop.	±%
1869	209	—
1880	200	−4.3%
1890	192	−4.0%
1900	207	+7.8%
1910	208	+0.5%

Year	Pop.	±%
1921	182	−12.5%
1930	181	−0.5%
1950	144	−20.4%
1961	143	−0.7%
1970	106	−25.9%

Year	Pop.	±%
1980	93	−12.3%
1991	73	−21.5%
2001	64	−12.3%
2011	83	+29.7%
2021	108	+30.1%

Source: Censuses

== Transport ==
The railway line Hradec Králové–Turnov runs through the northern part of the municipality, but there is no train station. The municipality is served by the station in neighbouring Jeřice.

== Sights ==
There are no protected cultural monuments in the municipality.
