= Rosin (surname) =

Rosin is a German surname and a Jewish surname. Notable people with the surname include:

- Carol Rosin (born 1944), American educator, author and aerospace executive
- Charles Rosin (born 1952), American screenwriter and television producer
- Daniel Rosin (born 1980), German footballer
- Dave Rosin (born 1981), Canadian musician
- David Rosin (1823–1894), German Jewish theologian
- Hanna Rosin, American journalist
