= Raisin (surname) =

Raisin is a French surname. Notable people with the surname include:

- Agatha Raisin, fictional character
- Catherine Raisin (1855–1945), British geologist
- Jacob S. Raisin (1878–1946), Belarusian-American rabbi
- Max Raisin (1881–1957), Belarusian-American rabbi
- Ross Raisin (born 1979), British novelist
- Saul Raisin (born 1983), American cyclist
