= Andrey Razin =

Andrey or Andrei Razin may refer to:

- Andrey Razin (footballer) (born 1979), Belarusian footballer and coach
- Andrei Razin (ice hockey) (born 1973), Russian ice hockey player
- Andrei Razin (singer) (born 1963), Soviet and Russian musician
- Andrey Razin (sprinter) (born 1962), Soviet sprinter
