= Siege of Pilsen =

1618 battle of the Thirty Years' War

Coordinates: 49.7475°N 13.3776°E

- Part of the Bohemian Revolt (Thirty Years' War)
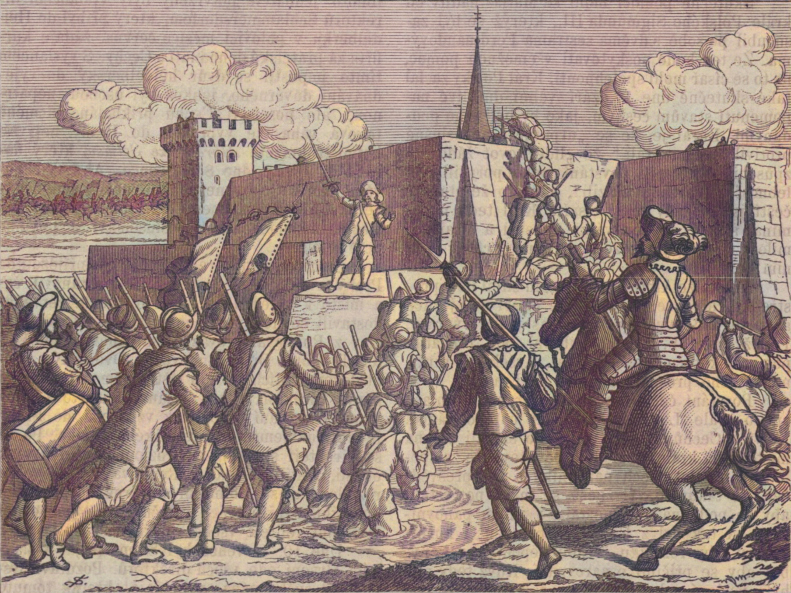
- Bohemian troops storming Pilsen
Date	19 September – 21 November 1618
Location	Pilsen, Bohemia
Result	Bohemian victory

Belligerents
(Kingdom of Bohemia) Bohemia	(Habsburg monarchy) Habsburg Monarchy

Commanders and leaders
Ernst von Mansfeld	Felix Dornheim

Strength
20,000	4,000 Burghers; 158 cavalry

Casualties and losses
1,100	2,500

The Siege of Pilsen, (Note: Also Plzeň or Battle of Pilsen) 19 September to 21 November 1618, was the first significant action of the Thirty Years' War. Following the Bohemian Revolt, a Bohemian army under Ernst von Mansfeld captured Plzeň.

== Background ==
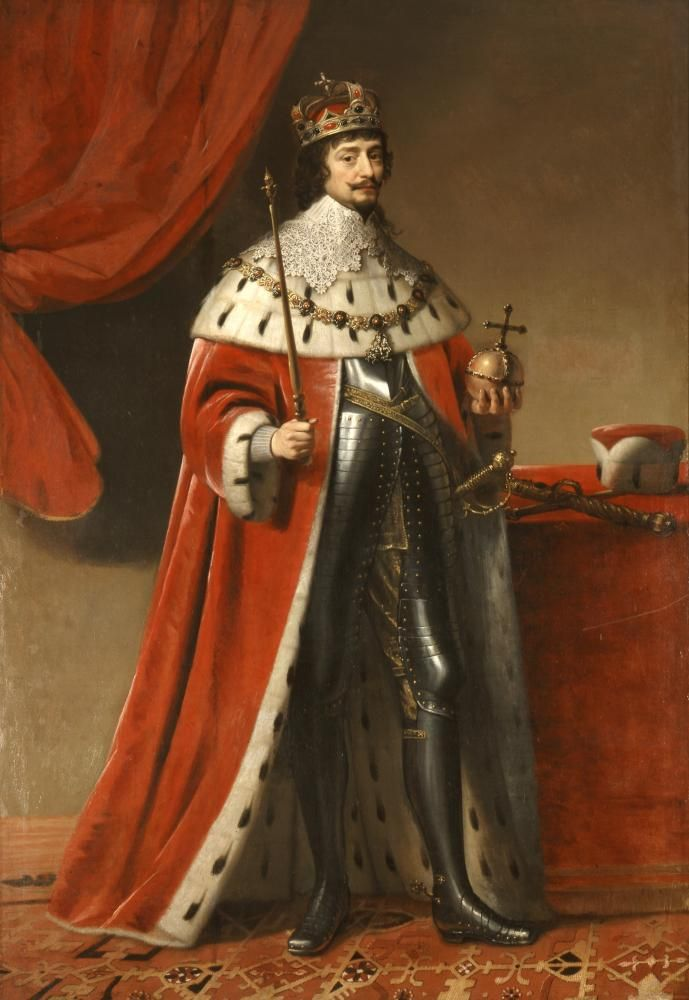
Frederick V of Bohemia, painting from 1634.

On 23 May 1618 the Protestant nobles overthrew the rule of King Ferdinand II and threw the Roman Catholic governors of Bohemia from their office at Prague Castle in the Defenestration of Prague. The new government formed of Protestant nobility and gentry gave Ernst von Mansfeld the command over all of its forces. Meanwhile, Catholic nobles and priests started fleeing the country. Some of the monasteries as well as unfortified manors were evacuated and the Catholic refugees headed for the city of Pilsen, where they thought that a successful defence could be organised. The city was well-prepared for a lengthy siege, but the defences were undermanned and the defenders lacked enough gunpowder for their artillery. Mansfeld decided to capture the city before the Catholics were able to gain support from the outside.

== Siege ==
On 19 September 1618 Mansfeld's army reached the outskirts of the city. The defenders blocked two city gates and the third one was reinforced with additional guards. The Protestant army was too weak to start an all-out assault on the castle, so Mansfeld decided to take the city by hunger. On 2 October the Protestant artillery arrived, but the calibre and number of the cannons was small and the bombardment of the city walls brought little effect. The siege continued, with the Protestants receiving new supplies and recruits on a daily basis, while the defenders lacked food and munitions. Also, the main city well was destroyed and the stores of potable water soon depleted.

Finally, on 21 November, cracks were made in the walls and the Protestant soldiers poured into the city. After several hours of close hand-to-hand combat, all of the town was in Mansfeld's hands.

== Aftermath ==
After capturing the city, Mansfeld demanded 120,000 golden guldens as war reparations and an additional 47,000 florins for sparing the city and not burning it to the ground. [Between the previous and next sentence, two years passed.] However, soon the Holy Roman Empire, led by Bavaria, gathered enough forces and crossed the border with Bohemia, heading towards Pilsen and Prague.

The newly elected Bohemian king, Frederick V of the Palatinate was aware of the huge superiority of his enemies' forces and ordered his own army to regroup and attack each of the advancing armies separately. However, he was abandoned by most of his allies and his armies dispersed in the dense forests between Pilsen and Prague, which resulted in a decisive defeat in the Battle of White Mountain.
