= Rosina (ship) =

Several vessels have been named Rosina:

- Rosina (1796 ship) was launched at Shields in 1796. She became a West Indiaman and foundered in 1806.
- Rosina (1798 ship) was launched at Stockton-on-Tees. A lightning strike in 1809 while she was in a dockyard set fire to her but the fire was put out. She then sailed for at least a decade more.
- Rosina (1803 ship) was launched at Hull in 1803. She almost immediately became a hired armed ship for the British Royal Navy for about a year. After she returned to her owners she became a West Indiaman and then a transport. She was last listed in 1818.
- Rosina (1807 ship) was launched in Norway and was wrecked at Ballyrattan (or Ballycotton) Bay (near Cork) in 1810.
