= Rosina (surname) =

Rosina is a surname. Notable people with the surname include:

- Alessandro Rosina (born 1984), Italian football player
- Štefan Rosina (businessman) (born 1932), Slovak tire maker
- Štefan Rosina (born 1987), Slovak racing driver
