= Róisín O'Donovan =

Irish actress

- Born: 1989 (age 36–37); Dublin
- Occupation: Actress
- Years active: 2011–present

Róisín O'Donovan (born 1989 in Dublin) is an Irish actress.

== Early life ==
O'Donovan was born in Dublin in 1989, and attended the Bow Street Academy for Screen Acting in 2014–2015 before taking a workshop at the Actors Centre in 2017.

== Career ==
She became acting in 2014–2015 and continued in films for several years. In 2021, she directed the short film An Audience with Olivia Colman and in 2022 she acted as Sarah Kelly in Der Irland-Krimi. He also works as an intimacy coordinator for Netflix, Amazon and Disney productions.

== Acting credits ==
=== Film and television ===
Year	Title	Role	Ref.
2014	Get Up and Go	Aline	
2014	Love, Rosie	Midwife	
2015	Positive Discrimination	Short film	
2015	Red Rock	Niamh Reid	
2019	Forever in My Hearth	Katherine	
2019	Vivere	Mary Ann	
2022	Der Irland-Krimi	Sarah Kelly	
2022	Conversations with Friends		
2024	Not Today Not Tomorrow	Short film	

=== Director ===
Year	Title	Role	Notes	Ref.
2021	An Audience with Olivia Colman		Short film	
2025	Moan		Short film	
