= Stenka Razin (disambiguation) =

Stenka Razin (1630–1671) was a Cossack leader.

Stenka Razin may also refer to:

- Stenka Razin (film), the first finished Russian narrative film
- Stenka Razin (Glazunov), a symphonic poem composed by Alexander Glazunov
- The Execution of Stepan Razin, a cantata composed by Dimitri Shostakovich
- Stepan Razin (film), a 1939 Soviet drama film
- Bakıxanov, a settlement and municipality in Baku, Azerbaijan, prior to 1992 known as Stepan Razin
