= Rasin (surname) =

Rasin is a surname. Notable people with the surname include:

- Bengt Rasin (1922–2013), Swedish Navy officer
- Isaac Freeman Rasin (1833–1907), American politician

== See also ==
- Razin (disambiguation)
- Alois Rašín, Czech politician and economist
