= Rosina Schnorr =

German business person

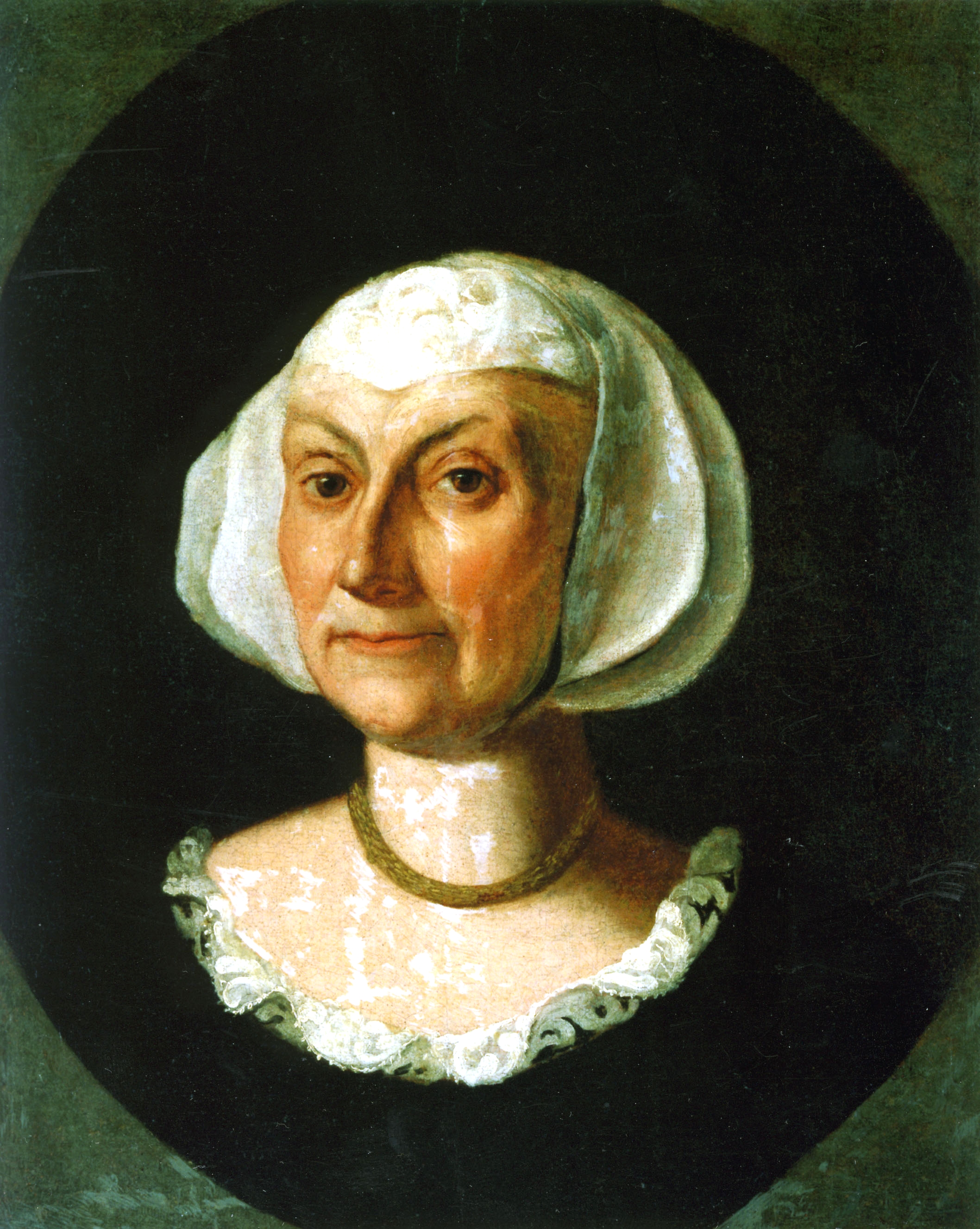
Rosina Schnorr

Rosina Schnorr (7 October 1618 – November 11, 1679), was a German business person.

She was married to the merchant Hans Veit Schnorr, who managed the textile coloring factory in Niederpfannenstiel and Auernhammer. After the death of her spouse in 1664, she took over his business. She also expanded in to the mining industry. She was active as a philanthropist, and founded an orphanage in Schneeberg. Schnorr is regarded to be a notable example of a female business person in the 17th century. In 2013, she was commemorated in the city of Aue in Germany.
