= 1672 =

1672 in various calendars
- Gregorian calendar: 1672; MDCLXXII
- Ab urbe condita: 2425
- Armenian calendar: 1121; ԹՎ ՌՃԻԱ
- Assyrian calendar: 6422
- Balinese saka calendar: 1593–1594
- Bengali calendar: 1078–1079
- Berber calendar: 2622
- English Regnal year: 23 Cha. 2 – 24 Cha. 2
- Buddhist calendar: 2216
- Burmese calendar: 1034
- Byzantine calendar: 7180–7181
- Chinese calendar: 辛亥年 (Metal Pig); 4369 or 4162 — to — 壬子年 (Water Rat); 4370 or 4163
- Coptic calendar: 1388–1389
- Discordian calendar: 2838
- Ethiopian calendar: 1664–1665
- Hebrew calendar: 5432–5433
- Hindu calendars
- Vikram Samvat: 1728–1729
- Shaka Samvat: 1593–1594
- Kali Yuga: 4772–4773
- Holocene calendar: 11672
- Igbo calendar: 672–673
- Iranian calendar: 1050–1051
- Islamic calendar: 1082–1083
- Japanese calendar: Kanbun 12 (寛文１２年)
- Javanese calendar: 1594–1595
- Julian calendar: Gregorian minus 10 days
- Korean calendar: 4005
- Minguo calendar: 240 before ROC 民前240年
- Nanakshahi calendar: 204
- Thai solar calendar: 2214–2215
- Tibetan calendar: ལྕགས་མོ་ཕག་ལོ་ (female Iron-Boar); 1798 or 1417 or 645 — to — ཆུ་ཕོ་བྱི་བ་ལོ་ (male Water-Rat); 1799 or 1418 or 646

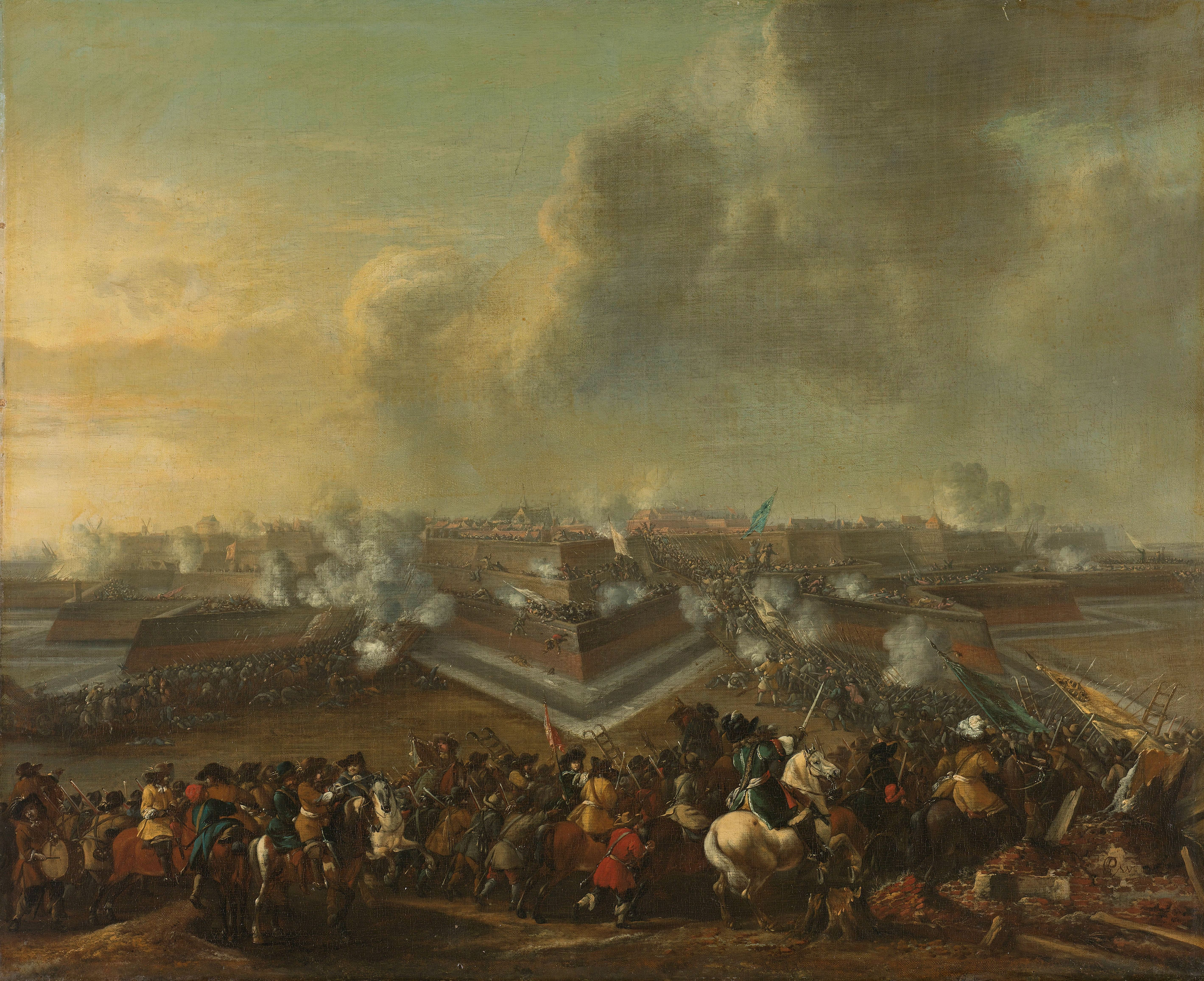
December 30: The Dutch Republic retakes Coevorden from the French Army after a string of losses, closing out the year of disaster, the "Rampjaar".

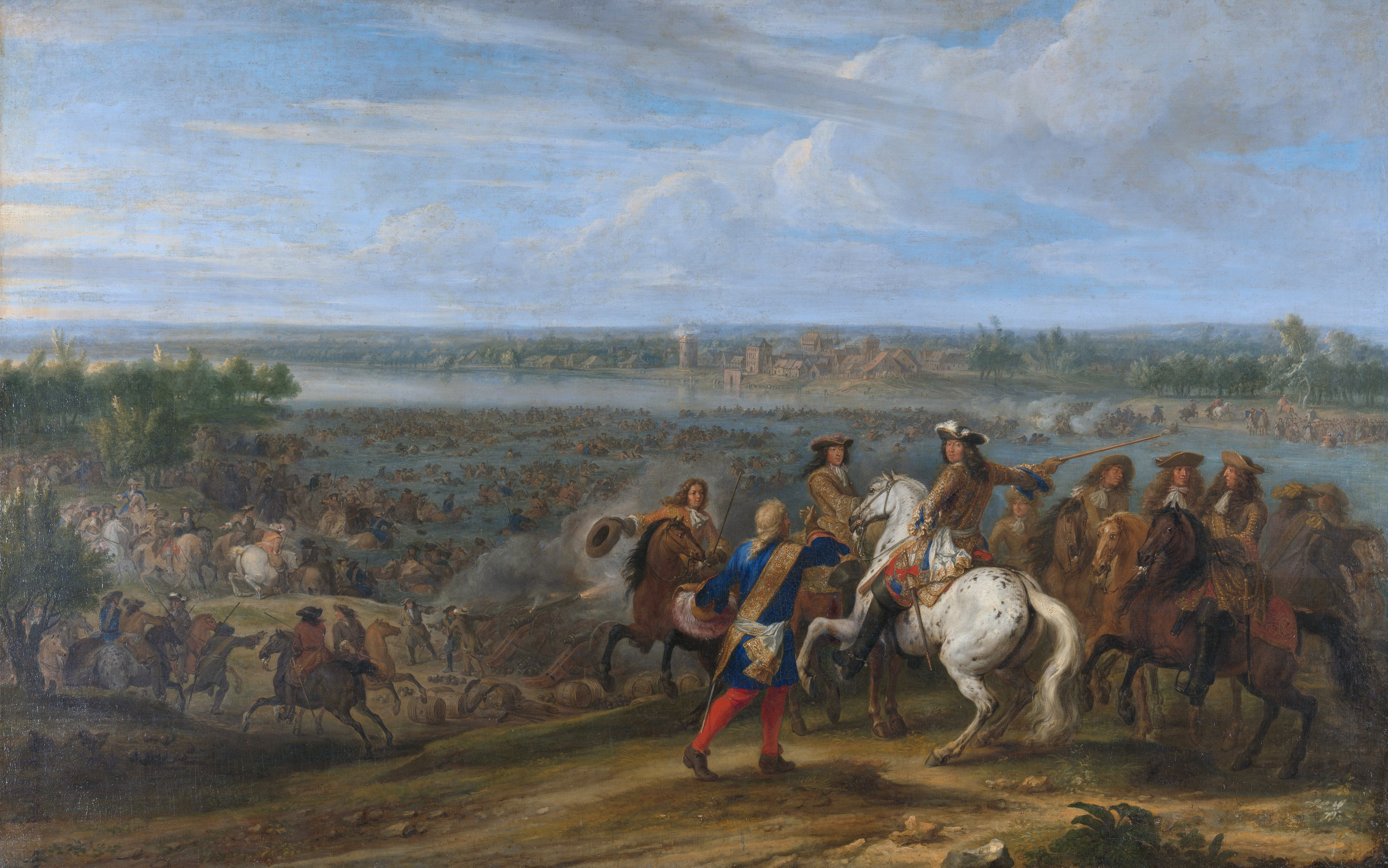
June 12: King Louis XIV crosses the Rhine at Lobith.

1672 (MDCLXXII) was a leap year starting on Friday of the Gregorian calendar and a leap year starting on Monday of the Julian calendar, the 1672nd year of the Common Era (CE) and Anno Domini (AD) designations, the 672nd year of the 2nd millennium, the 72nd year of the 17th century, and the 3rd year of the 1670s decade. As of the start of 1672, the Gregorian calendar was 10 days ahead of the Julian calendar, which remained in localized use until 1923.

== Events ==
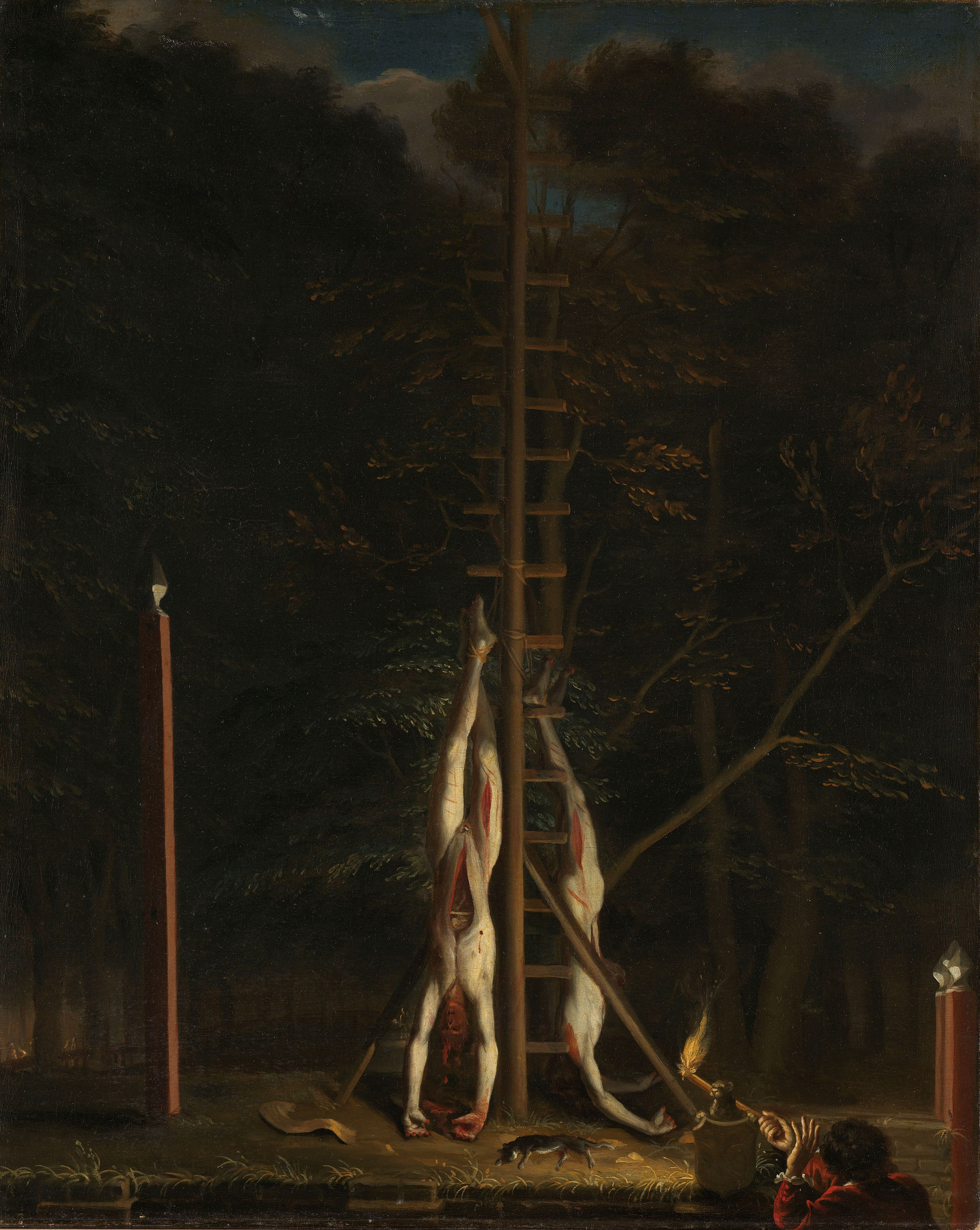
August 20: Cornelis and Johan de Witt are killed by a mob in The Hague.

=== January–March ===
- January 2 – After the government of England is unable to pay the nation's debts, King Charles II decrees the Stop of the Exchequer, the suspension of payments for one year "upon any warrant, securities or orders, whether registered or not registered therein, and payable within that time, excepting only such payments as shall grow due upon orders on the subsidy, according to the Act of Parliament, and orders and securities upon the fee farm rents, both which are to be proceeded upon as if such a stop had never been made." The money saved by not paying debts is redirected toward the expenses of the upcoming war with the Dutch Republic, but the effect is for the halt by banks for extending further credit to the Crown. Before the end of the year, the suspension of payments is extended from December 31 to May 31, and then to January 31, 1674.
- January 11 – The Royal Society of London for Improving Natural Knowledge, national science academy for England, elects Isaac Newton to its membership, and then demonstrates Newton's reflecting telescope to King Charles II.
- January 13 – Pope Clement X issues regulations for the prerequisites of removing relics of Roman Catholic saints from sacred cemeteries, requiring advance approval from the Cardinal Vicar in Rome before the remains of the saint can be allowed for view. The Cardinal Vicar is directed to bar regular persons from viewing remains, and to limit inspection to high prelates and to princes.
- January 25 – The Theatre Royal, located at the time on Bridges Street in London, burns down. A replacement structure is built on Drury Lane in 1674.
- February 16 (February 6, 1671 O.S.) – Isaac Newton sends a paper for publication regarding his experiments on the refraction of light through glass prisms and makes the first identification of the "primary colors" of visible light on the electromagnetic spectrum, reporting that "The Original or primary colours are, Red, Yellow, Green, Blew, and a Violet-purple, together with Orange, Indico, and an indefinite variety of Intermediate gradations."
- February 25 – Willem, Prince of Orange, the 21-year-old Stadtholder of Gelderland and Utrecht, is approved by the States General of the Dutch Republic to command the Dutch States Army for the impending war with England.
- March 12 – Action of 12 March 1672, a 2-day naval engagement between an English coastal patrol and a Dutch Smyrna convoy off the south coast of England. The English fleet suffers severe damage while most of the Dutch convoy escapes, although one of the Dutch commanders (De Haaze) is killed and one warship taken as a prize (Klein Hollandia) sinks; the latter will be rediscovered in 2019.
- March 15 – Charles II of England issues the Royal Declaration of Indulgence, suspending execution of Penal Laws against Protestant nonconformists and Roman Catholics in his realms; this will be withdrawn the following year under pressure from the Parliament of England.
- March 16 – At the Synod of Jerusalem, presided over by Dositheos II of Jerusalem, the 68 bishops and representatives from the whole of Eastern Orthodox Christendom close by approving the Orthodox dogma against the challenge of Protestantism, declaring against "the falsehoods of the adversaries which they have devised against the Eastern Church" and making a goal of "reformation of their innovations and for their return to the catholic and apostolic church in which their forefathers also were."
- March 17 – The Third Anglo-Dutch War begins as the Kingdom of England declares war on the Dutch Republic.

=== April–June ===
- April 8 – France declares war on the Dutch Republic, invading the country on April 29.
- May 2 – John Maitland becomes Duke of Lauderdale and Earl of March.
- June 1 – Münster and Cologne begin their invasion of the Dutch Republic; hence 1672 becomes known as het rampjaar ("the disaster year") in the Netherlands.
- June 7 – Third Anglo-Dutch War – Battle of Solebay: An indecisive sea battle results, between the Dutch Republic, and the joined forces of England and France.
- June 12 – Battle of Tolhuis: French forces under King Louis XIV cross the Rhine into the Netherlands; the city of Utrecht is occupied by the French Army.

=== July–September ===
- July 4 – William III of Orange is appointed Stadtholder of Holland and Zeeland.
- August 20 – Johan de Witt, Grand Pensionary of Holland and his brother Cornelis de Witt are killed by an Orangist mob in The Hague.
- September 10 – William III of Orange, Stadtholder of the Dutch Republic, dismisses nine of the regenten who lead cities in the Netherlands, after being granted authority by the States-General.
- September 15 – In India, Admiral Mai Nayak Bhandari of the Maratha Empire captures the island of Khanderi.
- September 16 – The Board of Trade is created in England by a merger of the Council of Trade and the Council of Foreign Plantations, both of which had been created by King Charles II in 1660, under the name The Board of Trade and Plantations. The Earl of Shaftesbury is appointed as the first Lord of Trade, administering the Board until its dissolution in 1676.
- September 26 – General Raimondo Montecuccoli, commander of the army of the Holy Roman Empire, joins forces with the Brandenburg troops commanded by Frederick William, Elector of Brandenburg and the two groups assemble at Halberstadt, to attack the French and the bishops of Münster and Cologne.

=== October–December ===
- October 2 – Manuel de Cendoya, Spain's Governor of Florida, breaks ground for the construction of the Castillo de San Marcos, a masonry fortress designed to protect St. Augustine. Governor Cendoya follows on November 9 with the ceremonial laying for the first stone for the foundation.
- October 18 – The Treaty of Buchach, between the Ottoman Empire and the Polish–Lithuanian Commonwealth, is signed.
- November 24 – Five-year-old Sikandar Adil Shah is enthroned as the last Sultan of Bijapur (located in southwestern India in what is now the Karnataka state) upon the death of his father, the Sultan Ali Adil Shah II. In 1686, the sultanate of Bijapur is conquered and annexed by the Mughal Empire.
- November 28 – After more than five years of administration of the Treasury of England by a five-member commission, Lord Clifford of Chudleigh, one of the commission members, becomes the Lord High Treasurer of England.
- December 18
  - Hedwig Eleonora of Holstein-Gottorp ends her regency of the Swedish Empire after more than 12 years, having exercised power in the name of her minor son, Charles XI, since the death of her husband Karl X Gustav in 1660. Hedwig Eleonora had served as the chair of the six-member Regency Council.
  - An English invasion force captures the Caribbean island of Tobago from Dutch colonists and destroys the settlement.
- December 23 – French astronomer Giovanni Domenico Cassini discovers Rhea, a previously-unknown satellite of the planet Saturn. Rhea is the second-largest overall, and the third moon of Saturn to be discovered by Earth astronomers, Titan having been found by Christiaan Huygens on March 25, 1655 and Iapetus by Cassini on October 25, 1671.
- December 30 – Troops of the Dutch Republic, under the command of Carl von Rabenhaupt, are able to reclaim lost territory for the first time in the Third Anglo-Dutch War, liberating Coevorden, which had been forced to surrender to France on July 1. The moment, a boost for morale in what is remembered in Dutch history as the Rampjaar (the "Disaster Year"), is later memorialized in a painting by Pieter Wouwerman, The Storming of Coevorden.

=== Undated ===
- Richard Hoare becomes a partner in the London goldsmith's business which, as private banking house C. Hoare & Co., will survive through to the 21st century.
- Foundation of the Chorina Comedy, the first theater in Russia.

== Births ==
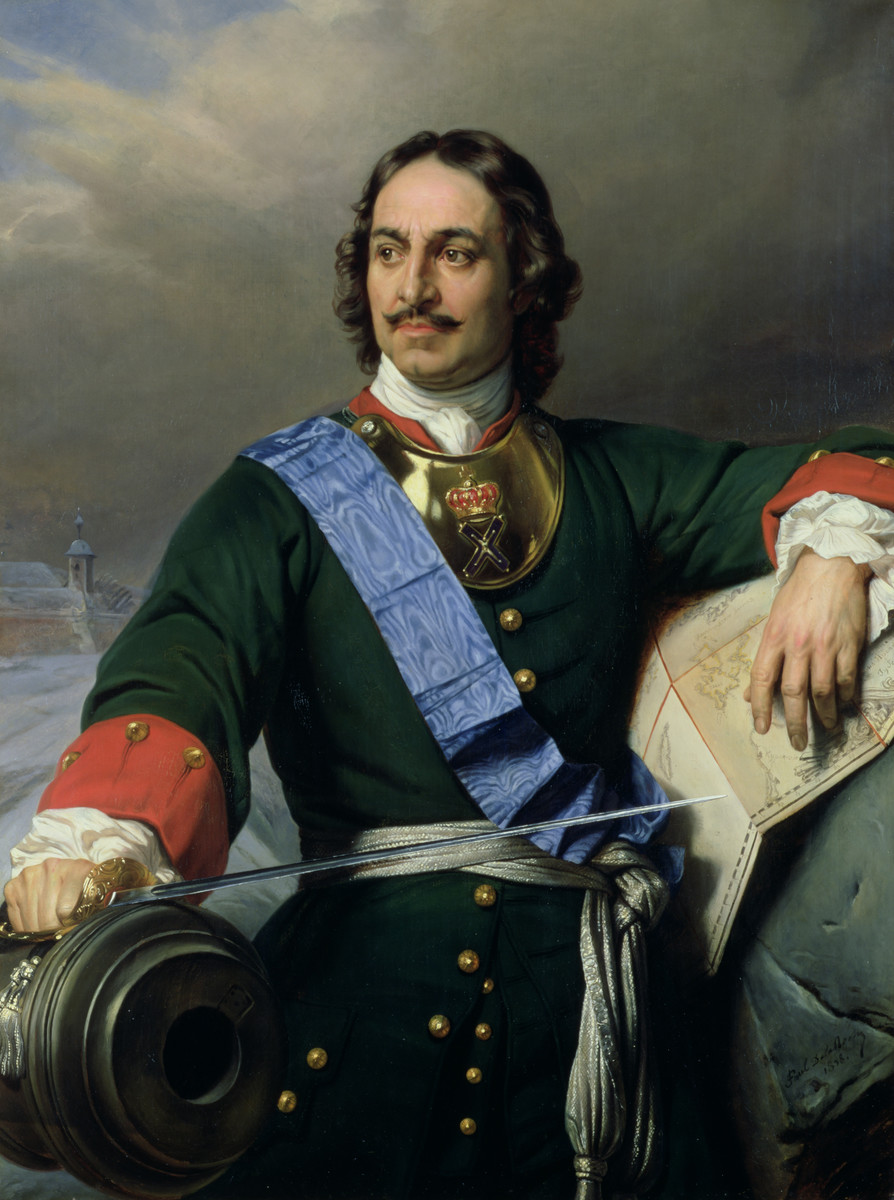
Peter the Great

- January 4 – Hugh Boulter, Irish Archbishop of Armagh (d. 1742)
- January 18 – Antoine Houdar de la Motte, French writer (d. 1731)
- February 13 – Étienne François Geoffroy, French chemist (d. 1731)
- February 26 – Antoine Augustine Calmet, French theologian (d. 1757)
- May 1 – Joseph Addison, English politician and writer (d. 1719)
- June 9 – Emperor Peter the Great of Russia (d. 1725)
- June 11 – Francesco Antonio Bonporti, Italian priest and composer (d. 1749)
- July 13 – Nicolás Salzillo, Spanish artist (d. 1727)
- August 2 – Johann Jakob Scheuchzer, Swiss scholar (d. 1733)
- September 8 – Nicolas de Grigny, French organist and composer (d. 1703)
- October 11 – Pylyp Orlyk, Ukrainian Zaporozhian Cossack starshina, diplomat (d. 1742)
- October 21 – Ludovico Antonio Muratori, Italian historian, scholar (d. 1750)
- October 27 – Maria Gustava Gyllenstierna, Swedish writer (d. 1737)
- date unknown
  - Ann Baynard, English natural philosopher (d. 1697)
  - José Antonio Nebra Mezquita, Spanish organist and harpist (d. 1748)

== Deaths ==
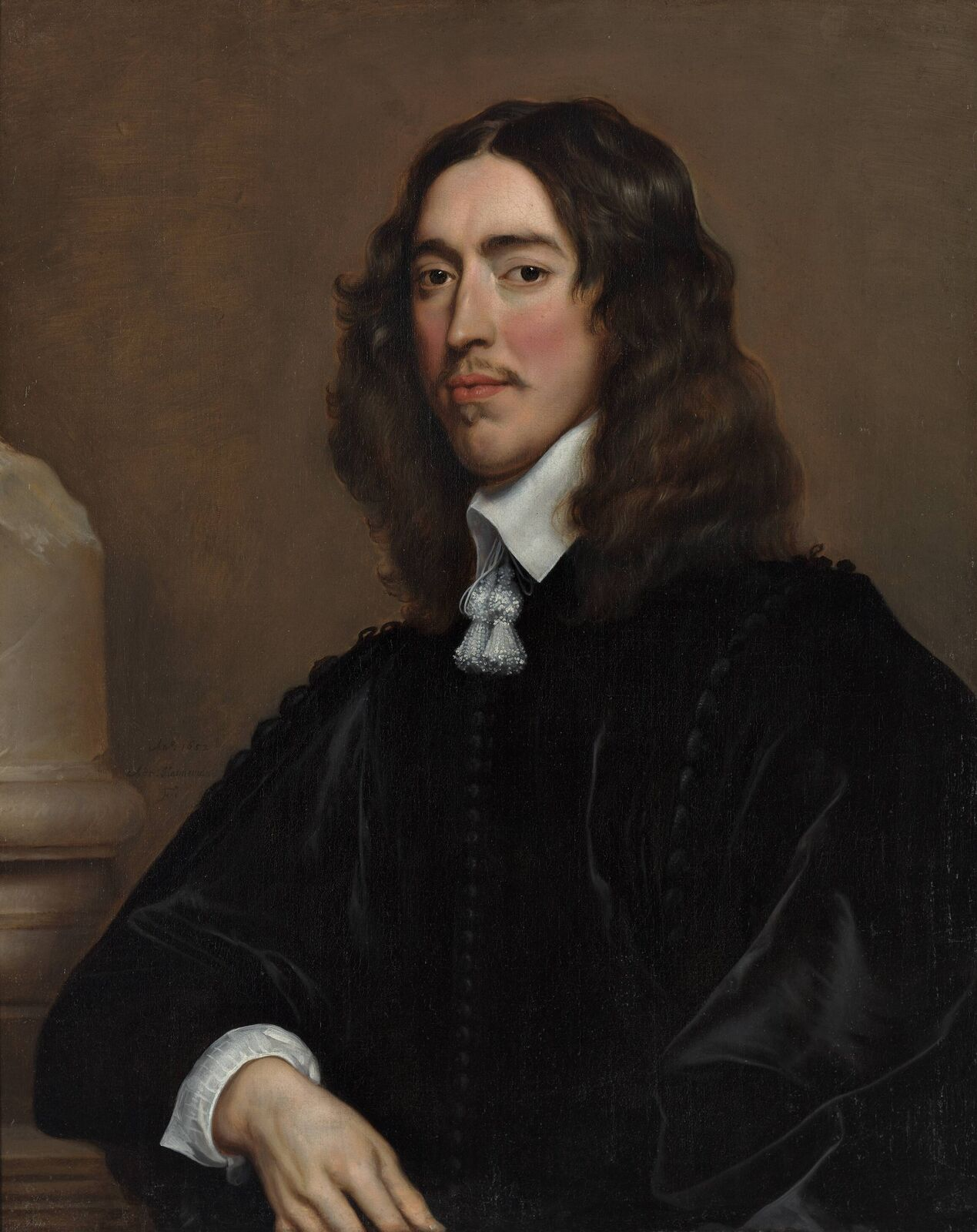
Johan de Witt

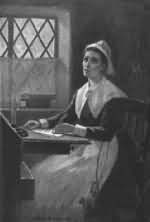
Anne Bradstreet

- January – Denis Gaultier, French lutenist and composer (b. 1603)
- January 15 – John Cosin, English clergyman (b. 1594)
- January 21 – Adriaen van de Velde, Dutch painter (b. 1636)
- January 28 – Pierre Séguier, Chancellor of France (b. 1588)
- February 17 – Madeleine Béjart, French actress and theatre director (b. 1618)
- February 19 – Charles Chauncy, English-born president of Harvard College (b. 1592)
- February 28
  - Christian, Duke of Brieg, Duke of Legnica (1663–1672) and Brieg (1664–1672) (b. 1618)
  - Sir Ralph Hare, 1st Baronet, English politician (b. 1623)
- March – Archibald Armstrong, court jester to James VI and I and Charles I of England
- March 4 – Luis Guillermo de Moncada, 7th Duke of Montalto, Spanish Catholic cardinal (b. 1614)
- March 8 – Thomas Tyrrell, English judge and politician (b. 1594)
- March 18 – Agneta Horn, Swedish writer (b. 1629)
- April 2
  - Pedro Calungsod, Filipino saint (b. 1654)
  - Diego Luis de San Vitores, Spanish Jesuit missionary to Guam (b. 1627)
- April 4 – Henry Ernest, Count of Stolberg (b. 1593)
- April 13 – Marguerite of Lorraine, princess of Lorraine, duchess of Orléans (b. 1615)
- April 14
  - Friedrich Wilhelm III, Duke of Saxe-Altenburg (b. 1657)
  - King Pye Min of Burma (b. 1619)
- April 17 – Gryzelda Konstancja Zamoyska, Polish noble (b. 1623)
- April 21 – Antoine Godeau, French bishop and poet (b. 1605)
- April 22 – Georg Stiernhielm, Swedish poet (b. 1598)
- April 26 – Lionel Lockyer, English alchemist, quack doctor (b. 1600)
- April 30 – Marie of the Incarnation, French foundress of the Ursuline Monastery in Quebec (b. 1599)
- May 5 – Samuel Cooper, English painter (b. 1609)
- May 8 – Jean-Armand du Peyrer, Comte de Tréville and French Officer (b. 1598)
- May 11 – Charles Seton, 2nd Earl of Dunfermline, English royalist (b. 1615)
- May 28
  - Frescheville Holles, English Member of Parliament (b. 1642)
  - Edward Montagu, 1st Earl of Sandwich (b. 1625)
  - John Trevor, Welsh politician (b. 1626)
- June 7 – Willem Joseph van Ghent, Dutch admiral (b. 1626)
- June 14 – Matthew Wren, English politician (b. 1629)
- June 17 – Orazio Benevoli, Italian composer (b. 1605)
- June 27 – Roger Twysden, English antiquarian and royalist (b. 1597)
- July 3 – Francis Willughby, English biologist (b. 1635)
- July 21 – Captain John Underhill, English settler and soldier (b. 1597)
- August 2 – Amable de Bourzeys, French writer and academic (b. 1606)
- August 8 – Sir John Borlase, 1st Baronet, English politician (b. 1619)
- August 20
  - Johan de Witt, Dutch politician (b. 1625)
  - Cornelis de Witt, Dutch politician (b. 1623)
- September 9 – François-Joseph Bressani, Italian missionary (b. 1612)
- September 12 – Tanneguy Lefebvre, French classical scholar (b. 1615)
- September 14 – Henri Charles de La Trémoille, son of Henry de La Trémoille (b. 1620)
- September 16 – Anne Bradstreet, American colonial writer (b. c. 1612)
- October 8 – Johan Nieuhof, Dutch traveler who wrote about his journeys to Brazil (b. 1618)
- October 24 – John Webb, English architect (b. 1611)
- November 4 – Lucas van Uden, Dutch painter (b. 1595)
- November 6 – Heinrich Schütz, German composer (b. 1585)
- November 16 – Esaias Boursse, Dutch painter (b. 1631)
- November 19
  - Franciscus Sylvius, Dutch physician and scientist (b. 1614)
  - John Wilkins, English Bishop of Chester (b. 1614)
- December 6
  - King John II Casimir of Poland (b. 1609)
  - Pedro Antonio Fernández de Castro, 10th Count of Lemos, Viceroy of Peru (b. 1632)
- December 7 – Richard Bellingham, Massachusetts colonial magistrate (b. 1592)
- December 8 – Johann Christian von Boyneburg, German politician (b. 1622)
- December 19 – Dorothea Diana of Salm, German noblewoman (b. 1604)
- December 21 – Charles Stanley, 8th Earl of Derby, English noble (b. 1628)
- December 27 – Jacques Rohault, French philosopher (b. 1618)
- December 30 – Hendrick Bloemaert, Dutch painter (b. 1601)
