= Mai Nayak Bhandari =

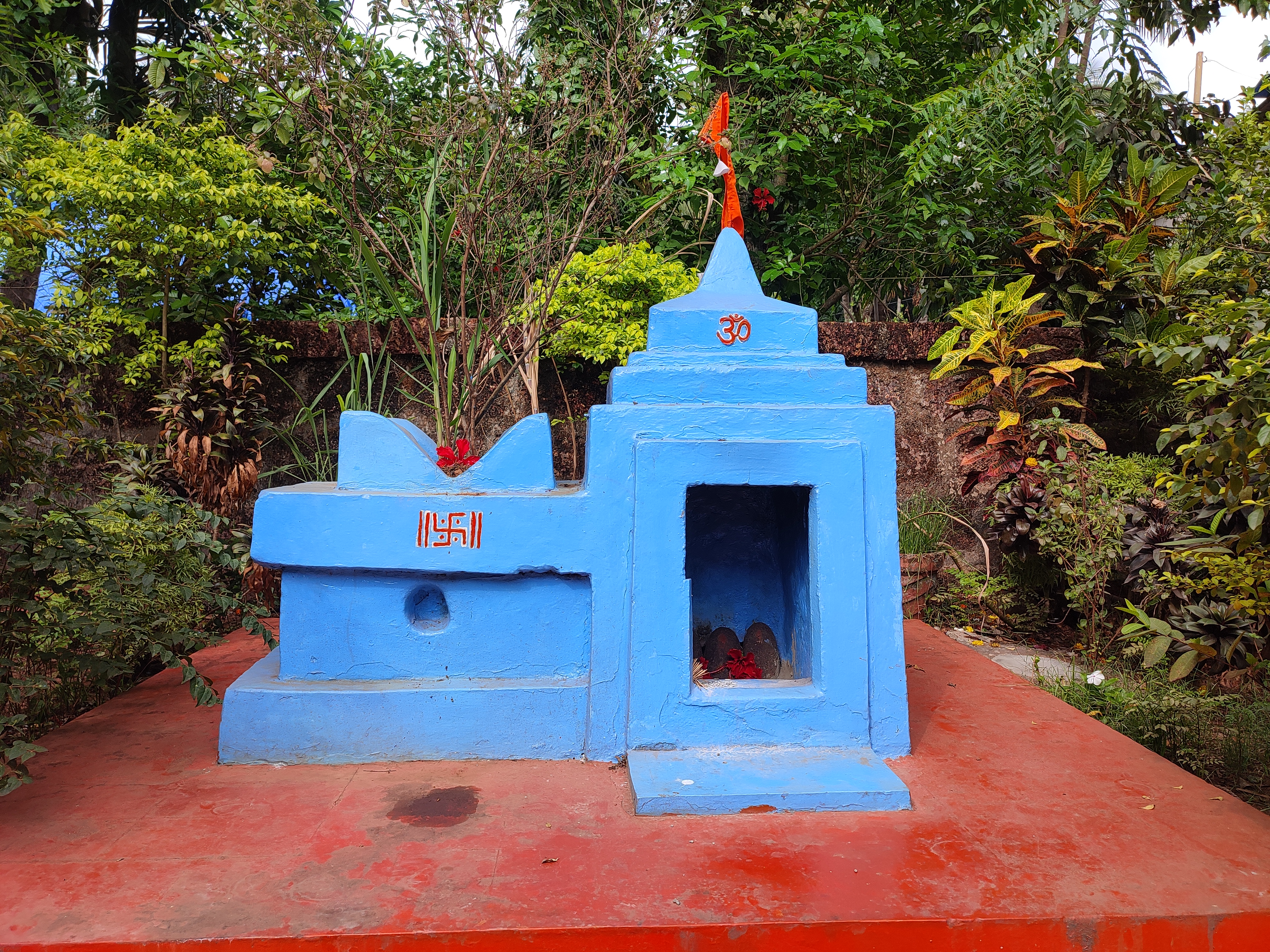
Samadhi of Mayaji Bhatkar (Mainak Bhandari), Bhatye village, Ratnagiri

May Nak was a Bhandari caste admiral in the navy of Chhatrapati Shivaji, and helped to lead the formation of the Maratha Empire. Along with Daria Sarang, another admiral who served Maharaj, Bhandari commanded a naval fleet of 200 ships. Their official titles of Mai Nayak Bhandari and Daria Sarang translate to Water Leader and Sea Captain, respectively. The Maratha Navy was the forerunner of India's present-day Coast Guard. A memorial has been built to Ram Nayak Bhandari at Bhatye Village, close to Ratnagiri town.

== Shivaji's naval conquests ==
In April 1672, Shivaji had an eye upon the rocky Islands of Underi and Khanderi, two sister islands about 11 miles south of Bombay and 30 miles north of Janjira. They were also known as Hennery and Kennery, respectively. On 15 September 1672, a group of 150 warriors under Mai Nayak sailed towards Khanderi. The Deputy Governor of Bombay, under British rule, asked Mai Nayak to leave the island alone, as it belonged to Bombay. However, the Maratha fleet paid no heed to the English demand. The English decided to invite the help of the fleet under Daulat Khan to oppose the Maratha fleet, if it tried to protect the fortifications. Both the English and the Siddhi fleets appeared there to prevent the takeover by the Marathas, and Shivaji stopped the fortification.

But, later on, in August 1679, Shivaji renewed the project, and commenced fortifying the island of Khanderi. By 15 September, his admiral, known as the Mai Nayak, took possession of the Khanderi island with four small guns. However, a sea-battle was fought on 18 October 1679 between Shivaji's fleet and the English fleet; with the assistance of Siddhi Johar, the English were successful in bombarding Khanderi. It was the British view that Shivaji's occupation would hamper the Portuguese presence in Bassein.

== See also ==
- Shivaji
- Bhandaris
