= Daulat Khan =

Daulat Khan may refer to following individuals:

- Daulat Khan Lodi, 16th century noble in the Delhi Sultanate
- Daulat Khan Mayi, 17th century noble in the Mughal Empire
- Daulat Khan (admiral), 17th century admiral in the Maratha Empire
- Daulat Khan (squash player), Pakistani squash player
