= Daulat Khan (admiral) =

Admiral in Maratha Navy

- Shrimant Sarkhel

Sarkhel of Maratha Empire
- Reign: 1657–?
- Predecessor: Position Established
- Successor: Kanhoji Angre
- Allegiance: Maratha Empire
- Monarch: Shivaji (1657–1680); Sambhaji (1680–?)
- Occupation: Naval Admiral
- Military career
- Conflicts: Battles of Janjira; Naval Battle of Satavali; The Khanderi Campaign; Battle of Mumbai

Daulat Khan was the first Naval Admiral or Subhedar of Maratha Navy alongside Maynak Bhandari. Under Shivaji he took part in various Naval expeditions and safeguarded the coast of Maratha Empire.

Under the leadership of Daulat Khan, Marathas won their naval battle against the Portuguese at Satavali in 1659. Alongside Maynak Bhandari he was a leading commander in the Khanderi Campaign of Shivaji. He also battled with the Siddis in 1680 at Mumbai under the reign of Shivaji. After Shivaji's death he continued to serve his son Sambhaji.

== Military career ==
=== Naval battle of Satavali ===
In a letter from Raigad to the Deputy Governor of Mumbai dated April 4, 1674, Narayan Shenvi described how Siddi Sambul's forces and those of Daulat Khan met in battle on the Satavli River. Reports indicated that Siddi Sambul sustained over 100 men in his ranks, Daulat Khan - 44, but was the winner in spite of an arrow injury. After the battle, he retreated to Harihareshwar.

=== Naval battle of Khanderi ===
In April 1672, Chhatrapati Shivaji Maharaj had initially attempted to fortify the island of Khanderi, work was slow however and in September a combined English and Mughal fleet arrived forcing both Daulat Khan and fellow admiral Mai Nayak to withdraw as they were outnumbered and outgunned by the combined fleet.

Seven years later, in 1679, Chhatrapati Shivaji Maharaj sent 300 soldiers and 300 labourers to Khanderi, when the English heard of this they then claimed the island as part of Bombay, the Portuguese in turn claimed it as an old settlement.

Two attempts to turn out the Maratha's failed; and even after a naval battle in which the British fleet of eight ships put to flight 50 sail, the English were not able to prevent the Maratha's strengthening their forces on Khanderi. The Siddi, as Mughal admiral, joined the English with a strong fleet; but the English commander found that the Siddi did not mean to give up the island if he took it, and held aloof. The Siddi continued to batter Khanderi and then suddenly fortified Underi.

Daulat Khan, Chhatrapati Shivaji Maharaj's admiral, tried to stop this, bringing guns on the mainland opposite. But he was defeated and severely wounded, his small open boats not being able to stand against the Siddi's stronger and larger vessels. For several years after this there were constant struggles between the Siddi and the Maratha's for the possession of these islands.

=== Naval battle of Underi ===
After working with the English for some time in blockading Khanderi, where Daulat Khan (Chhatrapati Shivaji Maharaj's admiral) had established himself, Sidi Kasim suddenly took possession of Underi in January, 1680, and began to fortify it. Two engagements followed between the Siddi and the Maratha's. In the second fight Daulat Khan brought guns to bear from the mainland on Underi. After about a fortnight, Daulat Khan again came out with his whole fleet and engaged the Siddi for four hours, but lost heavily. On August 1, 1680, Chhatrapati Sambhaji Maharaj, who had succeeded Chhatrapati Shivaji Maharaj (April, 1680), taking advantage of a dark night, landed two hundred men on Underi. They got within the works before they were discovered; but here the Siddi attacked them and either took or killed the greater number.

== In popular culture ==
=== Films and television ===
- He was portrayed by Suraj Khan in 2024 Indian Marathi-language film Dharmarakshak Mahaveer Chhatrapati Sambhaji Maharaj.

== See also ==
- Yesaji Angre
- Laya Patil
