= Maratha Military Landscapes of India =

World Heritage Site in India

UNESCO World Heritage Site
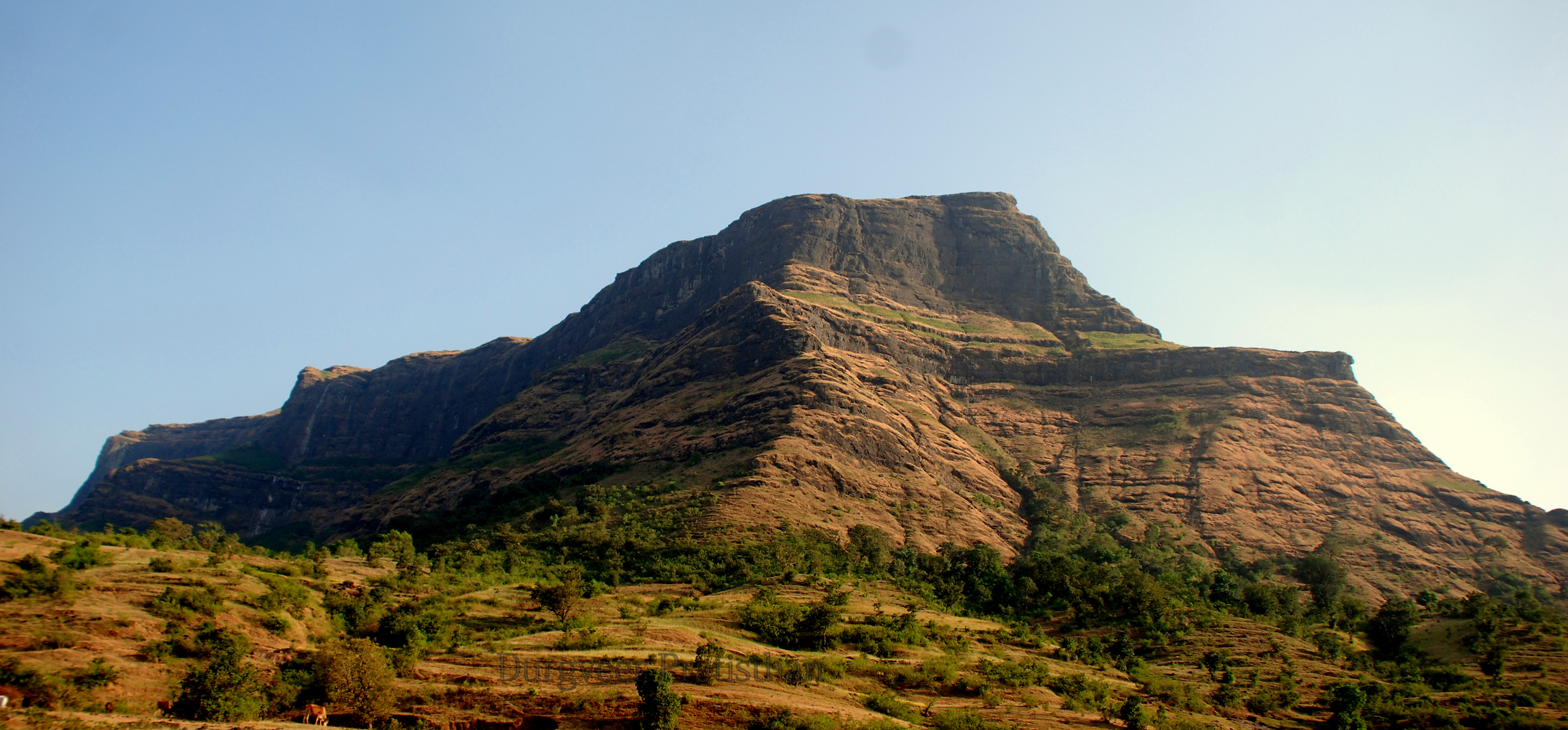
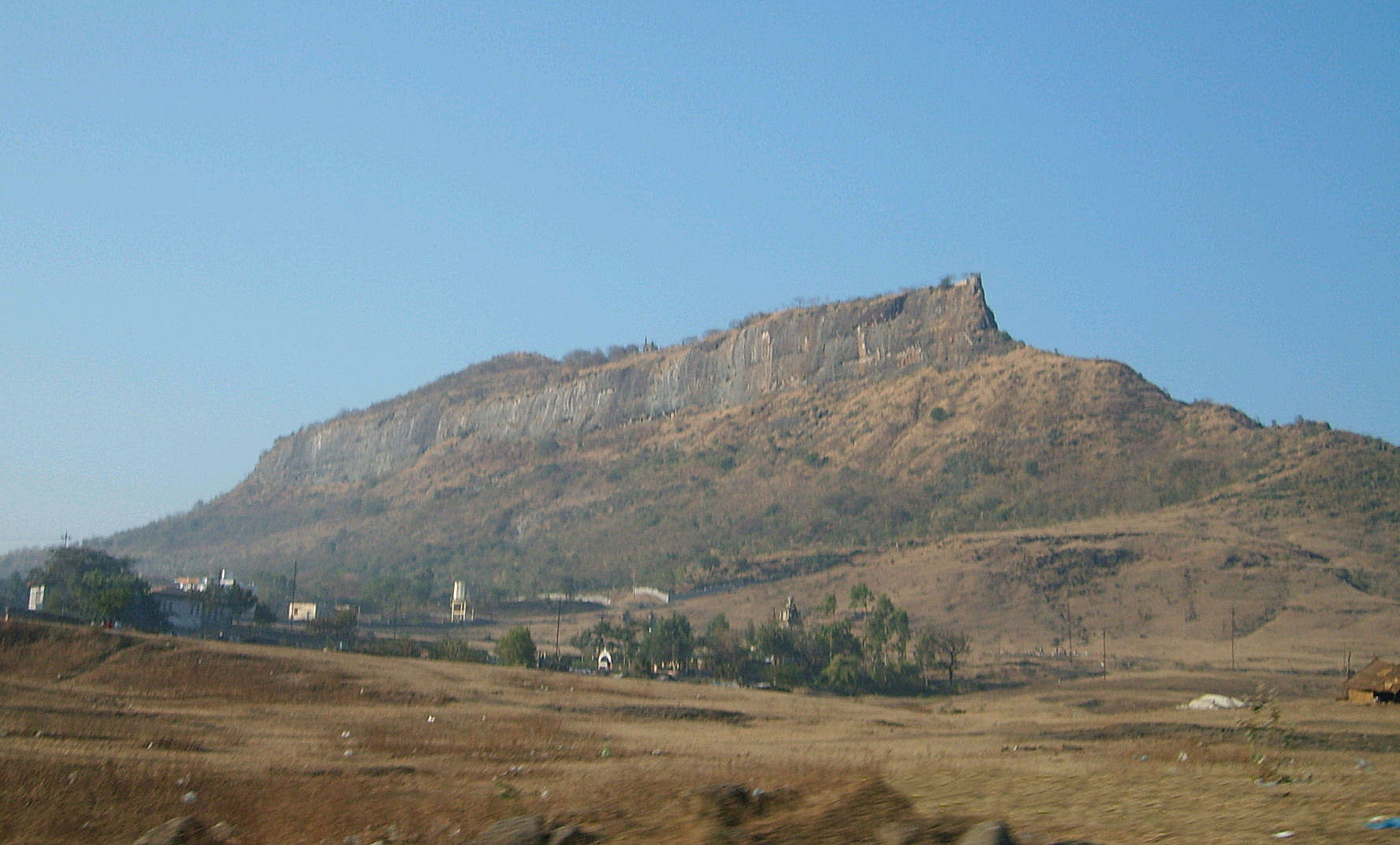
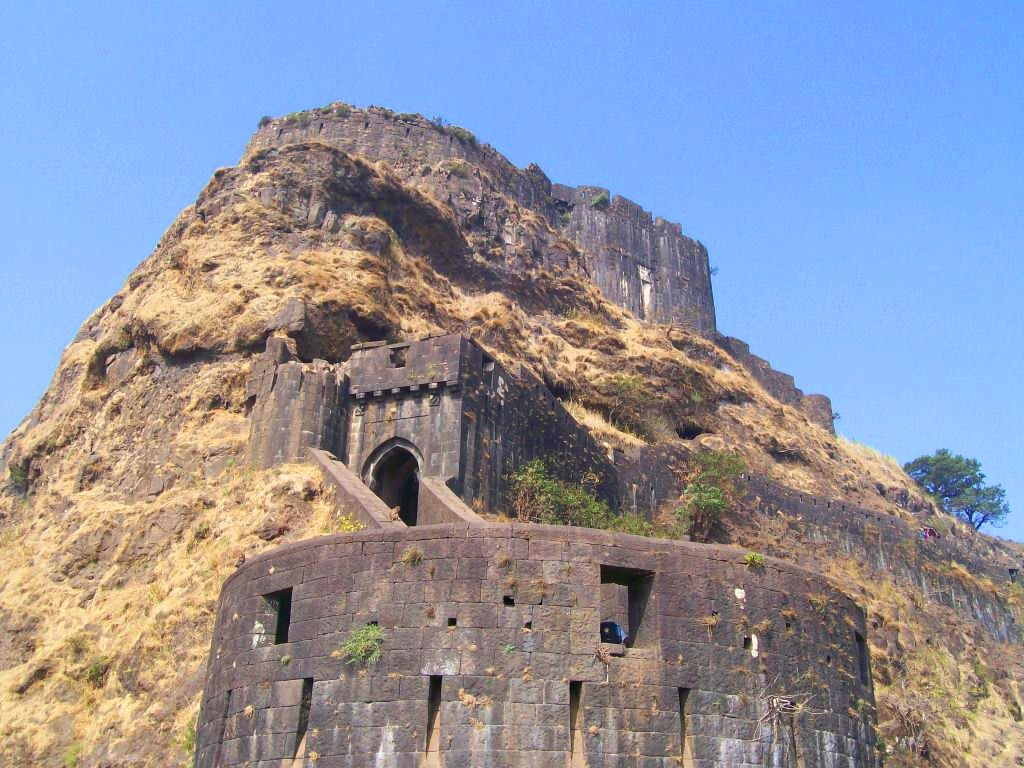
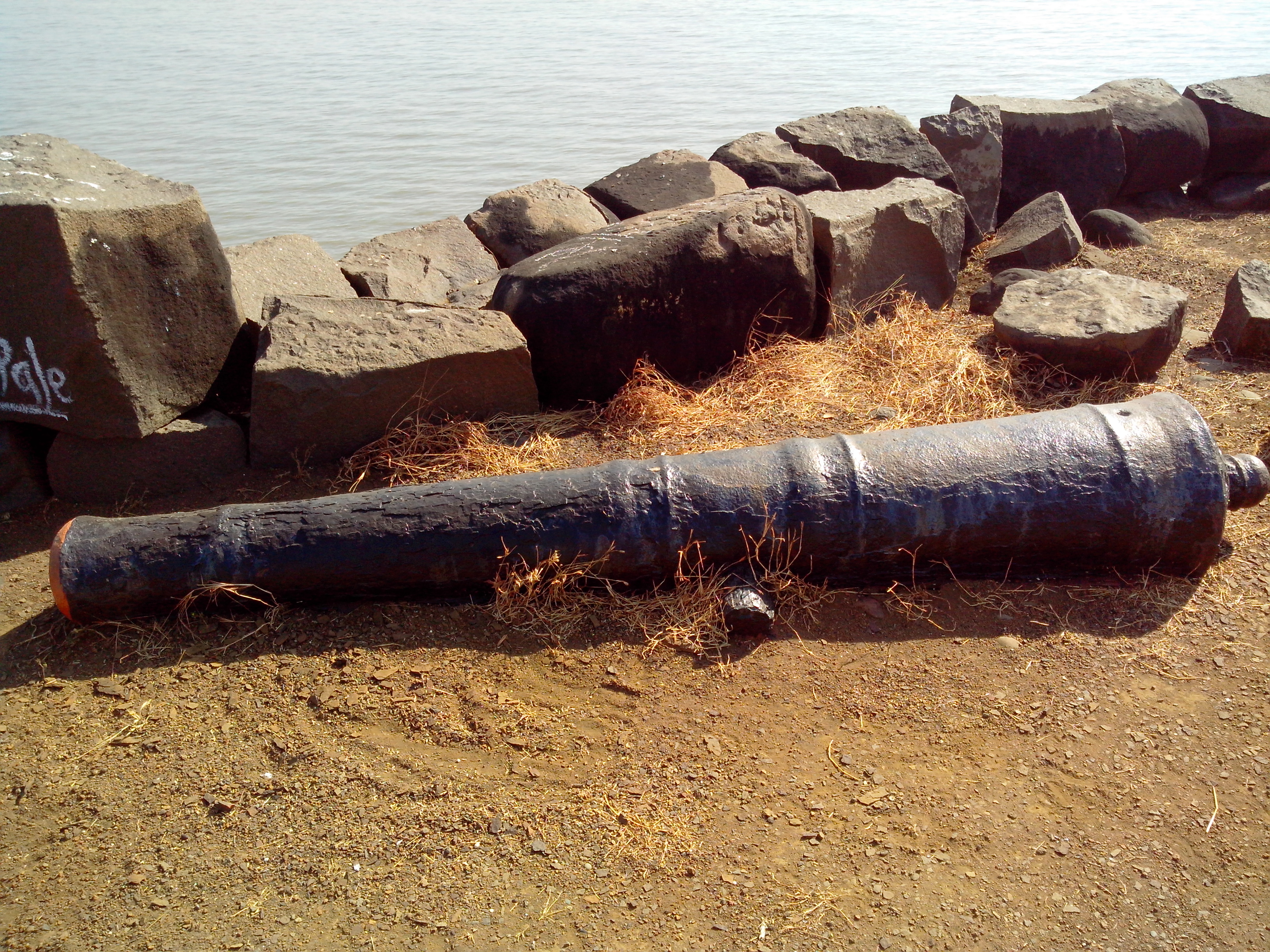
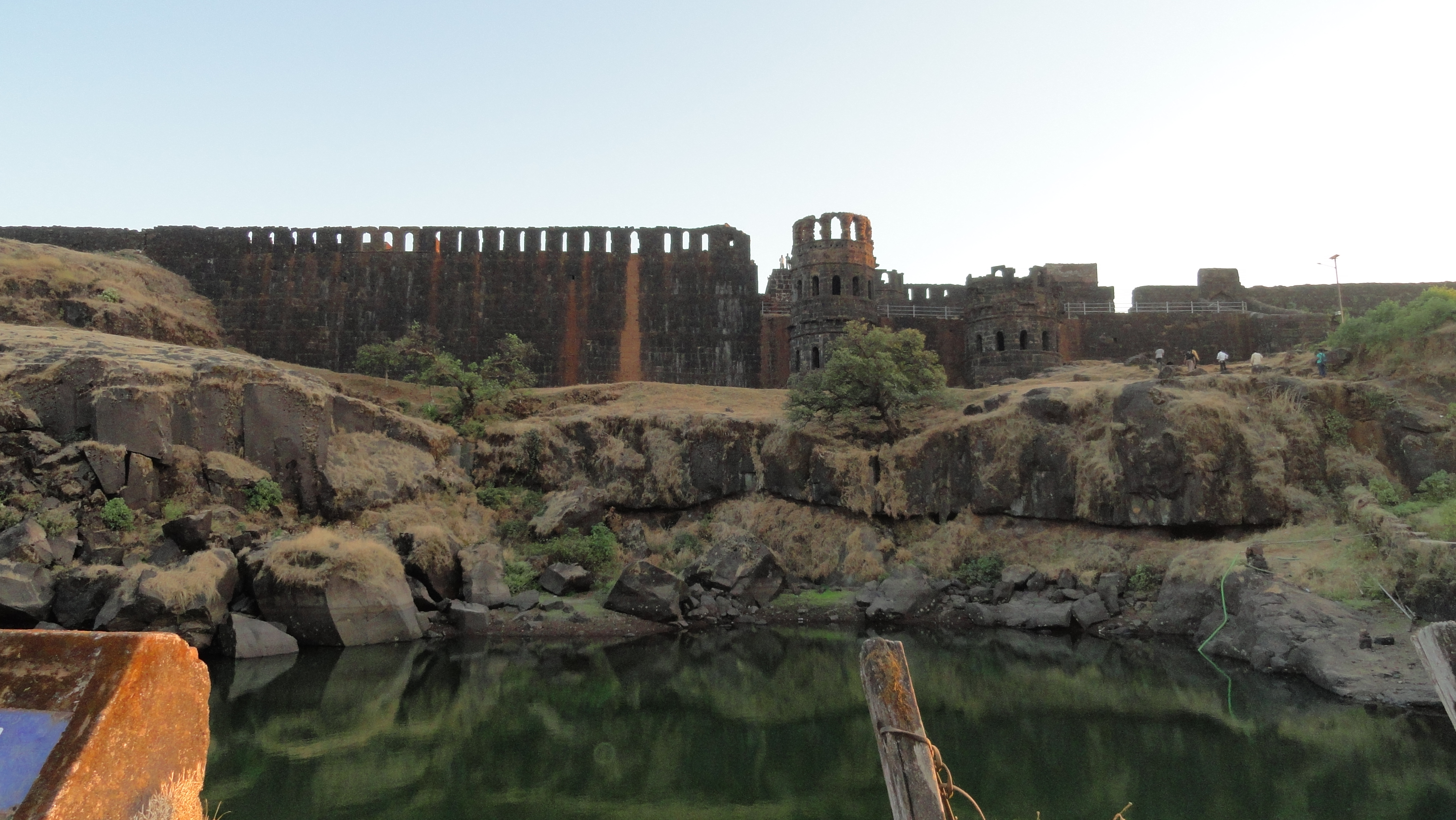
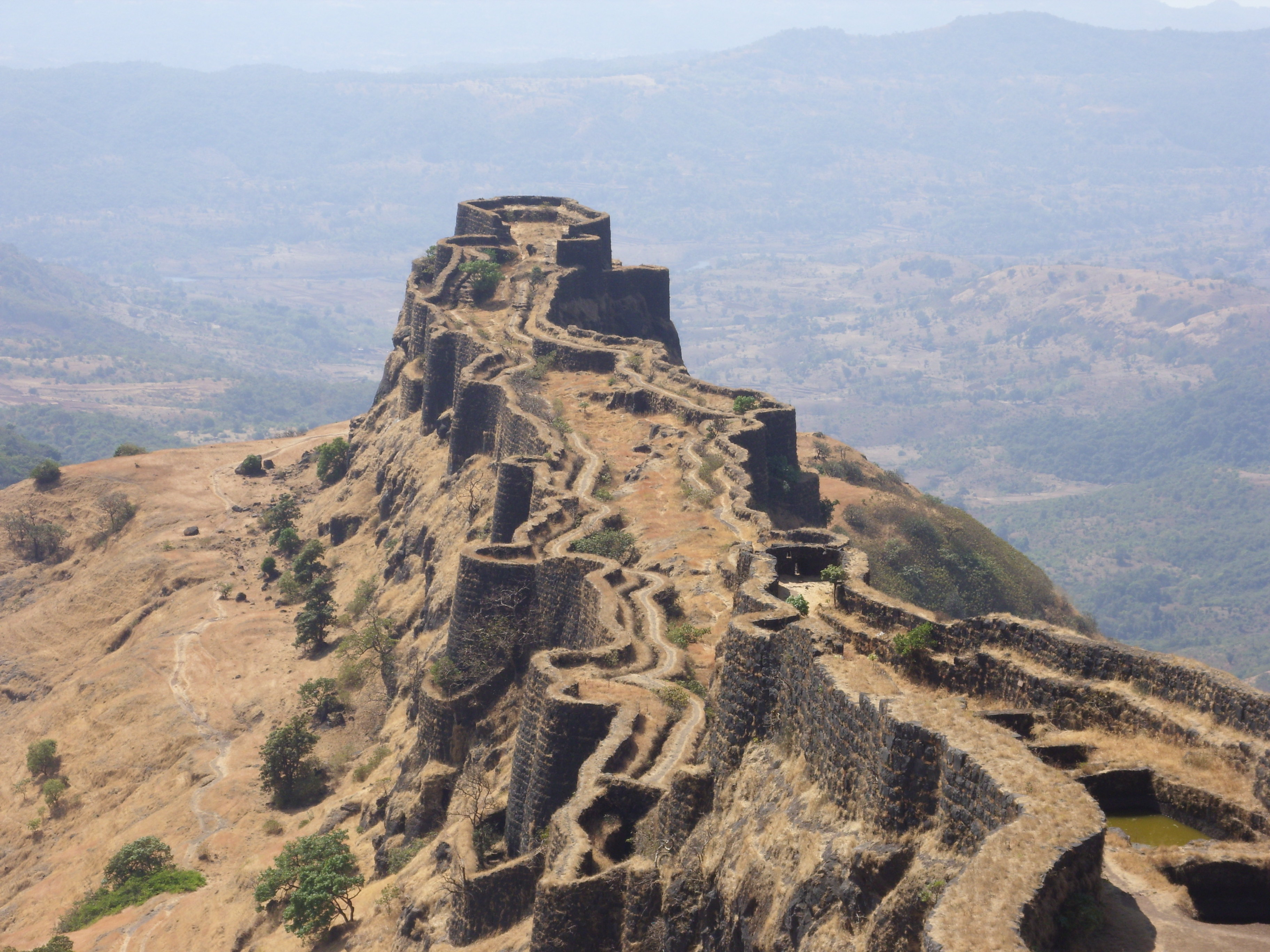
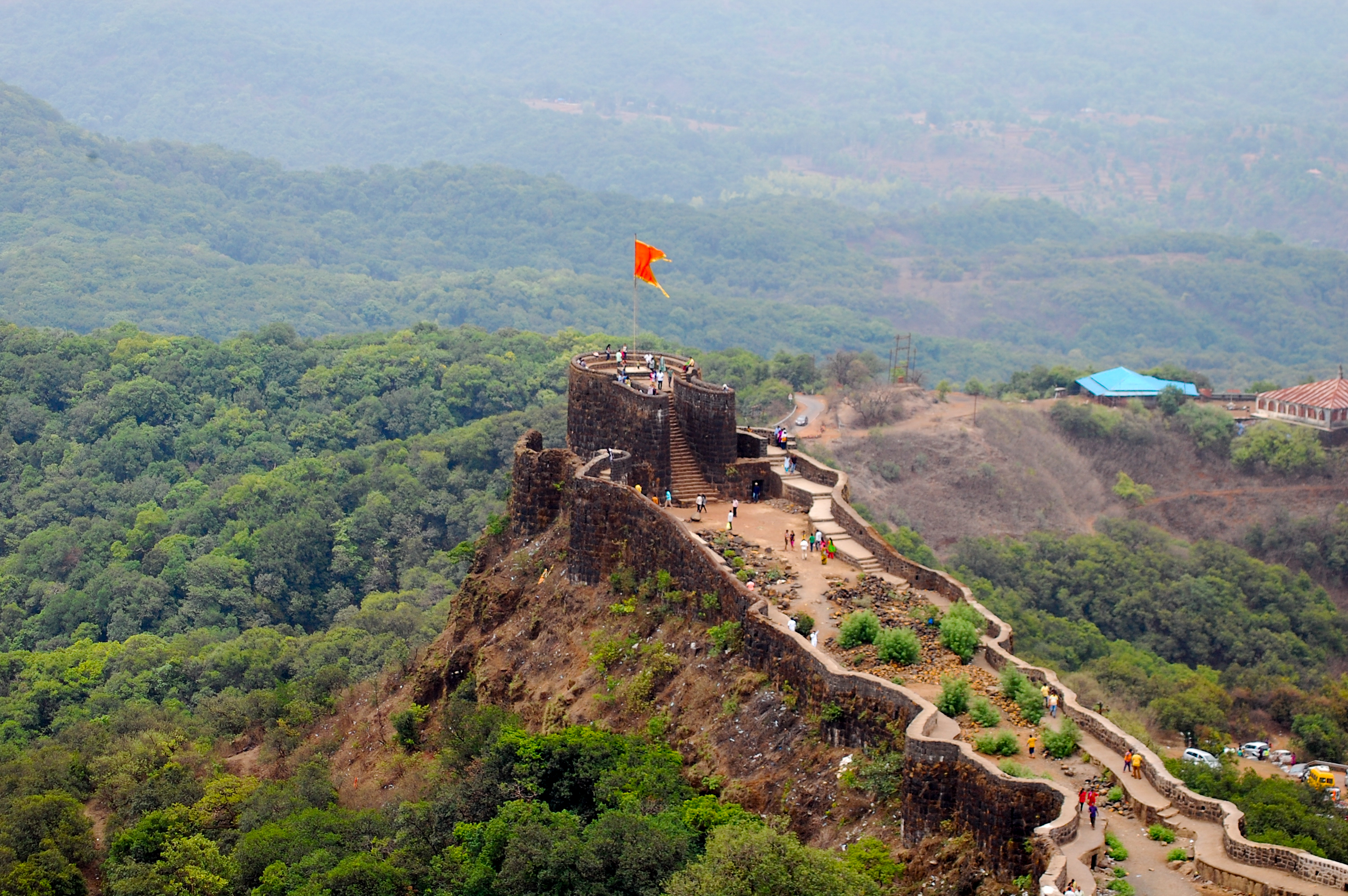
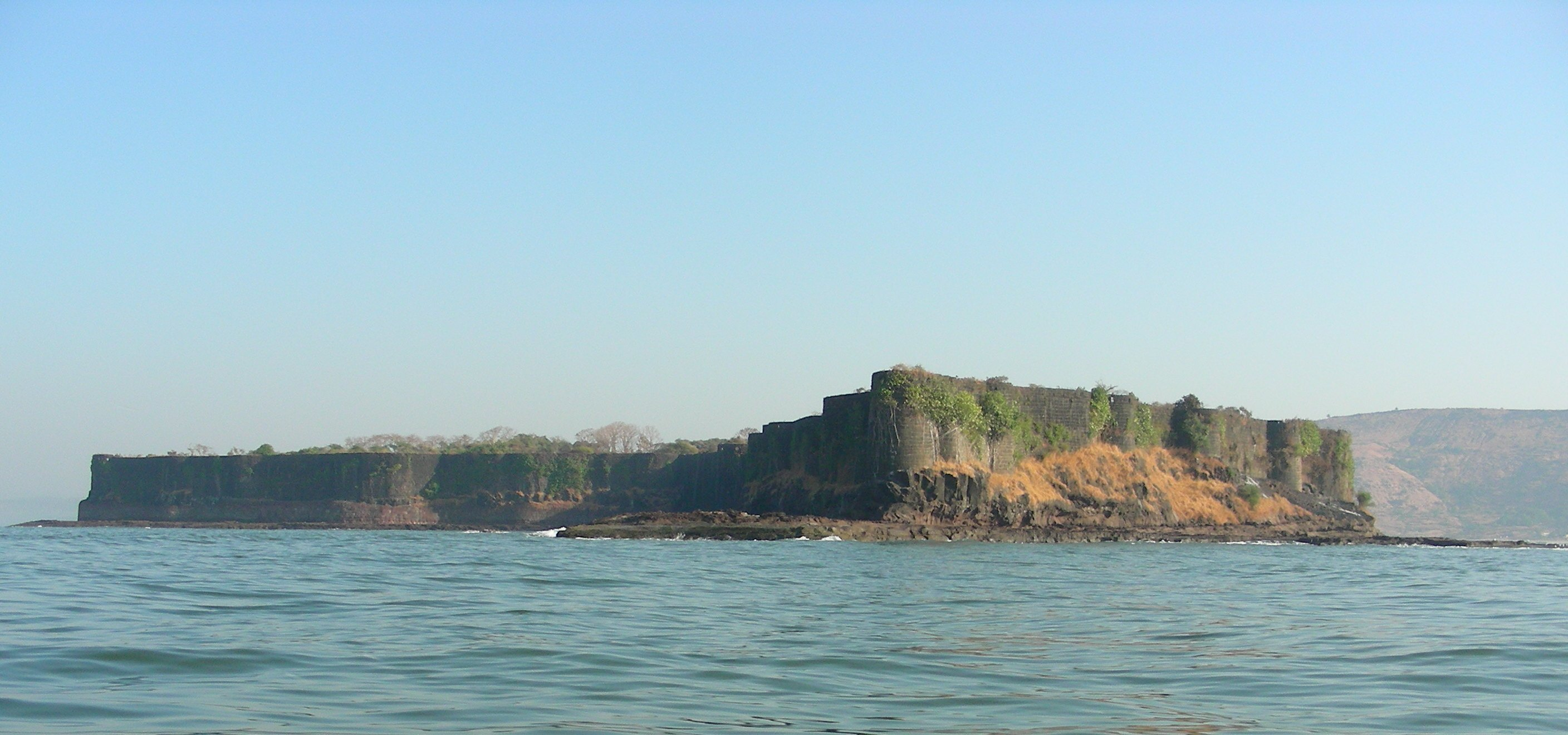
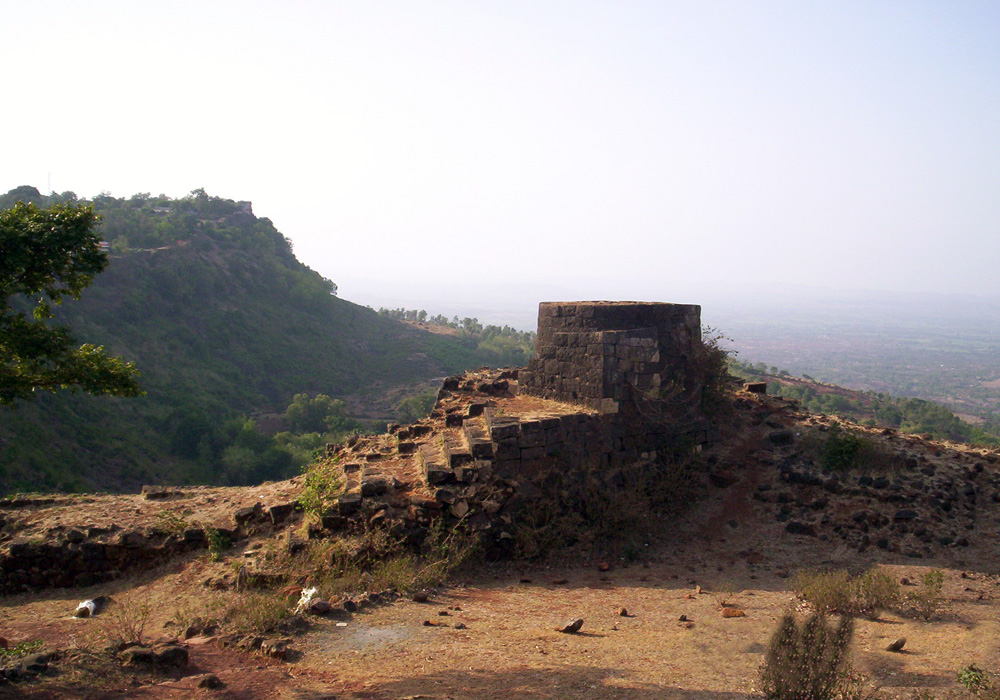
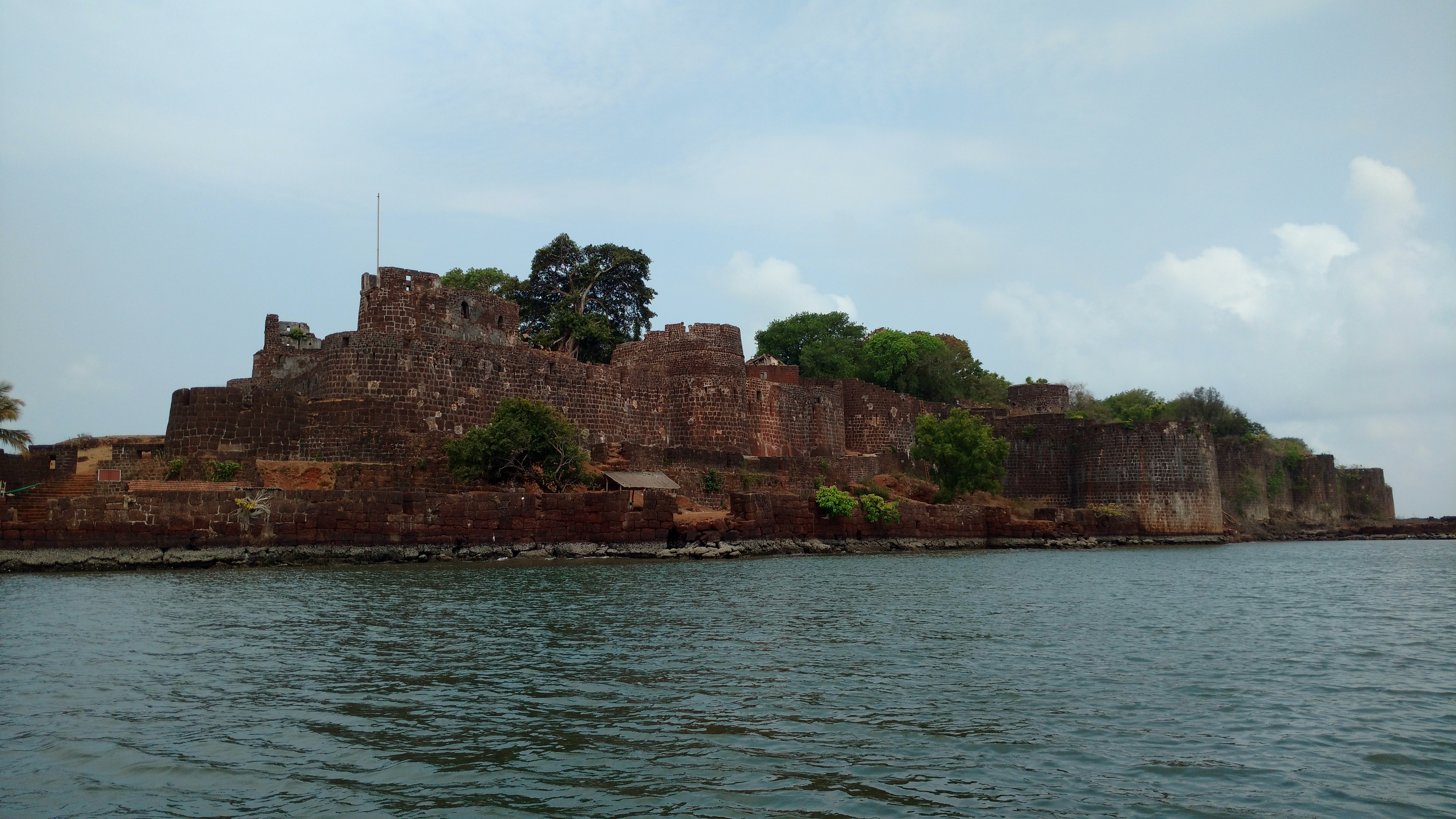
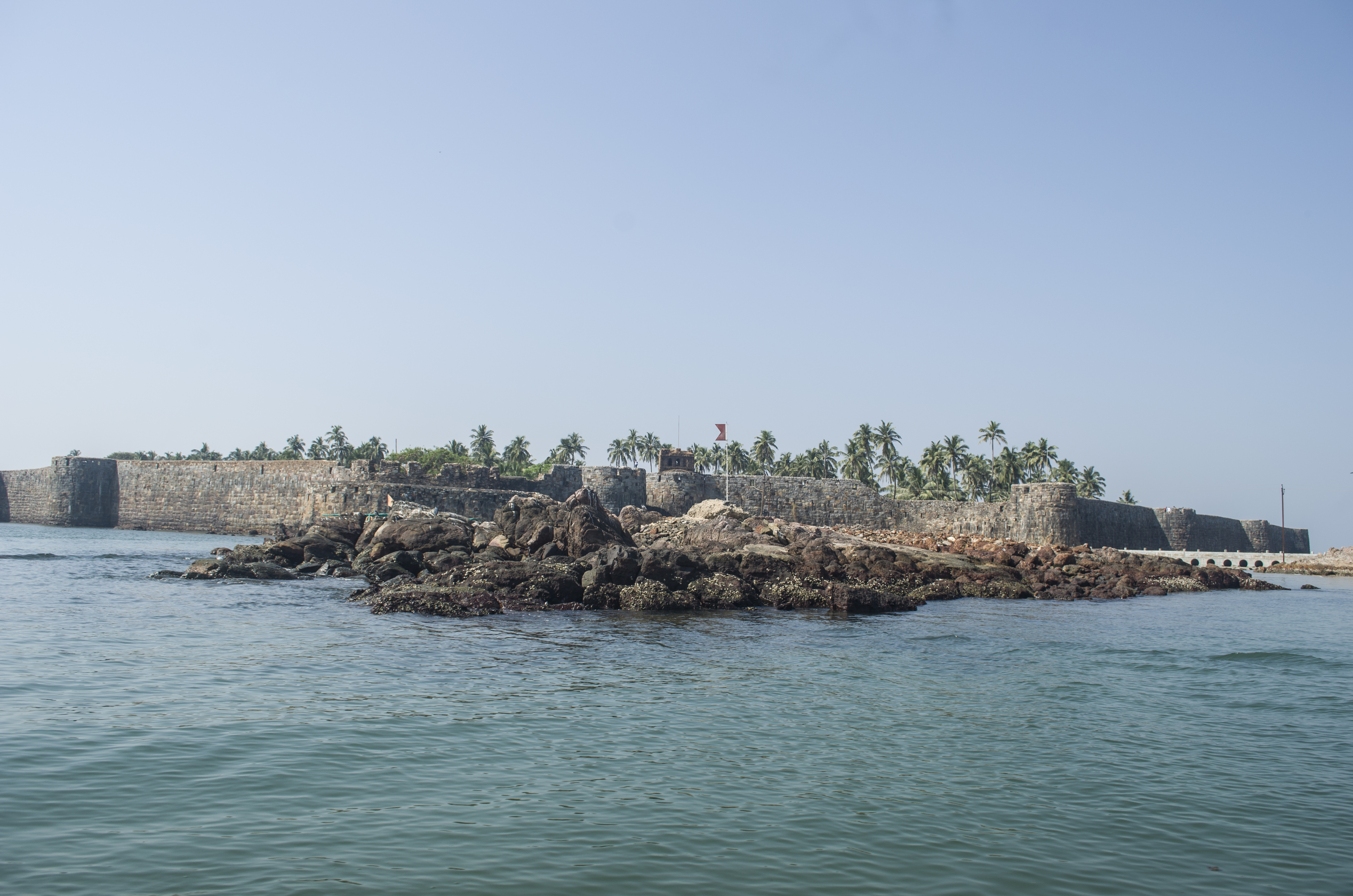
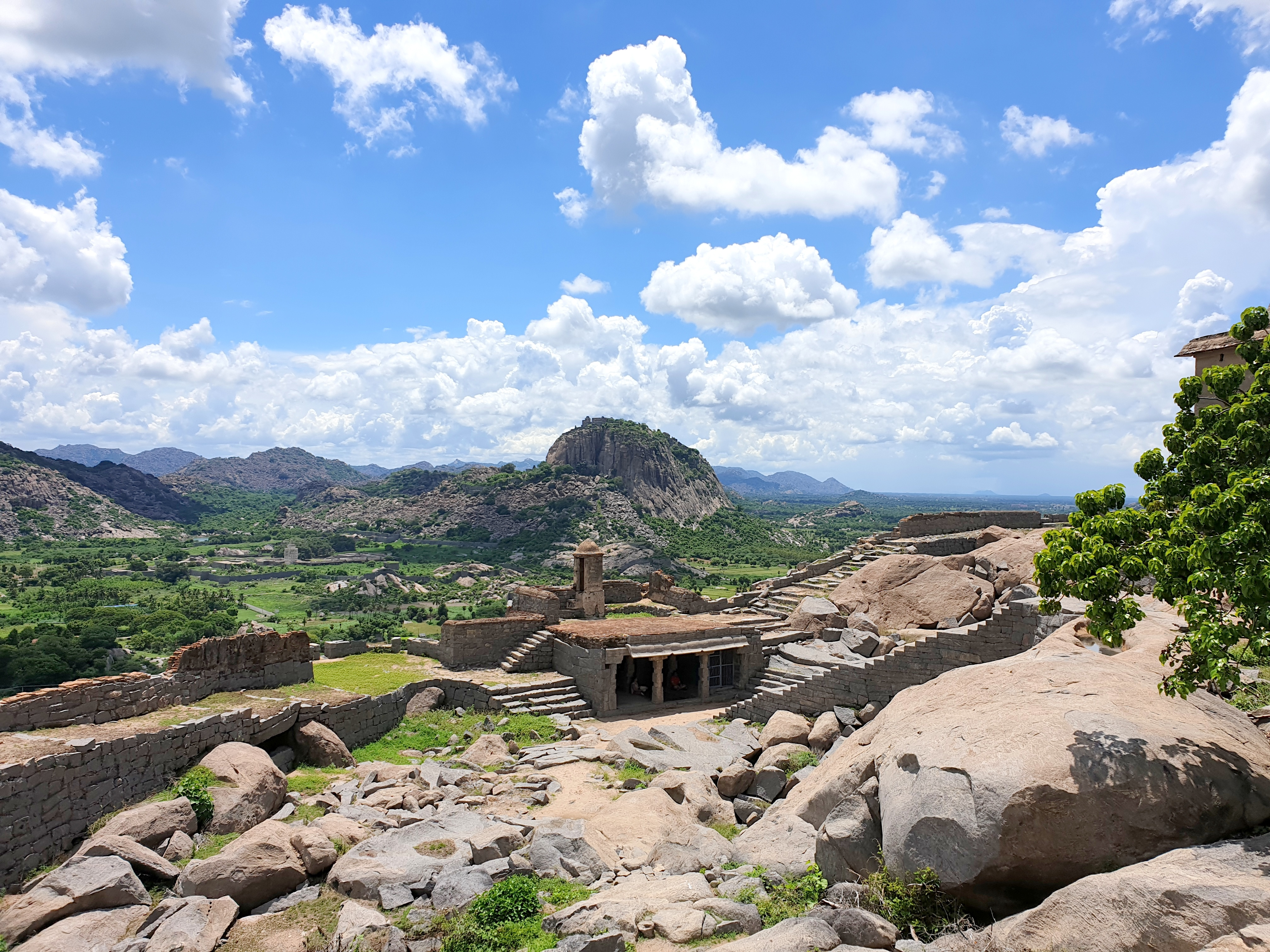
- Salher Shivneri Fort Lohagad Khanderi Raigad Fort Rajgad Fort Pratapgad Suvarnadurg Panhala Fort Vijaydurg Fort Sindhudurg Fort Gingee Fort

- Maratha Military Landscapes of India (India)
- Location: Maharashtra and Tamil Nadu
- Criteria: Cultural: (iv), (vi)
- Reference: 1739
- Inscription: 2025 (47th Session)

The Maratha Military Landscapes of India are a group of 12 forts that were occupied and developed by the Maratha rulers between the 17th and 19th-century. These include Salher, Shivneri Fort, Lohagad, Khanderi, Raigad Fort, Rajgad Fort, Pratapgad, Suvarnadurg, Panhala Fort, Vijaydurg Fort, Sindhudurg Fort, all located in Maharashtra and Gingee Fort in Tamil Nadu. Spread across various geographical terrains, these forts showcase the military prowess of Maratha rule. It was declared as a UNESCO World Heritage Site in 2025.

== Background ==
In 2021, the Maratha Military Landscapes of India were included in the Tentative World Heritage List. They were then picked as the official nomination from India for inscription in the UNESCO World Heritage List for the year 2024-25, as announced by the Ministry of Culture in January 2024. Maharashtra has more than 390 forts, out of which only 11 forts were selected for this list along with one fort in Tamil Nadu. These forts span across the diverse topographies of the Sahyadri Range, Deccan Plateau, Konkan Coast, and the Eastern Ghats. The Maratha military strategy that involved these forts was developed during the reign of the Maratha ruler Chhatrapati Shivaji Maharaj in the 17th-century and continued till the Peshwa rule in the early 19th-century.

The nomination process was followed with a survey of the forts by the UNESCO team in October 2024. In February 2025, a four-member delegation from Maharashtra led by Ashish Shelar, had visited Paris to provide technical and diplomatic presentations in a bid to push the World Heritage status for these forts. During the 47th session of World Heritage Convention in July 2025, the International Council on Monuments and Sites (ICOMOS) had recommended to defer India's entry stating that,“it fails to convincingly demonstrate how the dozen geographically scattered forts ... functioned as an integrated military defense system.” However, India's diplomatic response along with support from the international delegates, helped the nomination to be officially inscribed as a World Heritage Site.

== List of forts ==
Sr. No.	Name	Image	Year	Type	District with coordinates	State
1	Salher		1671	Hill	Nashik district 20.7225°N 73.9425°E	Maharashtra
2	Shivneri Fort		1595	Hill	Pune district 19.196667°N 73.858333°E	Maharashtra
3	Lohagad		1648	Hill	Pune district 18.71°N 73.476667°E	Maharashtra
4	Khanderi		1679	Island	Raigad district 18.703889°N 72.813333°E	Maharashtra
5	Raigad Fort		1674	Hill	Raigad district 18.236111°N 73.444444°E	Maharashtra
6	Rajgad Fort		1647	Hill	Pune district 18.246111°N 73.6825°E	Maharashtra
7	Pratapgad		1656	Hill-forest	Satara district 17.935833°N 73.578611°E	Maharashtra
8	Suvarnadurg		1696	Island	Ratnagiri district 17.816389°N 73.084444°E	Maharashtra
9	Panhala Fort		1659	Hill-plateau	Kolhapur district 16.811111°N 74.108056°E	Maharashtra
10	Vijaydurg Fort		1653	Coastal	Sindhudurg district 16.560833°N 73.333333°E	Maharashtra
11	Sindhudurg Fort		1664	Island	Sindhudurg district 16.0425°N 73.459722°E	Maharashtra
12	Gingee Fort		1677	Hill	Villupuram District; 12.250556°N 79.401389°E	Tamil Nadu
