= Maynak Bhandari =

First Admiral of Maratha Navy

Shreemant Sarkhel Maynak Bhandari
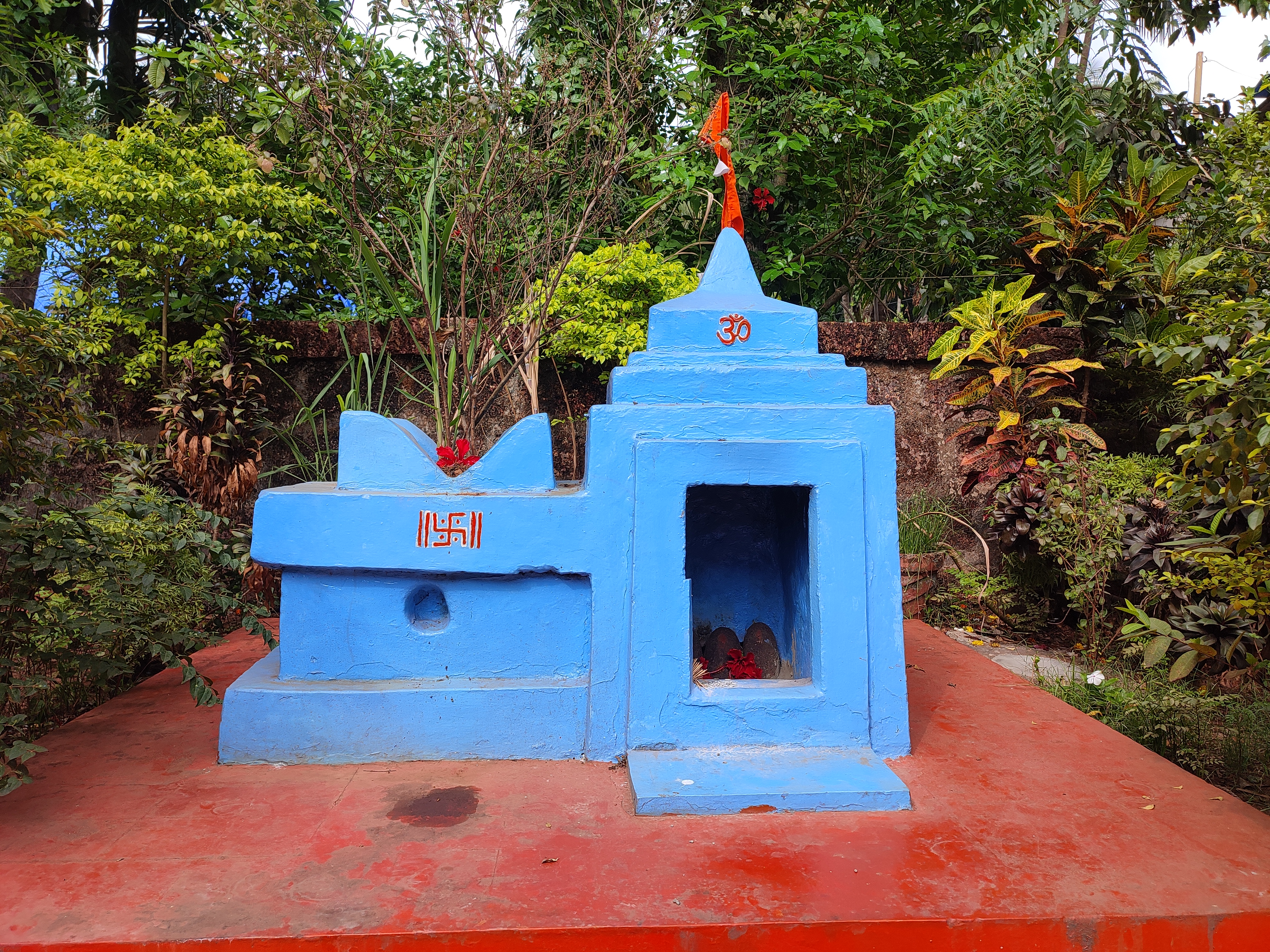
- Samadhi of Mayaji Bhatkar (Mainak Bhandari), Bhatye village, Ratnagiri

Sarkhel of the Maratha Navy
- Monarchs: Shivaji I (1676 - 1680); Sambhaji (1680 - 1682)
- Succeeded by: Kanhoji Angre

Personal details
- Born: Mayaji Bhatkar
- Occupation: Naval officer

Military service
- Allegiance: Maratha Empire
- Service: Maratha Navy
- Years of service: c. 1676 – 1682
- Battles/wars: Battle of Khanderi; Siege of Janjira

Mayaji Bhatkar, popularly known as Maynak Bhandari was one of the first Subhedar or Admiral of the Maratha Navy under ch.Shivaji, and helped in both building the Maratha Navy and safeguarding the coastline of the emerging Maratha Empire.

Along with Daria Sarang and Daulat Khan, other admirals who served Shivaji, Bhandari commanded a navy of 200 ships.

Under his leadership, Maratha navy won the campaign of Khanderi fort (1679–80)near Alibag against the East India Company and Siddis of Janjira State.

He also undertook an unsuccessful assault on the Underi fort on 18th Aug 1680.

He participated in the Siege of Janjira fort in 1682, along with other Admirals, Govind Kanho, & Sar-Subhedar (Grand Admiral) Govindrao Jadhav.

A memorial has been built to Ram Nayak Bhandari at Bhatye Village, close to Ratnagiri town.

== See also ==
- Ch.Shivaji
- Bhandaris
