= Chorina Comedy =

Theatre in Preobrazhenskoye, Moscow, Russia

The Choromina Comedy was a historic theatre in Preobrazhenskoye (in modern Preobrazhenskoye District), Moscow in Russia, founded in 1672. It was the first theatre in Russia. Founded on the order of tsar Alexis of Russia, it was a court theatre which provided theatre by German actors performing for the court of the tsar. The German court theatre was dissolved in 1676, but the building was used again from 1707 to 1711.
