= Khanderi =

Island Fort in Arabian Sea

- Part of Konkan Coast
- Raigad District, Maharashtra
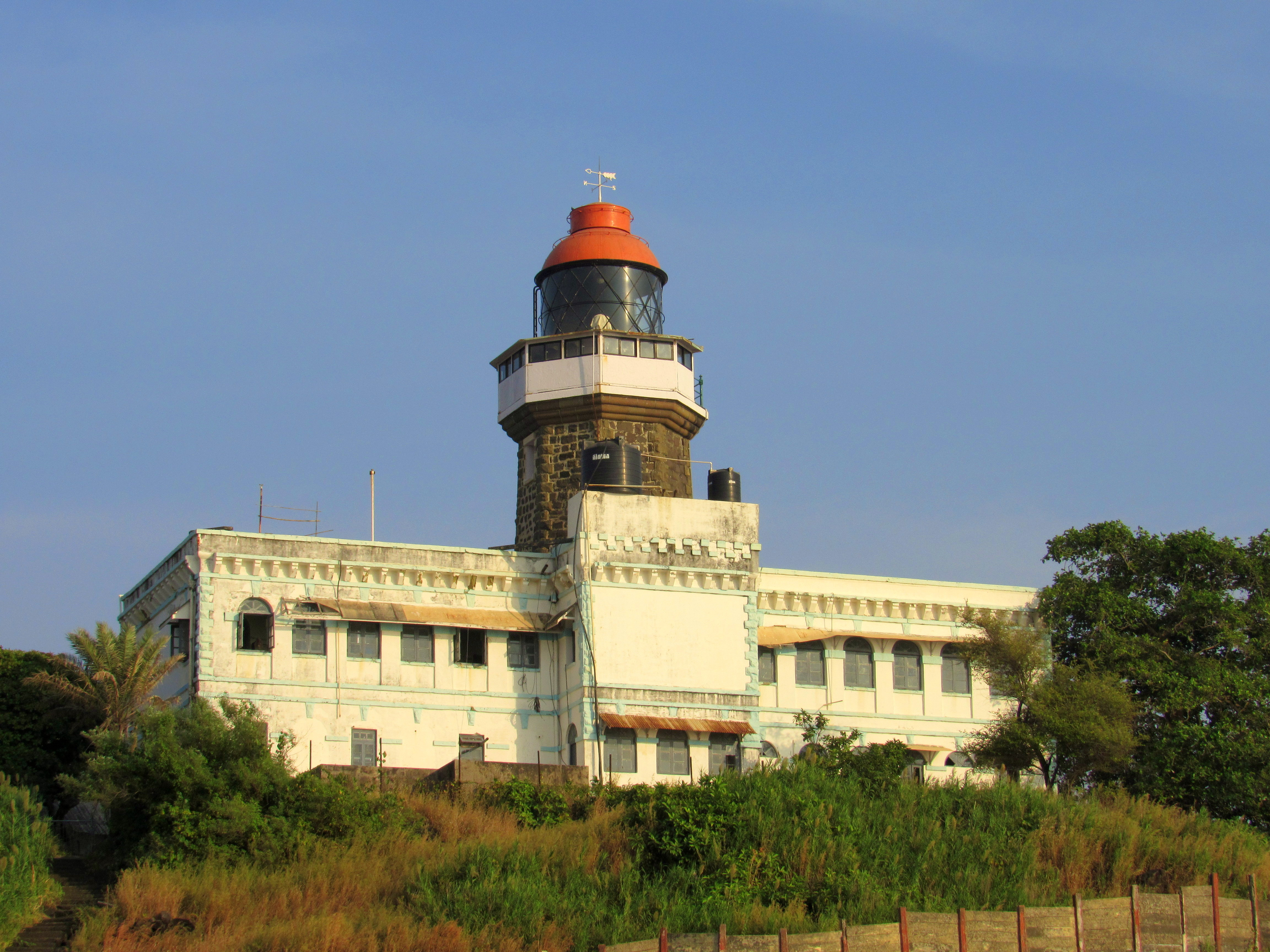
- Octagonal Lighthouse, Khanderi Fort

Site information
- Type: Sea fort
- Owner: Indian Navy
- Controlled by: Maratha Empire (1679-1818) United Kingdom: East India Company (1818-1857); British Raj (1857-1947); India (1947-)
- Open to the public: Yes

Location
- Khanderi shown within Maharashtra
- Location within Maharashtra
- Coordinates: 18.7042°N 72.8131°E

Site history
- Built: 1679
- Built by: Chhatrapati Shivaji
- Materials: Basalt stone

UNESCO World Heritage Site
- Part of: Maratha Military Landscapes of India
- Criteria: Cultural: iv, vi
- Reference: 1739-004
- Inscription: 2025 (47th Session)

Khanderi (officially Kanhoji Angre island) is an island with a fort, located south of Mumbai, along the coast of Maharashtra, India.

== Location ==
Khanderi is located 5 km off the coast of Maharashtra (off Thal, Kihim) and 20 km south of Mumbai. Khanderi, along with its sister fort Underi (Jaidurg) formed the major fortification along the Maharashtra coast, the former falling under Shivaji's control and the latter under his opponents, the Siddis. The island consists of two high hills, one facing north and the other facing south. Initially, the islands of Underi and Khanderi were uninhabited. It contained two wells to supply water to the forces within, and a temple of Sri Betal. The fort is a restricted area, which falls under the jurisdiction of the Indian Navy.

Additionally, the fort has a few old metal canons, the tomb of Daud Pir, a local saint and a musical stone that emits metallic musical notes when struck. There is a one secret way for going on the Kulaba fort of Alibag.

== History ==
In 1679, Khanderi was occupied by the forces of Shivaji under the leadership of Maynak Bhandari, who oversaw the building of the fortifying walls. Subsequently, Khanderi fort was built during the reign of the Maratha Emperor Shivaji Maharaj in 1679 CE to keep a check on the Siddis at Murud-Janjira fort and was the site of many battles between Shivaji's forces and the navy of Siddi. In November 1718, the island was the site of the Battle of Khanderi, where a small Maratha garrison under Mankoji Suryawanshi successfully repelled a massive naval siege led by the British East India Company's Governor Charles Boone. In 1813 Manaji Angre handed over the fort to Peshve in return of the support given against Baburao. The fort was subsequently ceded in 1818 to the forces of the British East India company at Bombay as part of the Peshwa territory. Most of the fort is still intact, with the most prominent structure being a lighthouse built by the British in June 1867 and the two storey building upon which the lighthouse is located. The lighthouse is 22 feet high and can be seen from up to 13 km away.

In 1998, Khanderi island was renamed Kanhoji Angre Island in honour of the Maratha Admiral Kanhoji Angre.

In September 2013, The Indian Ministry of Tourism and Ministry of Shipping drew up plans to develop Khanderi island and its octagonal light house as a tourist destination.
