= Underi =

Island in India

- Raigad District, Maharashtra

Site information
- Owner: Government of India
- Controlled by: Siddis
- Open to the public: Yes

Location
- Location within Maharashtra
- Coordinates: 18.705531°N 72.841281°E

Site history
- Built: 1680
- Built by: Siddis

Underi (also called Jaidurg) is a fortified island near the mouth of Mumbai harbour south of Prong's Lighthouse. It is a companion fort to Khanderi and currently lies in Raigad district, Maharashtra. These islands of Khanderi and Underi served as one of the landmarks for ships entering Mumbai harbour. Underi is smaller than Khanderi.

The fortification was built by Kahim of the Siddis in 1680 CE.
