= 1620s =

Decade

The 1620s decade ran from January 1, 1620, to December 31, 1629.

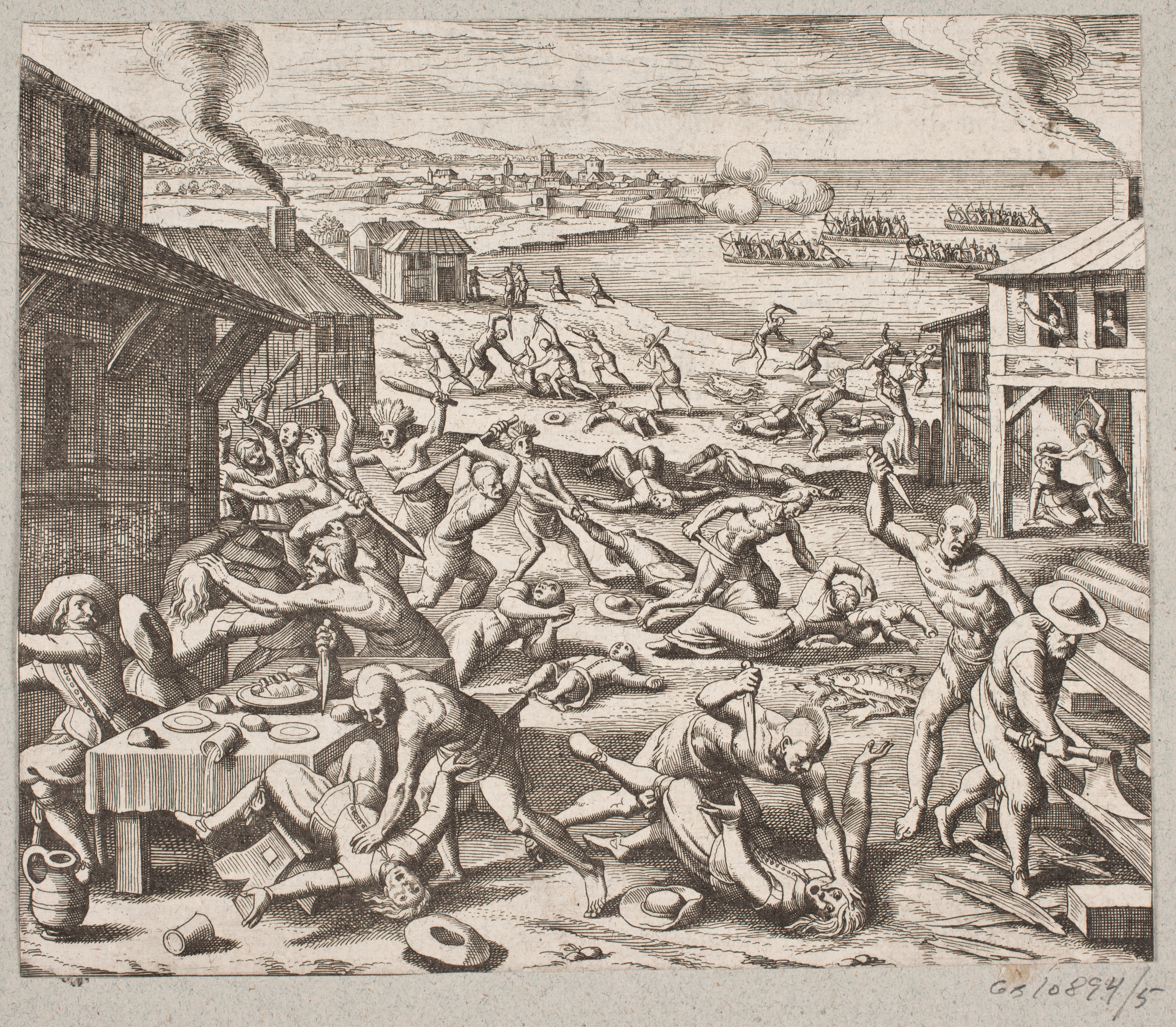
March 22, 1622: Jamestown massacre.

== Events ==
=== 1620 ===
November 8: The Battle of White Mountain.

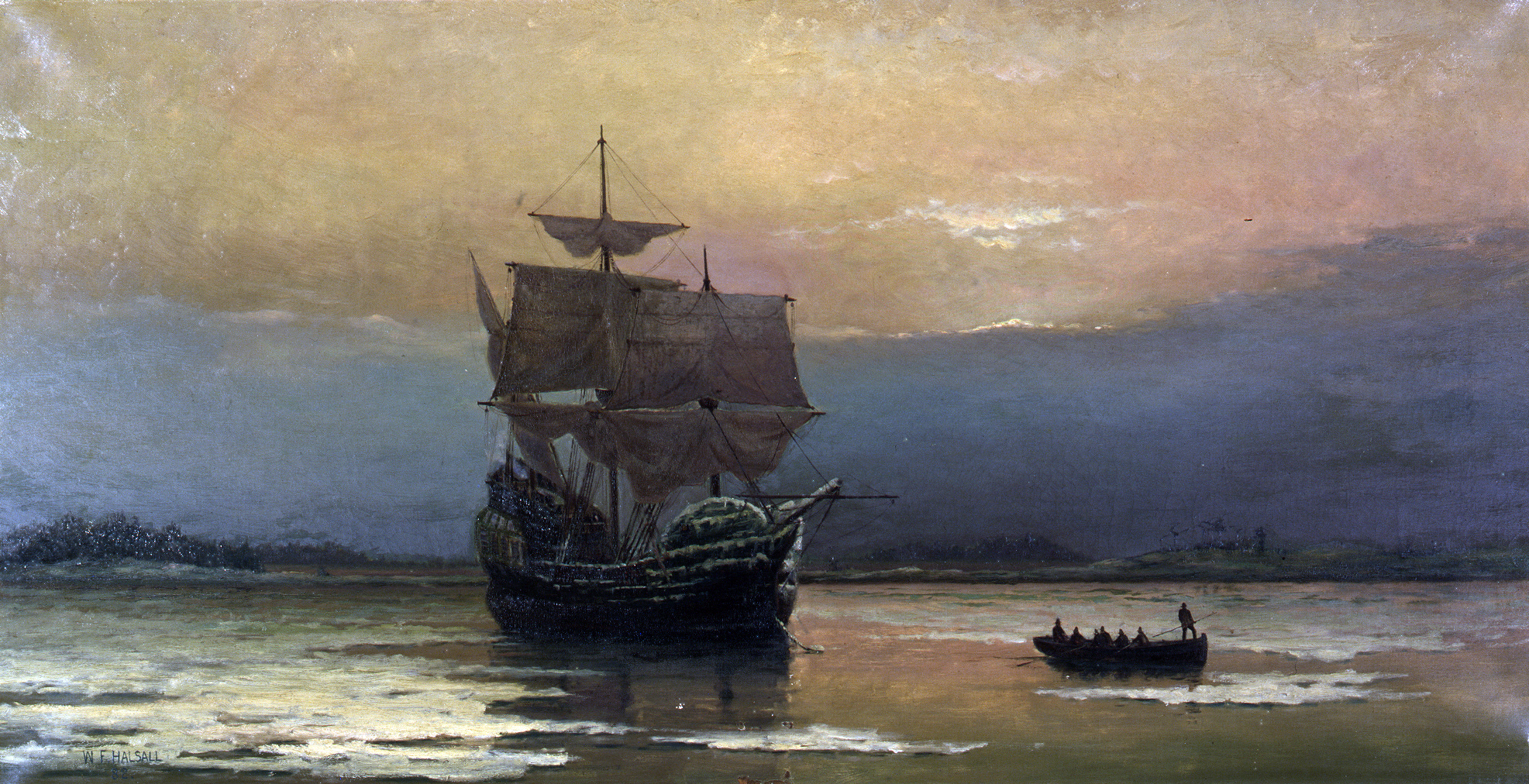
November 21: The Mayflower arrives at Cape Cod.

=== January–March ===
- January 7 – Ben Jonson's play News from the New World Discovered in the Moon is given its first performance, a presentation to King James VI and I. In addition to dialogue about actual observations made by telescope of the Moon, the play includes a fanciful discussion of a lunar civilisation, featuring a dance by the "Volatees", the lunar race.
- January 22 – In France, Charles d'Albert, duc de Luynes, and his wife, the Duchess Marie de Rohan, sign a marriage contract on behalf of their one-year-old daughter to be engaged to the year-old son of Charles, Duke of Guise.
- January 26 – Karan Singh II becomes the new ruler of the Kingdom of Mewar (in the modern-day state of Rajasthan in India) upon the death of his father, the Maharana Amar Singh I.
- February 4 – Prince Bethlen Gabor secures a peace treaty with Ferdinand II, Holy Roman Emperor.
- March 22 – King Karma Phuntsok Namgyal of Tibet dies of smallpox after a reign of less than two years, after Ngawang Namgyal of Bhutan casts a tantric spell over him.
- March 24 – English sailor Owen Fitzpen is captured by Turkish pirates while on a trading voyage in the Mediterranean Sea and sold into slavery. He remains a slave in North Africa for seven years until he and 10 other slaves are able to take over a Turkish ship and sail back to Europe.

=== April–June ===
- April 1 – Ferdinand II, Holy Roman Emperor and former King of Bohemia, sends a two-month ultimatum directing King Frederick of Bohemia (who has usurped the throne in the modern-day Czech Republic) to leave Bohemia by June 1. Frederick refuses to depart his capital at Prague.
- April 7 – The earliest recorded earthquake in South Africa occurs at Robben Island.
- April 20 – Mian Shahul Mouhammed Kalhoro begins his reign at Karachi as the king of Sindh, in modern-day Pakistan, and rules until 1657.
- May 17 – The first merry-go-round is seen at a fair in Philippapolis, Turkey.
- June 3 – The oldest stone church in French North America, Notre-Dame-des-Anges, is begun at Quebec City in modern-day Canada.

=== July–September ===
- July 3
  - Under the terms of the Treaty of Ulm, the Protestant Union declares neutrality and ceases to support Frederick V of the Palatinate's claim to the throne of Bohemia.
  - Captain Andrew Shilling, on behalf of the English Honourable East India Company, lays claim to Table Bay in Africa.
- July 25 (July 15 OS) – The armed merchant ship Mayflower embarks about 65 emigrants for New England at or near her home port of Rotherhithe on the Thames east of London; about July 29 (July 19 OS) she anchors in Southampton Water.
- August 1 (July 22 OS) – The ship Speedwell departs Delfshaven with English separatist Puritans from Leiden bound to rendezvous with the Mayflower; on August 5 (July 26 OS) she anchors in Southampton Water.
- August 7
  - The mother of astronomer Johannes Kepler is arrested for witchcraft.
  - In a battle at Les Ponts-de-Cé in France, King Louis XIII defeats troops led by his mother, Marie de' Medici.
- August 15 (probable date; August 5 OS) – Mayflower and Speedwell depart together from Southampton, but are forced to put back into Dartmouth, Devon, for repairs to a leak in the latter ship on August 22 or 23 (August 12 or 13 OS).
- September 2 (August 23 OS) – Mayflower and Speedwell depart together from Dartmouth; they are well out into the Atlantic when the Speedwell is again found to be leaking.
- September 7 (August 28 OS)
  - Mayflower and Speedwell return again to England, anchoring at Plymouth; the latter ship is given up as a participant in the voyage and on September 12 (September 2 OS) departs for London, most of her passengers and stores having been transferred to the Mayflower.
  - The Finnish town of Kokkola (Swedish: Karleby) is founded by King Gustavus Adolphus of Sweden.
- September 16 (September 6 OS) – Mayflower departs from Plymouth in England on her third attempt to cross the Atlantic. The Pilgrims on board comprise 41 "saints" (English separatists largely from Holland), 40 "strangers" (largely secular planters from London), 23 servants and hired workers, together with c. 30 crew.
- September 17–October 7 – Battle of Cecora: The Ottoman Empire defeats Polish–Lithuanian Commonwealth–Moldavian troops.

=== October–December ===
- October 6 – Battle of Amedamit in Gojjam, Ethiopia: The Roman Catholic Ras Sela Kristos, half-brother of Emperor Susenyos, crushes a group of rebels, who are opposed to Susenyos' pro-Catholic beliefs.
- November 3 – The Great Patent is granted to Plymouth Colony.
- November 8 – Thirty Years' War: Battle of White Mountain – Catholic Habsburg forces are victorious over Bohemian rebels two hours from Prague.
- November 21 (November 11 OS) – The Mayflower arrives inside the tip of Cape Cod (named from the Concord voyage of 1602), at what becomes known as Provincetown Harbor, with the Pilgrims and Planters; 41 Plymouth Colony settlers sign the Mayflower Compact, the first governing document of the colony, on board the ship.
- November 25 – The wedding of Gustav II Adolf and Maria Eleonora takes place in Sweden.
- December 21 – Plymouth Colony: William Bradford and the Mayflower Pilgrims land near what becomes known as Plymouth Rock, in Plymouth, Massachusetts.

=== Date unknown ===
- "A Dutch Ship, putting in this Year [of 1620, before June], sold 20 Negroes to the Colony [as slaves], which were the first of that Generation, that were ever brought to Virginia."
- A severe frost in England freezes the River Thames; 13 continuous days of snow blanket Scotland. On Eskdale Moor, only 35 of a flock of 20,000 sheep survive.
- History of submarines: Cornelis Drebbel demonstrates the first navigable undersea boat in the Thames in England.
- Juan Pablo Bonet, teacher of deaf children in the Spanish court, creates a sign alphabet.
- Francis Bacon publishes the Novum Organum (beyond Aristotle's Organon) on logical thinking.
- A Short Account of the Destruction of the Indies by Bartolomé de las Casas and Origin and progress of the disturbances in the Netherlands by Johannes Gysius are re-published in the Netherlands.
- Shōgun Tokugawa Hidetada begins restoring Osaka Castle in Japan. Its modern-day appearance dates from this remodeling.

=== Ongoing ===
- The Thirty Years' War (1618–1648) continues (principally on the territory of modern-day Germany).

=== January–March ===
- January 12 – Şehzade Mehmed, the 15-year old half-brother of Ottoman Sultan Osman II, is put to death by hanging on Osman's orders. Before dying, Mehmed prays aloud that Osman's reign as Sultan be ruined.
- January 18 – The Dutch East India Company formally names its fortress at Jayakarta in Indonesia, calling it Batavia. Upon the independence of the Dutch East Indies as Indonesia in 1945, Batavia will be renamed Jakarta.
- January 22 – The Tianqi era begins in Ming Dynasty China, six months after Zhu Changluo becomes the Taichang Emperor.
- January 24 – Twelve days after the murder of Prince Mehmed on orders of Sultan Osman II, Constantinople is hit by bitter winter weather, leading to rioting by persons who believe that the punishment of Osman is the will of Allah.
- January 28 – Pope Paul V (Camillo Borghese) dies at the age of 70 after 15 years as Pontiff.
- January 29 – Ferdinand II, Holy Roman Emperor, declares the Elector of the Palatinate, Frederick V, to be a traitor to the Empire.
- February 9 – Papal Conclave of 1621: Pope Gregory XV succeeds Pope Paul V, as the 234th pope.
- February 17 – Myles Standish is appointed as the first commander of Plymouth Colony.
- March 16 – Samoset, a Mohegan, visits the settlers of Plymouth Colony and greets them: "Welcome, Englishmen! My name is Samoset."
- March 22 – The Pilgrims of Plymouth Colony sign a peace treaty with Massasoit of the Wampanoags.
- March 31 – King Philip IV of Spain begins his 44-year rule.

=== April–June ===
- April 1 – The Plymouth, Massachusetts colonists create the first treaty with native Americans.
- April 5 – The Mayflower sets sail from Plymouth, on a return trip to England.
- April 9 – The Twelve Years' Truce between the Dutch Republic and the Spanish Empire expires, and both sides prepare to resume the Eighty Years' War.
- May 2 – The Panama earthquake affects the Isthmus of Panama, with an estimated magnitude of 6.9, and a maximum Mercalli intensity of VII.
- May 12 – The city of Tornio in Lapland is founded by King Gustavus Adolphus of Sweden, becoming the northernmost city in the world at the time.
- May 24 – The Protestant Union is formally dissolved.
- June 3 – The Dutch West India Company is founded.
- June 21 – Thirty Years' War: Twenty-seven Czech lords are executed on the Old Town Square in Prague, as a consequence of the Battle of White Mountain.
- June 24 – Huguenot rebellions: Saint-Jean-d'Angély is taken, after a 26-day siege by Royal forces.

=== July–September ===
- July 25 – Thirty Years' War – Battle of Neu Titschein: Remnants of the Bohemian army temporarily hold off the Imperial advance in Silesia.
- August 8 – Huguenot rebellions: The French Protestant city of La Rochelle joins in the revolt by Benjamin, Duke of Soubise.
- August 22 – Huguenot rebellions: Louis XIII besieges the city of Montauban, but is forced to abandon the battle by November 9.
- September 2 – The Battle of Khotyn begins as a force of more than 120,000 Ottoman troops attacks the Moldavian city of Khotyn. Despite the Ottomans' numerical superiority, the Polish-Lithuanian Commonwealth wins the battle and forces a surrender five weeks later.

=== October–December ===
- October 9 – The Treaty of Khotyn is signed between the Ottoman Empire and the Polish–Lithuanian Commonwealth, ending the First Polish-Ottoman War.
- October 9 (September 29 O.S.) – The Pilgrims of Plymouth Colony and Wampanoags celebrate a harvest feast (three days), later regarded as the First Thanksgiving, noted for the temporary peace between the English and the local Indians. The celebration is believed by later historians to have coincided with Michaelmas, observed on September 29 by the Anglican Communion on the calendar used in England at the time.
- November 11 – The ship Fortune arrives at Plymouth Colony, with 35 more settlers.
- December 31 – Thirty Years' War: The Peace of Nikolsburg is signed between Ferdinand II, Holy Roman Emperor and Gabor Bethlen, Prince of Transylvania. Bethlen agrees to renounce his claims to Hungary. In return Bethlen receives several counties and lands along the eastern border of the Holy Roman Empire, and Moravia is granted religious freedom.
- December – The Dutch mathematician and astronomer, Willebrord Snel van Royen (1580–1626), reveals he has rediscovered the law of refraction, also known as Snellius' law.

=== Date unknown ===
- The Venezuelan city of Petare is founded by Spanish conquistadors, as San Jose de Guanarito.
- The Swedish city of Gothenburg is founded by King Gustavus Adolphus of Sweden. The king also grants city rights to Luleå, Piteå and Torneå (Tornio). Riga falls under the rule of Sweden.
- Tamblot rallies an unknown, large number of people in Bohol, Captaincy General of the Philippines to revolt against the Spanish Empire.
- The Dutch East India Company sends 2,000 soldiers, under the command of Jan Pieterszoon Coen, to the Banda Islands, in order to force the local inhabitants to accept the Dutch trade monopoly on the lucrative nutmeg, grown almost exclusively on those islands. The soldiers proceed to massacre most of the 15,000 indigenous inhabitants.

=== January–May ===
- January 7 – The Holy Roman Empire and Transylvania sign the Peace of Nikolsburg.
- February 8 – King James I of England dissolves the English Parliament.
- March 12 – Ignatius of Loyola, Francis Xavier, Teresa of Ávila, Isidore the Farmer and Philip Neri are canonized by Pope Gregory XV.
- March 22 – Jamestown massacre: Algonquian natives kill 347 English settlers outside Jamestown, Virginia (one third of the colony's population), and burn the Henricus settlement. This begins the American Indian Wars.

=== April–June ===
- April 22 – Hormuz is captured from the Portuguese, by an Anglo-Persian force.
- April 27 – Thirty Years' War – Skirmish at Mingolsheim: Protestant forces under Mansfeld and Georg Friedrich of Baden-Durlach defeat the Imperial forces under Tilly. The Protestants win, but afterwards Tilly links up with a Spanish army under Gonzalo de Córdoba, greatly increasing his strength.
- May 6 – Thirty Years' War: While waiting for the Protestant forces of Christian the Younger of Brunswick to join them, Mansfeld and Georg Friedrich of Baden-Durlach split up their forces as a diversion for the Imperial army of Tilly. Their plan fails, as Tilly manages to cut off Georg Friedrich at Wimpfen. At the ensuing Battle of Wimpfen, Georg Friedrich's army is almost completely destroyed.
- May 13 – The Eendracht, a VOC ship and the second recorded European ship to make landfall on Australian soil, is wrecked off the western coast of Ambon Island, Dutch East Indies.
- May 20 – Ottoman Sultan Osman II is strangled by rebelling Janissaries, who revolted when they heard rumours that Osman II was planning to move against them.
- May 25 – The English ship Tryall, which left Plymouth, England for Batavia (now Jakarta), wrecks on the Tryal Rocks, nine months later (the wreck is discovered in 1969).
- May – Huguenot rebellions: The Huguenot city of Royan is taken by royal forces, after a short siege.
- June 11 – Huguenot rebellions: The Huguenot city of Nègrepelisse is taken, after a short siege by royal forces. The entire population of the city is subsequently massacred, and the city is burned to the ground.
- June 20 – Thirty Years' War: Imperial forces under Tilly attempt to prevent Christian the Younger of Brunswick from moving his army across the Main River, to link up with Mansfeld. At the Battle of Höchst, Tilly manages to inflict considerable casualties on the Protestant forces, as well as seizing Brunswick's baggage train. Nonetheless, the bulk of Brunswick's forces manage to unite with Mansfeld.
- June 24 – Dutch–Portuguese War – Battle of Macau: The outnumbered Portuguese forces successfully defend Macau from the Dutch fleet, keeping a Portuguese foothold in the Far East.

=== July–September ===
- July 13 – Thirty Years' War: After Mansfeld fails to relieve the siege of Heidelberg, Frederick V of the Palatinate cancels Mansfeld's contract and disbands his army. The unemployed army of Mansfeld and Christian the Younger of Brunswick is subsequently hired by the Dutch.
- July 13 or July 14 – English and Dutch ships defeat the Portuguese, near Portuguese East Africa.
- July 18 – Eighty Years' War: Bergen op Zoom is besieged by a Spanish army, under the command of Ambrogio Spinola.
- August 29 – Thirty Years' War: While on their way to relieve the Siege of Bergen-op-Zoom in the Netherlands, the army of Mansfeld and Christian of Brunswick is blocked by a Spanish army, led by Gonzalo de Córdoba. In the Battle of Fleurus, Cordoba manages to fight off the Protestant assault. The next day, Cordoba surprises the retreating Protestant army with his cavalry, resulting in the destruction of most of the Protestant army.
- September 5 – Armand Jean du Plessis becomes Cardinal Richelieu.
- September 6 – Spanish treasure fleet sinks off Marquesas Keys in the straits of Florida. Atocha, Margarita, and Rosario are the most heavily laden treasure ships found in the 20th century.
- September 10 – 55 Christians are executed in Nagasaki during the Great Genna Martyrdom.
- September 19 – Thirty Years' War: Heidelberg, the capital of the Electorate of the Palatinate, is taken by the Imperial army of Tilly' after a three-month siege.

=== October–December ===
- October 2 – Eighty Years' War: After a siege of 86 days, Bergen op Zoom is relieved by a Dutch army led by Maurice of Nassau and Ernst von Mansfeld.
- October 18 – Huguenot rebellions: The first Huguenot rebellion ends, with the signing of the Treaty of Montpellier.
- October 27 – Huguenot rebellions: The inconclusive Naval battle of Saint-Martin-de-Ré is fought between the Huguenot fleet of La Rochelle, commanded by Jean Guiton, and a royal fleet under the command of Charles of Guise.
- November 2 – After a siege of 13 days, the German city of Mannheim is captured from England by a force of Spanish and Imperial Holy Roman troops led by Johann Tserclaes, Count of Tilly.
- November 25 – King Christian IV of Denmark invites the Sephardic Jews of Amsterdam in the Dutch Republic to settle in the newly-built Danish town of Lykstad, promising them the free exercise of their religion without persecution. The city remains part of Denmark until 1864 until it is captured in the Second Schleswig War and is now part of Germany as Glückstadt.
- November 30 – A fleet of 43 Dutch ships from Suriname attacks the Araya Peninsula in Venezuela in an attempt to halt construction of a Spanish fortress. The Spanish drive the Dutch away after six weeks of fighting, ending January 13, 1623.
- December 18 – Portuguese forces with Imbangala allies score a military victory over the Kingdom of Kongo at the Battle of Mbumbi in modern-day Angola as part of the First Kongo-Portuguese War.
- December 22 – The Spanish colonial city of Bucaramanga is founded in the colony of Nueva Grandada in what is now Colombia.

=== Date unknown ===
- Dutch ships under Jochem Swartenhont, while escorting a convoy, repel a Spanish squadron near Gibraltar.
- Portugal loses control of the island of Ormus, after 107 years.
- Albertus Magnus is beatified, and Teresa of Ávila is canonized, by the Roman Catholic Church.
- Rosicrucianism furor breaks out in Paris.
- War between the Netherlands and Spain recommences, after the Twelve Years' Truce (1609–1621).
- The Golden Horn freezes.
- First record of bottled spring water in England at Holy Well, Malvern.

=== January–March ===
- January 21
  - Viscount Falkland, England's Lord Deputy of Ireland, issues a proclamation ordering all Roman Catholic priests to leave Ireland, affecting negotiations over the "Spanish match" (which resume in March).
  - Voyage of the Pera and Arnhem to Australia: Captains Jan Carstenszoon of the Arnhem and Willem Joosten van Coolsteerdt of the Pera depart on an expedition for the Dutch East India Company from Ambon, Maluku (Amboyna) to explore the Australian coast.
- January – Battle of Mbanda Kasi: Forces from the Kingdom of Kongo defeat the Portuguese.
- February 7 – France, Savoy and Venice sign the Treaty of Paris, agreeing to cooperate in removing Spanish forces from the strategic Alpine pass of Valtelline.
- February 25 – Thirty Years' War: Duke Maximilian I of Bavaria becomes Elector of the Electorate of the Palatinate.
- March 5 – The first American temperance law is enacted, in Virginia.
- March 7 – Charles, Prince of Wales, the future King Charles I of England, travelling incognito with royal favourite George Villiers, arrives in Madrid to pursue negotiations over the "Spanish match", the Protestant Charles's proposed marriage with the Catholic Habsburg Infanta Maria Anna of Spain.
- March 9 – Amboyna massacre: Ten English merchants in the service of the British East India Company, together with nine Japanese and one Portuguese, are executed by agents of the Dutch East India Company in Ambon, Maluku (Amboyna).
- March 14 – In the Korean kingdom of Joseon, Crown Prince Yi Ji is deposed and exiled to Ganghwa Island, where he dies soon after.
- March 20 – Richard Frethorne begins writing a letter to his parents from Jamestown, Virginia.

=== April–June ===
- April 11 – King Gwanghaegun of Joseon (in Korea) is deposed in the Injo coup and succeeded by King Injo.
- April 29 – A fleet of 11 Dutch ships depart for the coast of Peru, seeking to seize Spanish treasure.
- May 5 – Raja Gaj Singh of Marwar, along with Mahabat Khan and Parviz Mirza, is deputized by the Mughal Emperor Jahangir in India to hunt down Jahangir's rebel son, Shihab-ud-Din Muhammad Khurram. The search fails, and Khurram will become the Mughal Emperor Shah Jahan after Jahangir's death in 1627.
- May 8 – A Dutch East India Company party, led by explorer Jan Carstenszoon, fights a skirmish with 200 indigenous Australian Wik peoples.
- May 22 – After negotiations for the release of English women taken from Jamestown in the British North American colony of Virginia, conducted between Captain William Tucker of the English settlers and Chief Opchanacanough of the Powhatan Confederacy (Tsenacommacah), the English arrange a banquet with the Powhatan, and the drinking of wine. The wine is poisoned and many of the Powhatan Indians die, while 50 more are killed while ill. This follows the massacre of 347 English colonists of March 22, 1622, in the Powhatan uprising. Opchanacanough escapes, and the 20 women never return home.
- June 14 – The first breach-of-promise lawsuit: Rev. Gerville Pooley, in Virginia, files against Cicely Jordan, but loses.
- June 29 – Première of Pedro Calderón de la Barca's first play, Amor, honor y poder (Love, Honor and Power), at the Court of Habsburg Spain.

=== July–September ===
- July 8 – Pope Gregory XV (Alessandro Ludovisi) dies from a kidney ailment after a reign of a little more than two years.
- July 10 – The English ship Anne becomes the third vessel to bring settlers to Plymouth Colony, the Puritan settlement in modern-day Massachusetts, carrying more settlers, after the Mayflower on November 21, 1620, and the Fortune on November 9, 1621.
- July 15 – Trịnh Tùng is deposed as ruler of the kingdom of Đại Việt in northern Vietnam after more than 50 years. His son, Trịnh Xuan, burns the palace. Trinh Tung is carried away by his servants in a sedan chair and abandoned in the road to die. Another son, Trịnh Tráng, succeeds to the throne of Đại Việt.
- July 16 – A great conjunction of Jupiter and Saturn, with the planets only 5 arc minutes apart, the closest between 1226 and 2874. This conjunction likely goes unobserved, as it occurs near the Sun and the telescope has been invented only recently.
- July 30 (probable date) – The second Thanksgiving is celebrated in Plymouth Colony.
- August 5 – The English ship Little James arrives at Plymouth Colony, 26 days after the Anne.
- August 6
  - 1623 papal conclave: Pope Urban VIII (Maffeo Barberini) succeeds Pope Gregory XV, as the 235th pope.
  - Thirty Years' War: Pursued by the army of the Catholic League (German) led by Johann Tserclaes, Count of Tilly, the army of the Protestant Electoral Palatinate led by Christian the Younger of Brunswick attempts to flee to the Dutch Republic. Tilly's army catches Brunswick five miles from the border. In the resulting Battle of Stadtlohn, Christian's army is destroyed. This brings the Palatinate campaign to an end.
- August 30 – Negotiations, resumed in March, of the planned "Spanish match" break down. On October 5, Prince Charles returns to England from Spain without a bride.
- September 10 – Murat IV, age 11, succeeds his deposed uncle Mustafa I as Ottoman Emperor. Because Murat is a minor, his mother, Kösem Sultan, serves as regent until 1632.

=== October–December ===
- October 9 – Kara Mustafa Pasha is replaced as the Ottoman Governor of Egypt on orders of Sultan Murad IV.
- October 20 – Cardinal Antonio Marcello Barberini informs Galileo Galilei that his brother, the newly-enthroned Pope Urban VIII, wishes to receive a visit from Galileo.
- October 26 – "Fatal Vespers": 95 people are killed when an upper floor of the French ambassador's house in London collapses under the weight of a congregation attending a mass.
- November 1
  - The Battle of Anjar is fought in modern-day Lebanon as the Druze emir Fakhr al-Din II defeats an invasion by Mustafa Pasha al-Hannaq, the Ottoman Governor of Damascus, and takes him prisoner.
  - Fire at Plymouth Colony destroys several buildings.
- November 8–December 5 – Publication between these dates in London of the "First Folio" (Mr. William Shakespeares Comedies, Histories, & Tragedies), a collection of 36 of the plays of Shakespeare, half of which have not previously been printed.
- December 4 – 50 Christians are executed in Edo, Japan, during the Great Martyrdom of Edo.

=== Date unknown ===
- In British America:
  - On the coast of Massachusetts Bay, the settlement that will become the City of Gloucester, Massachusetts, is first inhabited by men from Dorchester, Dorset, England.
  - On the coast of New Hampshire, the settlement of Hilton's Point, which will become Dover, New Hampshire, is established by men from London, England, the first European settlers in the state.
- The 1623 Malta plague outbreak is contained after killing around 40 people on the island of Malta.
- Erotomania, a delusional disorder, is first mentioned, in a psychiatric treatise.
- Johannes Rudbeck founds Rudbeckianska gymnasiet, the first gymnasium in Sweden.
- Gabriel Bethlen, Prince of Transylvania, issues an order, dated at Kolozsvár/Klausenburg/Cluj, that allows Jews to settle, trade freely and practice religion in Transylvania, and exempts them from wearing the usual Jewish sign.
- Procopius' long-lost Secret History is rediscovered, in the Vatican Library.
- Italian poet Giambattista Marini's epic L'Adone is published in Paris.
- Imprisoned Italian Dominican philosopher Tommaso Campanella's utopian The City of the Sun is published in Latin (as Civitas Solis) in Frankfurt.
- Wilhelm Schickard devizes a Calculating Clock, an early mechanical calculator.
- Zildjian begins the commercial manufacture of cymbals in Turkey. The company will still be operating, from Massachusetts, in the 21st century.

=== January–March ===
- January 14 – After 90 years of Ottoman occupation, Baghdad is recaptured by the Safavid Empire.
- January 22 – Korean General Yi Gwal leads an uprising of 12,000 soldiers against King Injo in what is called then the Joseon Kingdom, and occupies Hanseong.
- January 24 – Afonso Mendes, appointed by Pope Gregory XV as Prelate of Ethiopia, arrives at Massawa from Goa.
- February 7 – (January 28, 1623/4 old style) England first colonizes Saint Kitts and Nevis.
- February 11 – Yi Gwal installs Prince Heungan, son of the late King Seongjo, to the Korean throne.
- February 15 – Yi Gwal's Rebellion ends as the rebels murder Yi Gwal at the town of Mukbang-ri.
- February 16 – Kara Mustafa Pasha becomes the Ottoman Governor of Egypt for the second time.
- February 19
  - King Filipe III of Portugal issues a decree prohibiting the enslavement of Chinese people in Portugal or in its colonies.
  - The last parliament of King James I of England begins its session.
- February 28 – A decree is issued in Norway making it illegal for Jesuits or Roman Catholic monks to be harbored in the country.
- March 2 – The English House of Commons passes a resolution making it illegal for a Member of Parliament (MP) to quit or willfully give up his seat. Afterward, MPs who wish to quit are appointed to an "office of profit", a legal fiction to allow a resignation.
- March 25 – In a ceremony, Ferdinand II, Holy Roman Emperor, renews his oath to restore Catholicism in Germany, Bohemia, Hungary and Croatia.

=== April–June ===
- April 13 – Garcia Mvemba a Nkanga is enthroned as King Garcia I of the southern African nation of Kongo (now in Angola), upon the death of his father, King Pedro II.
- April 15 – The University of Saint Francis Xavier is founded in Bolivia.
- April 29 – Louis XIII of France appoints Cardinal Richelieu to the Conseil du Roi (Royal Council).
- May 8 – Capture of Bahia: A Dutch West India Company fleet captures the Brazilian city of Salvador, Bahia from the Portuguese Empire (at this time in the Iberian Union).
- May 11 – a major earthquake in Fez, Morocco, estimated magnitude 6.0 M_{w}, causes severe damage and thousands of casualties.
- May 24
  - The city of Oslo, Norway, is destroyed by fire for the fourteenth time. King Christian IV of Denmark–Norway decrees its rebuilding on a new site, where it will be renamed Christiania.
  - After years of unprofitable operation, Virginia's charter is revoked, and it becomes a royal colony.
- May 25 – The Scottish city of Dunfermline is destroyed by fire, but The Abbey, The Palace, the Abbot House and many other buildings survive.
- May – The first Dutch settlers arrive in New Netherland; they disembark at Governors Island.
- June 10 – Treaty of Compiègne is signed between the Kingdom of France and the Dutch Republic.

=== July–September ===
- July 30 – A contingent of 5,000 Chinese troops and 50 warships under the command of Admiral Yu Zigao and General Wang Mengxiong attacks the Dutch fortress at the island of Magong, the largest of the Penghu islands under the command of Martinus Sonck. Outnumbered, the Dutch surrender in five days.
- August 4 – The Dutch East India Company agrees to Chinese demands to withdraw its operations from the Penghu islands, and relocates its trading post to Fort Zeelandia and the Dutch-controlled island of Formosa, now Tainan on Taiwan.
- August 5 – The King's Men perform Thomas Middleton's satire A Game at Chess at the Globe Theatre in London. The performances are suppressed on August 14 in view of the play's allusions to the Spanish Match.
- August 13 – Cardinal Richelieu is appointed by Louis XIII of France to be his chief minister, having intrigued against Charles de La Vieuville, Superintendent of Finances, arrested for corruption the previous day.
- August 24 – Jasper Vinall becomes the first person to die while playing the sport of cricket, after being struck on the head with a bat during a game at Horsted Keynes in England.
- August 28 – The Siege of Breda begins, and will continue for just over 9 months until June 5, 1625.
- August – Portuguese Jesuit priest António de Andrade becomes the first European to enter Tibet, arriving at Tsaparang.
- September 4 – The Parlement of Paris registers a decree forbidding the publication of criticism of "anciently approved authors" without prior approval from the Faculty of Theology of the University of Paris, on pain of death.
- September 13 – Ketevan, former queen consort of Kakheti (located around Gremi in what is now the Republic of Georgia), is tortured and killed in the Persian city of Shiraz after refusing to renounce Christianity to convert to Islam.
- September 19 – Michael I, the Tsar of Russia, is married at Moscow, making Maria Dolgorukova the Tsaritsa. Maria becomes ill shortly afterward and dies five months after the marriage, on January 17.
- September 21 – The Roman Catholic church's Dicastery for the Clergy issues a decree that no monk may be expelled from his order "unless he be truly incorrigible."

=== October–December ===
- October 3 – A combined squadron of fifteen Neapolitan (Spain), Tuscan, and Papal galleys defeat a squadron of six Algerian ships on the island of San Pietro, near Sardinia. (details)
- November 3 – Rodrigo Pacheco becomes the Viceroy of New Spain after arriving in Mexico City.
- December 24 – Denmark's first postal service is launched by order of King Christian IV.

=== Date unknown ===
- The Japanese shōgun expels the Spanish from Japan, and severs trade with the Philippines.
- Henry Briggs publishes Arithmetica Logarithmica.
- Jakob Bartsch first publishes a chart, showing the constellation Camelopardalis around the North Star.
- Queen Nzinga of Ndongo and Matamba starts to rule.
- Frans Hals produces the painting later known as the Laughing Cavalier.
- The German-language Luther Bible is publicly burned, by order of the Pope.
- A confrontation between Swedish and Danish councillors ends with a Swedish diplomatic victory due to Sweden's ability to mobilize quickly.

=== January–March ===
- January 17 – Led by the Duke of Soubise, the Huguenots launch a second rebellion against King Louis XIII, with a surprise naval assault on a French fleet being prepared in Blavet.
- February 3 – Francesca Caccini's opera La liberazione di Ruggiero has its premiere, stated in Florence in Italy. The opera will continue to be staged almost 400 years later, as late as the year 2018.
- February 6 – Bogislaw XIV becomes the final Duke of Pomerania, an office that becomes extinct after his death in 1637.
- February 8 – Hafız Ahmed Pasha is designated as the new grand vizier of the Ottoman Empire by Sultan Murad IV, 11 days after the death of Çerkes Mehmed Pasha.
- February 11 – Dutch–Portuguese War: The Battle of Hormuz, one of the largest naval battles ever fought in the Persian Gulf takes place in the Straits of Hormuz as fleets of the Dutch East India Company and the English East India Company defend Persia against an attack by ships from the colony of Portuguese India.
- February – Huguenot forces under the Duke of Soubise capture the Island of Ré.
- March 21 – James Ussher is appointed Archbishop of Armagh (Church of Ireland) and Primate of All Ireland.
- March 28–April 24 – First Savoine War – Relief of Genoa: The Spanish fleet aids the Republic of Genoa, by overcoming the Franco-Savoyard occupation of the city of Genoa.
- March 25 – Battle of Martqopi: The Safavids are defeated in Georgia.
- March 27 – Charles I of England, Scotland and Ireland succeeds to the throne on the death of his father, King James VI and I.

=== April–June ===
- April 4 – Frederick Henry of Nassau marries Amalia, Countess von Solms-Braunfels.
- April 7 – Albrecht von Wallenstein is appointed German supreme commander of the armies of Holy Roman Emperor Ferdinand II.
- April 23 – Stadtholder Maurice of Nassau of the Dutch Republic dies, and is succeeded by his younger brother, Frederick Henry.
- May 1 – A Portuguese-Spanish expedition recaptures Salvador, Bahia (Bahia) from the Dutch.
- May 15–16 – Rebellious farmers are hanged in Vocklamarkt, Upper Austria.
- June 2 – Prince Frederick Henry is sworn in as the stadtholder of Holland and Zeeland.
- June 5 – Eighty Years' War: Spanish troops under Ambrogio Spinola conquer Breda, after a nine-month siege.
- June 13 – King Charles I of England marries Catholic princess Henrietta Maria of France and Navarre, at Canterbury.
- June 18 – The English Parliament refuses to vote Charles I the right to collect customs duties for his entire reign, restricting him to one year instead.

=== July–September ===
- July 1 – The Safavid Empire in Iran defeats an invasion from the Kingdom of Georgia in the Battle of Marabda with heavy losses on both sides, including the Georgian commander, Teimuraz I, Prince of Mukhrani. when the Iranian Safavid army defeated a Georgian force.
- July – The Barbary pirates first attack south-western England. In August they enslave about 60 people from Mount's Bay in Cornwall.
- August 6 – Ernest Casimir of Nassau-Dietz is appointed as stadtholder of Groningen.
- August 16 – Ernest Casimir of Nassau-Dietz is appointed stadtholder of Drenthe.
- September 7 – The Treaty of Southampton makes an alliance between England and the Dutch Republic, against Spain.
- September 13 – A total of 16 rabbis (including Isaiah Horowitz) are imprisoned in Jerusalem.
- September 15 – After several skirmishes in the preceding days, troops under the Marquis of Toiras successfully recapture the island of Ré, forcing the Duke of Soubise to flee to England, and ending the second Huguenot rebellion.
- September 24 – A Dutch fleet attacks San Juan, Puerto Rico.

=== October–December ===
- October 25 – A Dutch fleet attacks the Portuguese garrison at Elmina castle at modern-day Elmina, Ghana, but is defeated with heavy casualties. This defeat, along with the defeats at Bahia and Puerto Rico, causes a five-year-long lull in Dutch attacks on Spanish and Portuguese colonies.
- November 1–7 – Cádiz Expedition: English forces commanded by Admiral George Villiers (which set out from Plymouth on October 8) are decisively defeated by the Spanish at Cádiz.
- December 9 – Thirty Years' War: The Netherlands and England sign the Treaty of The Hague, a military peace treaty for providing economical aid to King Christian IV of Denmark-Norway, during his military campaigns in Germany.

=== Date unknown ===
- The Dutch settle Manhattan, founding the town of New Amsterdam. The town will transform into a piece of New York City.
- The capital of Madagascar, Antananarivo, is founded by King Andrianjaka.
- In England, a very high tide occurs, the highest ever known in the Thames, and the sea walls in Kent, Essex, and Lincolnshire are overthrown, thus great desolation is caused to the lands near the sea.
- An English colony is established in Barbados.
- The first members of the Society of Jesus move to Quebec, Canada.
- Approximate date – Shyaam a-Mbul begins to unify the Kuba Kingdom in Central Africa.

=== January–March ===
- January 7 – Polish-Swedish War: Battle of Wallhof in Latvia – Gustavus Adolphus, King of Sweden, defeats a Polish army.
- January 9 – Peter Minuit sails from Texel Island for America's New Netherland colony, with two ships of Dutch emigrants.
- February 2 – King Charles I of England is crowned, but without his wife, Henrietta Maria, who declines to participate in a non-Catholic ceremony.
- February 5 – The Huguenot rebels and the French government sign the Treaty of Paris, ending the second Huguenot rebellion.
- February 10 – Battle of Ningyuan: In Xingcheng in China, after an 8-day battle, Ming dynasty commander Yuan Chonghuan defeats the much larger force of Manchu leader Nurhaci, who dies soon after and is succeeded by Huang Taiji.
- February 11 – Emperor Susenyos of Ethiopia and Patriarch Afonso Mendes declare the primacy of the Roman See over the Ethiopian Church, and Roman Catholicism the state religion of Ethiopia.
- March 5 – The Treaty of Monzón is signed between France and Spain to end the Valtellina War and the First Genoese-Savoyard War.
- March 7 – Ambrósio I Nimi a Nkanga becomes the new monarch of Kongo (in what is now Angola) after the overthrow of Garcia I Mvemba a Nkanga, restoring the Kwilu dynasty to power.
- March 15 – Portugal declares war on Queen Nzinga of the Kingdom of Ndongo, located in what is now Angola.
- A dam failure causes the sudden flooding of the mining city of Potosí in present-day Bolivia leading to the death of thousands and the massive release of toxic mercury into the environment.

=== April–June ===
- April 25 – Thirty Years' War: Battle of Dessau Bridge – Albrecht von Wallenstein defeats Ernst von Mansfelds army.
- May 4 – Peter Minuit becomes director-general of New Netherland, for the Dutch West India Company.
- May 24 – Peter Minuit buys Manhattan from a Native American tribe (Lenape or Shinnecock) for trade goods, valued at 60 guilders ($1,143 U.S. dollars as of 2020).
- May 30 – Wanggongchang Explosion in Beijing, China: a gunpowder factory explosion destroys part of the city and kills 20,000 people.
- June 15 – King Charles I of England dissolves the English Parliament.
- June 20 – Nine Jesuit Christian missionaries, six of them Japanese and three from Spain, are executed in Japan, followed by eight Japanese converts to Christianity on July 12.
- June 28 – A 7.0 magnitude earthquake strikes Lingqiu County, in China, killing 5,200 residents.

=== July–September ===
- July 4 – The Ottoman Army halts its attempt to retake Baghdad from the Persians, after having lost it in 1624.
- July 27 – George II becomes the new Landgrave of Hesse-Darmstadt upon the death of his father, Louis V.
- August 1 – Eighty Years' War: Ernst Casimir of Nassau-Dietz retakes Oldenzaal, forcing the Army of Flanders to withdraw from Overijssel.
- August 27 – Thirty Years' War: Battle of Lutter – Tilly defeats King Christian IV of Denmark's army.
- September 30 – Nurhaci, chief of the Jurchens and founder of the Qing dynasty, dies and is succeeded by his son Hong Taiji.

=== October–December ===
- November 6 (O.S.) – The ship Arms of Amsterdam arrives in Europe from New Netherland (left September 23) with the news: "They have purchased the Island Manhattes [Manhattan] from the Indians for the value of 60 guilders."
- November 18 – The new St Peter's Basilica in the Vatican is consecrated, on the 1,300th anniversary of the previous church in 326.
- December 1 – Pasha Muhammad ibn Farukh, tyrannical Governor of Jerusalem, is forced out.
- December 20 – Ferdinand II, Holy Roman Emperor and Transylvanian monarch Bethlen Gabor sign the Peace of Pressburg.

=== Date unknown ===
- 1626 influenza pandemic begins in Asia, then spreads into Europe, Africa, North America, and South America.
- The Würzburg and Bamberg witch trials, which will lead to the mass executions of hundreds of people until 1630/31, begin.
- Samuel de Champlain decides to build Cap tourmente (Kap toor-mont) Farm to raise livestock to provide food for settlers in Quebec, rather than depending on supplies sent from France.
- Establishment of the coastal settlement of Salem, Massachusetts.

=== January–March ===
- January 26 – The Dutch ship 't Gulden Zeepaert, skippered by François Thijssen, makes the first recorded European sighting of the coast of South Australia.
- February 15 – The administrative rural parish of Iisalmi (Swedish: Idensalmi) is established in Savonia, by order of King Gustavus Adolphus of Sweden.
- February 17 – England lands the first European settlers on Barbados.
- March 3 – After the First Manchu invasion of Korea, the Joseon dynasty of Korea becomes a tributary state of the Manchus, but still pays respects to the Ming dynasty of China. After rejecting a Manchu alteration to the original diplomatic terms in 1636, the Manchus invade again in 1637.
- March 17 – Maurice, Landgrave of Hesse-Kassel, is forced to abdicate after his spending brings Hesse-Kassel to bankruptcy. His son takes over as William V and cedes much of the landgravate in September to bring peace in its war against Hesse-Darmstadt.
- March – Start of the Trịnh–Nguyễn War in modern-day Vietnam: Trịnh Tráng leads an army of 200,000 troops southward to attack the Đàng Trong governed by Lord Nguyễn Phúc Nguyên.

=== April–June ===
- April 10 – The 't Gulden Zeepaert reaches Batavia in the Dutch East Indies.
- April 17 – The States of Friesland agree on the 28-point Appeal about Abuses after allowing the citizens to voice their complaints.
- May 10 – The Kingdom of England reaches an agreement with Sidi Al-Ayyashi, a Moroccan Mujahidin leader to obtain his help in releasing English captives seized by Barbary corsairs.
- May 13 – France and England sign an agreement on dividing the island of Saint Kitts.
- May 23 – Ngarolamo becomes the new Sultan of Tidore in the Maluku Islands in modern-day Indonesia.
- June 15 – The States of Friesland promulgate the Resolution on the April 17 appeal about abuses.
- June 20
  - Hinchingbrooke House in the east of England is sold by Sir Oliver Cromwell, to Sidney Montagu.
  - Turkish Abductions: Barbary corsairs from Salé raid the fishing village of Grindavík in Iceland and take captives into slavery, the first of several raids.

=== July–September ===
- July 5–13 – Turkish Abductions: Barbary corsairs from Algiers raid the East Fjords of Iceland and take captives into slavery.
- July 16 – Turkish Abductions: the Barbary corsairs from Algiers raid the island of Heimaey off Iceland, take captives into slavery and kill others.
- July 20 – Eighty Years' War: Frederick Henry, Prince of Orange, begins the Siege of Grol, the last Spanish stronghold in the eastern Netherlands, and captures it after 30 days.
- July 22 – The English, under the Duke of Buckingham, invade the Île de Ré off the coast of France in support of the Huguenots in La Rochelle; the invasion fails.
- July 27 – An earthquake destroys the cities of San Severo and Torremaggiore in southern Italy.
- August 16 – In a persecution of Christians in Japan, 14 Franciscan missionaries and converts are killed.
- August 19 – Eighty Years' War: Grol, in the Spanish Netherlands, is captured after the siege started on July 20 by Prince Frederick Henry.
- September 10 – The Siege of La Rochelle begins as the Roman Catholic nations of France and Spain move to suppress the revolt of Protestant Huguenots in the western French city.
- September 12 – Mohammed Adil Shah begins his reign as the new Sultan of Bijapur in south India, after the death of his father, Ibrahim Adil Shah II.
- September 24 – William V, Landgrave of Hesse-Kassel, landgrave of the German state Hesse-Kassel, signs the Hauptakkord with George II of Hesse-Darmstadt, ceding much of its territory.
- September 30 – The reign of China's 21-year old ruler, the Ming dynasty Tianqi Emperor, Zhu Youjiao, ends after seven years.

=== October–December ===
- October 2 – The Tianqi Emperor's 16-year-old brother, Zhu Youjian, is enthroned as the Chongzhen Emperor.
- October 28 – The Mughal Emperor Jahangir dies of a respiratory illness near Bhimber while attempting to return to his palace at Lahore.
- November 7 – Shahryar Mirza, the 22-year-old son of Jahangir and son-in-law of Jahangir's widow Nur Jahan, is installed as the new Mughal Emperor at Lahore.
- November 20 – Thirty Years' War: Bogislaw XIV, Duke of Pomerania, signs the Capitulation of Franzburg, in which Pomerania is forced to pay for the Imperial army that Wallenstein sent to occupy it. Nonetheless, despite the treaty, Pomerania is devastated by the Imperial troops.
- November 28 – Polish-Swedish War: Battle of Oliwa – A Polish-Lithuanian fleet defeats a Swedish fleet.
- December 18 – La selva sin amor (The Forest without Love), written by Lope de Vega and with music by Alessandro Piccinini, premieres as the first Spanish opera.
- December 25 – Vincenzo II Gonzaga, Duke of Mantua, dies of poor health at the age of 33. Charles I Gonzaga becomes the Duke over the objections of Charles Emmanuel I of Savoy, leading to the War of the Mantuan Succession.
- December 27 – In Madrid, ministers of King Philip IV of Spain, draw up proposals for a "Kingdom and Republic of Ireland" that would break with England, to have two Captains General to be executives of the Republic.
- December 30 (Jumada-l awwal 2, 1037 AH) – Shihab-ud-Din Muhammad Khurram, son of the later Emperor Jahangir, enters Lahore after defeating his brother Shahryar Mirza. He is proclaimed as Shah Jahan.

=== Date unknown ===
- Habsburg Spain suffers an economic collapse.
- The last recorded aurochs die in the Jaktorów Forest of Poland.
- Rock blasting is invented: Black gunpowder is first used in mining, in a mineshaft under Banská Štiavnica, Slovakia.

=== January–March ===
- January 19 – (26 Jumada I 1037 A.H.) The reign of Salef-ud-din Muhammad Shahryar as the Mughal Emperor, Shahryar Mirza, comes to an end a little more than two months after the November 7 death of his father, Jahangir, as Sharyar's older brother, Shihab defeats him in battle. Prince Shihab-ud-Din Muhammad Khurram takes the name Shah Jahan and sentences Shahryar and other members of the court to death.
- January 23 – After being incarcerated and blinded on orders of his brother, former Mughal Emperor Shahryar Mirza is put to death, along with his nephews, co-ruler Dawar Bakhsh, and Princes Garshasp, Tahmuras and Hoshang.
- February 3 – In what is now the South American nation of Chile, the indigenous Mapuche lay siege to the Spanish colonial settlement of Nacimiento. The Spanish captain and a force of 40 men are able to hold out until reinforcements arrive two days later, but the attackers take muskets and two cannons.
- February 5 – The Chongzhen Era begins in Ming dynasty China after the October 2 ascension of Zhu Youjian, the Chongzhen Emperor, on the first day of the Chinese New Year, and the Tianqi era formally ends.
- February 10 – King Gustavus Adolphus of Sweden issues an order bringing an end to the "foolishness and insanity" ("dårskap och galenskap") of religious visionary Margareta i Kumla, prohibiting Swedes from making pilgrimages to see her on pain of imprisonment, and threatening her with incarceration if she continues to preach about her visions from the angels.
- February 14 – The coronation of Shah Jahan as ruler of the Mughal Empire takes place in Agra.
- March 1 – Writs issued in February, by King Charles I, require every county in England (not just seaport towns) to pay ship tax by this date.
- March 17 – Oliver Cromwell makes his first appearance in the English Parliament, as Member for Huntingdon.

=== April–June ===
- April 6 – Damat Halil Pasha is fired from his position as Grand Vizier of the Ottoman Empire by Sultan Murad IV after failing again to suppress the rebellion started by Abaza Mehmed Pasha or to win the war of the Ottomans against Persia. Halil is replaced by Gazi Hüsrev Pasha.
- April 8 – A decree of the Sacred Congregation of Rites of the Roman Catholic Church is made to prohibit the veneration of saints whose sanctity has not been declared by the Holy See.
- April 21 – Generalissimo Albrecht von Wallenstein of the Holy Roman Empire is made Admiral of the Baltic Sea by Emperor Ferdinand II.
- April 26 – Cardinal Girolamo Grimaldi-Cavalleroni is appointed as the Governor of Rome by Pope Urban VIII.
- May 5 – Catholic League Field Marshal Johann Tserclaes, Count of Tilly, succeeds in taking control of the German city of Stade after a long siege. Tilly allows the remaining 3,500 Danish and English defenders safe passage out of Germany, and captures most of the Duchy of Bremen except for the city of Bremen itself, which he turns to next.
- May 13
  - In North America, Matthew Cradock is elected by shareholders as the first Governor of the Massachusetts Bay Company.
  - Thirty Years' War: As a result of its refusal to accept the capitulation of Franzburg, the siege of Stralsund is begun by Field Marshals Hans Georg von Arnim-Boitzenburg and Wallenstein's of the Holy Roman Imperial Army, and lasts until August 4.
- May 21 – (17 Ramadan 1037 AH) Muhsin ibn Husayn, Emir of Mecca and King of Hejaz, surrenders control to Ahmad ibn Abd al-Muttalib.
- May 31 – Mehmed III Giray, the Khan of Crimea, is forced to leave after an invasion of 4,000 Cossacks and a four week siege of the capital Bakhchysarai. The attack is led by Mykhailo Doroshenko, who is killed in the battle.
- June 7 – King Charles I reconvenes the English Parliament, and accepts the Petition of Right as a concession to gain his subsidies.

=== July–September ===
- July 9 – Prince Minyedeippa assassinates his father, Anaukpetlun, King of Burma and takes over the throne upon the death of his father. Minyedeippa is arrested by the palace guards a year later and turned over to Anaukpetlun's brother, Thalun, for execution.
- August 4 – Thirty Years' War: With the help of Danish and Swedish reinforcements, Stralsund is able to resist Wallenstein's siege until the landing of a Danish army, led by Christian IV of Denmark, forces Wallenstein to raise the siege, and move his army to confront the new threat.
- August 10 – The Swedish 64-gun sailing ship Vasa sinks 20 minutes into her maiden voyage, in Stockholm Harbor.
- August 22 – Sultan Agung of Mataram (located on the island of Java sends a fleet of ships to besiege the Dutch fort at Batavia (now Jakarta, Indonesia). The siege fails after four months.
- August 23 – English courtier George Villiers, the first Duke of Buckingham, is assassinated by John Felton.
- September 2 – Thirty Years' War – Battle of Wolgast: Wallenstein defeats Christian IV of Denmark's army.
- September 6 – Puritans settle Salem, which will later become part of Massachusetts Bay Colony.
- September 7–8 – Eighty Years' War – Battle in the Bay of Matanzas: Dutch admiral Piet Hein captures 16 ships of the Spanish treasure fleet. The immense booty taken brings in over 11 million guilders, part of which is used to fund the entire army of the Dutch Republic for eight months.
- September 8 – In a persecution of Christians in Japan, 21 Christian converts are executed on the same day.

=== October–December ===
- October 22 – Abaza Mehmed Pasha surrenders to Ottoman forces, ending the Abaza rebellion.
- October 28 – The siege of La Rochelle ends with the surrender of the Huguenots.
- November 29 – English Army Lieutenant John Felton, who stabbed the Duke of Buckingham to death on August 23, is hanged at Tyburn prison.
- December 3 – The attempt by the Mataram Sultanate to drive the Dutch East India Company from the western part of the island of Java fails after 103 days.
- December 11 – Muhammad Imaduddin I becomes the Sultan of Maldives and reigns for the next 29 years.
- December 12 – At the age of 15, Chetthathirat is crowned as the new King of Thailand upon the death of his father, Intharacha III. Prince Chetthathirat takes the regnal name of Borommaracha II and is killed less than a year later.
- December 16 – In the Joseon Kingdom of Korea, O Yun-gyeom becomes the new Yeonguijeong (Chief of the State Council, similar to Prime Minister) during the reign of King Injo.

=== Date unknown ===
- The War of the Mantuan Succession breaks out over Mantua and Montferrat. The war is fought between the Duke of Savoy, who is supported by Spain, and the Duke of Nevers, who is supported by France.
- William Harvey publishes Exercitatio Anatomica de Motu Cordis et Sanguinis in Animalibus in Frankfurt, containing his findings about blood circulation.
- Publication of Sir Edward Coke's Institutes of the Lawes of England begins with A Commentary upon Littleton. This will remain an influential legal text on both sides of the Atlantic for three centuries.
- The Collegiate School, the oldest surviving educational institution in the United States, is established.
- The first black slaves arrive in Dutch Manhattan.

=== January–March ===
- January 8 – Frederick Henry, Hereditary Prince of the Palatinate, the 15-year-old son of the German Palatinate elector, Frederick V, drowns in an accident while sailing to Amsterdam.
- January 19 – Abbas the Great, one of the greatest rulers in Iranian history and the most powerful of the Safavid dynasty Shahs, dies after a reign of more than 40 years.
- January 28 – Sam Mirza, son of the late Mohammad Baqer Mirza and grandson of Abbas the Great, is crowned as the new Shah of Persia and takes the regnal name Safi.
- February 11 – Puritan migration to New England (1620–1640): Around 350 English Puritans on six ships, led by Francis Higginson in the Lyon's Whelp, sail from Yarmouth, Isle of Wight, heading to the Massachusetts Bay Colony in America. They arrive on June 19.
- March 4 – Massachusetts Bay Colony is granted a royal charter, and the colony is the first to be created in what will become the United States 150 years later, covering almost all of what will be the U.S. state of Massachusetts.
- March 6 – Ferdinand II, Holy Roman Emperor issues the Edict of Restitution, ordering all Catholic properties lost to Protestantism since 1552 to be restored. The Edict further provides that Catholics and Lutherans (but not Calvinists, Hussites or members of other sects) are to be allowed to practice their faith.
- March 10 – Charles I of England dissolves Parliament, starting the Eleven Years' Tyranny

=== April–June ===
- April 30 – Eighty Years' War: Frederick Henry, Prince of Orange lays siege to 's-Hertogenbosch, one of Spain's most important fortresses along the Spanish–Dutch border.
- May 14–28 – Huguenot rebellions: After a 15-day siege, Louis XIII of France captures Privas.
- May 22 – Thirty Years' War: Christian IV of Denmark and Albrecht von Wallenstein sign the Treaty of Lübeck, ending Denmark's involvement in the Thirty Years' War.
- May 29 – Thirty Years' War: Prince Frederick of Denmark, the Lutheran administrator of the Prince-Bishopric of Verden, is expelled by the Catholic League as a result of the Edict of Restitution. He is replaced by the staunch catholic Francis of Wartenberg.
- June 4 – The Dutch East India Company ship Batavia is wrecked on a reef near Beacon Island, off Western Australia, on her maiden voyage to the Indies. Following mutiny among the survivors, two exiled murderers become the first Europeans to settle in Australia. Their subsequent fate is unknown.
- June 7 – The Dutch States-General ratifies the Dutch West India Company's Charter of Freedoms and Exemptions, making it more attractive to invest in the colony of New Netherland in North America.
- June 17
  - Huguenot rebellions: Alès surrenders after an intense siege. As a result, the leader of the Huguenot Rebellions, the Duke of Rohan, surrenders.
  - Anglo-Spanish War (1625–1630): A Spanish expedition, led by Fadrique de Toledo, wipes out the English colony on Nevis.
- June 19 – Puritan migration to New England (1620–1640): The six ships of Puritans, led by Francis Higginson in the Lyon's Whelp, arrive in America at Salem, to settle in the Massachusetts Bay Colony.
- June 28 – Huguenot rebellions: Louis XIII of France signs in his camp at Lédignan the Peace of Alès, ending the Huguenot rebellions. The Huguenots are allowed religious freedom, but lose their political, territorial and military rights.

=== July–September ===
- July 19 – Anglo-French War (1627–1629): New France's Samuel de Champlain surrenders the city of Quebec to an English force led by David Kirke.
- July 20 – In Morocco, the city of Salé is bombarded by French Admiral Isaac de Razilly with a fleet composed of the ships Licorne, Saint-Louis, Griffon, Catherine, Hambourg, Sainte-Anne, Saint-Jean; his forces destroyed three corsair ships
- July 24 – Later Jin invasion of Joseon: In the Kingdom of Joseon (now Korea), Mao Wenlong is executed for smuggling and other crimes after being captured by Ming Chinese general Yuan Chonghuan.
- August 19 – Eighty Years' War: The Spanish garrison of Wesel is surprised by a small Dutch army, and the city is taken by the Dutch Republic. As Wesel functioned as the principal supply base of Hendrik van den Bergh's army, the loss of supply forces him to retreat to the Spanish Netherlands, leaving him unable to intervene in the ongoing siege of 's-Hertogenbosch.
- August 21 – Huguenot rebellions: Montauban, one of the last Huguenot strongholds, surrenders without a fight to Richelieu's troops.
- August 26 – The Cambridge Agreement is signed in the Massachusetts Bay Colony in America, providing for the colony to be under the control of stockholders who actually emigrate to New England.
- August 29 – As a result of the Cambridge Agreement, the Massachusetts Bay Colony becomes a self-governing entity.
- September 7 – Anglo-Spanish War (1625–1630): A Spanish expedition, led by Fadrique de Toledo, wipes out the English colony on St. Kitts.
- September 14 – Eighty Years' War: After a five-month-long siege, 's-Hertogenbosch surrenders to Frederick Henry. As a result of the capture of this key fortress, Spain's situation along the Spanish–Dutch border worsens greatly.
- September 20 – 1629–1631 Italian plague: the plague arrives in the nation-state of Milan as German soldiers are granted a stay at the Forte di Fuentes.
- September 22 – (5 Safar 1039 AH) Ahmad ibn Abd al-Muttalib, who had become Emir of Mecca and King of the Hejaz by force 16 months earlier, is assassinated by order of Kansuh Pasha, Governor of Yemen.
- September 25 – Polish–Swedish War (1626–1629): Sweden and the Polish–Lithuanian Commonwealth sign the Truce of Altmark, ending the war in highly favourable terms for Sweden.

=== October–December ===
- October 2 – In what is now the state of Western Australia, administered at the time by the Dutch East India Company, seven members of the crew of the Batavia are hanged on the Abrolhos Islands for their massacre of 125 passengers and crew.
- October 24 – Portuguese Navy Captain Pedro Teixeira leads 2,000 men in the capture of Fort Taurege from England in what is now Brazil.
- November 30 – The St Etienne baronets British nobility title is created.
- December 22 – (Kan'ei 6, 8th day of the 11th month) Emperor Go-Mizunoo of Japan abdicates the throne in favor of his daughter, Princess Okiko, who becomes Empress Meishō.
- December 23 – Giovanni I Cornaro, Doge of the Republic of Venice since 1625, dies and is succeeded by Nicolò Contarini.

=== Undated ===
- Fort Santo Domingo is built in Formosa by the Spanish East Indies.
- Chongzhen, the Chinese emperor of the Ming dynasty, reiterates the state prohibition against female infanticide, while the empire and the Chinese economy begins to crumble. In the same year, a third of the courier stations are closed down due to lack of government funds to sustain them.
- The rule of Nzinga of Ndongo and Matamba ends.
- Actresses are banned in Japan.
- William Alexander, 1st Earl of Stirling briefly establishes a Scottish colony at Port Royal, Nova Scotia.

== Significant people ==
- Antonio Maria Abbatini of Rome (c.1595–1680), composer
- George Abbot of England (1562–1633), Archbishop of Canterbury, held position 1611–1633
- Diego Sarmiento de Acuña, 1st Count of Gondomar of Spain (1567–1626), Spanish ambassador to England-Wales
- Thomas Adams of England (1566–1620), publisher
- Niccolò Alamanni of Rome (1583–1626), Catholic priest, antiquarian, and custodian of the Vatican Library
- Albert VII (1559–1621), Archduke of Austria and governor (1596–1598) and Co-sovereign of the Spanish Netherlands (modern-day Belgium and Luxembourg) with Infanta Isabella Clara Eugenia of Spain, held position (as Co-sovereign) 1598–1621
- William Alexander, 1st Earl of Stirling of Scotland (1570–1640), Scottish colonial organizer of Nova Scotia and Secretary for Scotland
- Alexander III of Imereti (1609–1660), Imeretian Prince and future King of Imereti
- Manuel de Almeida of Portugal (1580–1646), Jesuit Missionary and ambassador to the Emperor of Ethiopia
- Emilio Bonaventura Altieri of Rome (1590–1676), Catholic bishop and future Pope
- Giambattista Andreini of Tuscany (1576–1654), actor and playwright
- Giovanni Andrea Ansaldo of Genoa (1584–1638), painter
- Sir Samuel Argall (1580–1626), former deputy governor of Virginia and current naval officer in the English navy
- Abdul Hasan Asaf-Khan of Persia (?-1641), Grand Vizer of the Mughal Empire (and brother of Nur Jahan), in office c.1611–1632
- Sir Thomas Aylesbury, 1st Baronet of England (1576–1657), Baronet and Surveyor of the English Royal Navy
- Francis Bacon of England (1561–1626), philosopher, jurist, scientist, writer, and politician; specifically Member of Parliament, Attorney General for England and Wales (1613–1617), and Lord Chancellor (1617–1621)
- Nathaniel Bacon of England (1585–1627), painter (not to be confused with the leader of the same name of Bacon's Rebellion)
- William Baffin of England (?–1622), navigator and explorer
- Francesco Barberini (1597–1679), seniore of Florence, Cardinal, diplomat
- Jakob Bartsch of Lusatia (1600–1633), astronomer
- François de Bassompierre of France (1579–1646), courtier and Marshal of France
- Robert Bellarmine (1542–1621), Italian Jesuit and Cardinal
- Bernard of Saxe-Weimar (1604–1639), nobleman and general
- Pierre de Bérulle of France (1575–1629), Cardinal and diplomat
- Maximilien de Béthune, duc de Sully of France (1560–1641), Favourite and minister under Henry IV and Louis XIII
- Andries Bicker of the Netherlands (1586–1652), administrator of the Dutch East India Company, Mayor of Amsterdam, and diplomat
- Willem Blaeu of the Netherlands (1571–1638), cartographer and publisher
- Abraham Bloemaert of the Netherlands (1566–1651), painter and printmaker
- Jakob Böhme of Görlitz (1575–1624), Christian mystic
- Juan Pablo Bonet of Spain (c.1573-1633), Catholic priest and inventor of the sign language alphabet
- François de Bonne, duc de Lesdiguières of France (1543–1626), Constable of France
- Sidonia von Borcke of Pomerania (1548–1620), noblewoman and Witch-hunt victim (as well as a figure of later legends)
- Federico Borromeo of Milan (1564–1631), Cardinal and Archbishop of Milan
- Richard Boyle, 1st Earl of Cork (1566–1643), Anglo-Irish politician
- William Bradford (1590–1657), Prominent Leader and Governor of the Plymouth colony, in office 1621–1633, 1635–1636, 1637–1638, 1639–1644, 1645–1657
- Jean de Brébeuf of France (1593–1649), Jesuit missionary
- William Brewster (c.1566-1644), Puritan preacher and Plymouth leader
- Henry Briggs of England (1561–1630), mathematician
- Étienne Brûlé of France (1592?–1633), explorer
- John Bull of England (1562?-1628), composer and musician
- Karel Bonaventura Buquoy of France (1571–1621), general in the service of the Holy Roman Empire
- Robert Burton of England (1577–1640), scholar
- Estêvão Cacella of Portugal (1585–1630), Jesuit missionary
- Pedro Calderón de la Barca of Spain (1600–1681), playwright and poet
- George Calvert, 1st Baron Baltimore of England (1579–1632), nobleman, Member of Parliament, Secretary of State, and English colonizer of the North America (most notably the founder of the Province of Avalon in Newfoundland and future founder of Maryland)
- William Camden of England (1551–1623), historian and topographer
- Tommaso Campanella (1568–1639), Italian philosopher, theologian, astrologer, and poet
- John Carver (1576?-1621), Leader and First Governor of the Plymouth Colony, in office 1620–1621
- Henry Cary, 1st Viscount Falkland of England (1575–1633), military officer, colonizer, and Lord Lieutenant of Ireland
- Ernst Casimir of the Netherlands (1573–1632), nobleman and military commander
- Aodh Mac Cathmhaoil of Ireland (1571–1626), Catholic theologian and Archbishop of Armagh
- Samuel de Champlain (1570?–1635), French explorer, administrator of New France, and founder of Quebec City
- Charles I of Gonzaga-Nevers (1580–1637), Duke of Nevers and Mantua (claim for the later supported by France)
- Charles Emmanuel I of Savoy (1562–1630), Duke of Savoy and Papal backed candidate to the throne of the Duchy of Mantua
- Ivan Cherkassky of Russia (1580?-1642), boyar and head of the Treasury, Streletsky Prikaz and Aptekarsky Prikaz, in office 1621–1622 (as Treasurer), 1622–23 (as head of the Streletsky Prikaz and Aptekarsky Prikaz)
- Jan Karol Chodkiewicz of Poland (1560–1621), military commander
- Christian the Younger of Brunswick (1599–1626), Duke of Brunswick-Lüneburg and Protestant Commander
- Antonio Cifra of Rome (1584–1629), composer
- Jan Pieterszoon Coen of the Netherlands (1587–1629), Governor-General of the Dutch East Indies
- Sir Edward Coke of England (1552–1634), Jurist and Member of Parliament
- Sir John Coke of England (1563–1644), Member of Parliament and Secretary of State
- Nicolò Contarini of Venice (1553–1631), politician and future Doge of Venice
- Diego Fernández de Córdoba, Marquis of Guadalcázar of Spain (1578–1630), nobleman and Viceroy of New Spain and Peru, in office 1612–1621 (New Spain), 1622–1629 (Peru)
- Gregorio Nuñez Coronel of Portugal (1548–1620), Augustinian theologian, writer, and preacher
- Adam de Coster of Flanders (1586–1643), painter
- Nathaniel Courthope of England (1585–1620), merchant navy officer
- Thomas Coventry, 1st Baron Coventry of England (1578–1640), Judge, Member of Parliament, and politician (specifically Soliticar General (1617–1621), Attorney General (1621–1625), and Lord Chancellor (1625–1640))
- Oliver Cromwell of England (1599–1658), Member of Parliament, general, and future ruler of England-Wales, Scotland, and Ireland
- Sir Sackville Crowe, 1st Baronet of England (1595–1671), baronet, Treasurer of the Navy, Member of Parliament, and future ambassador
- Alfonso de la Cueva, marqués de Bedmar of Spain (1572–1655), diplomat and Catholic theologian
- Robert Cushman of England (1578–1625), Plymouth colony organizer
- Cyril I (1572–1638), Ecumenical Patriarch of Constantinople, held position in 1612, 1620–1623, 1623–1633, 1633–1634, 1634–1635, 1637–1638
- Daišan of Manchuria (1583–1648), Manchurian prince (brother of Huang Taiji) and military commander
- Mir Damad of Persia (?–1631), philosopher
- John Danvers of England (1588–1655), courtier and politician
- Date Masamune of Japan (1567–1636), Daimyō of Sendai
- John Davies of England (1569–1626), lawyer, poet, and politician (specifically Attorney General of Ireland, Member of Parliament, and Judge)
- John Davies (AKA Mallwyd) of Wales (1567–1644), scholar, translator, and Anglican priest
- Dawar of India (?–1628), Mughal Prince
- Thomas Dekker of England (1572–1632), playwright and poet
- Joseph Solomon Delmedigo (1591–1655), Italian rabbi, author, physician, mathematician, and music theorist
- Thomas Dempster of Scotland (1579–1625), scholar and historian
- Robert Devereux, 3rd Earl of Essex of England (1591–1646), nobleman and military commander
- Kenelm Digby of England (1603–1665), courtier, diplomat, privateer, and philosopher
- John Donne of England (1571?–1631), Anglican priest, poet, and philosopher
- Michael Drayton of England (1563–1631), poet
- Cornelius Drebbel of the Netherlands (1572–1633), inventor
- Jeremias Drexel of Bavaria (1581–1638), Catholic theologian and Court Preacher at the court of Prince-Elector Maximilian I
- Robert Dudley of England (1574–1649), explorer and geographer
- Pierre Dupuy of France (1582–1651), scholar
- Mar Elia Shimun X, Patriarch of the Chaldean Catholic Church (Patriarchate then based in Salamas, in modern-day Iran. However a later Patriarch, Mar Shimun XIII Dinkha, broke the union with the Catholic Church, thus he and other Patriarchs of the Shimun line are sometimes list as Patriarchs of the Assyrian Church of the East), held position 1600–1653
- Sir John Eliot of England (1592–1632), Vice-Admiral of Devon and Member of Parliament
- Mar Eliyya IX, Patriarch of the Assyrian Church of the East (Patriarchate then based in Alqosh, in modern-day Iraq), held position in 1617–1660
- John Endecott (1588?–1665), founder and first governor of the Massachusetts Bay Colony
- Alonso Fajardo de Entenza of Spain (?-1624), governor-general of the Philippines, in office 1618–1624
- Francesco Erizzo of Venice (1566–1646), diplomat and future Doge of Venice
- Thomas van Erpe of the Netherlands (1584–1624), Orientalist Scholar
- Fakhr-al-Din II (1572–1635), Lebanese prince and governor of the Ottoman province of Syria, in office (as governor) 1624–1632
- Francis Fane, 1st Earl of Westmorland of England (1580–1629), nobleman and statesman
- John Felton of England (1595–1628), soldier and assassin of George Villiers, 1st Duke of Buckingham
- Nicholas Felton of England (1556–1626), academic and Anglican cleric
- Cardinal-Infante Ferdinand of Austria (1609–1641), nobleman, Spanish Prince (Infante), and Cardinal
- Ferdinand IV, Archduke of Austria (1608–1657), Habsburg Prince and future Holy Roman Emperor
- Domenico Fetti of Rome (1589–1623), painter
- Fidelis of Sigmaringen (1578–1622), Capuchin friar and Martyr
- William Fiennes, 1st Viscount Saye and Sele of England (1582–1662), nobleman and statesman
- Filaret (AKA Feodor Romanov) of Russia (1553–1633), Patriarch of Moscow and statesman, held position (as Patriarch) 1612–1629
- John Fletcher of England (1579–1625), playwright
- John Ford of England (1586-1640?), playwright and poet
- Frederick of Denmark (1609–1670), Danish Prince and future King of Denmark and Norway
- Frederick V of the Palatinate/I of Bohemia (1596–1632), Prince-Elector of the Palatinate and King of Bohemia (a sub-state of the Holy Roman Empire), r. 1610–1623 (as Prince-Elector of the Palatinate) and r. 1619–1620 (as King of Bohemia)
- Frederick Ulrich (1591–1634), Duke of Brunswick-Calenberg, held position 1613–1634
- Galileo Galilei of Tuscany (1564–1642), astronomer and physicist
- Gang Hong-rip of Korea, treasonous general who aided the Manchus
- Gaston, Duke of Orléans of France (1608–1660), French Prince (brother of Louis XIII) and commander of the aristocratic revolt at Les Ponts-de-Cé
- Artemisia Gentileschi of Rome (1593–1656), painter
- George William (1595–1640), Elector of Brandenburg and Duke of Prussia
- Johann Gerhard (1582–1637), German Lutheran theologian
- Hessel Gerritsz of the Netherlands (1581–1632), cartographer
- Orlando Gibbons of England (1583–1625), composer and organist
- Thomas Goffe of England (1591–1629), playwright
- Luis de Góngora of Spain (1561–1627), poet, playwright, and writer
- Roque González (1576–1628), Spanish-American Jesuit missionary and martyr
- Sir Ferdinando Gorges of England (1565–1647), colonial entrepreneur in North America and founder of Maine
- Ivan Tarasievich Gramotin of Russia (?–1638), diplomat and head of the Posolsky Prikaz, held position 1619–1626
- Orazio Grassi (1583–1654), Italian mathematician, astronomer, and architect
- Richard Grenville of England (1600–1658), Anglo-Cornish soldier, Member of Parliament, and future Baronet and Royalist Commander
- Fulke Greville, 1st Baron Brooke of England (1554–1628), nobleman, statesman, and writer
- Hugo Grotius of the Netherlands (1583–1645), philosopher and writer
- Jan Gruter of the Netherlands (1560–1627), scholar
- Mario Guiducci of Tuscany (1585–1646), lawyer and associate of Galileo Galilei during the dispute with Orazio Grassi
- Jean Guiton of France (1585–1654), Huguenot rebel and Admiral
- Edmund Gunter of England (1581–1626), mathematician
- John Guy (?-1629), former governor of Newfoundland and current Member of the Parliament of England
- Gaspar de Guzmán, Count-Duke of Olivares of Spain (1587–1645), nobleman and Chief Minister under Philip III and Philip IV, held position 1618–1643
- John Hampden of England (1595–1643), Member of Parliament and future Parliamentarian commander during the English Civil War
- Kryštof Harant of Bohemia (1564–1621), nobleman, traveller, humanist, soldier, writer and composer
- William Harvey of England (1578–1657), physician who discovered the systematic circulation of blood
- Hasekura Tsunenaga of Japan (1571–1622), diplomat
- Richard Hawkins of England (1562–1622), explorer and privateer
- George Hay, 1st Earl of Kinnoull of Scotland (1572–1634), nobleman, judge and Lord Chancellor of Scotland, held position (as chancellor) 1622–1634
- James Hay, 1st Earl of Carlisle of Scotland (c.1590–1636), nobleman and diplomat
- Piet Pieterszoon Hein of the Netherlands (1577–1629), Vice-Admiral of the Dutch West India Company
- Henrietta Maria of France (1609–1669), French princess and Queen Consort of England-Wales and Scotland
- Edward Herbert, 1st Baron Herbert of Cherbury of Wales (1583–1648), diplomat, poet, and philosopher
- George Herbert of Wales (1593–1633), poet, orator and Anglican priest
- Philip Herbert of England (1584–1649), nobleman (future Earl of Pembroke) and politician
- William Herbert, 3rd Earl of Pembroke of England (1580–1630), nobleman, Lord Lieutenant of Cornwall County and Chancellor of the University of Oxford, held position 1601-1630 (as Earl), 1604-1630 (as Lord Lietuent) and 1616-1630 (as Chancellor)
- Antonio de Herrera y Tordesillas of Spain (1559–1625), historian
- Thomas Heywood of England (1570?-1641), playwright, actor, and author
- Thomas Hobbes of England (1588–1679), philosopher
- Heinrich Holk (1599–1633) Danish-German mercenary and commander
- Henricus Hondius II of the Netherlands (1597–1651), cartographer and publisher
- Isaiah Horowitz (1565–1630), Rabbi and Jewish mystic
- Thomas Howard, 1st Earl of Berkshire of England (1587–1669), nobleman
- Constantijn Huygens of the Netherlands (1596–1687), poet, composer, and secretary under Stadtholders Frederick Henry and William II
- Im Gyeong Eop of Korea (1594–1646), general
- Sigismondo d'India (1582–1629), Italian composer
- Nicholas Iquan (AKA Zheng Zhilong) of China (1604–1661), pirate and Ming Dynasty admiral
- Menasseh Ben Israel of Portugal (1604–1657), rabbi, kabbalist, scholar, writer, diplomat, printer, and publisher
- William Jaggard of England (1568–1623), printer and publisher
- Jan Janszoon of the Netherlands (1570? – c.1641), Barbary Pirate
- Willem Janszoon of the Netherlands (1570–1630), explorer and colonial governor
- Juan Martínez de Jáuregui y Aguilar of Spain (1583–1641), poet, scholar, and painter
- Jörg Jenatsch of Switzerland (1596–1639), politician and military commander
- Jirgalang of Manchuria (1599–1655), nobleman, general, and statesman
- Johann Ernst I (1594–1626), Duke of Saxe-Weimar, r. 1605–1620
- Inigo Jones of England (1573–1652), architect
- Ben Jonson of England (1572–1637), playwright, poet, and Poet Laureate, held post in 1619–1637
- Johannes Junius of Bamberg (1573–1628), Mayor of Bamberg and Bamberg witch trial suspect and victim
- Madam Ke of China (?–1627), adviser to the Tianqi Emperor
- Johannes Kepler (1571–1630), German mathematician and astronomer
- Hendrick de Keyser of the Netherlands (1565–1621), sculptor and architect
- Thomas de Keyser of the Netherlands (1596–1667), painter and architect
- Khosro Mirza of Kartli (1565–1658), Georgian Prince, general in the Persian army, and future King of Kartli
- Robert Killigrew of England (1580–1633), Member of Parliament and English Ambassador to the Netherlands
- Athanasius Kircher (1601?–1680), German Catholic theologian and scholar
- David Kirke of England (1597–1654), adventurer and English colonizer of Canada
- Stanisław Koniecpolski of Poland (1594?-1646), nobleman and military commander
- Thomas Lake of England (1567–1630), Member of Parliament and former Secretary of State
- Giovanni Lanfranco of Parma (1582–1647), painter
- William Laud of England (1573–1645), Anglican theologian and future Archbishop of Canterbury
- François Leclerc du Tremblay of France (1577–1638), friar and agent and adviser of Cardinal Richelieu.
- Marc Lescarbot of France (1570–1641), author and lawyer
- Alexander Leslie, 1st Earl of Leven of Scotland (1582–1661), nobleman and general in the service of Sweden
- Christopher Levett of England (1586–1630), explorer and naval captain
- Johann Liss (1590?-1629), German painter
- Jerónimo Lobo of Portugal (1593–1678), Jesuit missionary
- Lobsang Gyatso of Tibet (1617–1682), Dalai Lama and future ruler of Tibet, r. 1618–1682 (as Dalai Lama), 1642–1682 (as ruler of Tibet)
- Adam Loftus, 1st Viscount Loftus of Ireland (1568–1643), Lord Chancellor of Ireland, in office 1619–1639
- Christen Sørensen Longomontanus of Denmark (1562–1647), astronomer
- Hendrick Lucifer (1583–1627), Dutch Buccaneer
- Charles de Luynes of France (1578–1621), Constable of France and first Duke of Luynes
- Randal MacDonnell, 1st Earl of Antrim of Ireland (?-1636), nobleman and Scots-Irish politician
- Sir Henry Mainwaring of England (1587?–1653), pirate and English naval officer
- François de Malherbe of France (1555–1628), poet and literary critic
- Man Gui of China (?–1629), general and main commander of the Chinese army following the death of Yuan Chonghuan
- George Manners, 7th Earl of Rutland of England (1580–1641), Member of Parliament and nobleman
- Ernst von Mansfeld (1580–1626), German soldier
- Mao Wenlong of China (1579–1629), military commander
- Juan de Mariana of Spain (1536–1624), Catholic priest, historian, and Monarchomach political theorist
- Maria Anna of Spain (1606–1646), Infanta and future Empress consort of the Holy Roman Empire
- Marie de' Medici (1575–1642), Queen dowager of France and former regent with her son Louis XIII
- Michel de Marillac of France (1563–1632), Minister of Justice under Louis XIII
- Giambattista Marino of Naples (1569–1625), poet
- Gervase Markham of England (1568–1637), poet and writer
- Tristano Martinelli of Mantua (1555–1630), actor
- Enrico Martínez of Spain (?–1632), hydraulic engineer
- John Mason of England (1586–1635), sailor, explorer, cartographer, colonizer, and founder of New Hampshire
- Isaac Massa of the Netherlands (1586–1643), merchant, traveller, and diplomat
- Massasoit (1580?–1661), Chief of the Wampanoag
- Philip Massinger of England (1583–1640), playwright
- Tobie Matthew of England (1577–1655), Member of Parliament
- Maximilian I of Bavaria (1573–1651), Prince-Elector of Bavaria
- Cornelis Jacobszoon May of the Netherlands, explorer and first Director-general of New Netherland
- Cardinal Mazarin of Sicily (1602–1661), Cardinal, diplomat, and future Prime Minister of France
- Domenico Mazzocchi (1592–1665), Italian composer
- Afonso Mendes, Prelate of Ethiopia and Catholic Patriarch of Ethiopia, held position (as Catholic Patriarch) 1622–1632
- Diego Carrillo de Mendoza, 1st Marquis of Gelves of Spain (1570?-1631), nobleman and Viceroy of New Spain, in office 1621–1624
- Adriaan Metius of the Netherlands (1571–1635), mathematician and astronomer
- Thomas Middleton of England (1580–1627), playwright and poet
- Daniël Mijtens of the Netherlands (1590–1648), painter
- Peter Minuit of the Netherlands (1589–1638), Director-General of New Netherland, in office 1626–1632
- Francis Mitchell of England, Knight and Extortionist
- Miyamoto Musashi of Japan (1584?–1645), prominent samurai
- Francesco Molin of Venice (1575–1655), Naval commander and future Doge of Venice
- Giles Mompesson of England (1584–1663), corrupt politician
- Edward Montagu, 2nd Earl of Manchester of England (1602–1671), Royalist Member of parliament and future Royalist commander during the English Civil War
- Richard Montagu of England (1577–1641), controversial Cleric and prelate
- Antoine de Montchrestien of France (1575–1621), soldier, dramatist, poet, and economist
- Claudio Monteverdi (1567–1643), Italian composer
- Mumtaz Mahal of India (1593–1631), Empress Consort of India (Wife of Shah Jahan)
- Jens Munk of Norway (1579–1628), navigator, explorer, and naval captain
- Bartolomé Esteban Murillo of Spain (1617–1682), painter
- Hugh Myddelton of Wales (1560–1631), entrepreneur, engineer, Baronet, and Member of Parliament
- Thomas Myddelton the Younger of Wales (1586–1666), Member of Parliament and future Parliamentary officer during the English Civil War
- Nemattanew (?–1622), Powhatan military commander and architect of the Jamestown Massacre
- Nguyễn Phúc Nguyên of Vietnam (1563–1635), Nguyễn Lord (subnational ruler of southern Vietnam), held position 1613–1635
- Nheçu, Chief of the Guaraní
- Nur Jahan of Persia (1577–1645), Empress Consort of India (Wife of Jahangir and Stepmother of Shah Jahan)
- John Nutt of England, pirate
- Pieter Nuyts of the Netherlands (1598–1655), Governor of the Dutch colony on Formosa (modern-day Taiwan) and ambassador to Japan, held position (as governor) 1627–1629
- Oldman of the Misquito Coast (?-1687), first King of the Miskito Kingdom (a British Protectorate on the eastern coasts of modern-day Nicaragua and Honduras), r. 1625–1687
- Opchanacanough (1554?-1644), Chief of the Powhatan Confederacy, held position 1618–1644
- Martin Opitz of Silesia (1597–1639), poet
- William Oughtred of England (1575–1660), mathematician
- Owaneco (?–1626), Chief of the Mohegans
- John Owen of Wales (1564–1622), Epigrammatist
- Axel Oxenstierna of Sweden (1583–1654), Lord High Chancellor of Sweden
- Rodrigo Pacheco, 3rd Marquis of Cerralvo of Spain (1565?-1652), nobleman, Inquisitor, and Viceroy of New Spain, in office 1624–1635 (as Viceroy)
- Pedro Páez of Portugal (1564–1622), Jesuit missionary who converted Malak Sagad III
- Cardinal Pamphili of Rome (1574–1655), Cardinal, Nuncio, and future Pope
- Gottfried Heinrich Graf zu Pappenheim (1594–1632), German field marshal
- Hortensio Félix Paravicino of Spain (1580–1633), Court Preacher and poet
- Richard Parry of Wales (1560–1623), Bishop of St Asaph and translator of the Bible into Welsh Language
- Vincent de Paul of France (1581–1660), Catholic Priest
- Pecksuot (?–1624), Massachusett Chief
- Nicolas-Claude Fabri de Peiresc of France (1580–1637), astronomer and antiquarian
- Algernon Percy, 10th Earl of Northumberland of England (1602–1668), Member of Parliament and future soldier during the English Civil War
- George Percy of England (1580–1632?), explorer, author, soldier, and former governor of Virginia
- Richard Perkins of England (1585?-1650), actor
- Peter Philips of England (1560–1628), composer
- Michael Praetorius (1571–1621), German composer and organist
- Samuel Purchas of England (1575?–1626), travel writer
- John Pym of England (1584–1643), Member of Parliament and future Roundhead supporter during the English Civil War
- Francisco de Quevedo of Spain (1580–1645), nobleman, politician, and writer
- Albrycht Stanisław Radziwiłł of Lithuania (1595–1656), Grand Chancellor of Lithuania (part of the Polish-Lithuanian Commonwealth), in office 1623–1656
- Rembrandt of the Netherlands (1606–1669), painter and etcher
- Kiliaen van Rensselaer of the Netherlands (1596?–1642), merchant, member of the Dutch West India Company, and Patroon of the Manor of Rensselaerswyck
- Sir Thomas Roe of England (c.1581–1644), diplomat
- Henri de Rohan of France (1579–1638), nobleman, soldier, writer, and leader of the Huguenots.
- William Rowley of England (1585?-1626), playwright
- Peter Paul Rubens of Flanders (1577–1640), painter
- Johannes Rudbeckius of Sweden (1581–1646), Lutheran bishop
- Mulla Sadra of Persia (1571–1636), philosopher and Shiite Islamic theologian
- Samoset (1590?–1655), Mohegan Sagamore and first Native American to encounter with the Settlers of the Plymouth Colony.
- Sir Edwin Sandys (1561–1629), Colonial organiser of Virginia
- George Sandys (1577–1644), English traveller, colonist, and poet
- Lew Sapieha of Lithuania (1557–1633), Grand Chancellor of Lithuania (part of the Polish-Lithuanian Commonwealth), in office 1589–1623
- Johann Hermann Schein (1586–1630), German composer
- Christoph Scheiner (1573?-1650), German Jesuit priest, physicist and astronomer
- Wilhelm Schickard (1592–1635), German inventor and mathematician
- Julius Schiller of Bavaria (1580–1627), astronomer
- Heinrich Schütz of Köstritz (1585–1672), composer and organist
- Adam von Schwarzenberg (1583–1641), nobleman and Chancellor of Brandenburg-Prussia
- Alexander Seaton of Scotland (?–1649?), Mercenary in the Service of Denmark
- Pierre Séguier of France (1588–1672), president and mortier in the parlement of Paris and future chancellor of France
- Alvaro Semedo of Portugal (1585?-1658), Jesuit missionary in China
- Juan Pérez de la Serna (1573–1631), Archbishop of Mexico, held position 1613–1627
- Alexander Seton, 1st Earl of Dunfermline of Scotland (1555–1622), lawyer, judge, and Lord Chancellor of Scotland
- Shahaji of Bijapur (1594–1664), Bijapurtan army chieftain
- Shahryar of India (1605–1638), Mughal Prince and Nur Jahan's (his stepmother) candidate to the throne of India
- Shimazu Tadatsune (1576–1638), Daimyō of Satsuma
- Robert Shirley of England (1581–1628), traveller, adventurer, and diplomat
- García de Silva Figueroa of Spain (1550–1624), Spanish ambassador to Persia
- John Smith (1580?–1631), English soldier, adventurer, and leader of the colonists of Jamestown in the Virginia Colony.
- Willebrord Snellius of the Netherlands (1580–1626), astronomer and mathematician
- Jakub Sobieski of Poland (1590–1646), nobleman, parliamentarian, and military leader
- Luis Sotelo of Spain (1574–1624), Franciscan friar and martyr
- Henri de Sourdis of France (1593–1645), Archbishop of Bordeaux and military commander
- John Speed of England (1552–1627), historian and cartographer
- Ambrogio Spinola of Genoa (1569–1630), general in the service of Spain
- John Spottiswoode of Scotland (1565–1639), Archbishop of St. Andrews, historian, and future Lord Chancellor of Scotland
- Squanto (1585?–1622), assist to and interpreter for the Pilgrims of the Plymouth colony who helped them stamp out the treaty between them and the Wampanoag.
- Myles Standish (1584–1656), English military advisor at the Plymouth Colony
- James Stanley, 7th Earl of Derby of England (1607–1651), nobleman and future Royalist commander during the English Civil War
- Oliver St John, 5th Baron St John of Bletso (1603–1642), English politician and future Parliamentarian Army officer
- Nicholas Stone of England (1587–1647), sculptor and architect
- Sir John Suckling of England (1569–1627), Member of Parliament
- Sun Chengzong of China, Grand Secretary and Commander-in-chief of Chinese Forces
- Joachim Swartenhondt of the Netherlands (c.1566–1627), admiral
- Tamblot of the Philippines (fl. 1621–1622), indigenous Boholano babaylan (priest) and inciter of a religiously motivated uprising in Bohol
- Alessandro Tassoni of Modena (1565–1635), poet and writer
- Hendrick ter Brugghen of the Netherlands (1588–1629), painter
- François Thijssen of the Netherlands (?–1638), explorer
- Thomas Tomkins of Wales (1572–1656), Cornish-Welsh composer
- Henri de la Tour d'Auvergne, Vicomte de Turenne of France (1611–1675), soldier and future Marshal of France
- Sir John Trevor Jr. of Wales (1596–1673), Puritan Member of Parliament and future member of the Council of State during the Commonwealth of England
- Sir Richard Trevor of Wales (1558–1638), landowner, soldier and politician.
- Sir Sackville Trevor of Wales (1565–1633), Sea Captain and Member of Parliament
- Thomas Trevor of England (1586–1656), Anglo-Welsh lawyer, Member of Parliament, and judge
- Nicolas Trigault of France (1577–1628), Jesuit missionary in China
- Trịnh Tùng of Vietnam (1549–1623), Trinh Lord (subnational ruler of Northern Vietnam), held position 1570–1623
- Trịnh Tráng of Vietnam (1571–1654), Trinh Lord (subnational ruler of Northern Vietnam), held position 1623–1654
- Johann Tserclaes, Count of Tilly (1559–1632), German nobleman and co-Supreme commander of the forces of the Holy Roman Empire
- Uncas (c.1588–1683), Chief of the Mohegans, held position 1626–1683
- Honoré d'Urfé of France (1568–1625), writer
- James Ussher of Ireland (1581–1656), Anglican theologian, Archbishop of Armagh, and Primate of All Ireland
- Bernard de Nogaret de La Valette d'Épernon of France (1592–1661), nobleman and military commander
- Jean Louis de Nogaret de La Valette of France (1554–1642), nobleman
- Pietro Della Valle of Rome (1586–1652), traveller
- Anthony van Dyck of Flanders (1599–1641), painter
- Władysław Vasa of Poland (1595–1648), Polish Prince, self-proclaimed Grand Duke of Moscow, and future King of the Polish-Lithuanian Commonwealth
- Sir Henry Vaughan the Elder of Derwydd, Wales (1587?–1659?), Royalist Member of Parliament
- William Vaughan of Wales (1575–1641), colonial investor and writer
- Salomo de Veenboer of the Netherlands (?–1620), Barbary pirate
- Lope de Vega of Spain (1562–1635), playwright and poet
- Diego Velázquez of Spain (1599–1660), painter
- Horace Vere, 1st Baron Vere of Tilbury of England (1565–1635), military leader
- Cornelius Vermuyden of the Netherlands (1590–1677), engineer
- George Villiers, 1st Duke of Buckingham of England (1592–1628), nobleman, statesman, and military commander
- Mutio Vitelleschi of Rome (1563–1645), Superior General of the Society of Jesus, held post 1615–1645
- Joost van den Vondel of the Netherlands (1587–1679), writer and playwright
- Luke Wadding of Ireland (1588–1657), Franciscan friar, historian, and founder of the Pontifical Irish College
- Albrecht von Wallenstein of Bohemia (1583–1634), co-Supreme commander of the forces of the Holy Roman Empire
- Edmund Waller of England (1606–1687), Member of Parliament and poet
- Sir James Ware of Ireland (1594–1666), historian and politician
- John Webster of England (1580–1634), playwright
- Wei Zhongxian of China (1568–1627), Eunuch
- Thomas Wentworth Sr., 1st Earl of Strafford of England (1593–1641), statesman (specifically Member of Parliament and future Lord deputy and lieutenant of Ireland)
- John White of England (1575–1648), Anglican priest and colonial organizer of the Massachusetts Bay Colony (not to be confused with John White the governor of the Roanoke Colony)
- Wilhelm (1598–1662), Duke of Saxe-Weimar, r. 1620–1662
- John Williams of England (1582–1650), Lord Chancellor and future Archbishop of York
- John Winthrop (1588–1649), Founder and future Governor of the Massachusetts Bay Colony (governor-elect in 1629)
- Sir Henry Wotton of England (1568–1639), author and diplomat
- Henry Wriothesley, 3rd Earl of Southampton of England (1573–1624), nobleman, patron of the theater, and colonial investor
- Sir Richard Wynn of Wales (1588–1649), Baronet, courtier, and Member of Parliament
- Xu Guangqi of China (1562–1633), Ming Dynasty bureaucrat, agricultural scientist, astronomer, and mathematician
- Yamada Nagamasa of Japan (1590–1630), adventurer, pirate, and military commander
- George Yeardley (1587–1627), Plantation owner and Governor of the Virginia Colony, held office in 1616–1617, 1619–1621, 1626–1627
- Sir Henry Yelverton of England (1566–1629), Attorney General for England and Wales, in office 1617–1621
- Yi Gwal of Korea (1587–1624), general
- Yuan Chonghuan of China (1584–1630), military commander
- Jakub Zadzik of Poland (1582–1642), Grand Chancellor of Poland
- Krzysztof Zbaraski of Poland (1580–1627), nobleman and Polish-Lithuanian ambassador to the Ottoman Empire
- Stanisław Żółkiewski of Poland (1547–1620), nobleman, military commander, and Grand Chancellor of Poland
- Zu Dashou of China (?–1656), general

== In fiction ==
- The voyage of the Pilgrims, their first years of inhabitance in the New World, and the first Thanksgiving are often the subject of Thanksgiving themed specials and short films. One of the most notable examples is the episode "The Mayflower voyagers" of the 1988 mini-series This Is America, Charlie Brown, which ABC has often aired on Thanksgiving Day (except in 2006 and 2007) along with A Charlie Brown Thanksgiving. However, Thanksgiving would not become established as a national holiday until 1863 when President Abraham Lincoln proclaimed that it would be celebrated on the final Thursday in November. However, it did not become a federal holiday until 1941 by an act of legislation by the U.S. Congress.
- The voyage and struggles of the Pilgrims have also been the subject of some pieces of literature including Of Plymouth Plantation by William Bradford, who himself was an important figure of the 1620s, and Felicia Hemans' classic poem, "The Landing of the Pilgrim Fathers."
- The classic novel The Three Musketeers by Alexandre Dumas, père takes place in 1628. The story includes fictionalized versions of actual historical events of this year, such as the siege of La Rochelle and the assassination of the Duke of Buckingham.
- The Angel's Command, a children's adventure novel by British writer Brian Jacques, is set in the year 1628.
- The 1632 series, though set during the succeeding decade, features many characters, such as Louis XIII and Prime Minister Cardinal Richelieu of France, King Gustavus Adolphus of Sweden, and Holy Roman Emperor Ferdinand II, who were active during the 1620s and uses events from the 1620s and early 1630s as a backdrop, most notably the Thirty Years' War.
- The Doctor Who audio drama The Church and the Crown takes place during the year 1626.

== Births ==
1620

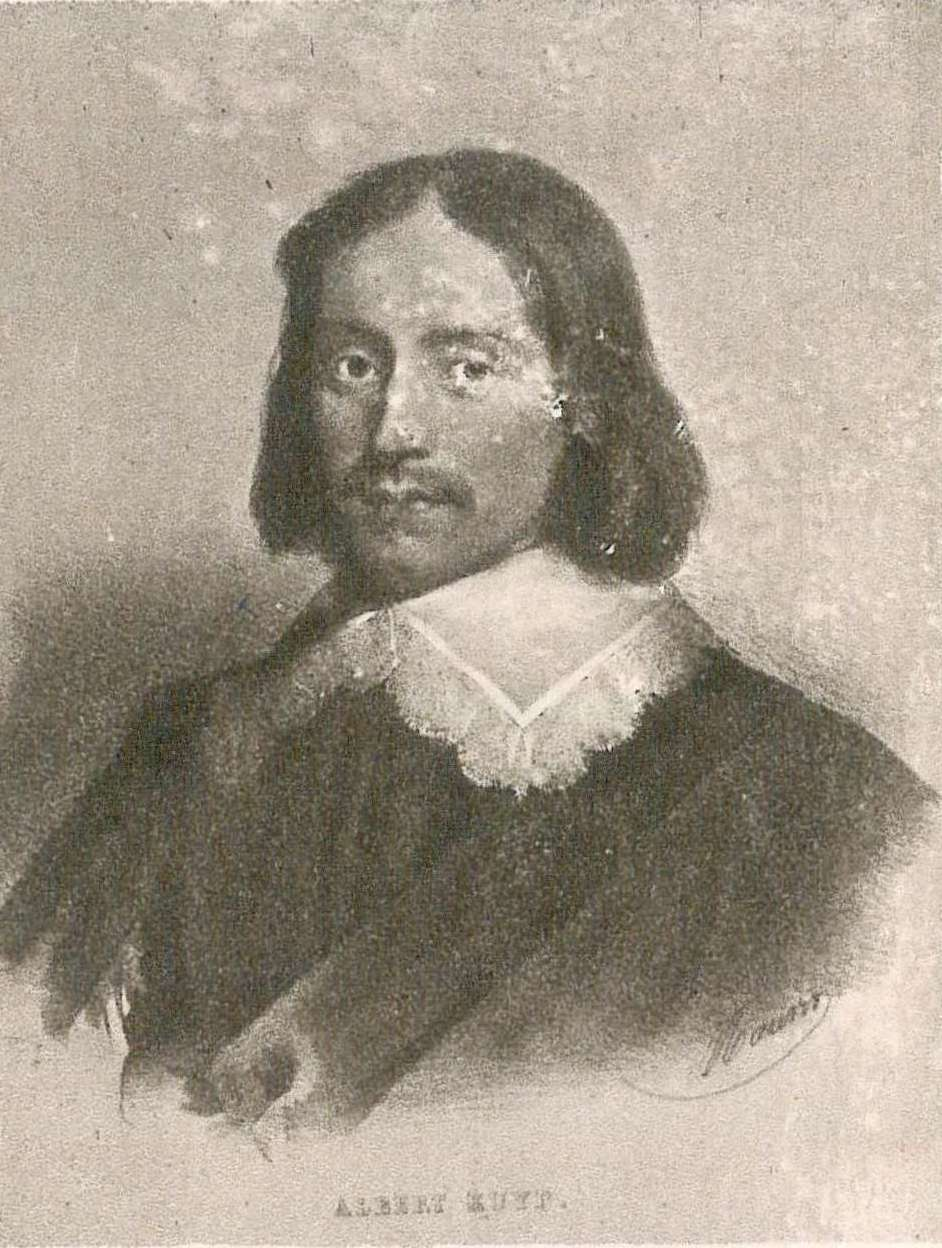
Aelbert Cuyp

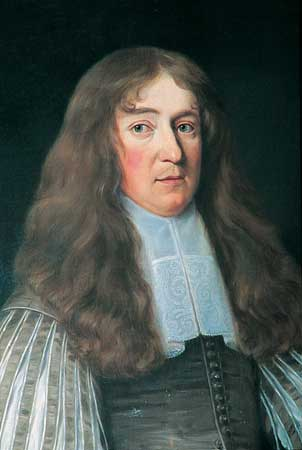
Winston Churchill

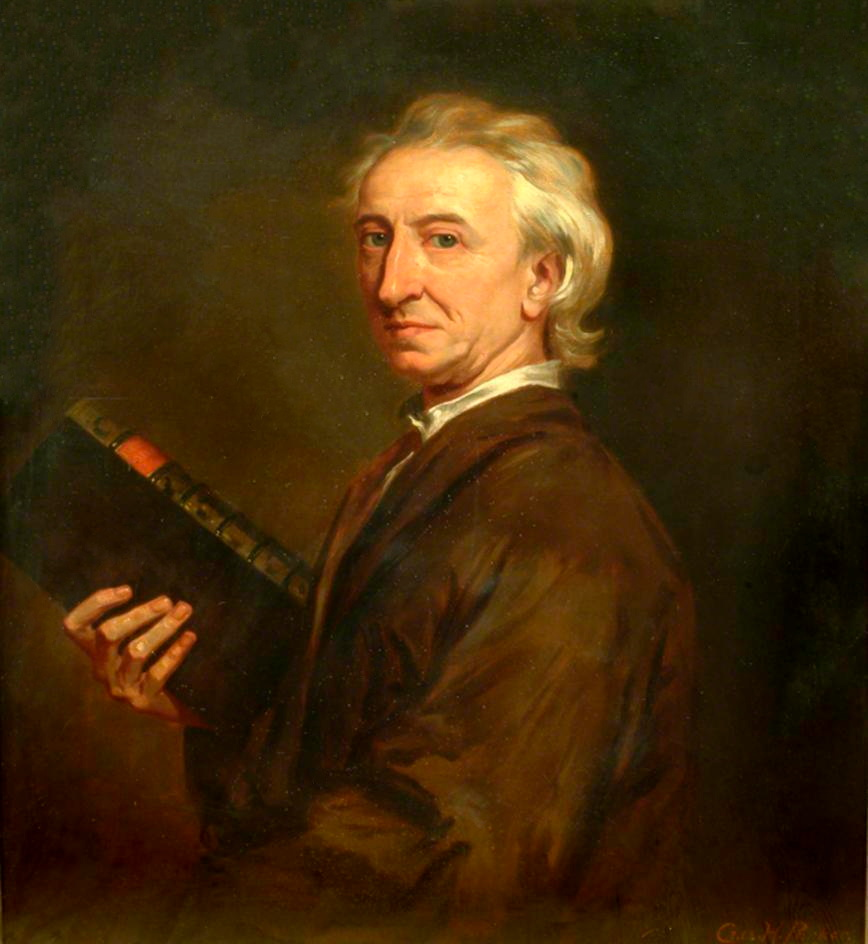
John Evelyn

=== January–March ===
- January 1
  - William Brouncker, 2nd Viscount Brouncker of England (d. 1684)
  - Robert Morison, Scottish botanist and taxonomist (d. 1683)
- January 5 – Miklós Zrínyi, Croatian military commander (d. 1664)
- January 9 – Anton Günther I, Count of Schwarzburg-Sondershausen (d. 1666)
- January 17 – Anton Janson, Dutch type founder and printer (d. 1687)
- January 31 – Prince Georg Friedrich of Waldeck, Dutch general and German field marshal (d. 1692)
- February 1 – Gustaf Bonde, Swedish politician (d. 1667)
- February 3 – Sir James Clavering, 1st Baronet, English landowner (d. 1702)
- February 5 – Paul Barbette, Dutch physician (d. 1666)
- February 13 – Girolamo Casanata, Italian cardinal (d. 1700)
- February 15 – François Charpentier, French archaeologist and man of letters (d. 1702)
- February 16 – Frederick William, Elector of Brandenburg (d. 1688)
- February 23 – Francis Newport, 1st Earl of Bradford, English politician (d. 1708)
- March 10 – Johann Heinrich Hottinger, Swiss philologist and theologian (d. 1667)
- March 13 – Alexander Seton, 1st Viscount of Kingston (d. 1691)
- March 29 – Edward Digges, English barrister and colonist, Colonial Governor of Virginia (d. 1674)

=== April–June ===
- April 4 – Bernardino León de la Rocha, Roman Catholic prelate, Bishop of Coria and of Tui (1669–1673) (d. 1675)
- April 15 – Edward Villiers, English politician and military officer (d. 1689)
- April 17 – Marguerite Bourgeoys, French Catholic nun, founder of the Congregation of Notre Dame (d. 1700)
- April 18 – Winston Churchill (Cavalier), English noble, soldier (d. 1688)
- April 21 – Salvatore Castiglione, Italian painter (d. 1676)
- April 24 – John Graunt, English demographer (d. 1674)
- May 3 – Bogusław Radziwiłł, Polish-Lithuanian noble (d. 1669)
- May 21 – Krsto Zmajević, Montenegrin-born Venetian merchant (d. 1688)
- May 23 – Pieter Neefs the Younger, Flemish painter (d. 1675)
- May 25 – Warwick Mohun, 2nd Baron Mohun of Okehampton, English Member of Parliament (d. 1665)
- June 6 – Sir John Covert, 1st Baronet, English politician (d. 1679)
- June 11 – John Moore (Lord Mayor), Member of Parliament for the City of London (d. 1702)

=== July–September ===
- July 20
  - Nikolaes Heinsius the Elder, Dutch scholar (d. 1681)
  - Camillo Massimo, Italian cardinal, patron of the arts (d. 1677)
- July 21 – Jean Picard, French astronomer and priest (d. 1682)
- July 31 – Juan Ignacio de la Carrera Yturgoyen, Chilean politician (d. 1682)
- August 6 – William Hiseland, English (later British) soldier, reputed supercentenarian (d. 1732)
- August 19 – Johann Just Winckelmann, German writer and historian (d. 1699)
- August 22 – Alexander Rigby (died 1694), English politician (d. 1694)
- August 24 – Thomas Stucley (MP), English politician (d. 1663)
- August 26 – Ernst Bogislaw von Croÿ, German Lutheran administrator (d. 1684)
- September 4 – Ernest Gottlieb, Prince of Anhalt-Plötzkau (d. 1654)
- September 6 – Isabella Leonarda, Italian composer (d. 1704)
- September 18 – Albert II, Margrave of Brandenburg-Ansbach, German prince (d. 1667)
- September 25 – François Bernier, French physician and traveller (d. 1688)
- September 29 – John Louis of Elderen, Bishop of Liege (d. 1694)

=== October–December ===
- October 1 – Nicolaes Pieterszoon Berchem, Dutch Golden Age painter of pastoral landscapes (d. 1683)
- October 4 – François-Henri Salomon de Virelade, French lawyer (d. 1670)
- October 15 – William Borlase (died 1665), English politician (d. 1665)
- October 16 – Pierre Paul Puget, French painter (d. 1694)
- October 20 – Aelbert Cuyp, Dutch painter (d. 1691)
- October 27 – Philip Louis, Duke of Schleswig-Holstein-Sonderburg-Wiesenburg (d. 1689)
- October 31 – John Evelyn, English diarist and writer (d. 1706)
- November 10
  - Ninon de l'Enclos, French author (d. 1705)
  - Theodoor Boeyermans, Flemish Baroque painter (d. 1678)
- c. November 20 – Peregrine White, first child born to English settlers at Plymouth Colony (d. 1704)
- December 17
  - Henri Charles de La Trémoille, son of Henry de La Trémoille (d. 1672)
  - Maurice of the Palatinate, 4th son of Elector Frederick V of the Palatinate (d. 1652)
- December 18 – Heinrich Roth, German Jesuit missionary, pioneering Sanskrit scholar (d. 1668)
- December 23 – Johann Jakob Wepfer, Swiss pathologist (d. 1695)
- probable – Ecaterina Cercheza, princess consort of Moldavia (d. 1666)

1621

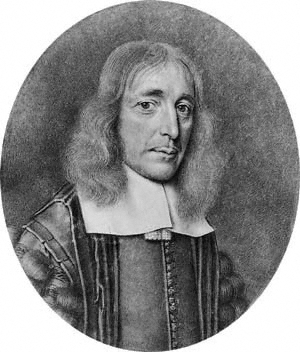
Thomas Willis

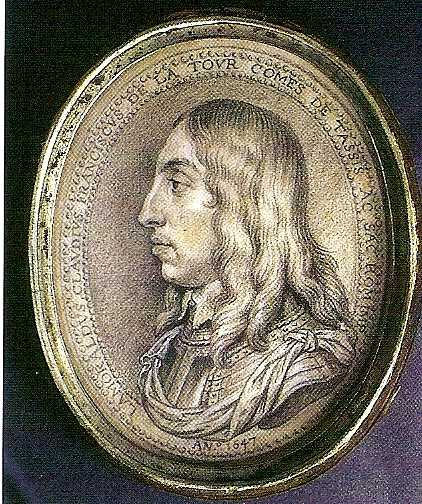
Lamoral II Claudius Franz, Count of Thurn and Taxis

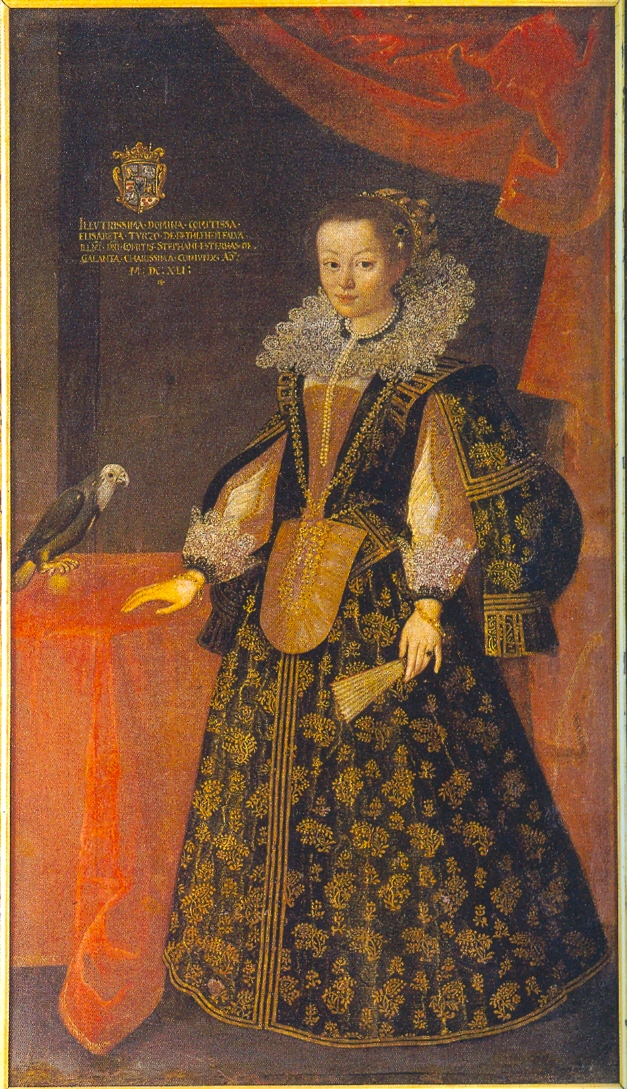
Erzsébet Thurzó

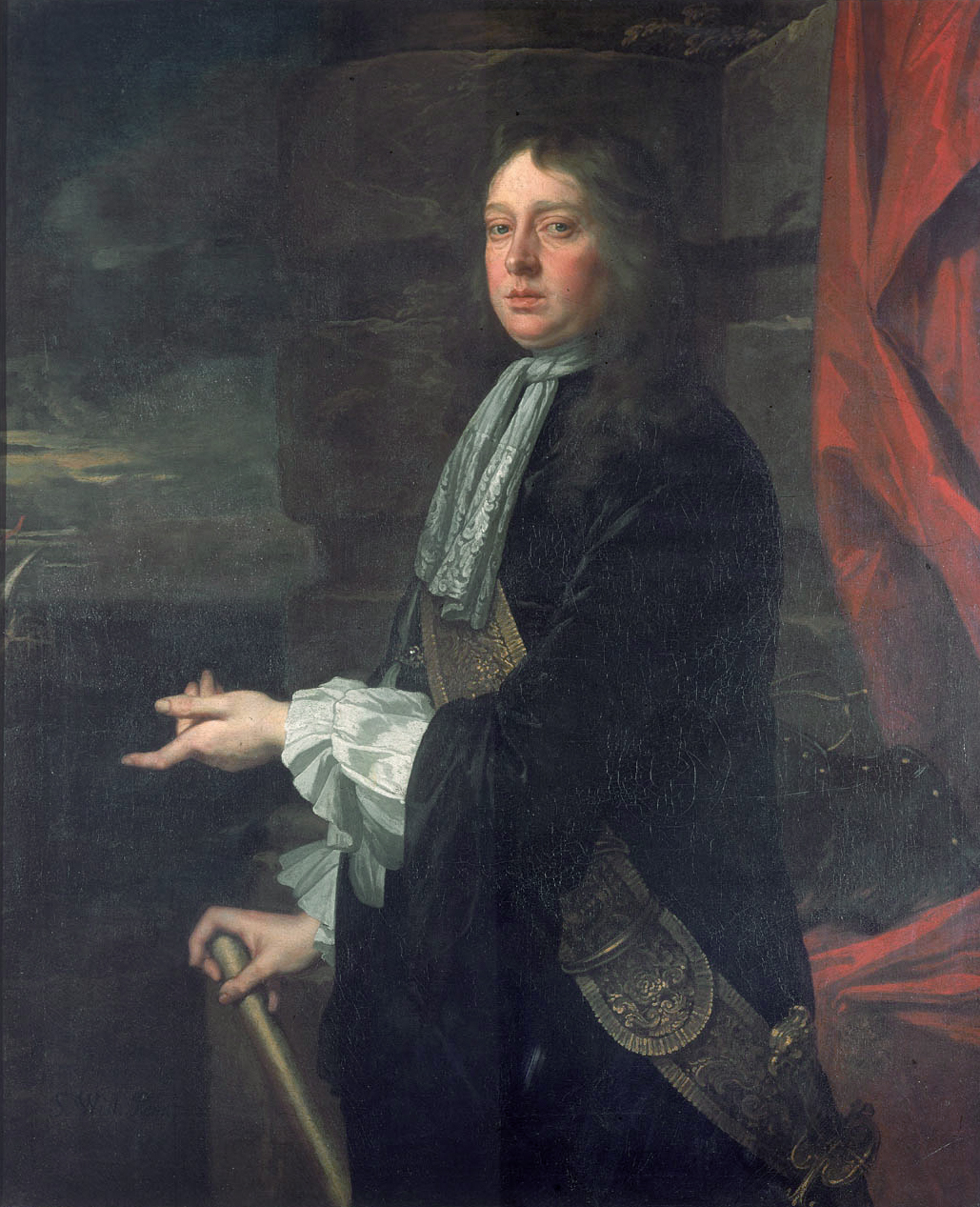
William Penn

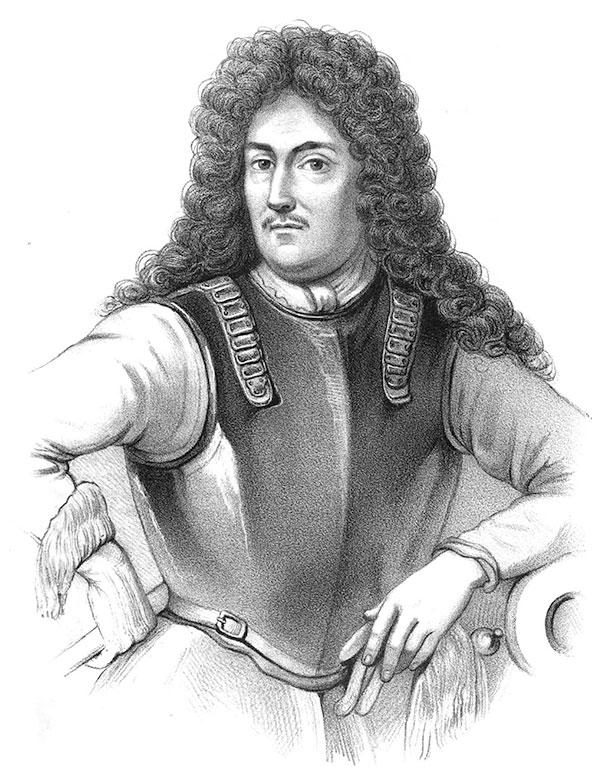
Rutger von Ascheberg born 2 June

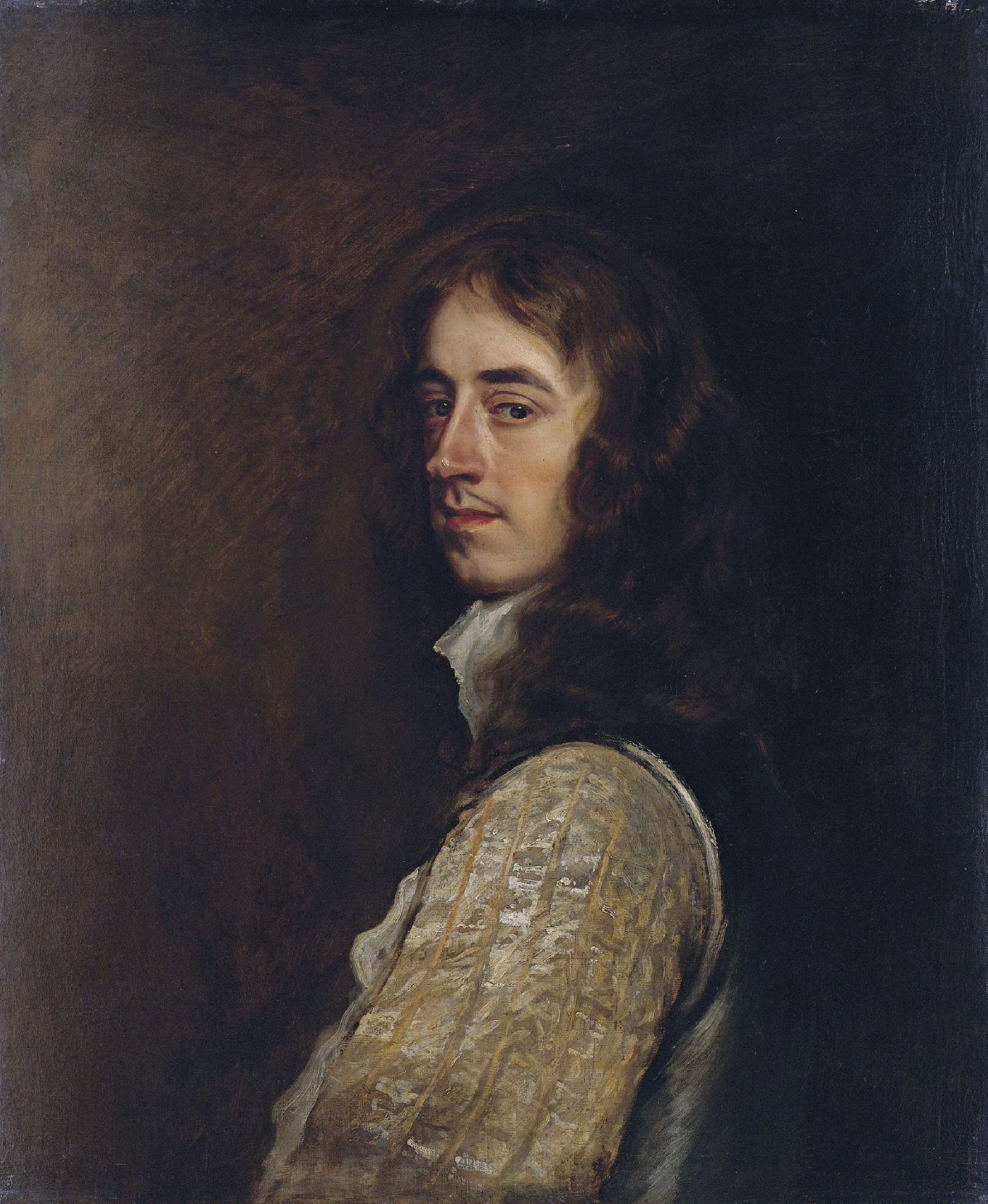
Edward Proger

=== January–March ===
- January 16 – Magnus Celsius, Swedish astronomer and mathematician (d. 1679)
- January 27 – Thomas Willis, English doctor who played an important part in the history of anatomy (d. 1675)
- January 30 – George II Rákóczi, Hungarian nobleman (d. 1660)
- February 2 – Johannes Schefferus, Alsatian-born humanist (d. 1679)
- February 4 – Frederick, Burgrave of Dohna, Dutch officer, and governor of Orange (d. 1688)
- February 14 – Sibylla Schwarz, German poet (d. 1638)
- February 20 – Erzsébet Thurzó, Hungarian noblewoman (d. 1642)
- February 21 – Rebecca Nurse, Massachusetts colonist, executed as a witch (d. 1692)
- February – Lamoral II Claudius Franz, Count of Thurn and Taxis, Postmaster General of the Holy Roman Empire (1646–1676) (d. 1676)
- March 1 – John Alleyn, Cornish barrister (d. 1663)
- March 2 – Louis Günther II, Count of Schwarzburg-Ebeleben (1642–1681) (d. 1681)
- March 9 – Egbert van der Poel, Dutch painter (d. 1664)
- March 16 – Georg Neumark, German poet and composer of hymns (d. 1681)
- March 24 – John VI, Prince of Anhalt-Zerbst (1621–1667) (d. 1667)
- March 26 (bapt.) – Jacob van der Ulft, Dutch painter (d. 1689)
- March 27 – Margrave Charles Magnus of Baden-Durlach (d. 1658)
- March 28 – Heinrich Schwemmer, German music teacher and composer (d. 1696)
- March 31 – Andrew Marvell, English metaphysical poet and politician (d. 1678)

=== April–June ===
- April 1 – Guru Tegh Bahadur, 9th Sikh Guru (d. 1675)
- April 7 – Crato, Count of Nassau-Saarbrücken (1640–1642) (d. 1642)
- April 17
  - Henry Vaughan, Welsh author (d. 1695)
  - Thomas Vaughan, Welsh philosopher (d. 1666)
- April 23
  - Georg Arnold, Austrian musician (d. 1676)
  - William Penn, English admiral and politician (d. 1670)
- April 25 – Roger Boyle, 1st Earl of Orrery, Anglo-Irish soldier, statesman and dramatist (d. 1679)
- May 25 – David Beck, Dutch portrait painter (d. 1656)
- June 2
  - Rutger von Ascheberg, Courland-born soldier in Swedish service (d. 1693)
  - Jørgen Bjelke, Norwegian officer and nobleman (d. 1696)
  - Isaac van Ostade, Dutch painter (d. 1649)
- June 6 – Petar Zrinski, Croatian viceroy (executed 1671)
- June 16 – Edward Proger, Member of Parliament for Brecknockshire (d. 1713)
- June 29 – Willem van der Zaan, Dutch admiral (d. 1669)

=== July–September ===
- July 1 – Cornelis de Man, Dutch painter (d. 1706)
- July 8
  - Jean de La Fontaine, French writer (d. 1695)
  - Leonora Christina Ulfeldt, Danish countess and author (d. 1698)
- July 13
  - Last baby beaver born on Exmoor until July 13, 2021
- July 22
  - Anthony Ashley Cooper, 1st Earl of Shaftesbury, English politician (d. 1683)
  - Thomas Hanford, New England settler, Puritan minister (d. 1693)
  - Kinoshita Jun'an, Japanese philosopher and Confucian scholar (d. 1699)
- July 24 – Jan Andrzej Morsztyn, Polish poet (d. 1693)
- August 12 – Albert d'Orville, Jesuit priest and missionary, cartographer (d. 1662)
- August 13
  - Sir John Pakington, 2nd Baronet, English politician (d. 1680)
  - Israel Silvestre, French topographical etcher (d. 1691)
- August 19 – Gerbrand van den Eeckhout, Dutch painter (d. 1674)
- August 22 – Adriaen van Gaesbeeck, Dutch painter of genre subjects and portraits (d. 1650)
- August 28 – Sir Richard Howe, 2nd Baronet, English Member of Parliament (d. 1703)
- September 8 – Louis, Grand Condé, French general (d. 1686)
- September 9 – Henry X, Count of Reuss-Lobenstein, Rector of the University of Leipzig (d. 1671)

=== October–December ===
- October 3
  - Claude Maltret, French Jesuit (d. 1674)
  - Friedrich Werner, German musician (d. 1660)
- October 8 – Maximilian Henry of Bavaria, Roman Catholic bishop (d. 1688)
- October 18 – Michael Angelo Immenraet, Flemish painter (d. 1683)
- October 20 – Şehzade Ömer, Ottoman prince (d. 1622)
- October 21
  - Nicholas Barré, French Minim friar, priest and founder (d. 1686)
  - Richard Standish, English politician (d. 1662)
- October 23 – Lord John Stewart, Scottish aristocrat, Royalist commander in the English Civil War (d. 1644)
- October 24 – Serafina of God, founder of seven Carmelite monasteries of nuns in southern Italy (d. 1699)
- October 29 – The London Pageant of 1621 celebrates the inauguration of Edward Barkham (Lord Mayor).
- November 11 – Israel Tonge, English churchman and anti-Catholic conspirator (d. 1680)
- November 15
  - Cornelis Geelvinck, Dutch mayor (d. 1689)
  - Henry Mordaunt, 2nd Earl of Peterborough, English diplomat (d. 1697)
- December 3 – Bohuslav Balbín, Czech writer and Jesuit (d. 1688)
- December 10 – Christian Albert, Burgrave and Count of Dohna, German nobleman and general in the army of Brandenburg (d. 1677)
- December 12 – Gerard Pietersz Hulft, Dutch general (d. 1656)
- December 23
  - Heneage Finch, 1st Earl of Nottingham, English politician (d. 1682)
  - Edmund Berry Godfrey, English magistrate whose mysterious death caused anti-Catholic uproar in England (d. 1678)

=== Approximate date ===
- Richard Allestree, English churchman and provost of Eton College (d. 1681)

1622

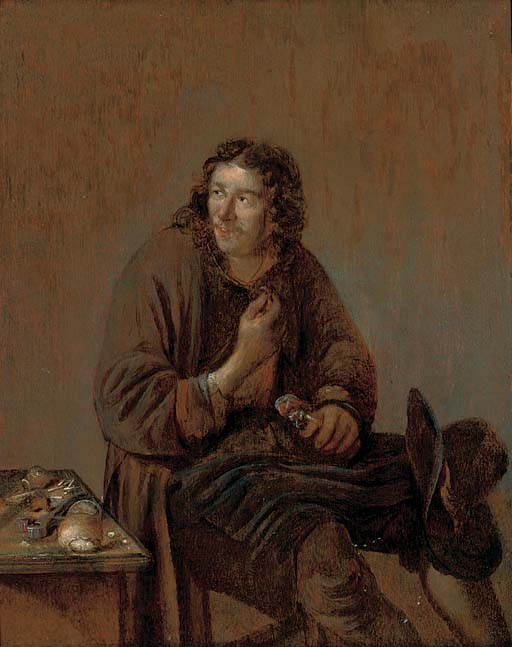
Abraham Diepraam

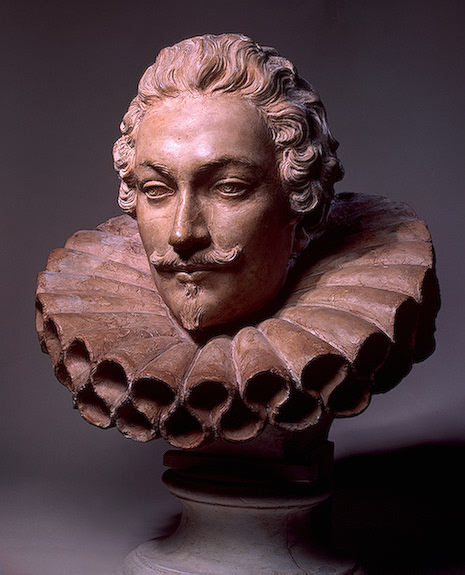
Camillo Francesco Maria Pamphili

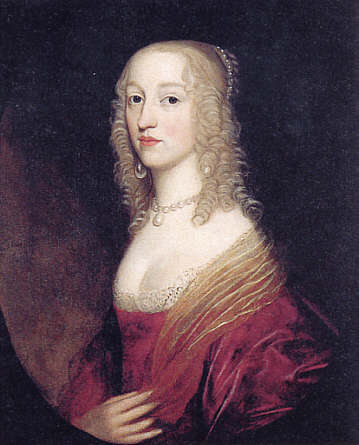
Louise Hollandine of the Palatinate

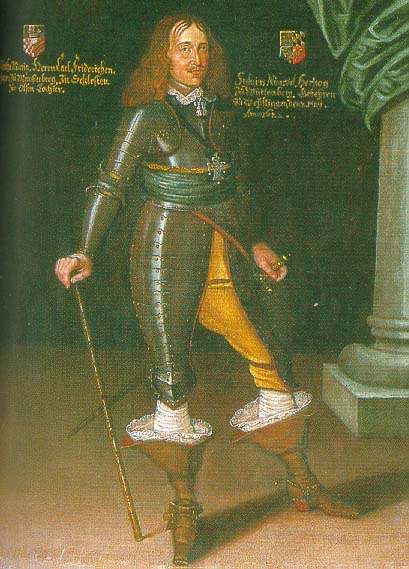
Silvius I Nimrod, Duke of Württemberg-Oels

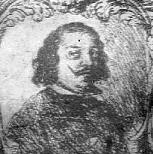
Juan de Valdés Leal

=== January–March ===
- January 1 – Isaac Sweers, Dutch admiral (d. 1673)
- January 3 – Sir Humphrey Winch, 1st Baronet, English Member of Parliament (d. 1703)
- January 11 – Louis, Duke of Joyeuse, younger son of Charles (d. 1654)
- January 13 – Thomas Dolman, English politician (d. 1697)
- January 15 – Molière, French playwright (d. 1673)
- January 16 – Anna Margareta von Haugwitz, Swedish countess (d. 1673)
- January 23 – Abraham Diepraam, Dutch painter (d. 1670)
- January 28
  - Adrien Auzout, French astronomer (d. 1691)
  - Richard Verney, 11th Baron Willoughby de Broke, English baron (d. 1711)
- February 7 – Vittoria della Rovere, Italian noble (d. 1694)
- February 15 – Adam Pynacker, Dutch painter (d. 1673)
- February 21 – Camillo Francesco Maria Pamphili, Italian Catholic cardinal (d. 1666)
- February 24 – Johannes Clauberg, German theologian and philosopher (d. 1665)
- February 25 – Christian Louis, Duke of Brunswick-Lüneburg (d. 1665)
- February 26 – Ludovico Maria Sinistrari, Italian Franciscan priest and author (d. 1701)
- February 27 – Carel Fabritius, Dutch painter (d. 1654)
- March 4 – Thomas Fox, English lawyer and politician (d. 1666)
- March 10 – Johann Rahn, Swiss mathematician (d. 1676)
- March 28 – Ermes di Colorêt, Italian poet, political figure (d. 1692)

=== April–June ===
- April 5 – Vincenzo Viviani, Italian mathematician and scientist (d. 1703)
- April 7 – Carlo Pio di Savoia, Italian Catholic cardinal (d. 1689)
- April 8 – Lebrecht, Prince of Anhalt-Köthen, German prince of the House of Ascania (d. 1669)
- April 10 – Samuel Wilbur, Jr., American colonial settler of Rhode Island (d. 1697)
- April 11 – Jan van Vliet, Dutch linguist (d. 1666)
- April 12 – Johann Christian von Boyneburg, German politician (d. 1672)
- April 18 – Louise Hollandine of the Palatinate, German artist (d. 1709)
- April 23 – Sir Arthur Onslow, 1st Baronet, English politician (d. 1688)
- April 30 – Giovanni Maria Morandi, Italian painter (d. 1717)
- May 1
  - Daniel Clasen, German academic (d. 1678)
  - Sir Henry Goring, 2nd Baronet, English politician (d. 1702)
- May 2 – Silvius I Nimrod, Duke of Württemberg-Oels (d. 1664)
- May 4 – Juan de Valdés Leal, Spanish painter and etcher (d. 1690)
- May 8
  - Capel Luckyn, English Member of Parliament (d. 1680)
  - Claes Rålamb, Swedish statesman (d. 1698)
- May 9 – Jean Pecquet, French anatomist (d. 1674)
- May 22 – Louis de Buade de Frontenac, Governor of New France (d. 1698)
- June 6 – Claude-Jean Allouez, French Jesuit missionary and explorer of North America (d. 1689)
- June 11 – Samuel Fortrey, English author (d. 1681)
- June 23 – Sir Richard Cust, 1st Baronet, English politician (d. 1700)
- June 24 – Charles Worsley, English soldier and politician (d. 1656)

=== July–September ===
- July 2 – René-François de Sluse, Walloon mathematician (d. 1685)
- July 14 – Sir William Armine, 2nd Baronet, English politician (d. 1658)
- July 26 – Christian Augustus, Count Palatine of Sulzbach (1632-1708) (d. 1708)
- July 28 – George Montagu, English politician (d. 1681)
- August 3 – Wolfgang Julius, Count of Hohenlohe-Neuenstein, German field marshal (d. 1698)
- August 6 – Tjerk Hiddes de Vries, Dutch admiral (d. 1666)
- August 19 – James Compton, 3rd Earl of Northampton, English politician (d. 1681)
- August 24 – Samuel Lincoln, American colonial ancestor of Abraham Lincoln (d. 1690)
- August 27 – Jakob Thomasius, German philosopher (d. 1684)
- September 21 – Yamaga Sokō, Japanese philosopher (d. 1685)
- September 22 – Jacques Savary, successful French merchant (d. 1690)
- September 24 – Georg Händel, German musician (d. 1697)
- September 30 – Johann Sebastiani, German Baroque composer (d. 1683)

=== October–December ===
- October 13 – Sir Ralph Delaval, 1st Baronet, English politician (d. 1691)
- October 15 – Magnus Gabriel De la Gardie, Swedish statesman and military man (d. 1686)
- November 8 – Charles X Gustav, King of Sweden (d. 1660)
- November 15 – Anthony Ettrick, English politician (d. 1703)
- November 30
  - Thomas van Apshoven, Flemish painter (d. 1664)
  - Robert van den Hoecke, Flemish painter (d. 1668)
- December 16 – Cort Adeler, Dutch seaman (d. 1675)
- December 21 – Tomasz Młodzianowski, Polish Jesuit, preacher and writer (d. 1686)
- December 22 – Emanuel Murant, Dutch painter (d. 1700)
- December 27 – Teofil Rutka, Polish philosopher (d. 1700)
- December 29 – Thomas Herle, English politician (d. 1681)

1623

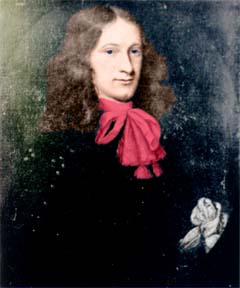
Wilhelmus Beekman

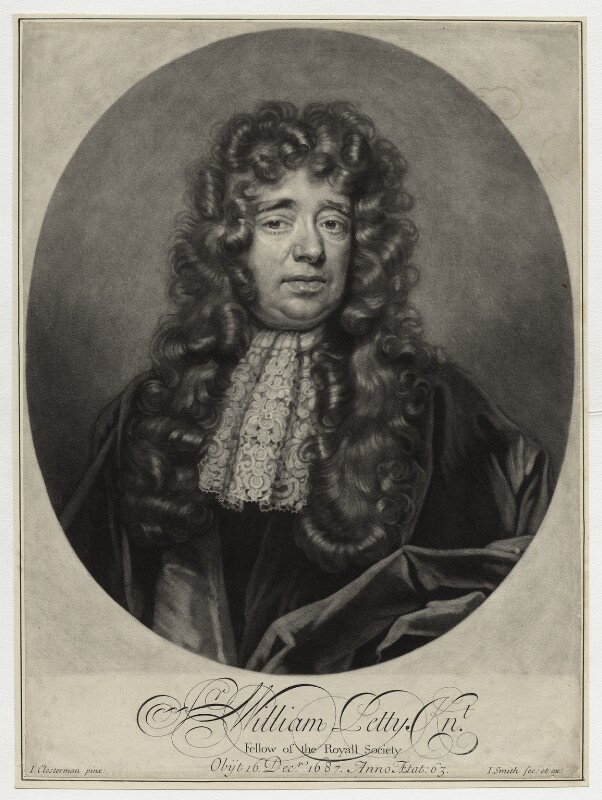
William Petty

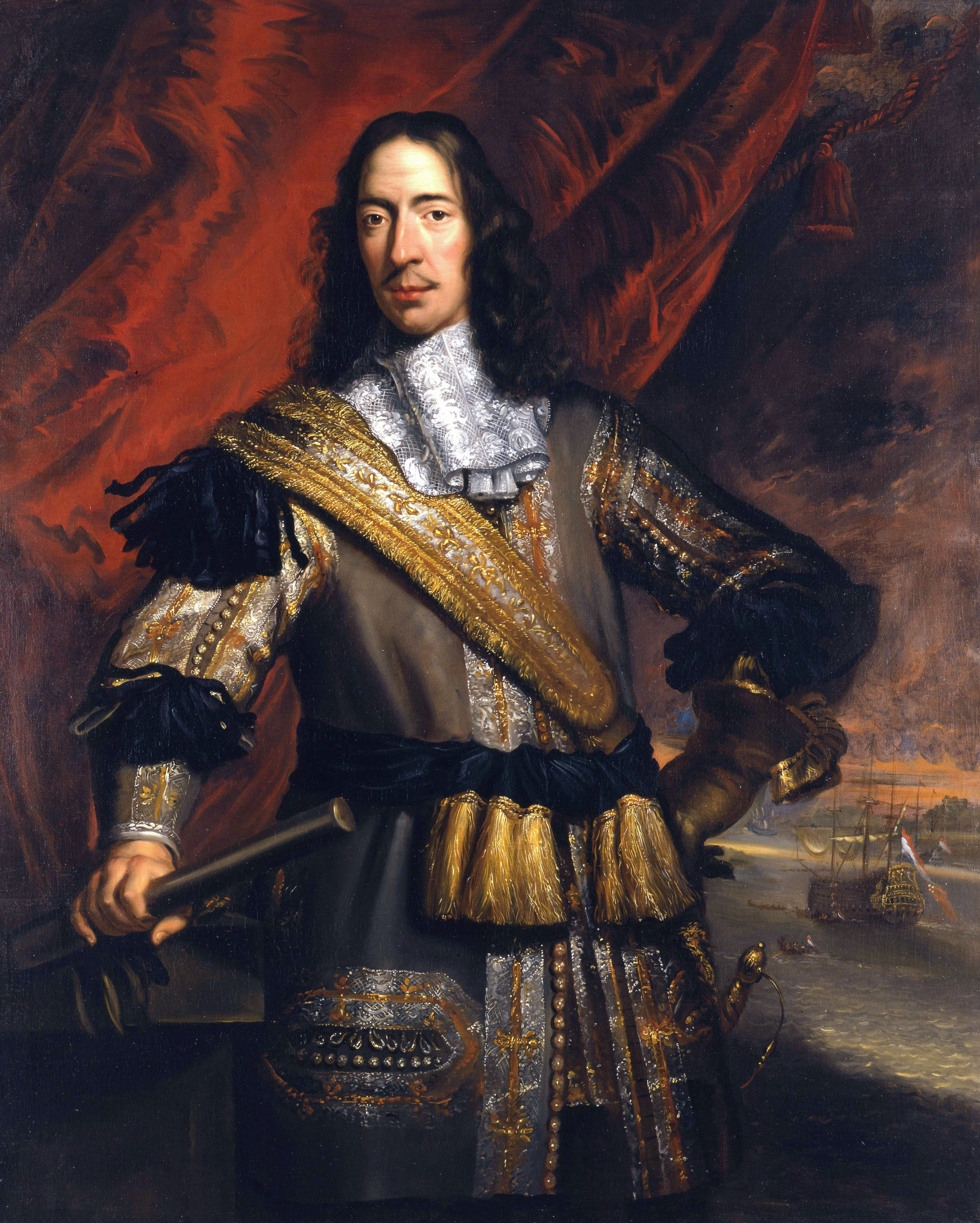
Cornelis de Witt

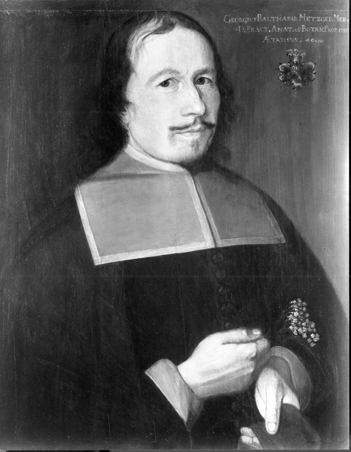
Georg Balthasar Metzger

=== January–March ===
- January 1 – Marie Eleonore of Dietrichstein, German noblewoman, by birth member of the House of Dietrichstein, and by her two marriages Countess of Kaunitz and Oppersdorf (d. 1687)
- January 15 – Algernon Sidney, British philosopher (d. 1683)
- March 4 – Jacob van der Does, Dutch landscape painter (d. 1673)
- March 5 – Henri Sauval, French historian (d. 1676)
- March 23 – Deane Winthrop, English-born colonist of British America, 6th son of Governor John Winthrop (d. 1704)
- March 24 – Sir Ralph Hare, 1st Baronet, English politician (d. 1672)

=== April–June ===
- April 7 – Thomas Mainwaring, English politician (d. 1689)
- April 11 – Decio Azzolino, Italian Catholic cardinal (d. 1689)
- April 20 – Olimpia Aldobrandini, Italian Aldobrandini family member, heiress (d. 1681)
- April 23 – Sir John Chichester, 1st Baronet, English politician (d. 1667)
- April 27 – Gryzelda Konstancja Zamoyska, Polish noble (d. 1672)
- April 28 – Wilhelmus Beekman, Dutch politician (d. 1707)
- April 30 – François de Laval, French-born priest, first Catholic bishop of Quebec (d. 1708)
- May 26 – William Petty, English scientist, philosopher and economist (d. 1687)
- May 29 – David Schirmer, German lyric poet and librarian (d. 1686)
- May 30
  - John Egerton, 2nd Earl of Bridgewater, English politician (d. 1686)
  - Wallerant Vaillant, painter of the Dutch Golden Age (d. 1677)
- June 8 – Paluzzo Paluzzi Altieri degli Albertoni, Italian Catholic cardinal (d. 1698)
- June 15 – Cornelis de Witt, Dutch politician (d. 1672)
- June 19 – Blaise Pascal, French mathematician, physicist and philosopher (d. 1662)
- June 29 – Inaba Masanori, Japanese daimyō (d. 1696)

=== July–September ===
- July 1 – William Owfield, English landowner and politician (d. 1664)
- July 6 – Jacopo Melani, Italian composer and violinist (d. 1676)
- July 12 – Elizabeth Walker, English pharmacist (d. 1690)
- July 28 – Allen Brodrick, English politician (d. 1680)
- August 4 – Friedrich Casimir, Count of Hanau-Lichtenberg (1641–1680) and Hanau-Münzenberg (1642–1680) (d. 1685)
- August 5 (baptism) – Antonio Cesti, Italian composer (d. 1669)
- August 13 – Sir John Morden, 1st Baronet, English politician (d. 1708)
- August 14 – Sir John Fowell, 2nd Baronet, English politician (d. 1677)
- August 23 – Stanisław Lubieniecki, Polish Socinian theologist (d. 1675)
- August 25 – Filippo Lauri, Italian painter (d. 1694)
- August 26 – Johann Sigismund Elsholtz, German naturalist and physician (d. 1688)
- September 1 – Caspar Schamberger, German surgeon and merchant (d. 1706)
- September 8 – James Bellingham, English politician (d. 1650)
- September 10 – Carpoforo Tencalla, Swiss-Italian Baroque painter of canvases and frescoes (d. 1685)
- September 13 – Pieter Wouwerman, Dutch painter (d. 1682)
- September 21 – Sir John Bowyer, 1st Baronet, English soldier and politician (d. 1666)
- September 23 – Georg Balthasar Metzger, German physician and scientist (d. 1687)

=== October–December ===
- October 4 – Robert Thoroton, English antiquary (d. 1678)
- October 9 – Ferdinand Verbiest, Flemish Jesuit missionary in China during the Qing dynasty (d. 1688)
- October 17 – Francis Turretin, Swiss-Italian Reformed scholastic theologian (d. 1687)
- October 28 – Johann Grueber, Austrian Jesuit missionary and astronomer in China (d. 1680)
- November 1 – Zhu Youlang, Prince of Gui, the Yongli Emperor, the 4th and last emperor of the Southern Ming dynasty of China (d. 1662)
- November 5 – Mariana of the Purification, Portuguese nun of the Carmelite Order of the Ancient Observance (d. 1695)
- November 17 – Philip Sherard, English politician (d. 1695)
- November 22 – Bussy Mansell, Welsh member of the Parliament of England (d. 1699)
- November 28 – Giovanni Battista Caccioli, Italian painter (d. 1675)
- December 1 – Christian Louis I, Duke of Mecklenburg-Schwerin (1658–1692) (d. 1692)
- December 8 – Ernest, Landgrave of Hesse-Rheinfels and later of Hessen-Rheinfels-Rotenburg (d. 1693)
- December 13 – Marc-René de Voyer de Paulmy d'Argenson, French politician and diplomat (d. 1700)
- December 16 – Ercole, Marquis of Baux, member of the House of Grimaldi (d. 1651)
- December 23 – Matthias Palbitzki, Swedish diplomat and art-connoisseur (d. 1677)
- December 28 – Elisabeth Augusta Lindenov, daughter of king Christian IV of Denmark (d. 1677)

=== Date unknown ===
- Margaret Cavendish, Duchess of Newcastle-upon-Tyne, English biographer, poet and philosopher (d. 1673)
- Mary Fisher, English-born Quaker preacher and missionary (d. 1698)
- Dorothy, Lady Pakington, English religious writer (d. 1679)
- Francis Talbot, 11th Earl of Shrewsbury, English Royalist (d. 1667)

1624

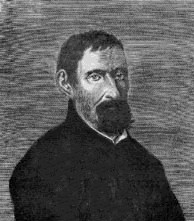
Guarino Guarini

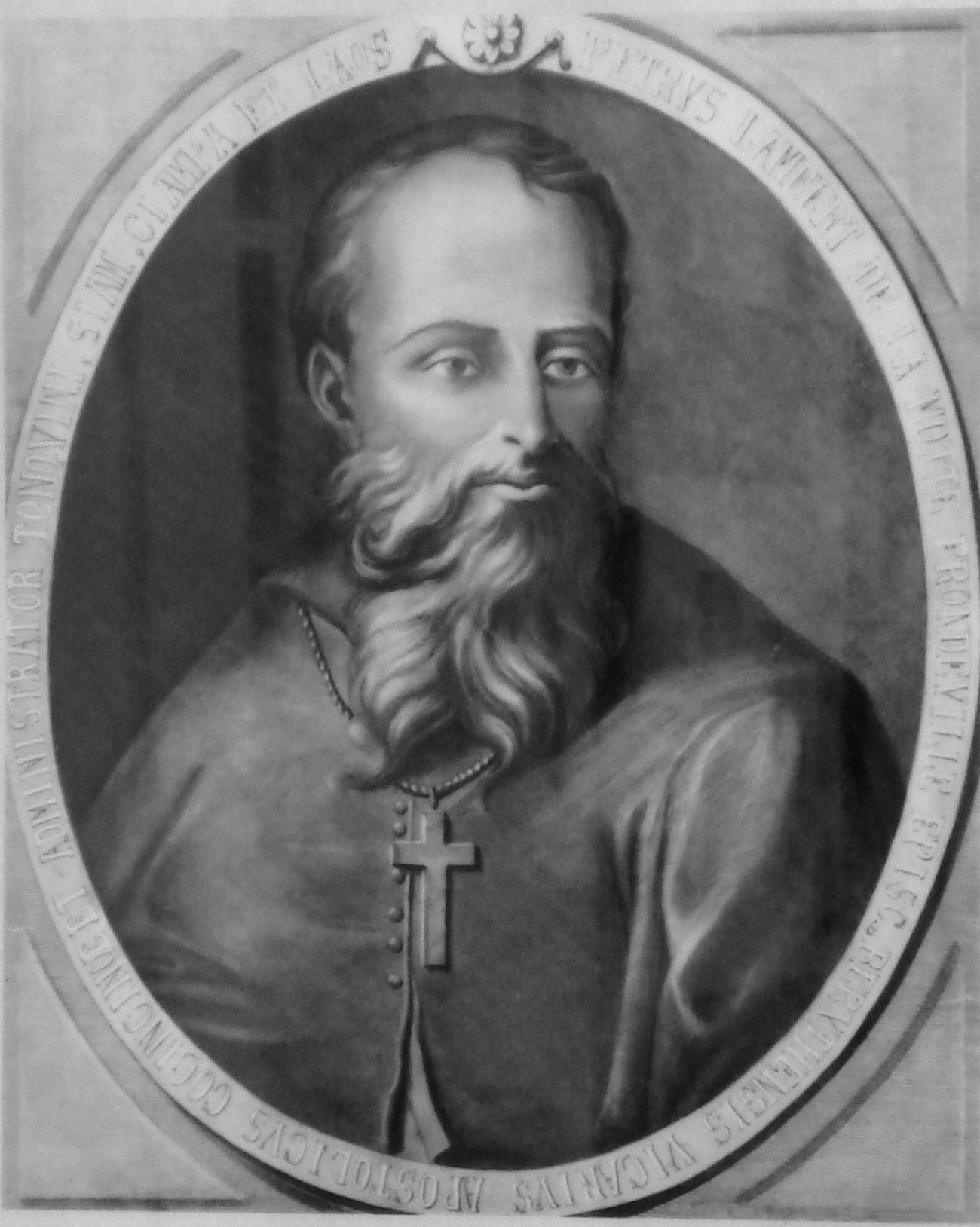
Pierre Lambert de la Motte

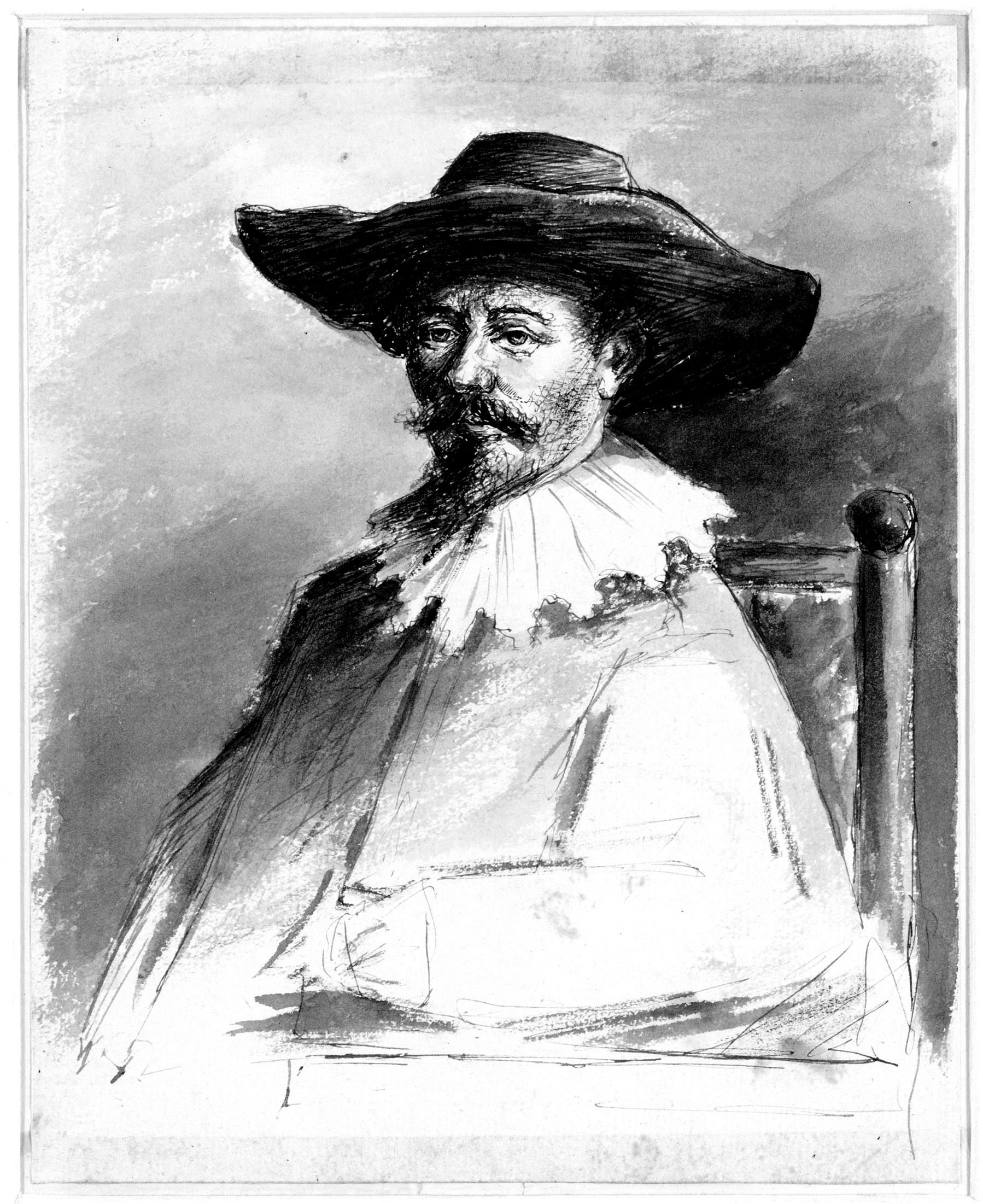
Lambert Doomer

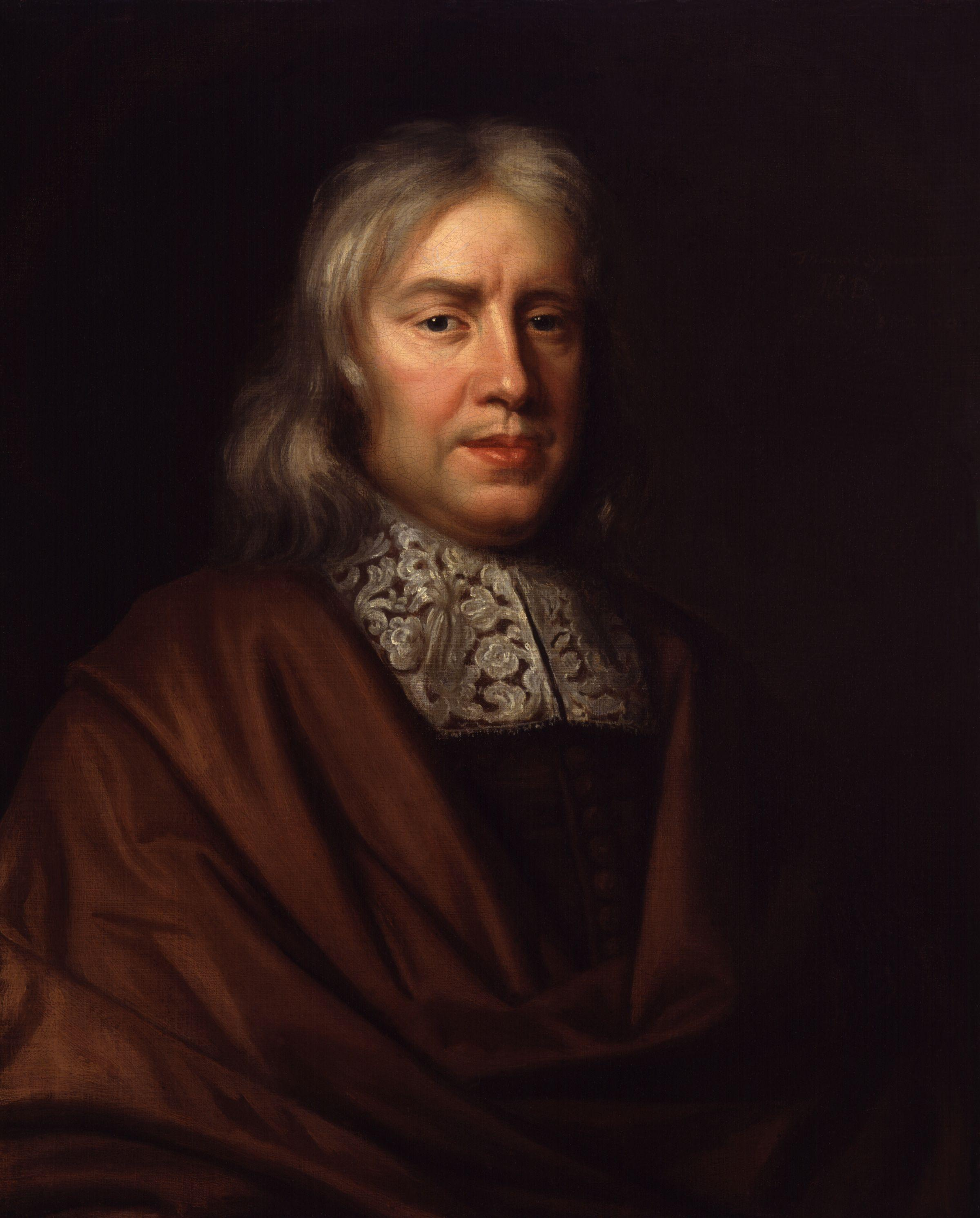
Thomas Sydenham

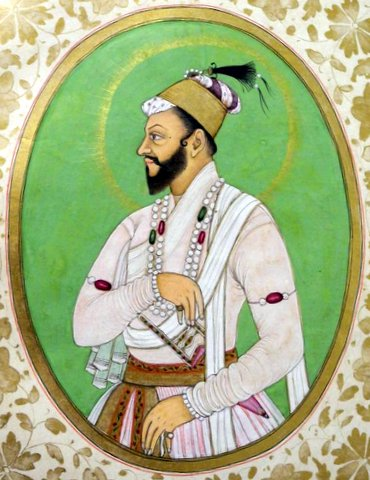
Murad Bakhsh

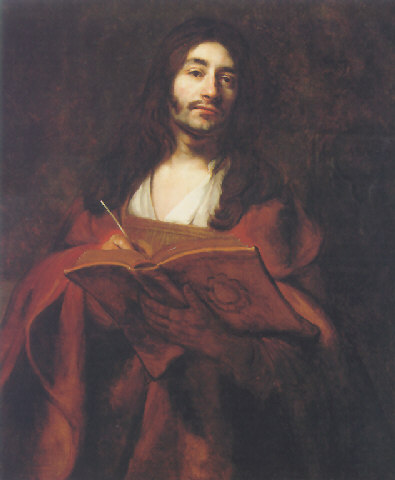
Barent Fabritius

=== January–March ===
- January 7 – Guarino Guarini, Italian architect of the Piedmontese Baroque (d. 1683)
- January 9 – Empress Meishō of Japan (d. 1696)
- January 15 – Rombout Verhulst, Dutch sculptor (d. 1698)
- January 16 – Pierre Lambert de la Motte, French bishop (d. 1679)
- January 18 – Thyrsus González de Santalla, Spanish theologian elected Superior General of the Society of Jesus (d. 1705)
- January 26 – George William, Duke of Brunswick-Lüneburg (d. 1705)
- January 31 – Arnold Geulincx, Flemish philosopher (d. 1669)
- February 11
  - Ivan Ančić, Croatian theological writer (d. 1685)
  - Lambert Doomer, Dutch Golden Age landscape painter (d. 1700)
- February 23 – Robert Treat, American colonial leader (d. 1710)
- March – Jane Leade, English esotericist (d. 1704)
- March 6 – Johann Georg Albinus, German pastor and hymnist (d. 1679)
- March 12 – Damian Hartard von der Leyen-Hohengeroldseck, German archbishop (d. 1678)
- March 20 – William Jones, English lawyer, Deputy Governor of Connecticut (d. 1706)
- March 21
  - François Roberday, French Baroque organist and composer (d. 1680)
  - Paolo Segneri, Italian Jesuit (d. 1694)
- March 25 – William Pulteney, English Member of Parliament (d. 1691)
- March 31 – Antoine Pagi, French ecclesiastical historian (d. 1699)

=== April–June ===
- April 4 – François Marie, Prince of Lillebonne, French nobleman and member of the House of Lorraine (d. 1694)
- April 9 – Henrik Rysensteen, Dutch military engineer (d. 1679)
- April 12 – Charles Amadeus, Duke of Nemours (d. 1652)
- April 15 – Pieter Nijs, Dutch Golden Age painter (d. 1681)
- April 20 – Samuel Mearne, English Restoration bookbinder and publisher (d. 1683)
- April 24 – Jan Peeters I, Flemish Baroque painter (d. 1677)
- April 25 – Sir Lionel Tollemache, 3rd Baronet, English baronet (d. 1669)
- April 26 – Johann Leusden, Dutch Calvinist theologian (d. 1699)
- May 13 – Aleksander Kazimierz Sapieha, Polish nobleman and archbishop (d. 1671)
- May 23 – William Duckett, English politician (d. 1686)
- May 30 – Leopold Frederick, Duke of Württemberg-Montbéliard, German noble (d. 1662)
- June 11 – Jean-Baptiste du Hamel, French cleric and natural philosopher (d. 1706)
- June 15 – Hiob Ludolf, German orientalist (d. 1704)
- June 16 – William Bradford, American political and military leader (d. 1703)
- June 20 – Henry Albin, English minister (d. 1696)
- June 26 – James Scudamore, English politician (d. 1668)

=== July–September ===
- July – George Fox, English founder of the Quakers (d. 1691)
- July 11 – John Collins, English academic and politician (d. 1711)
- July 18 – Francis Pemberton, English judge, Lord Chief Justice of the King's Bench (d. 1697)
- August 6 – Charles Kerr, 2nd Earl of Ancram, English politician (d. 1690)
- August 11 – John Strode, English politician (d. 1679)
- August 22 – Jean Regnault de Segrais, French poet and novelist born in Caen (d. 1701)
- August 23 – Anna Elisabeth of Saxe-Lauenburg, Landgravine consort of Hesse-Homburg (d. 1688)
- August 24 – Petronella de la Court, Dutch art collector (d. 1707)
- August 25 – François de la Chaise, French churchman (d. 1709)
- August 27 – Koxinga, Chinese military leader (d. 1662)
- September 1 – Simón González de Acosta, Spanish colonial governor (d. 1653)
- September 10 – Thomas Sydenham, English physician (d. 1689)
- September 12 – Wingfield Cromwell, 2nd Earl of Ardglass, English nobleman (d. 1668)
- September 15 – Francesco Provenzale, Italian Baroque composer and teacher (d. 1704)

=== October–December ===
- October 5 (bapt.) – Gaspar de Witte, Flemish painter (d. 1681)
- October 9 – Murad Bakhsh, Mughal prince (d. 1661)
- October 19 – Robert Danvers, English politician (d. 1674)
- October 20 – Jan Albertsz Rotius, Dutch painter (d. 1666)
- October 21 – Edward Harley, English politician (d. 1700)
- October 26 – Dosoftei, Moldavian Metropolitan (d. 1693)
- October 30 – Paul Pellisson, French author (d. 1693)
- November 2 – Sir Thomas Myddelton, 1st Baronet, English politician (d. 1663)
- November 3 – Jean II d'Estrées, French noble (d. 1707)
- November 16 – Barent Fabritius, Dutch painter (d. 1673)
- November 28 – Angélique de Saint-Jean Arnauld d'Andilly, French Jansenist nun (d. 1684)
- December 16 – Queen Jangnyeol, Korean royal consort (d. 1688)
- December 17 – Juriaen Jacobsze, Dutch painter (d. 1685)
- December 18 – John Hull, American colonial merchant and politician (d. 1683)
- December 25 – Angelus Silesius, German writer (d. 1677)

=== Date unknown ===
- Louise de Prie, French royal governess (d. 1709)
- Torii Tadaharu, Japanese nobleman (d. 1651)
- William Tucker, first known African-American born in the Colony of Virginia (d. unknown)

=== Approximate date ===
- Female Greenland shark (still alive in 21st century).

1625

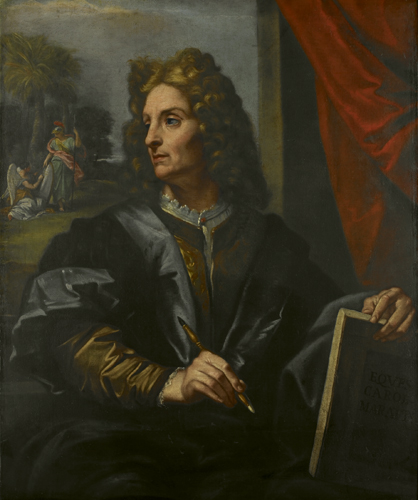
Carlo Maratta

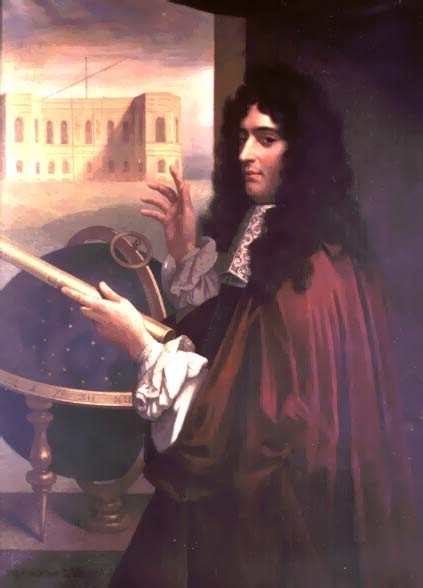
Giovanni Domenico Cassini

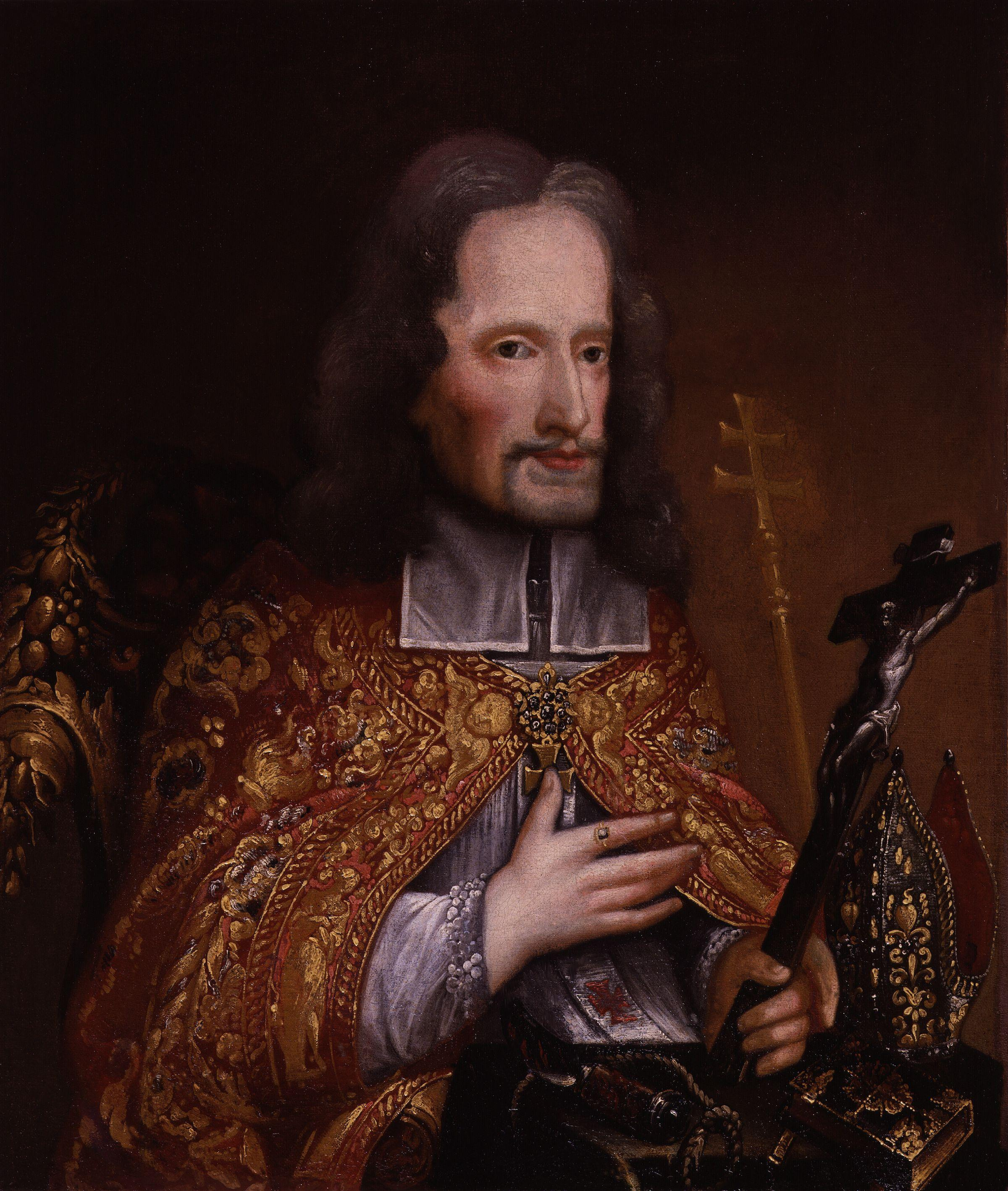
Oliver Plunkett

=== January–March ===
- January 29 – Thieleman J. van Braght, Dutch Anabaptist author (d. 1664)
- February 1 – Leopold Louis, Count Palatine of Veldenz, German noble (d. 1694)
- February 9 – Jobst Herman, Count of Lippe, Sternberg and Schwalenberg (d. 1678)
- February 14 – Maria Eufrosyne of Zweibrücken, Swedish princess (d. 1687)
- February 18 – Giovanni Giuseppe Cosattini, Italian painter (d. 1699)
- February 21 – Joan Huydecoper II, Dutch mayor (d. 1704)
- March 1 – William Gregory, English politician and judge (d. 1696)
- March 14 – Daniel Gittard, French architect (d. 1686)
- March 25
  - Ann, Lady Fanshawe, English memoirist (d. 1680)
  - John Collins, English mathematician (d. 1683)

=== April–June ===
- April 4 – Sir John Drake, 1st Baronet, English Member of Parliament (d. 1669)
- April 5 – Domenico Maria Canuti, Italian painter of the Baroque period (d. 1684)
- April 18 – Sir John Baber, English physician to Charles II (d. 1704)
- April 25 – John Frederick, Duke of Brunswick-Lüneburg, Duke of Brunswick-Calenberg (1665–1679) (d. 1679)
- May 9 – George Pitt, English politician (d. 1694)
- May 11 – Elisabeth Marie, Duchess of Oels, Regent of Oels (1664–1672) (d. 1686)
- May 13 – Carlo Maratta, Italian painter (d. 1713)
- May 23 – John Louis, Count of Nassau-Ottweiler (d. 1690)
- May 25
  - John Davies, Welsh translator and writer (d. 1693)
  - Gaspar Téllez-Girón, 5th Duke de Osuna, Spanish duke (d. 1694)
- June 8 – Giovanni Domenico Cassini, Italian astronomer and engineer (d. 1712)
- June 9 – Sarah Rapelje, the "first white child" born in New Netherland (d. 1685)
- June 10 – János Apáczai Csere, Hungarian mathematician (d. 1659)
- June 16 – Samuel Chappuzeau, French scholar (d. 1701)
- June 17 – Peder Hansen Resen, Danish historian (d. 1688)
- June 22 – Henry Cromwell-Williams, English politician (d. 1673)
- June 23 – John Fell, English churchman and influential academic (d. 1686)

=== July–September ===
- July 10 – Jean Herauld Gourville, French adventurer (d. 1703)
- July 27 – Edward Montagu, 1st Earl of Sandwich (d. 1672)
- July 30 – Philippe François, 1st Duke of Arenberg (d. 1674)
- August 9 – Hans Rosing, Norwegian bishop (d. 1699)
- August 10
  - Johann Deutschmann, German Lutheran theologian (d. 1706)
  - Augustine Reding, Swiss abbot and theologian (d. 1692)
- August 13 – Rasmus Bartholin, Danish physician and scientist (d. 1698)
- August 14 – François de Harlay de Champvallon, Archbishop of Paris (d. 1695)
- August 20 – Thomas Corneille, French dramatist (d. 1709)
- August 21 – John Claypole, English politician (d. 1688)
- September 2 – Federico Baldeschi Colonna, Italian Catholic cardinal (d. 1691)
- September 4 – Johan van Rensselaer, Dutch noble (d. 1663)
- September 5 – Charles II Otto, Count Palatine of Zweibrücken-Birkenfeld (1669–1671) (d. 1671)
- September 7 – Henry Frederick, Count of Hohenlohe-Langenburg (1628–1699) (d. 1699)
- September 8 – William Bond, first Speaker of the Massachusetts Province House of Representatives (d. 1695)
- September 13 – Thomas Reynell, English politician (d. 1698)
- September 16 – Gregorio Barbarigo, Italian Catholic saint (d. 1697)
- September 23 – Ferdinand Maximilian, Hereditary Prince of Baden-Baden, father of Louis William, Margrave of Baden-Baden (d. 1669)
- September 24 – Johan de Witt, Dutch politician (d. 1672)

=== October–December ===
- October 2 – Vere Essex Cromwell, 4th Earl of Ardglass, English noble (d. 1687)
- October 4 – Jacqueline Pascal, French child prodigy and sister of Blaise Pascal (d. 1661)
- October 5 – Edward, Count Palatine of Simmern (d. 1663)
- October 6 – Francis Small, English trader and landowner residing primarily in Kittery, Maine (d. 1714)
- October 9 – Jacques Henri de Durfort de Duras, French noble (d. 1704)
- October 10 – Erik Dahlbergh, Swedish engineer, soldier and field marshal (d. 1703)
- October 19 – Pierre Nicole, French Jansenist (d. 1695)
- October 23 – Charles Cheyne, 1st Viscount Newhaven, English Member of Parliament (d. 1698)
- October 26 – Michał Kazimierz Radziwiłł, Polish-Lithuanian noble (d. 1680)
- October 31 – Christen Jensen Lodberg, Danish bishop (d. 1693)
- November 1 – Oliver Plunkett, Irish archbishop, martyr and saint (d. 1681)
- November 7 – Henri II, Duke of Nemours, 7th Duc de Nemours (1652–59) (d. 1659)
- November 8 – Mary Rich, Countess of Warwick, 7th daughter of Richard Boyle (d. 1678)
- November 12 – Sir Edward Dering, 2nd Baronet, Irish politician (d. 1684)
- November 13 – William Christoph, Landgrave of Hesse-Homburg, Germany (d. 1681)
- November 20
  - Tønne Huitfeldt, Norwegian landowner and military officer (d. 1677)
  - Paulus Potter, Dutch painter (d. 1654)
- November 30 – Jean Domat, French jurist (d. 1696)
- December 8 – Margaret Mostyn, English Carmelite nun (d. 1679)
- December 10 – Melchior Barthel, German sculptor (d. 1672)
- December 14 – Barthélemy d'Herbelot de Molainville, French orientalist (d. 1695)
- December 16 – Erhard Weigel, German mathematician, astronomer and philosopher (d. 1699)
- December 20
  - Tamás Esterházy, Hungarian noble (d. 1652)
  - David Gregory, Scottish physician and inventor (d. 1720)
- December 24 – Johann Rudolph Ahle, German composer and organist (d. 1673)

=== Date unknown ===
- Margareta Beijer, director of the Swedish royal post office (d. 1675)

1626

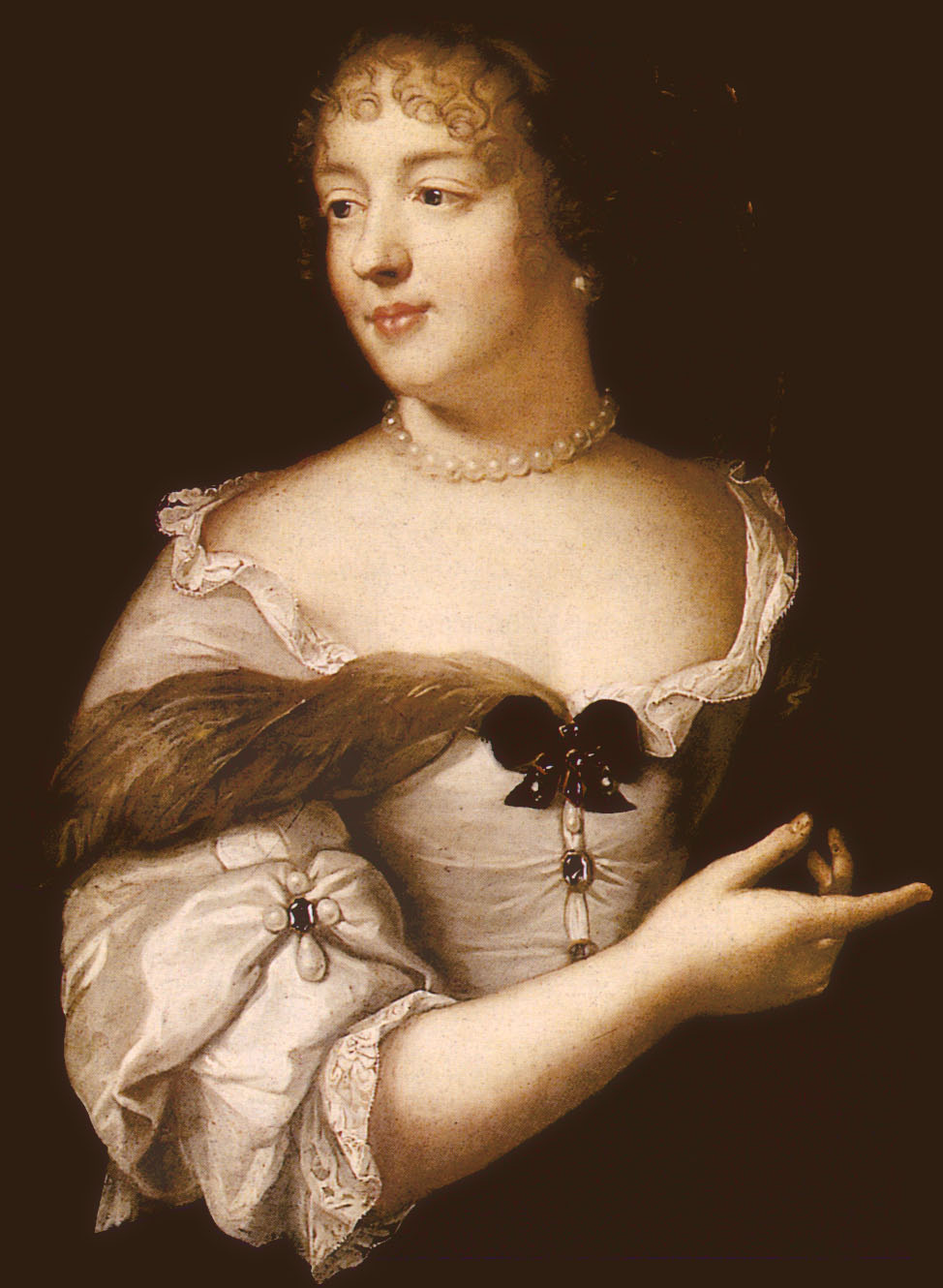
Marie de Rabutin-Chantal, marquise de Sévigné

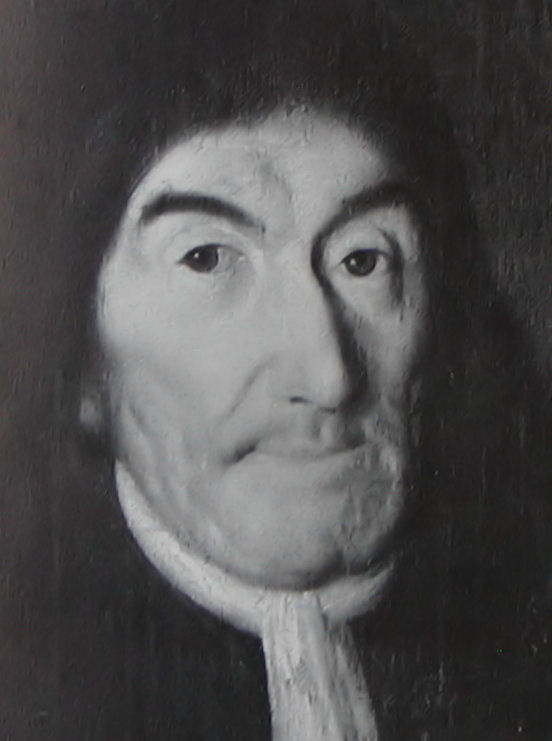
Louis Hennepin

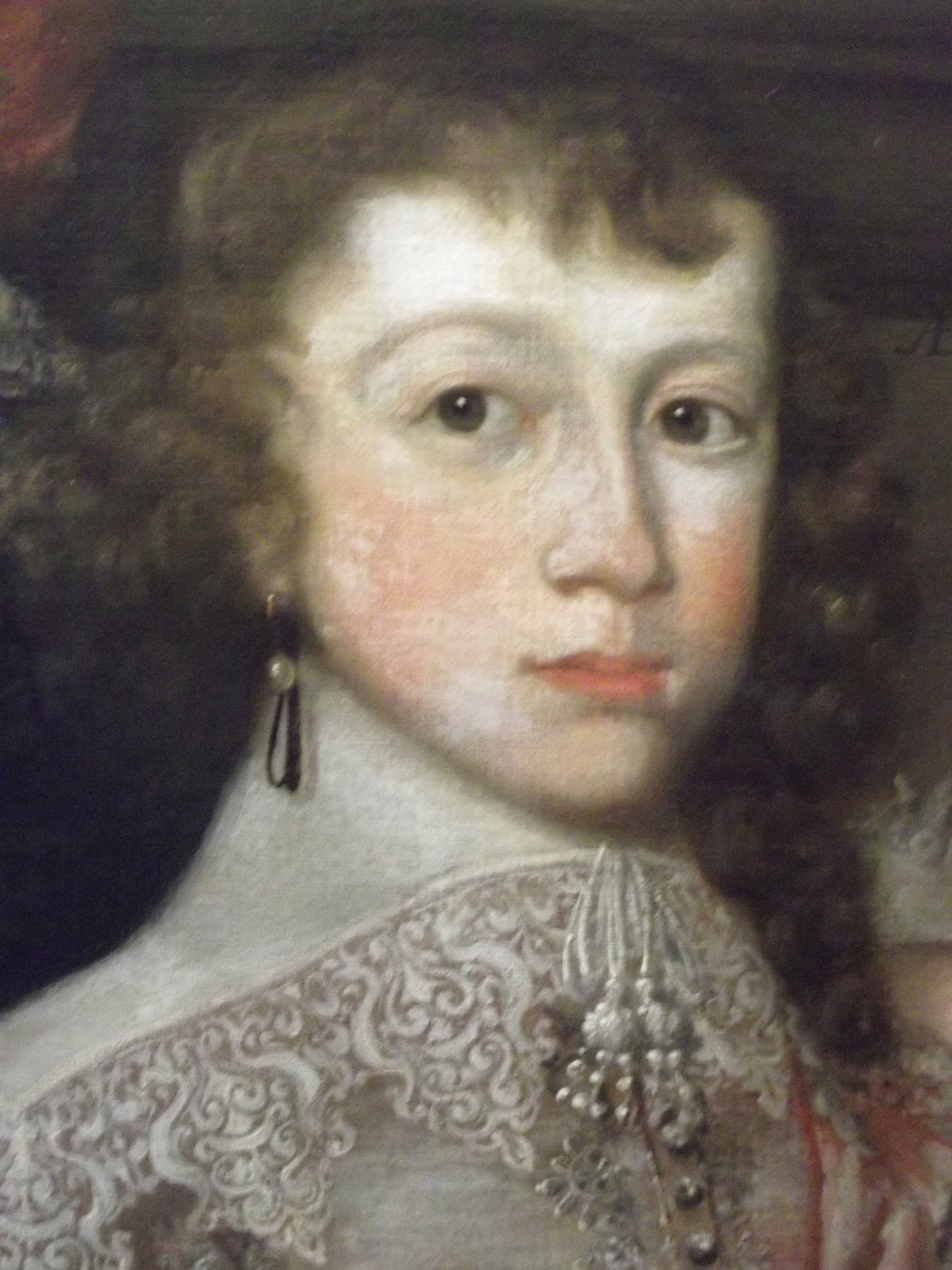
Richard Ottley

=== January–March ===
- January 9 – Armand Jean le Bouthillier de Rancé, French founder of the Trappist Order (d. 1700)
- January 13 – Johann Philipp of Hanau-Lichtenberg, German nobleman (d. 1669)
- January 25 – Edward Evelyn, British politician (d. 1692)
- February 5 – Marie de Rabutin-Chantal, marquise de Sévigné, French aristocrat and writer (d. 1696)
- February 7 – Fabian von Fersen, Swedish soldier and statesman (d. 1677)
- February 18 – Francesco Redi, Italian physician (d. 1697)
- March 3 – John Hele, English politician (d. 1661)
- March 9 – Lorentz Mortensen Angell, Norwegian merchant and landowner (d. 1697)
- March 10 – Cornelis Van Caukercken, Flemish engraver, printseller (d. 1680)
- March 12 – John Aubrey, English antiquary and writer (d. 1697)
- March 16 – Cornelius Van Steenwyk, American politician (d. 1684)
- March 21 – Peter of Saint Joseph Betancur, Spanish Catholic saint, missionary to Guatemala (d. 1667)
- March 30 – Atto Melani, Italian opera singer (d. 1714)

=== April–June ===
- April 16 – Robert Harley, English politician (d. 1673)
- April 10 – Franz Egon of Fürstenberg, German count in the Holy Roman Empire (d. 1682)
- April 23 – Maurice Henry, Prince of Nassau-Hadamar (1653–1679) (d. 1679)
- April 25 – Sigmund von Birken, German Baroque poet (d. 1681)
- May 10 – Jan Jacobszoon Hinlopen, Dutch art collector and merchant (d. 1666)
- May 12 – Louis Hennepin, Roman Catholic priest, missionary of the Franciscan Recollet Order (French (d. 1704)
- May 14 – Willem Joseph van Ghent, Dutch admiral (d. 1672)
- May 16 – Andrea Carlone, Italian painter (d. 1697)
- May 17 – Countess Palatine Eleonora Catherine of Zweibrücken, sister of King Charles X of Sweden (d. 1692)
- May 21 – Wolfgang Carl Briegel, German organist and composer (d. 1712)
- May 27 – William II, Prince of Orange (d. 1650)
- June 8 – William Wentworth, 2nd Earl of Strafford, member of England's House of Lords (d. 1695)
- June 9 – Sir John Newton, 2nd Baronet, English Member of Parliament (d. 1699)
- June 18 – John Mordaunt, 1st Viscount Mordaunt, English politician (d. 1675)
- June 29 – Jeffrey Daniel, English politician (d. 1681)

=== July–September ===
- July 15
  - Christiane Sehested, daughter of King Christian IV of Denmark, and his morganatic spouse Kirsten Munk (d. 1670)
  - Hedevig Ulfeldt, daughter of King Christian IV of Denmark and Kirsten Munk (d. 1678)
- July 17 – Henriette Marie of the Palatinate, German noble (d. 1651)
- August 1
  - Charles le Moyne de Longueuil et de Châteauguay, French colonist, interpreter (d. 1685)
  - Sabbatai Zevi, Sephardic Rabbi (d. 1676)
- August 5 – Richard Ottley, English politician (d. 1670)
- August 12 – Giovanni Legrenzi, Italian composer (d. 1690)
- September 7 – Maria Klara of Dietrichstein, German noblewoman (d. 1667)
- September 16 – Leopold Wilhelm of Baden-Baden, Imperial Field Marshal (d. 1671)
- September 27 – William Douglas, 2nd Lord Mordington, eldest son and heir of Sir James Douglas (d. 1671)
- September 28 – Elizabeth Maitland, Duchess of Lauderdale, influential British noblewoman (d. 1698)

=== October–December ===
- October 4 – Richard Cromwell, Lord Protector of England, Scotland, and Ireland (d. 1712)
- October 5 – George II, Duke of Württemberg-Montbéliard (1662–1699) (d. 1699)
- October 17 – Samuel Danforth, American Puritan minister, preacher, poet, astronomer, missionary (d. 1674)
- October 23 – Francis Marsh, Irish bishop (d. 1693)
- November 8
  - Matthew Marvin, Jr., Connecticut settler (d. 1712)
  - César-Pierre Richelet, French grammarian and lexicographer (d. 1698)
- November 30 – Cesare Pronti, Italian painter (d. 1708)
- December 8 – Queen Christina of Sweden (d. 1689)
- December 10 – George Christian, Landgrave of Hesse-Homburg (1669–1671) (d. 1677)
- December 12 – Giovanni Francesco Ginetti, nephew of Cardinal Marzio Ginetti (d. 1691)
- December 18 – William Stanhope, English politician (d. 1703)
- December 20 – Veit Ludwig von Seckendorff, German statesman (d. 1692)
- December 21 – Francis Scott, 2nd Earl of Buccleuch, son of Walter Scott (d. 1651)
- December 31 – Ladislaus, Count Esterházy, Hungarian noble (d. 1652)

1627

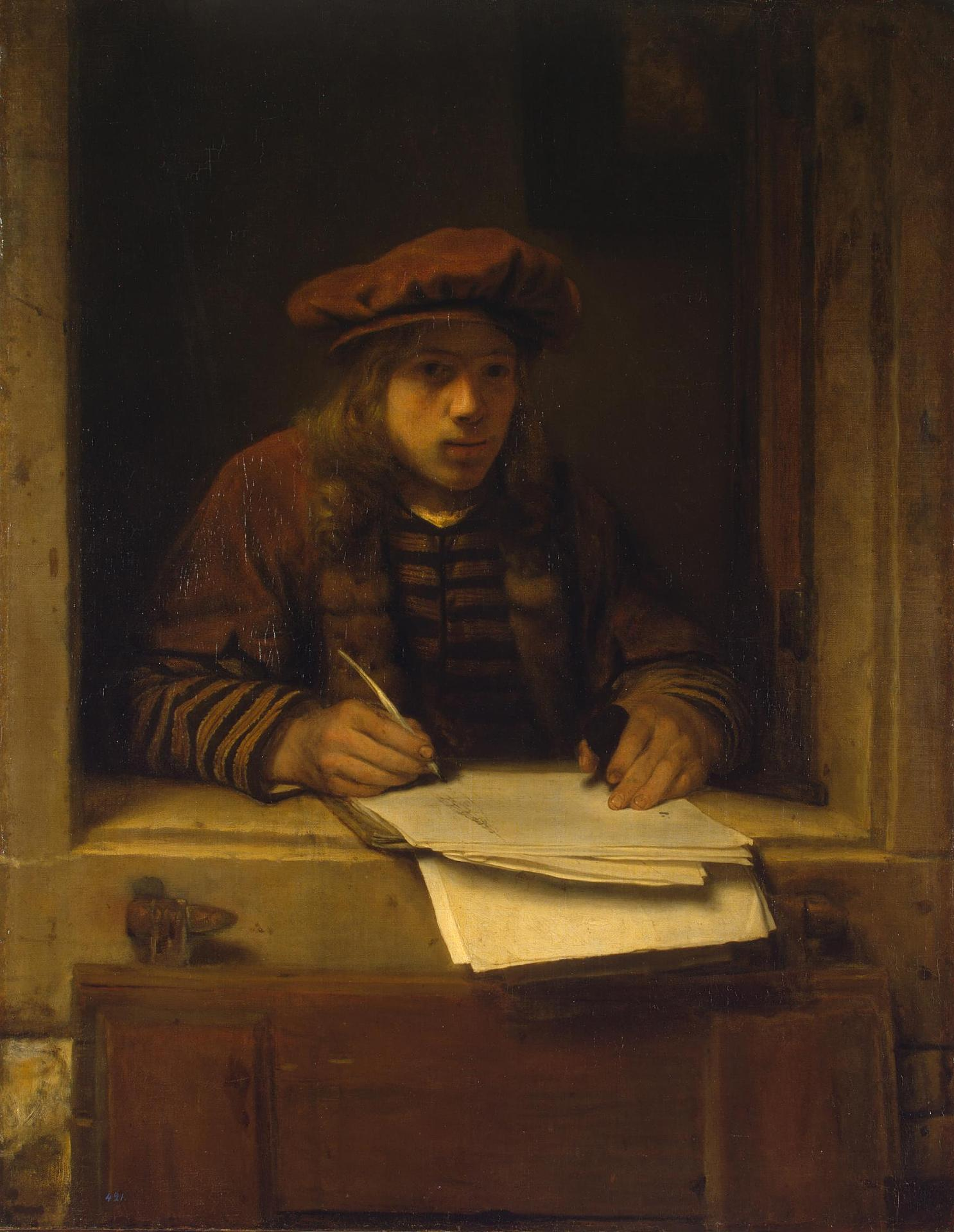
Samuel Dirksz van Hoogstraten

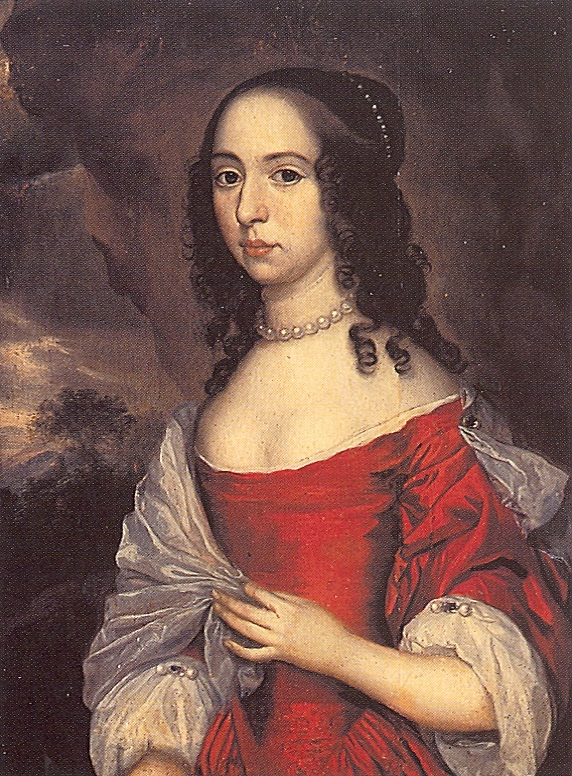
Countess Louise Henriette of Nassau

=== January–March ===
- January 25 – Robert Boyle, Anglo-Irish scientist (d. 1691)
- February 2 – Sir Robert Kemp, 2nd Baronet, English politician (d. 1710)
- February 10 – Cornelis de Bie, Flemish poet, jurist (d. 1715)
- February 15 – Charles Morton, Cornish nonconformist minister (d. 1698)
- February 21 – Philips Augustijn Immenraet, Flemish painter (d. 1679)
- February 28 – Aubrey de Vere, 20th Earl of Oxford (d. 1703)
- March 9
  - Thomas Howard, 5th Duke of Norfolk, English noble (d. 1677)
  - Walter Moyle, English politician (d. 1701)
- March 14 – Roelant Roghman, Dutch Golden Age painter (d. 1692)
- March 27 – Sir Stephen Fox, English politician (d. 1716)

=== April–June ===
- April 9 – Johann Caspar Kerll, German baroque composer and organist (d. 1693)
- April 22 – Tsarevna Irina Mikhailovna of Russia (d. 1679)
- May 4 – Giuseppe Francesco Borri, Italian alchemist (d. 1695)
- May 16
  - Willem van Aelst, Dutch artist (d. 1683)
  - Rudolph Augustus, Duke of Braunschweig-Wolfenbüttel (d. 1704)
- May 17 – Hector d'Andigné de Grandfontaine, Governor of Acadia from 1670 to 1673 (d. 1696)
- May 29
  - Anne, Duchess of Montpensier, French princess and duchess (d. 1693)
  - Nikolaj Nissen, Danish judge (d. 1684)
- June 4 – Eiler Holck, Danish military officer (d. 1696)
- June 14 – Johann Abraham Ihle, German amateur astronomer (d. 1699)
- June 19 – Thomas Richardson, 2nd Lord Cramond, English Member of Parliament (d. 1674)

=== July–September ===
- July 1 – Anna Maria of Mecklenburg-Schwerin, consort of Augustus, Duke of Saxe-Weissenfels (d. 1669)
- July 3 – Juan Ortega y Montañés, Spanish Catholic bishop, colonial administrator in Guatemala and New Spain (d. 1708)
- July 18 – Henry Howard, 5th Earl of Suffolk, youngest son of Theophilus Howard (d. 1709)
- July 20 – Thomas Wynne, English personal physician of William Penn (d. 1691)
- July 28 – John Francis Desideratus, Prince of Nassau-Siegen (1652–1699) (d. 1699)
- August 1 – Princess Louise of Savoy, Hereditary Princess of Baden-Baden (d. 1689)
- August 2 – Samuel Dirksz van Hoogstraten, Dutch painter of the Golden Age (d. 1678)
- August 8
  - Bartolomé Garcia de Escañuela, Spanish Catholic prelate, Bishop of Durango (1676–1684), Bishop of Puerto Rico (1670–1676) (d. 1684)
  - Joseph Moxon, English printer (d. 1691)
- August 21
  - Louis Cousin, French translator (d. 1707)
  - August of Legnica, Silesian nobleman (d. 1679)
- August 26 – Philipp Jakob Sachs, German physician (d. 1672)
- August 30
  - Margaretha van Godewijk, Dutch Golden Age poet and painter (d. 1677)
  - Itō Jinsai, Japanese philosopher (d. 1705)
- September 11 – John Ernest II, Duke of Saxe-Weimar (1662–1683) (d. 1683)
- September 12 – Humbertus Guilielmus de Precipiano, Belgian Catholic archbishop (d. 1711)
- September 27 – Jacques-Bénigne Bossuet, French bishop and theologian (d. 1704)

=== October–December ===
- October 1 – Galeazzo Marescotti, Italian Catholic cardinal (d. 1726)
- October 3 – William Crispin, one of five English Commissioners appointed by William Penn for settling Pennsylvania (d. 1681)
- October 4
  - Sir John Fagg, 1st Baronet, English politician (d. 1701)
  - Francisco Varo, Spanish linguist (d. 1687)
- November 5 – Herman Egon, Prince of Fürstenberg, High Chamberlain of the Elector of Bavaria (d. 1674)
- November 12 – Diego Luis de San Vitores, Spanish Jesuit missionary to Guam (d. 1672)
- November 14 – Marie Jonas de la Motte, Dutch prostitute (d. 1683)
- November 16 – Erasmus Finx, German polymath (d. 1694)
- November 17 – John George II, Prince of Anhalt-Dessau (1660–1693) (d. 1693)
- November 20 – Charlotte, Landgravine of Hesse-Kassel, German noble (d. 1686)
- November 24 – Theophil Großgebauer, German theologian (d. 1661)
- November 29 – John Ray, English biologist (d. 1705)
- December 3 – St John Brodrick, Irish Member of Parliament (d. 1711)
- December 7 – Countess Louise Henriette of Nassau, Electress Consort of Brandenburg (1646–1667) (d. 1667)
- December 10 – Jean Baptiste de Champaigne, Flemish painter (d. 1681)
- December 24 – Daniel Pawłowski, Polish writer (d. 1673)
- December 28 – Alessandro Rosi, Italian artist (d. 1697)

=== Date unknown ===
- Maria Sofia De la Gardie, Swedish countess and industrialist (d. 1694)
- Sir John Flavel, English dissenter and writer (d. 1691)
- Philip Fruytiers, Flemish painter (d. 1666)
- Turhan Hatice, regent of the Ottoman Empire (d. 1683)

=== Approximate date ===
- Ariana Nozeman, Dutch actress (d. 1661)

1628

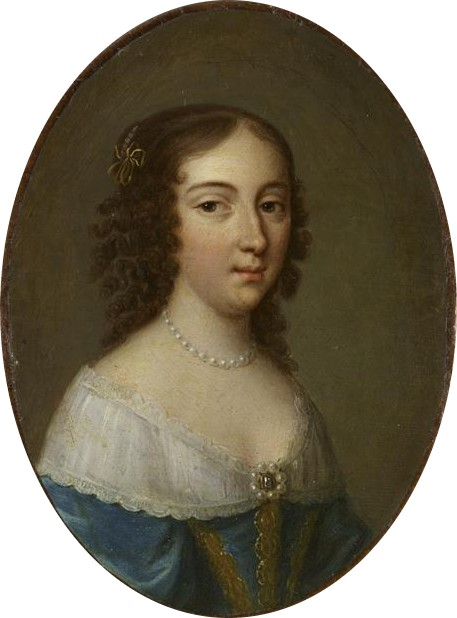
Claire-Clémence de Maillé-Brézé

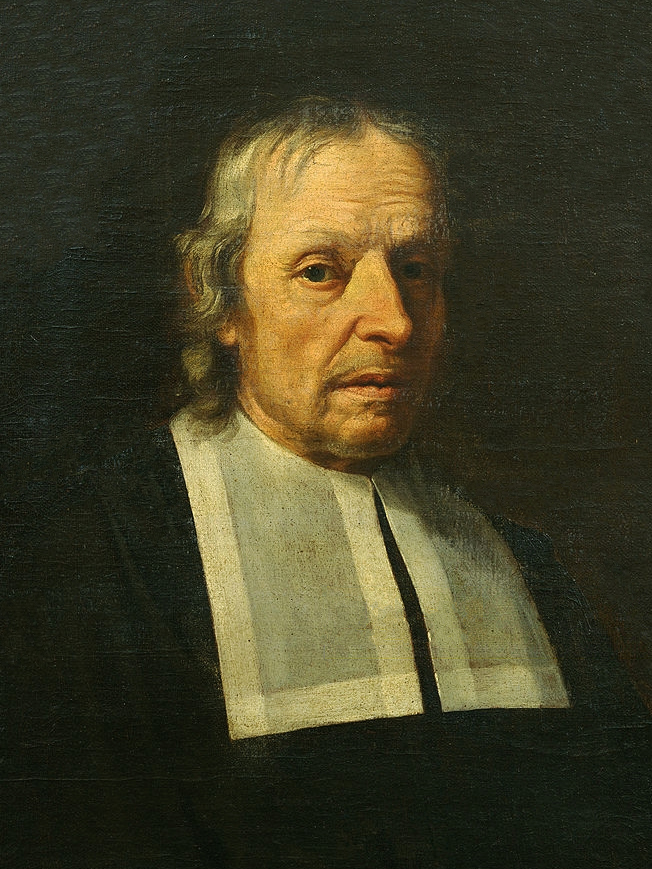
Marcello Malpighi

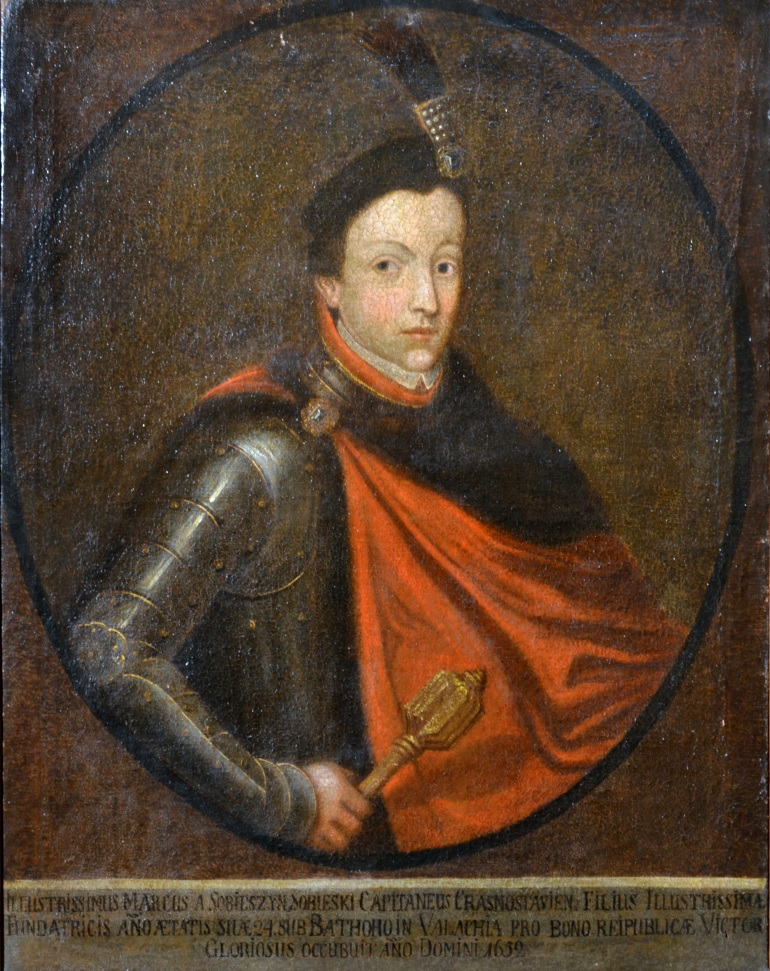
Marek Sobieski

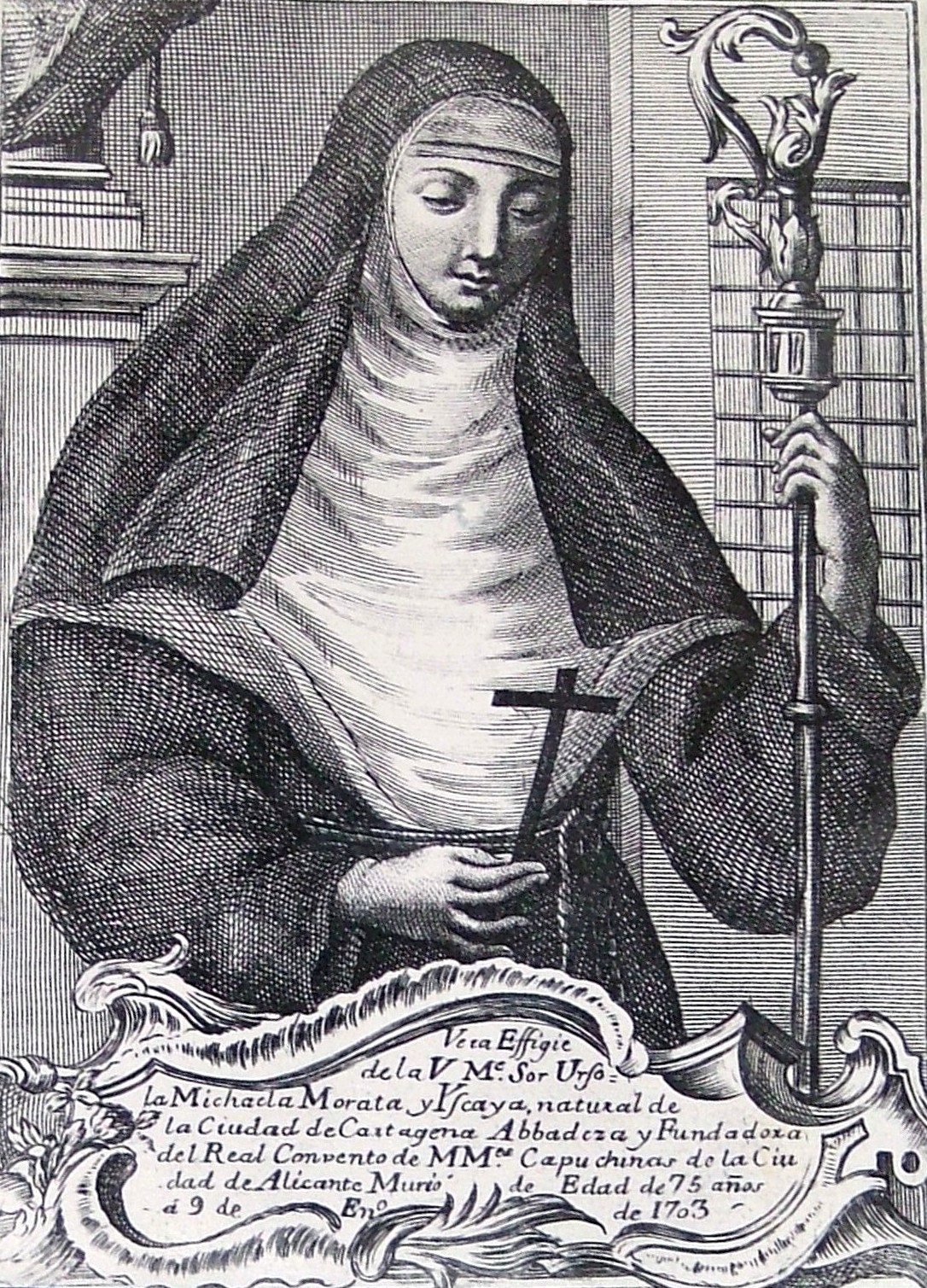
Úrsula Micaela Morata

=== January–March ===
- January 1 – Christoph Bernhard, German composer (d. 1692)
- January 3 – Alvise II Mocenigo, Doge of Venice (d. 1709)
- January 8 – François-Henri de Montmorency, duc de Luxembourg, French general (d. 1695)
- January 10
  - John Bennet, English landowner and politician (d. 1663)
  - Jan Theunisz Blanckerhoff, Dutch Golden Age marine painter (d. 1669)
- January 12 – Charles Perrault, French folklorist (d. 1703)
- January 14 – Sir Roger Bradshaigh, 1st Baronet, English politician (d. 1684)
- January 19 – Charles Stanley, 8th Earl of Derby, English noble (d. 1672)
- January 20 – Henry Cromwell, 4th son of Oliver Cromwell and Elizabeth Bourchier (d. 1674)
- January 23 – Johann Reinhard II, Count of Hanau-Lichtenberg, German aristocrat (d. 1666)
- January 30 – George Villiers, 2nd Duke of Buckingham, English statesman (d. 1687)
- February 1 – Jan Hackaert, Dutch painter (d. 1685)
- February 5 – César d'Estrées, French Catholic cardinal (d. 1714)
- February 14 – Valentine Greatrakes, Irish faith healer (d. 1682)
- February 24 – Paolo Spinola, 3rd Marquis of the Balbases and 3rd Duke of San Severino and Sesto (d. 1699)
- February 25 – Claire-Clémence de Maillé-Brézé, French noblewoman (d. 1694)
- March 2 – Cornelis Speelman, Governor-General of the Dutch East Indies (d. 1684)
- March 10
  - Marcello Malpighi, Italian biologist and physician (d. 1694)
  - François Girardon, French sculptor (d. 1715)
- March 12 – Jacques Frémin, French Jesuit missionary to Canada (d. 1691)
- March 17 – Daniel Papebroch, Flemish Jesuit hagiographer (d. 1714)
- March 20 – Sir John Hobart, 3rd Baronet, English landowner and politician (d. 1683)
- March 24 – Sophie Amalie of Brunswick-Lüneburg (d. 1685)

=== April–June ===
- April 2 – Constantin Christian Dedekind, German poet, dramatist and composer (d. 1715)
- April 16 – Cornelis Evertsen the Younger, Dutch admiral (d. 1679)
- April 22 – Georg Matthäus Vischer, Austrian cartographer (d. 1696)
- April 23
  - Johann van Waveren Hudde, Dutch mathematician (d. 1704)
  - Johannes Hudde, burgomaster (mayor) of Amsterdam (d. 1704)
- April 24 – William Beecher, English politician (d. 1694)
- April 25 – Sir William Temple, 1st Baronet, English statesman and essayist (d. 1699)
- May 7 – Étienne Le Hongre, French sculptor (d. 1690)
- May 8 – Angelo Italia, Sicilian Jesuit architect (d. 1700)
- May 9 – Sir William Gardiner, 1st Baronet, English Member of Parliament (d. 1691)
- May 15
  - Dominique Bouhours, French Jesuit priest (d. 1702)
  - Carlo Cignani, Italian painter of the Bolognese and the Forlivese school (d. 1719)
- May 17 – Ferdinand Charles, Archduke of Austria (d. 1662)
- May 24 – Marek Sobieski, Polish noble (szlachcic) (d. 1652)
- June 1 – John Dugdale, English herald in the College of Arms (d. 1700)
- June 4 – Christopher Delphicus zu Dohna, Swedish diplomat (d. 1668)
- June 5 – Arthur Sparke, English lawyer and politician (d. 1677)
- June 15 – Walter Marshall, British theologian (d. 1680)
- June 21 – Alexander Parker, English Quaker preacher and author (d. 1689)
- June 30 – Miguel de Molinos, Spanish mystic (d. 1696)

=== July–September ===
- July 11 – Tokugawa Mitsukuni, Japanese warlord (d. 1701)
- July 12 – Henry Howard, 6th Duke of Norfolk (d. 1684)
- July 17 – Richard Powle, English politician (d. 1678)
- August 12 – Gabriel Gerberon, French Jansenist monk (d. 1711)
- August 20 – Emmanuel Philibert, Prince of Carignano, Prince of Savoy (d. 1709)
- August 29
  - Jan Pieter Brueghel, Flemish Baroque painter (d. 1664)
  - John Granville, 1st Earl of Bath, English royalist statesman (d. 1701)
- September 7 – Sir William Courtenay, 1st Baronet, English politician (d. 1702)
- September 21 – Barend Graat, Dutch painter (d. 1709)
- September 23 – David Klöcker Ehrenstrahl, German artist (d. 1698)

=== October–December ===
- October 12
  - Hermann of Baden-Baden, Imperial field marshal and president of the Hofkriegsrat (d. 1691)
  - William Christopher of Baden-Baden, margrave of Baden and canon at Cologne (d. 1652)
- October 21 – Úrsula Micaela Morata, Spanish writer (d. 1703)
- October 23 – Henry Eyre, English politician and lawyer (d. 1678)
- October 24 – Lucrezia Barberini, Italian noblewoman (d. 1699)
- November 30 (baptised) – John Bunyan, English writer best known for The Pilgrim's Progress (d. 1688)
- December 2 – Johannes Rothe, Dutch preacher (d. 1702)
- December 10 – Jan Baptist Martin Wans, Flemish painter (d. 1684)
- December 12 – Anna Salome of Manderscheid-Blankenheim, German abbess of Thorn Abbey, later abbess of Essen Abbey (d. 1691)
- December 19 – Charlotte of the Palatinate, German noble (d. 1631)
- December 21 – Samuel Capricornus, Czech composer (d. 1665)
- December 25 – Noël Coypel, French painter (d. 1707)
- December 26 – John Page, American politician (d. 1692)

=== Probable ===
- Josias Fendall, Colonial governor of Maryland (d. 1687)
- Anne Greene, English domestic servant and execution survivor (d. 1659)
- Jacob Isaacksz van Ruisdael, Dutch landscape painter (d. 1682)

1629

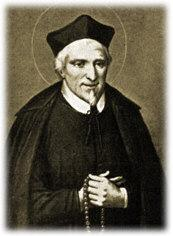
Sebastian Valfrè

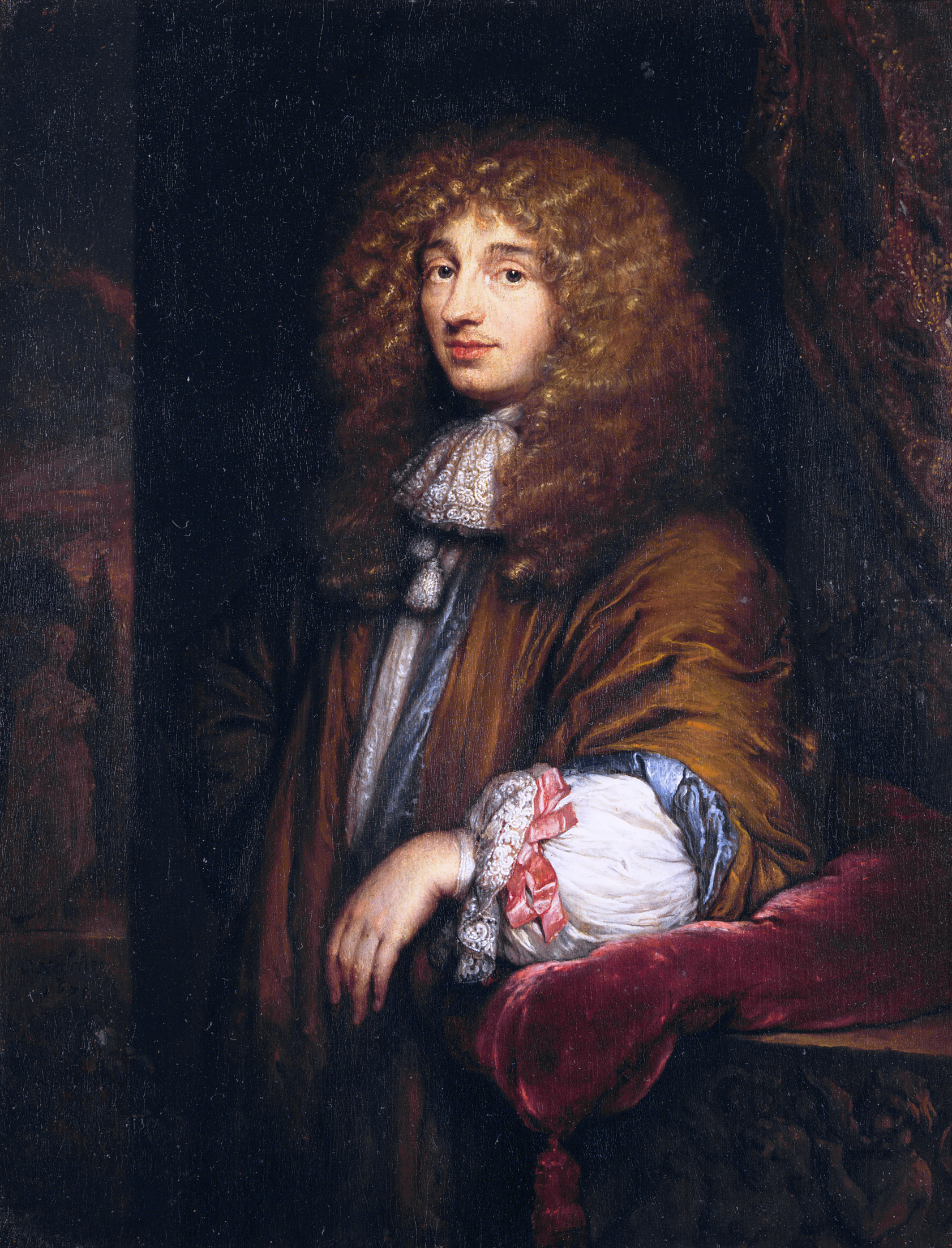
Christiaan Huygens

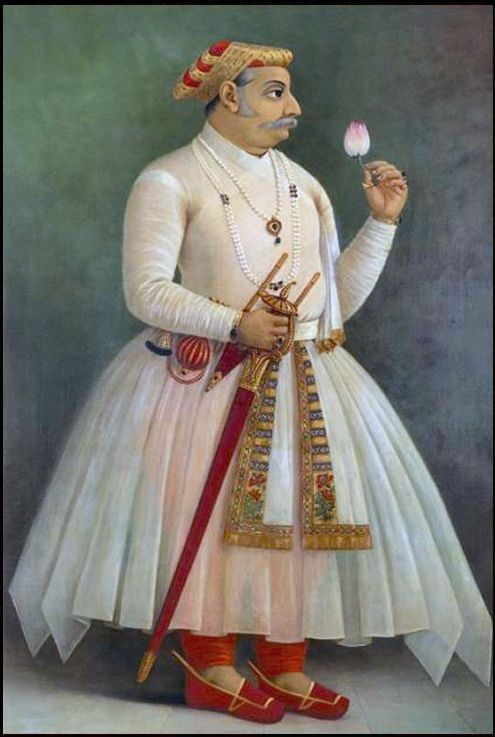
Raj Singh I

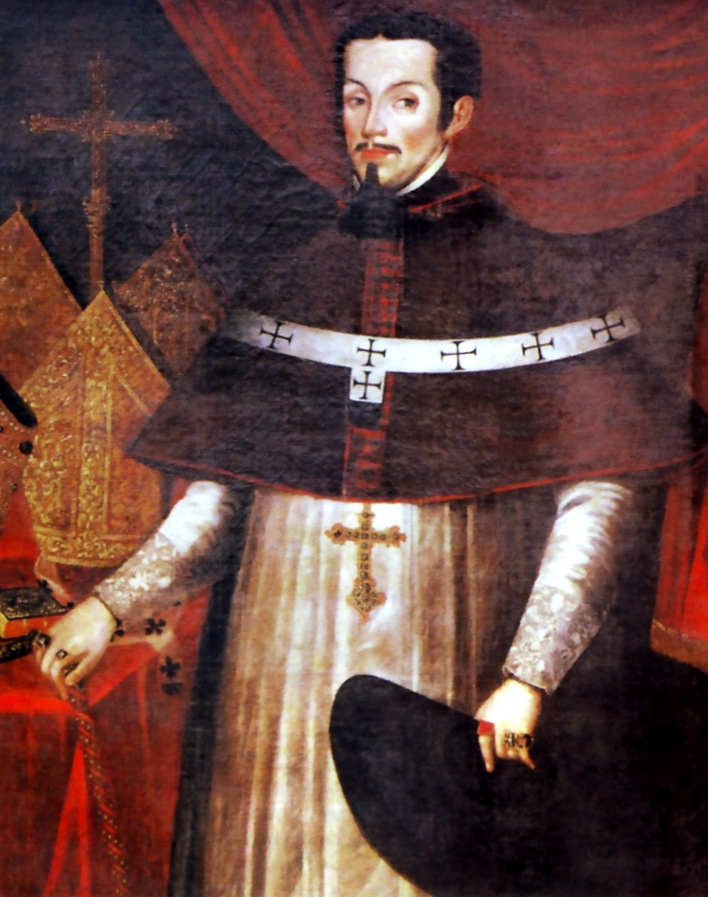
Melchor Liñán y Cisneros

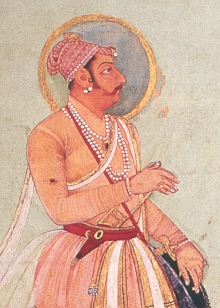
Jaswant Singh of Marwar

=== January–March ===
- January 2 – Christian Scriver, German hymnwriter (d. 1693)
- January 8 – Sir William Hickman, 2nd Baronet, Member of the House of Commons of England (d. 1682)
- January 13 – Lelio Colista, Italian composer and lutenist (d. 1680)
- January 16 – Theodorick Bland of Westover, American politician (d. 1671)
- January 23 – Adolph, Prince of Nassau-Schaumburg and Count of Nassau-Schaumburg (1653–1676) (d. 1676)
- February 5 – Henry Muddiman, English journalist and publisher (d. 1692)
- February 16 – Gert Miltzow, Norwegian clergyman and historical writer (d. 1688)
- February 25 – Francis Erdmann, Duke of Saxe-Lauenburg, Germany (d. 1666)
- February 26
  - Archibald Campbell, 9th Earl of Argyll, Scottish peer (d. 1685)
  - Iver Leganger, Norwegian priest, non-fiction writer (d. 1702)
- March 1 – Abraham Teniers, Flemish painter (d. 1670)
- March 5 – Philip Howard, English politician (d. 1711)
- March 8 – Johannes Caioni, Transylvanian Franciscan friar (d. 1687)
- March 9 – Sebastian Valfrè, Italian Oratorian priest (d. 1710)
- March 10 – Metcalfe Robinson, English politician (d. 1689)
- March 29 – Tsar Alexis of Russia (d. 1676)

=== April–June ===
- April 1 – Jean-Henri d'Anglebert, French harpsichordist and composer (d. 1691)
- April 7 – John Joseph of Austria, Spanish general (d. 1679)
- April 14 – Christiaan Huygens, Dutch scientist (d. 1695)
- April 23 – Jan Commelin, Dutch botanist (d. 1692)
- May 8 – Niels Juel, Danish admiral (d. 1697)
- May 23 – William VI, Landgrave of Hesse-Kassel (1637–1663) (d. 1663)
- June 5 – George Mason I, American politician (d. 1686)

=== July–September ===
- July 2 – Elizabeth Claypole, daughter of Oliver Cromwell (d. 1658)
- July 26 – John Ferrers, English politician (d. 1680)
- July 27 – Princess Luisa Cristina of Savoy, Princess of Savoy (d. 1692)
- August 6 – Thomas Walcot, British judge (d. 1685)
- August 10 – Agostino Scilla, Italian painter and scientist (d. 1700)
- August 12 – Archduchess Isabella Clara of Austria, Austrian archduchess (d. 1685)
- August 17 – King John III Sobieski, of Poland (d. 1696)
- August 18 – Agneta Horn, Swedish writer (d. 1672)
- August 20 – Matthew Wren, English politician (d. 1672)
- August 31 – Anna Margaret of Hesse-Homburg, Duchess consort of Schleswig-Holstein-Sonderburg-Wiesenburg (d. 1686)
- September 1 – Dorothea Elisabeth Christiansdatter, daughter of king Christian IV of Denmark (d. 1687)
- September 3
  - Lady Mary Dering, English composer (d. 1704)
  - Cornelis Tromp, Dutch naval officer (d. 1691)
- September 4 – Lorenzo Pasinelli, Italian painter (d. 1700)
- September 10 – John Heydon, English Neoplatonist occult philosopher (d. 1667)
- September 17 – Sir John Perceval, 1st Baronet, Anglo-Irish nobleman (d. 1665)
- September 21 – Philip Howard, English Roman Catholic Cardinal (d. 1694)
- September 24 – Raj Singh I, Maharaja of Mewar (d. 1680)

=== October–December ===
- October 3
  - Charles II, Duke of Mantua and Montferrat, son of Charles of Gonzaga-Nevers of Rethel (d. 1665)
  - Armand Jean de Vignerot du Plessis, French duke (d. 1715)
- October 7 – George Ernest, Count of Erbach-Wildenstein, Count of Erbach and Wildenstein (1647–1669) (d. 1669)
- October 10 – Richard Towneley, English mathematician and astronomer from Towneley near Burnley (d. 1707)
- October 11 – Armand de Bourbon, Prince of Conti, Frondeur (d. 1666)
- October 17 – Balthasar Charles, Prince of Asturias (d. 1646)
- October 18 – Lodewijk Meyer, Dutch physician and scholar (d. 1681)
- October 21 – Adolph John I, Count Palatine of Kleeburg, Swedish prince (d. 1689)
- October 28 – Maria van Riebeeck, South African settler (d. 1664)
- October 29 – Agnes Block, Dutch horticulturalist (d. 1704)
- November 1 – Oliver Plunkett, Irish saint (d. 1681)
- November 11 – Lodewijck van Ludick, painter from the Northern Netherlands (d. 1724)
- November 20 – Ernest Augustus, Elector of Brunswick-Lüneburg (d. 1698)
- December 2 – Wilhelm Egon von Fürstenberg, German Catholic cardinal (d. 1704)
- December 7 – Ezekiel, Freiherr von Spanheim, Swiss diplomat (d. 1710)
- December 11 – Sir Baynham Throckmorton, 3rd Baronet, English Member of Parliament (d. 1681)
- December 12 – Symeon of Polotsk, Belarusian churchman and poet (d. 1680)
- December 16 – Ahasverus Fritsch, German jurist, poet and hymn writer (d. 1701)
- December 19 – Melchor Liñán y Cisneros, Spanish Catholic archbishop (d. 1708)
- December 20 – Pieter de Hooch, Dutch painter (d. 1684)
- December 23 – Paul Rycaut, British diplomat (d. 1700)
- December 26 – Jaswant Singh of Marwar, ruler of Marwar in the present-day Indian state of Rajasthan (d. 1678)

=== Date unknown ===
- Katherine Austen, English diarist and poet (d. c. 1683)
- Ruaidhrí Ó Flaithbheartaigh (Roderick O'Flaherty), Irish chieftain and historian (d. 1718)

== Deaths ==
1620

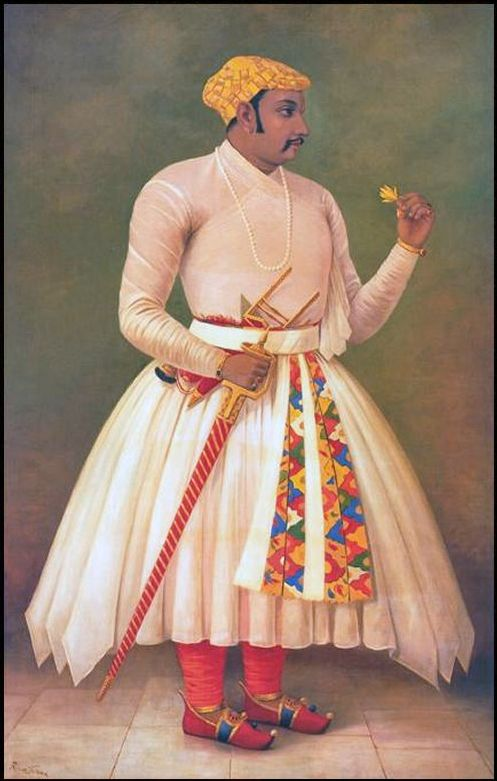
Amar Singh I

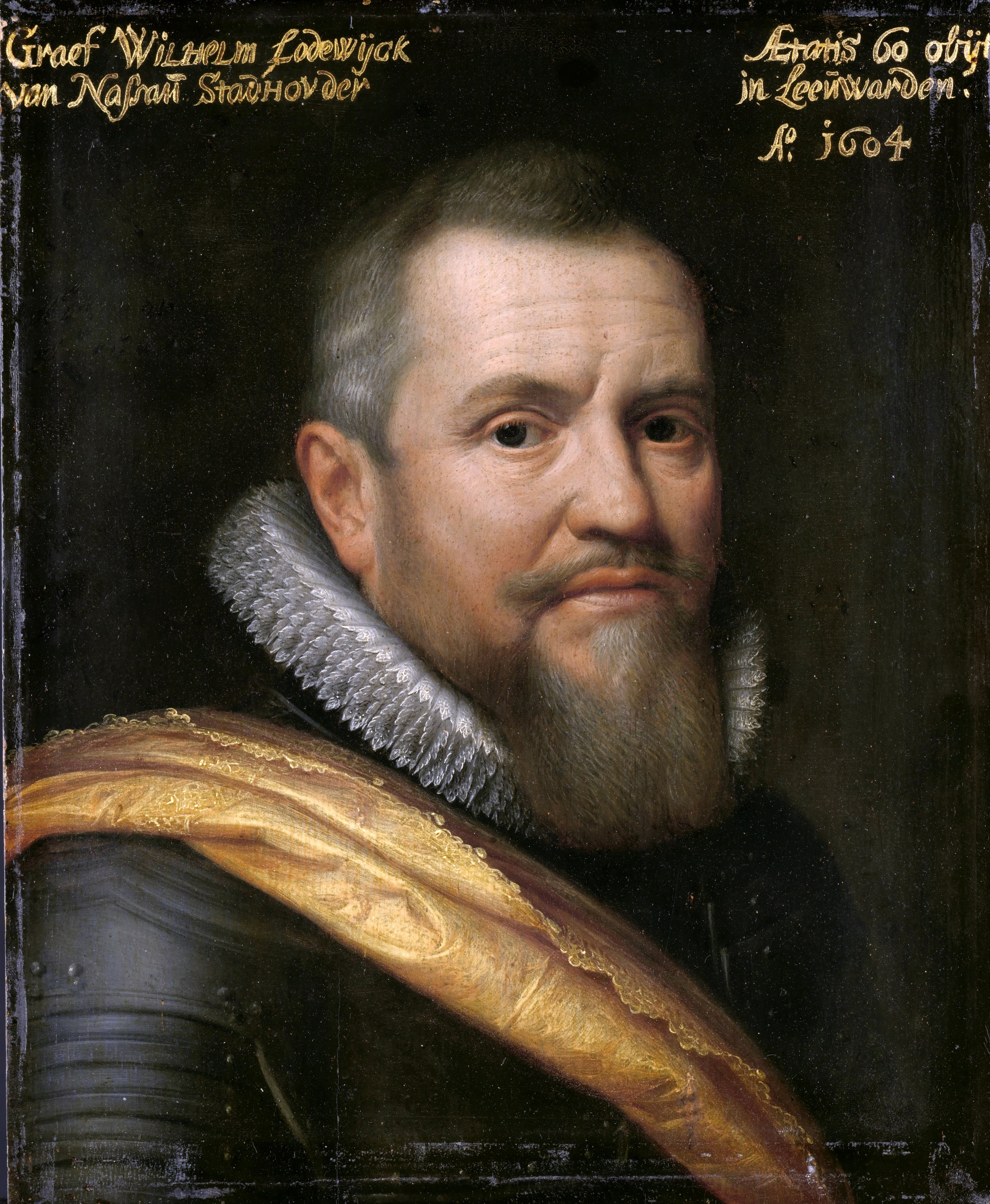
William Louis, Count of Nassau-Dillenburg

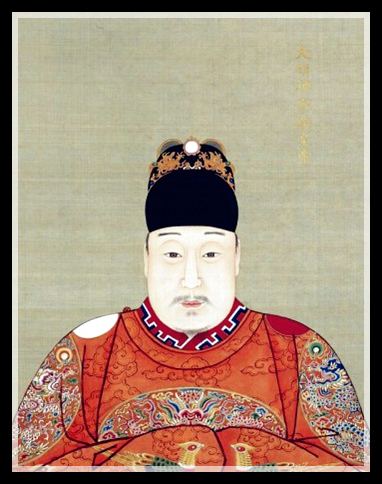
Wanli Emperor

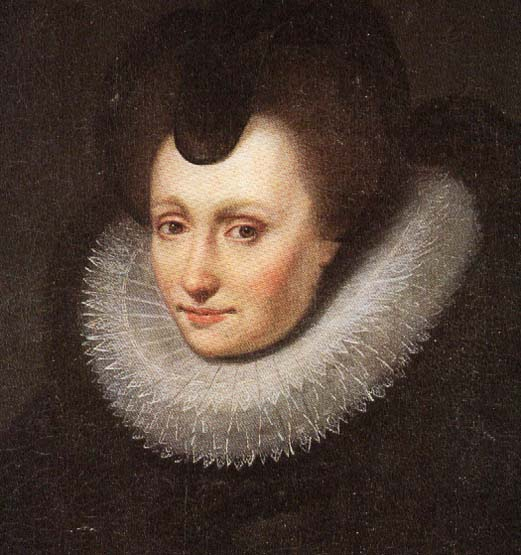
Louise de Coligny

=== January–March ===
- January 20 – John Croke, English politician and judge (b. 1553)
- January 26 – Amar Singh I, ruler of Mewar (b. 1559)
- January 28 – Archduchess Eleanor of Austria (b. 1582)
- February 15 – James Archer, Irish Jesuit; played a controversial role in the Nine Years' War (b. 1550)
- February 19
  - Al-Mansur al-Qasim, Imam of Yemen (b. 1559)
  - Roemer Visscher, Dutch writer (b. 1547)
- February 23 – Nicholas Fuller, English politician (b. 1543)
- March 1 – Thomas Campion, English poet and composer (b. 1567)
- March 5 – Giovanni Francesco Sagredo, Italian mathematician (b. 1571)
- March 17 – St. John Sarkander, Moravian priest (injuries caused by torturing) (b. 1576)
- March 25 – Johannes Nucius, German composer (b. c. 1556)
- March 29 – Hachisuka Yoshishige, Japanese daimyō of the Edo period (b. 1586)

=== April–June ===
- April 8 – Angelo Rocca, Italian humanist (b. 1545)
- April 23 – Hayyim ben Joseph Vital, Palestinian-born Kabbalist (b. 1543)
- April 14 – Rascas de Bagarris, French scholar (b. 1562)
- May 16 – William Adams, English navigator and samurai (b. 1564)
- May 30 – Mathias Hovius, Roman Catholic archbishop (b. 1542)
- June 17 – Mikołaj Zebrzydowski (b. 1553)

=== July–September ===
- July 13 – William Louis, Count of Nassau-Dillenburg (b. 1560)
- August 2 – Carolus Luython, Belgian composer (b. 1557)
- August 14 – Katherine Hastings, Countess of Huntingdon, wife of Henry Hastings, 3rd Earl of Huntingdon (b. 1540)
- August 18 – Wanli Emperor, of China (b. 1563)
- September 13 – Wolfgang Hirschbach, German legal scholar (b. 1570)
- September 26 – Taichang Emperor, fourteenth emperor of the Ming dynasty of China (b. 1582)
- September – Sidonia von Borcke, German noble and alleged witch (b. 1548)

=== October–December ===
- October 7 – Stanisław Żółkiewski, Polish nobleman of the Lubicz coat of arms (b. 1547)
- November 6 – Philip III, Margrave of Baden-Rodemachern (1588–1620) (b. 1567)
  - William Butten, Mayflower passenger (b. unknown)
- November 7 – Robert Hesketh, English politician (b. 1560)
- November 9 – Louise de Coligny, daughter of Gaspard II de Coligny; fourth and last spouse of William the Silent (b. 1555)
- November 11 – Isaac and Josias Habrecht, Swiss watchmaking brothers (b. 1544)
- November 27 – Francis, Duke of Pomerania-Stettin, Bishop of Cammin (b. 1577)
- December 3 – Janusz Radziwiłł, Polish noble (b. 1579)
- December 21 – George Fleetwood, English politician (b. 1564)

=== Date unknown ===
- Rose of Turaida, legendary Latvian murder victim (b. 1601)
- John Flower, English politician (b. 1535)

=== Approximate date ===
- Brianda Pereira, Azorean Portuguese heroine (b. 1550)
- Isabella Parasole, Italian engraver (b. ca. 1570)

1621

=== January–March ===
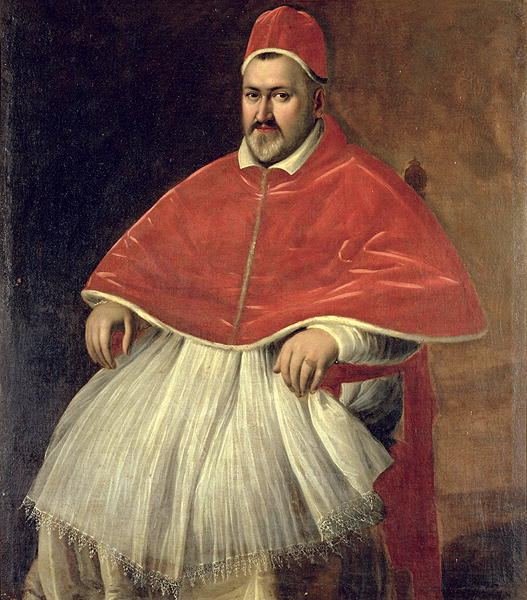
Pope Paul V

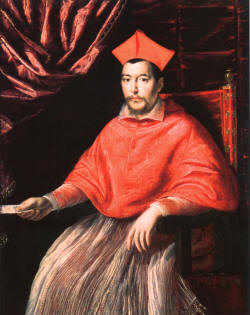
Pietro Aldobrandini

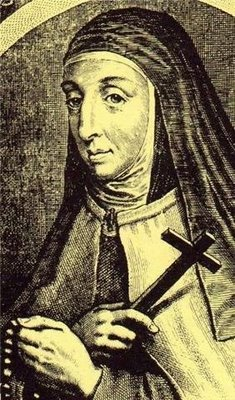
Servant of God Ana de Jesús

- January 15 – Christopher Pickering, British politician (b. 1556)
- January 28 – Pope Paul V (b. 1552)
- January 29 – Francis Taylor, Mayor of Dublin, Ireland (b. c. 1550)
- February 10 – Pietro Aldobrandini, Italian cardinal, patron of the arts (b. 1571)
- February 15 – Michael Praetorius, German composer (b. 1571)
- February 16 – Sir Thomas Gerard, 1st Baronet, English Member of Parliament (b. 1560)
- February 28 – Cosimo II de' Medici, Grand Duke of Tuscany (b. 1590)
- March 4 – Ana de Jesús, Spanish Discalced Carmelite nun, spiritual writer and Servant of God (b. 1545)
- March 8 – Enevold Kruse, Danish noble (b. 1554)
- March 27 – Benedetto Giustiniani, Italian Catholic cardinal (b. 1554)
- March 28 – Ottavio Rinuccini, Italian composer (b. 1562)
- March 31 – King Philip III of Spain, (Philip II of Portugal) (b. 1578)

=== April–June ===
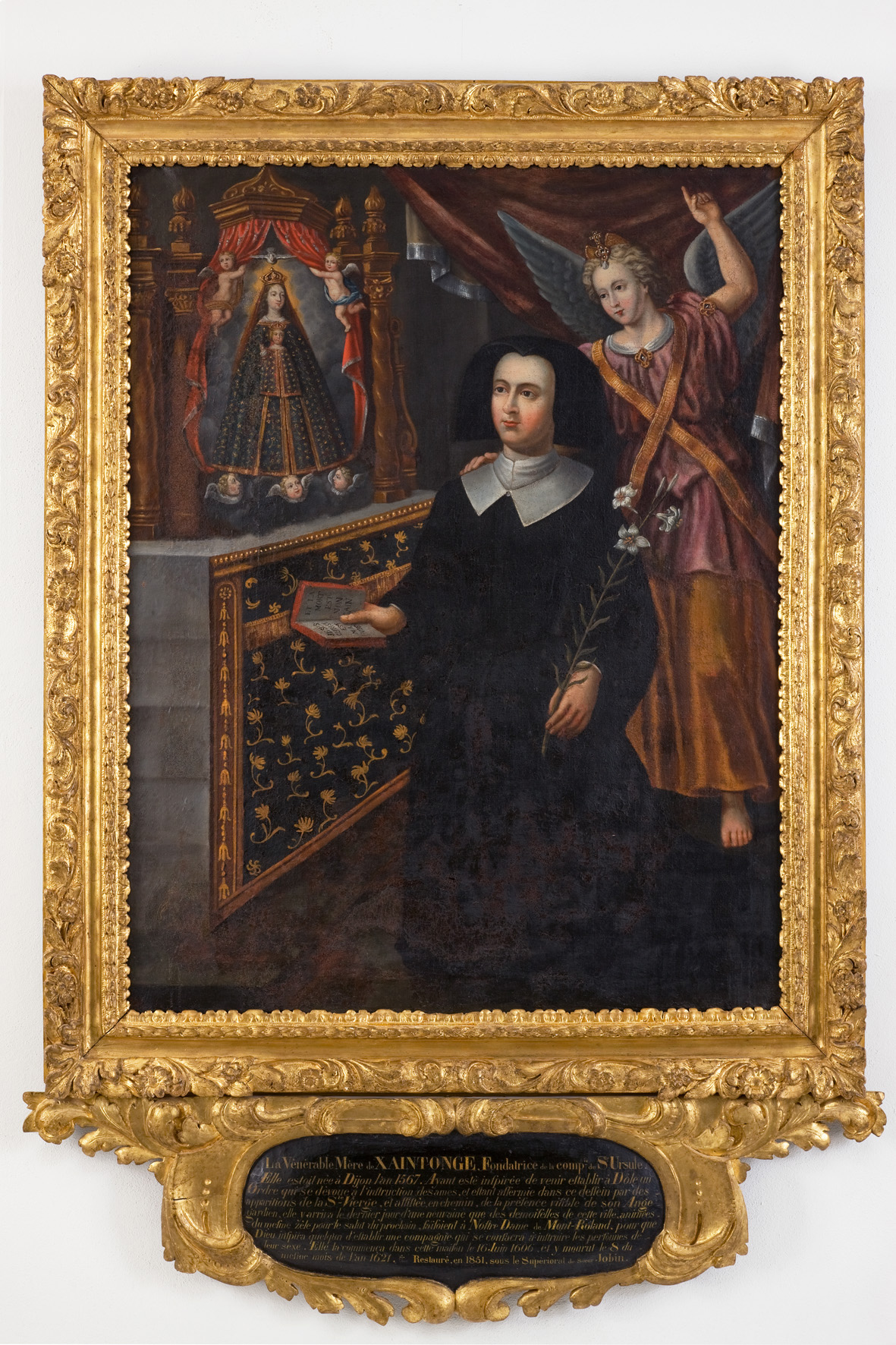
Venerable Anne de Xainctonge

- April 1 – Cristofano Allori, Italian painter (b. 1577)
- April 6
  - Archduchess Maria Christina of Austria (b. 1574)
  - Edward Seymour, 1st Earl of Hertford (b. 1539)
- April 18 – Bridget Chaworth, English noble (b. 1542)
- April 21 – Anne of Ostfriesland, German noblewoman (b. 1562)
- April – John Carver, first governor of Plymouth Colony
- May 3 – Elizabeth Bacon, English Tudor gentlewoman (b. 1541)
- May 11 – Johann Arndt, German theologian (b. 1555)
- May 15 – Hendrick de Keyser, Dutch architect and sculptor (b. 1565)
- June 2
  - Dorothea of Lorraine (b. 1545)
  - Eilhard Lubinus, German theologian (b. 1565)
- June 8 – Anne de Xainctonge, French Roman Catholic nun (b. 1567)
- June 21
  - Kryštof Harant z Polžic a Bezdružic, Bohemian composer, soldier and author (executed) (b. 1564)
  - Maxmilián Hošťálek, Czech noble and politician (executed) (b. 1564)
  - Joachim Andreas von Schlick, Czech leader (executed) (b. 1569)
  - Jan Jesenius, Slovak physician (executed) (b. 1566)
- June 23 – Zsigmond Forgách, Hungarian noble and soldier (b. 1559)
- June 26 – Christence Kruckow, Danish noble (b. 1558)

=== July–September ===
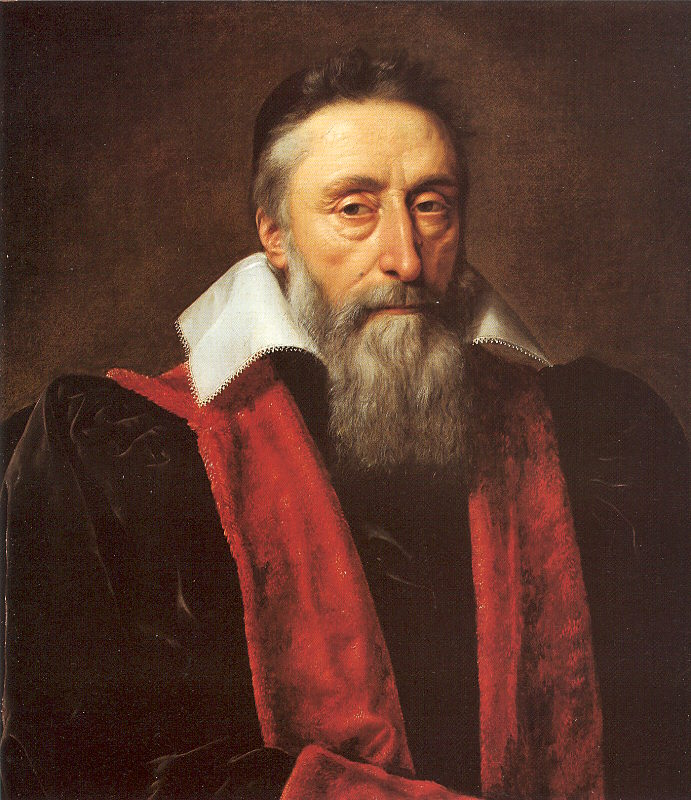
Guillaume du Vair

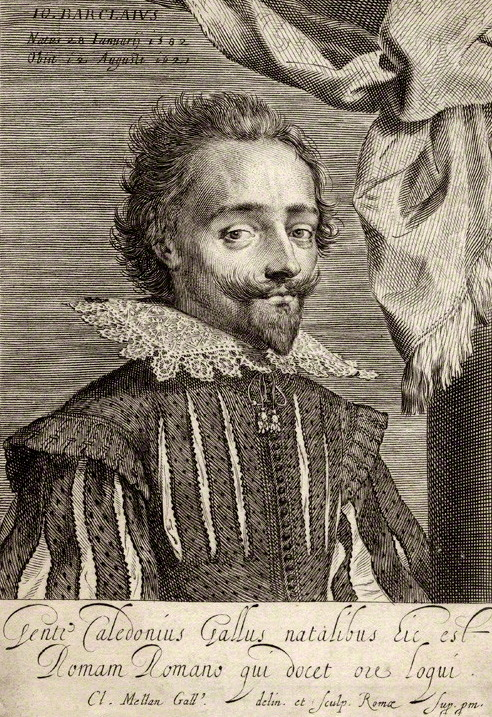
John Barclay

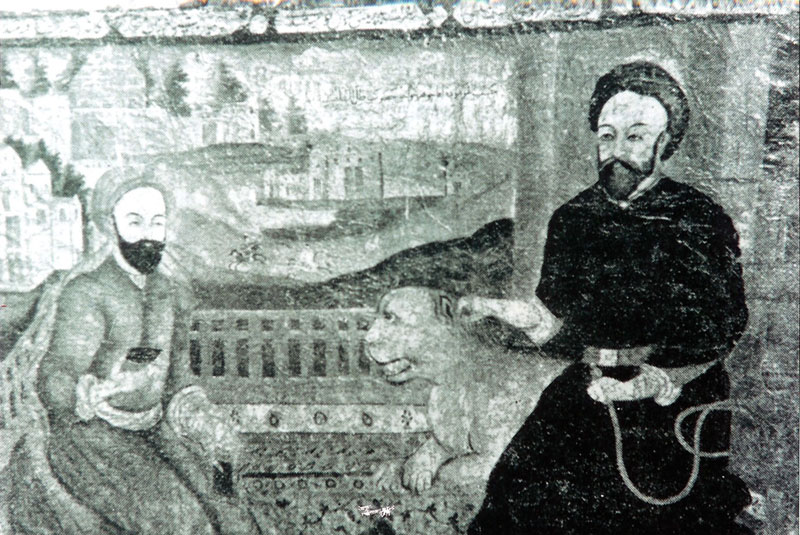
Bahāʾ al-dīn al-ʿĀmilī

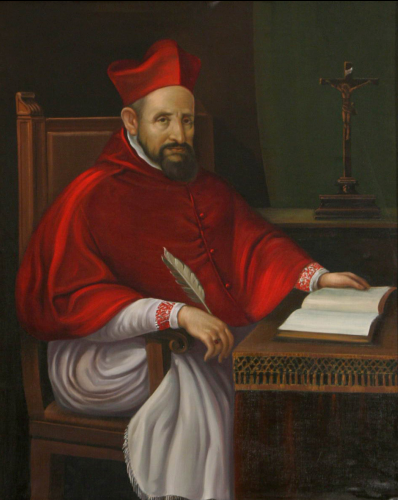
Saint Robert Bellarmine

- July 2 – Thomas Harriot, English astronomer and mathematician (b. c. 1560)
- July 4 – Jean de Bonsi, Catholic cardinal (b. 1554)
- July 10 – Charles Bonaventure de Longueval, Count of Bucquoy, soldier in Habsburg service (b. 1571)
- July 13 – Albert VII of Austria, Habsburg royal (b. 1559)
- July 19 – Don Giovanni de' Medici, Italian military commander and diplomat (b. 1567)
- July 30 – Rudolph, Prince of Anhalt-Zerbst (b. 1576)
- August 3
  - Guillaume du Vair, French author and lawyer (b. 1556)
  - Anna Juliana Gonzaga, Archduchess of Austria and nun (b. 1566)
- August 7 – Count Jobst of Limburg (b. 1560)
- August 13 – John Berchmans, Belgian Jesuit scholastic and saint (b. 1599)
- August 15 – John Barclay, Scottish writer (b. 1582)
- August 23 – Antonio il Verso, Italian composer (b. 1565)
- August 30 – Bahāʾ al-dīn al-ʿĀmilī, one of the main co-founders of Isfahan School of Islamic Philosophy (b. 1547)
- September 7 – Peter Warburton, English Justice of the Common Plea (b. 1540)
- September 17 – Robert Bellarmine, Italian Roman Catholic bishop, saint, proponent of futurism (b. 1542)
- September 20 – Henry of Lorraine, Duke of Mayenne, French noble (b. 1578)
- September 24 – Jan Karol Chodkiewicz, Polish military commander (b. 1560)
- September 25 – Mary Sidney, English writer, patroness and translator (b. 1561)

=== October–December ===
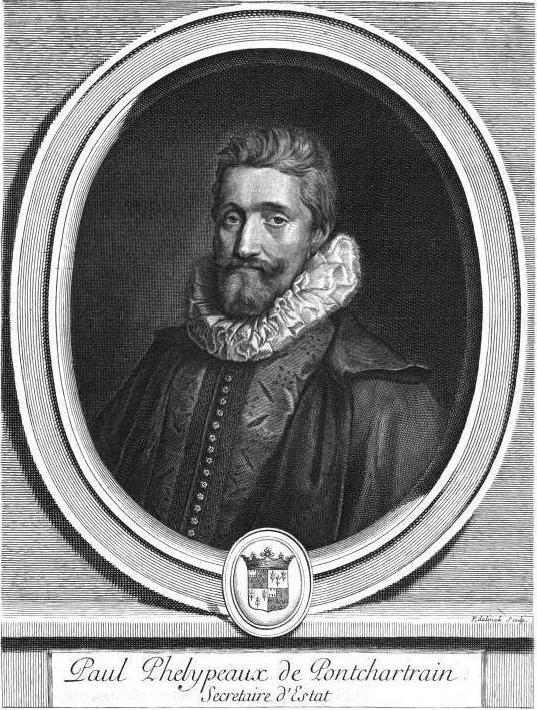
Paul Phélypeaux de Pontchartrain

- October 8 – Antoine de Montchrestien, French dramatist and economist (b. c. 1575)
- October 11 – Andrzej Sapieha, Polish nobleman (b. 1539)
- October 16 – Jan Pieterszoon Sweelinck, Dutch composer (b. 1562)
- October 19 – Imre Thurzó, Hungarian noble (b. 1598)
- October 21 – Paul Phélypeaux de Pontchartrain, French politician (b. 1569)
- November 26 – Ralph Agas, English surveyor (b. c. 1540)
- December 4 – Andrew Willet, English theologian (b. 1562)
- December 13 – Katarina Stenbock, queen of Gustav I of Sweden (b. 1535)
- December 15 – Charles d'Albert, duc de Luynes, Constable of France (b. 1578)

1622

=== January–March ===
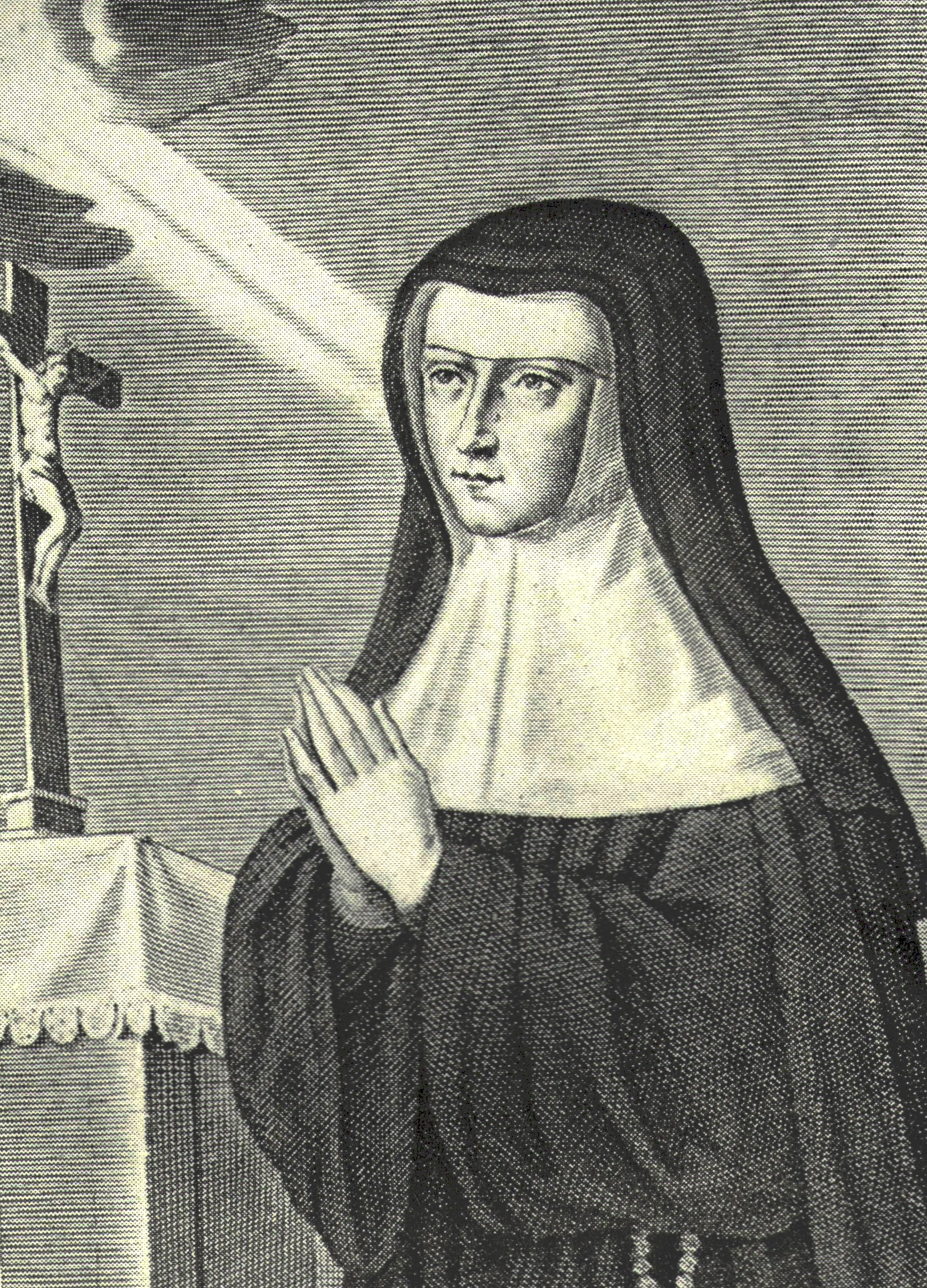
Alix Le Clerc

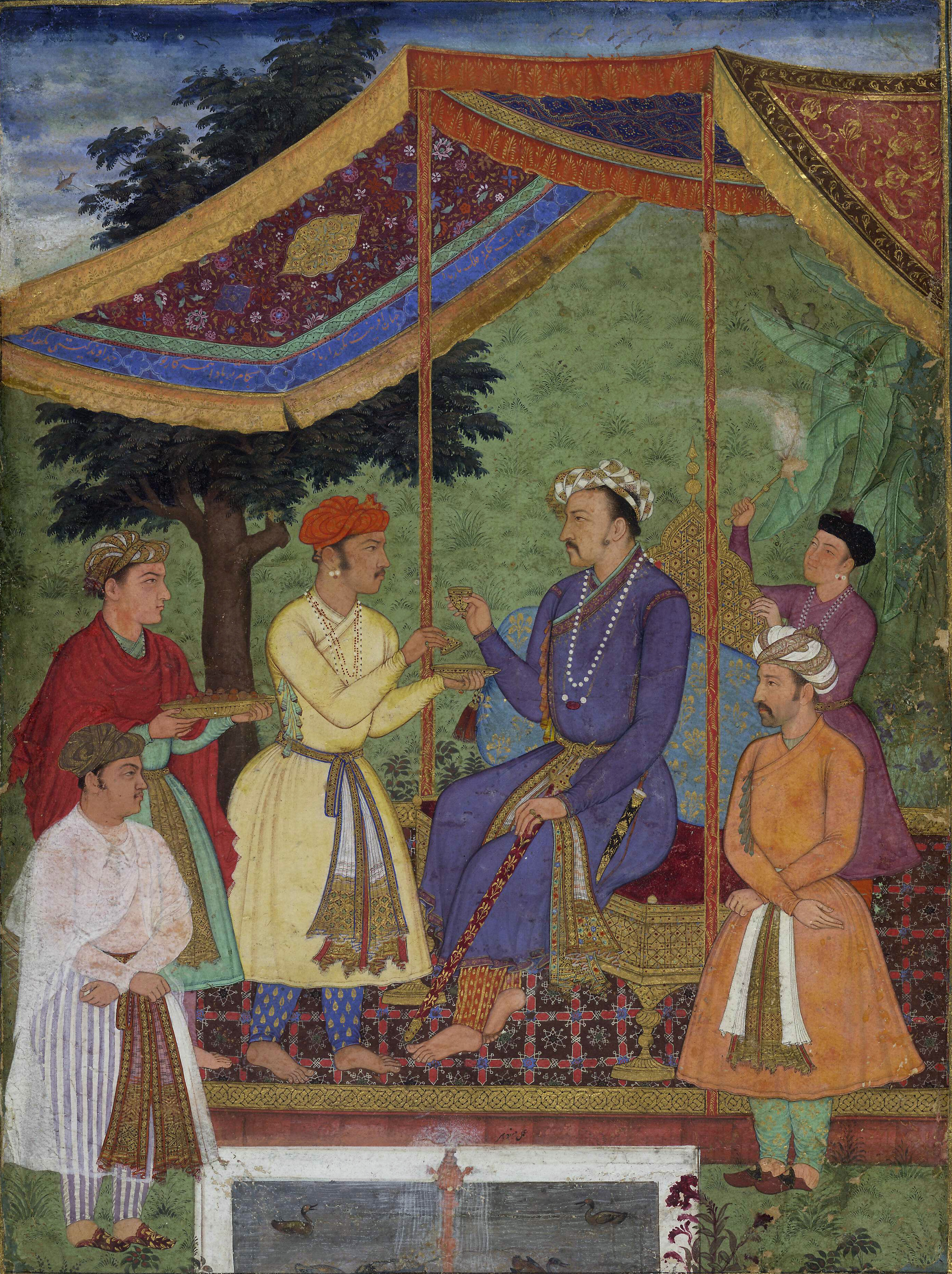
Khusrau Mirza

- January 1 – Jakob Hassler, German composer (b. 1569)
- January 9 – Alix Le Clerc, French Roman Catholic Canoness Regular, foundress and blessed (b. 1576)
- January 17 – Ernst of Schaumburg, Count of Holstein-Pinneberg and Schaumburg (1601–1622) (b. 1569)
- January 23 – William Baffin, English explorer (b. 1584)
- January 26 – Khusrau Mirza, Mughal prince (b. 1587)
- January 31 – Francis Norris, 1st Earl of Berkshire, English noble (b. 1579)
- February 11 – Alfonso Fontanelli, Italian composer (b. 1557)
- February 19
  - Sir Henry Savile, English educator (b. 1549)
  - Frans Pourbus the Younger, Flemish painter (b. 1569)
- February 20 – Juan de Valle y Arredondo, Spanish Catholic prelate, Bishop of Guadalajara (1607–1617) (b. 1567)
- March 5 – Ranuccio I Farnese, Duke of Parma (b. 1569)
- March 29 – Honda Yasutoshi, Japanese samurai (b. 1570)
- March 31 – Gonzalo Méndez de Canço, Royal Governor of La Florida (b. 1554)

=== April–June ===
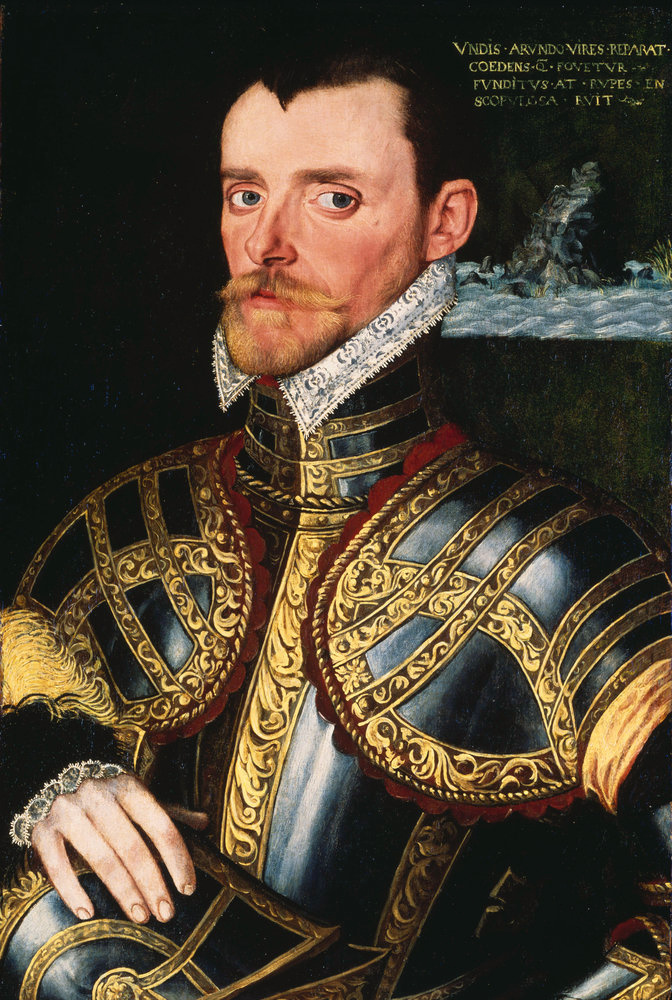
Richard Hawkins

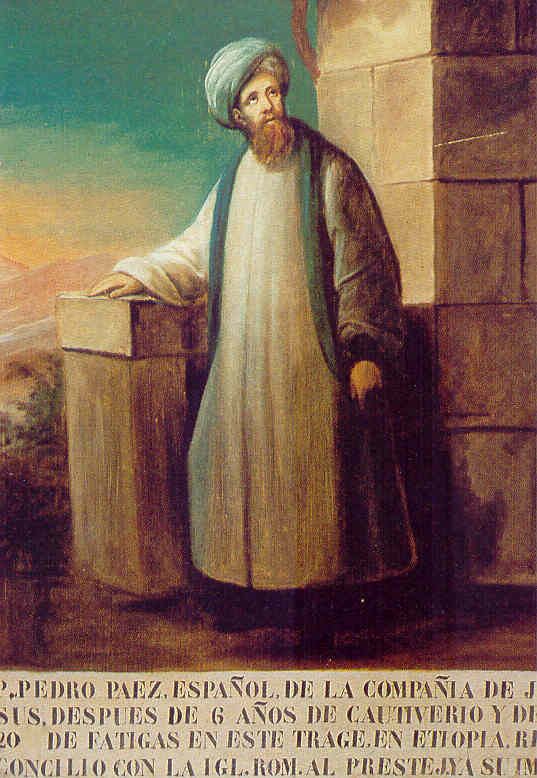
Pedro Páez

- April 5 – Vincenzo Filliucci, Italian Jesuit (b. 1566)
- April 13
  - Katharina Kepler, alleged German witch (b. 1546)
  - Johannetta of Sayn-Wittgenstein, German noblewoman (b. 1561)
- April 14 – Antoine de Gaudier, French Jesuit writer (b. 1572)
- April 15 – Leandro Bassano, Italian painter (b. 1557)
- April 17 – Richard Hawkins, 17th-century English seaman (b. c. 1562)
- April 24 – Fidelis of Sigmaringen, German Roman Catholic and Capuchin friar, missionary and saint (b. 1577)
- May 15 – Petrus Plancius, Dutch-Flemish astronomer and cartographer (b. 1552)
- May 20 – Osman II, Ottoman Sultan (b. 1604)
- May 22 – Juan Beltrán Guevara y Figueroa, Spanish Catholic prelate, Archbishop of Santiago de Compostela (1603–1614) (b. 1540)
- May 25 – Pedro Páez, Spanish Jesuit missionary in Ethiopia (b. 1564)
- June 4 – Péter Révay, Hungarian historian (b. 1568)
- June 15 – David Pareus, German theologian (b. 1548)
- June 21 – Salomon Schweigger, German theologian (b. 1551)

=== July–September ===
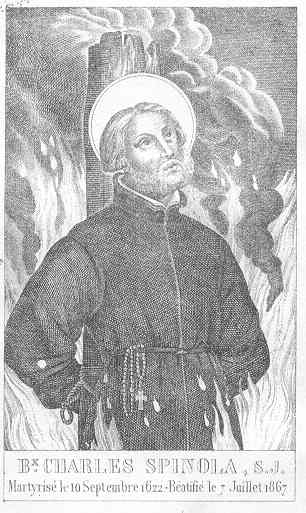
Charles Spinola

- July 1 – William Parker, 4th Baron Monteagle, British politician (b. 1575)
- August 7 – Anfiyanggū, Manchu official (b. 1559)
- August 10 – Giovanni Battista Viola, Italian painter (b. 1576)
- August 13 – Henri de Gondi, Catholic cardinal (b. 1572)
- August 29 – Duke Frederick of Saxe-Weimar, German prince and colonel on the Protestant side in the Thirty Years' War (b. 1596)
- September 7 – Denis Godefroy, French jurist (b. 1549)
- September 10 – Charles Spinola, Italian Jesuit missionary, martyr and blessed (b. 1564)
- September 14 – Alof de Wignacourt, French 54th Grandmaster of the Knights Hospitaller (b. 1547)
- September 29 – Conrad Vorstius, German-Dutch Remonstrant theologian (b. 1569)

=== October–December ===
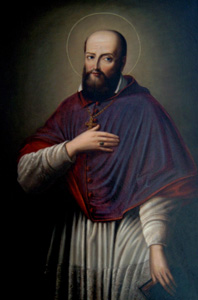
Francis de Sales

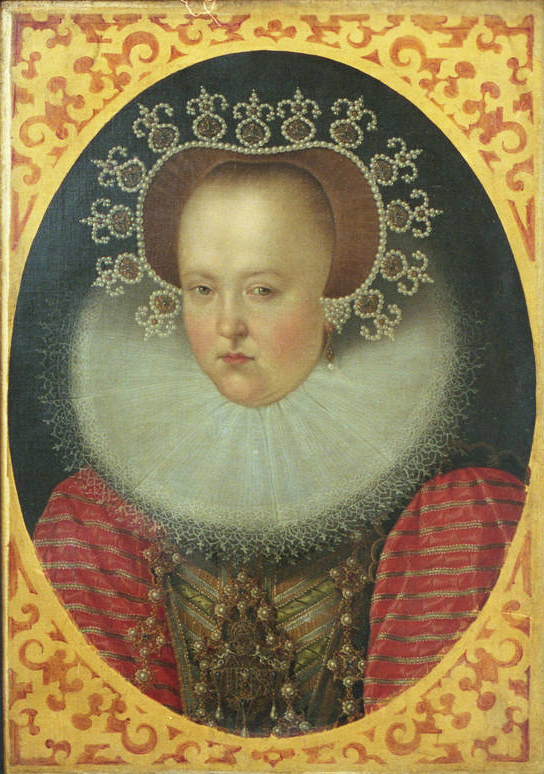
Sophie of Brandenburg

- October 9 – John II, Duke of Schleswig-Holstein-Sonderburg (b. 1545)
- October 28 – Peter Petreius, Swedish writer and diplomat (b. 1570)
- October 31 – Ulrich, Duke of Pomerania, Bishop of Cammin and non-reigning Duke of Pomerania (b. 1589)
- November 2 – Johann Lohel, Bohemian Catholic archbishop (b. 1549)
- November 12 – Sir George Savile, 1st Baronet of England (b. 1551)
- November 14 – Miler Magrath, Irish Catholic priest (b. 1523)
- November 17 – Pierre Biard, French settler, Jesuit missionary (b. 1567)
- Late November – Squanto (Tisquantum), Native American, last survivor of the Patuxet
- December 7 – Sophie of Brandenburg, Regent of Saxony (1591–1601) (b. 1568)
- December 12 – Bartolomeo Manfredi, Italian painter (b. 1582)
- December 13 – Johannes Vodnianus Campanus, Czech humanist, composer and dramatist (b. 1572)
- December 28 – Francis de Sales, Bishop of Geneva and saint (b. 1567)

=== Date unknown ===
- John Welsh of Ayr, Scottish Presbyterian leader (b. 1568)

1623

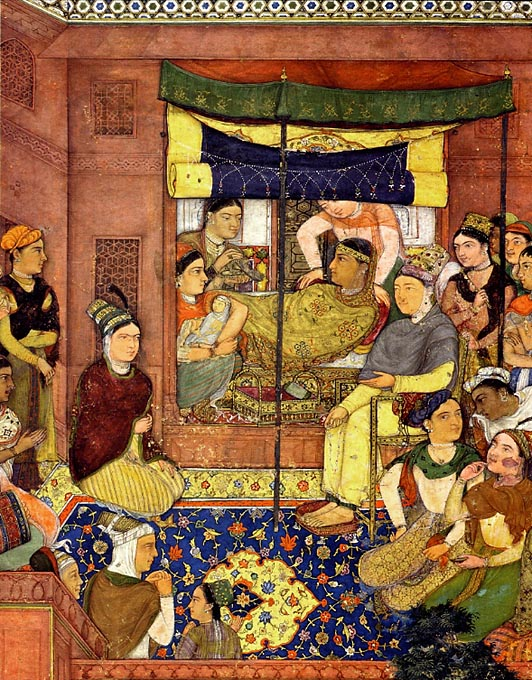
Mariam-uz-Zamani

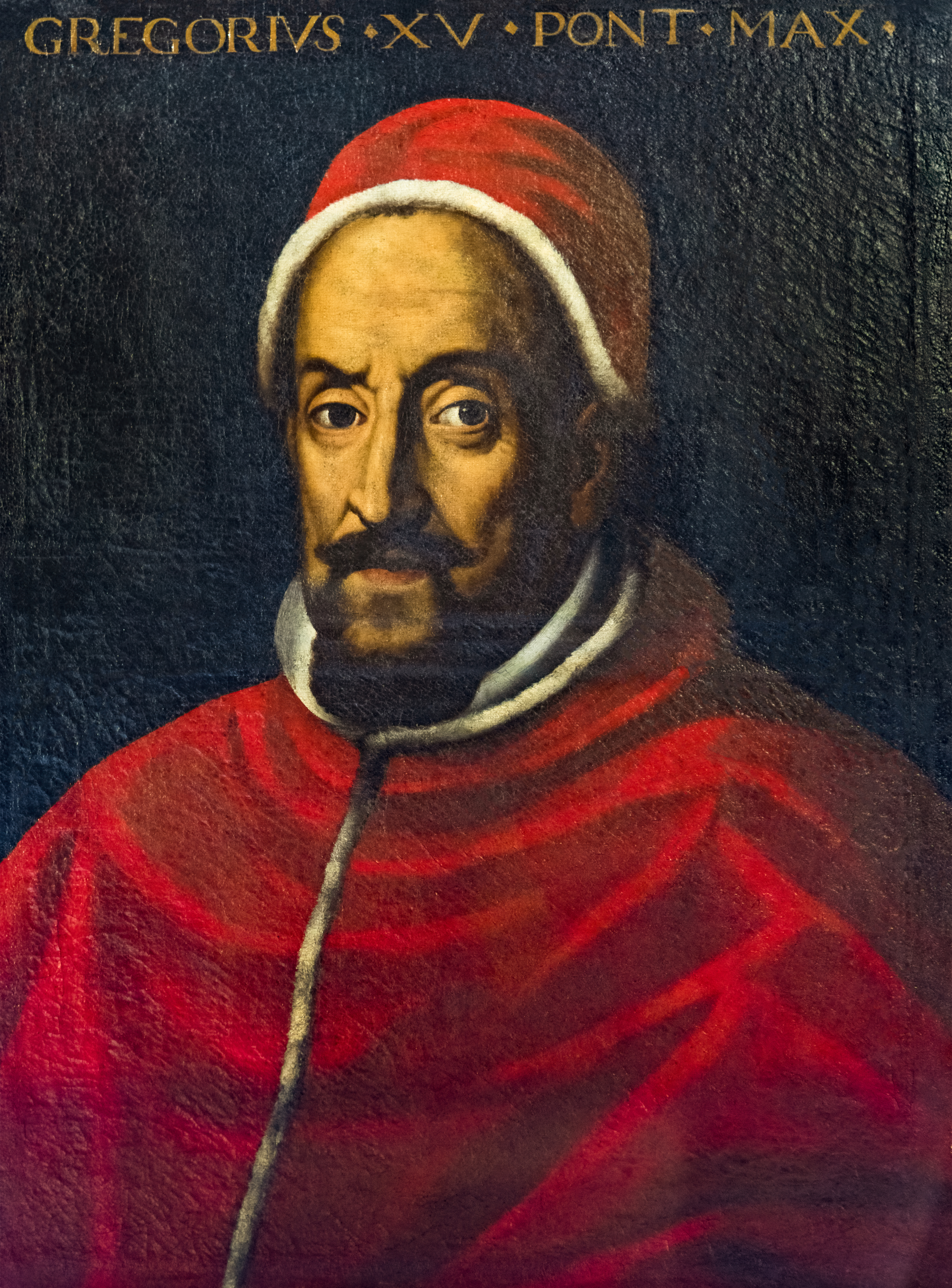
Pope Gregory XV died 8 July

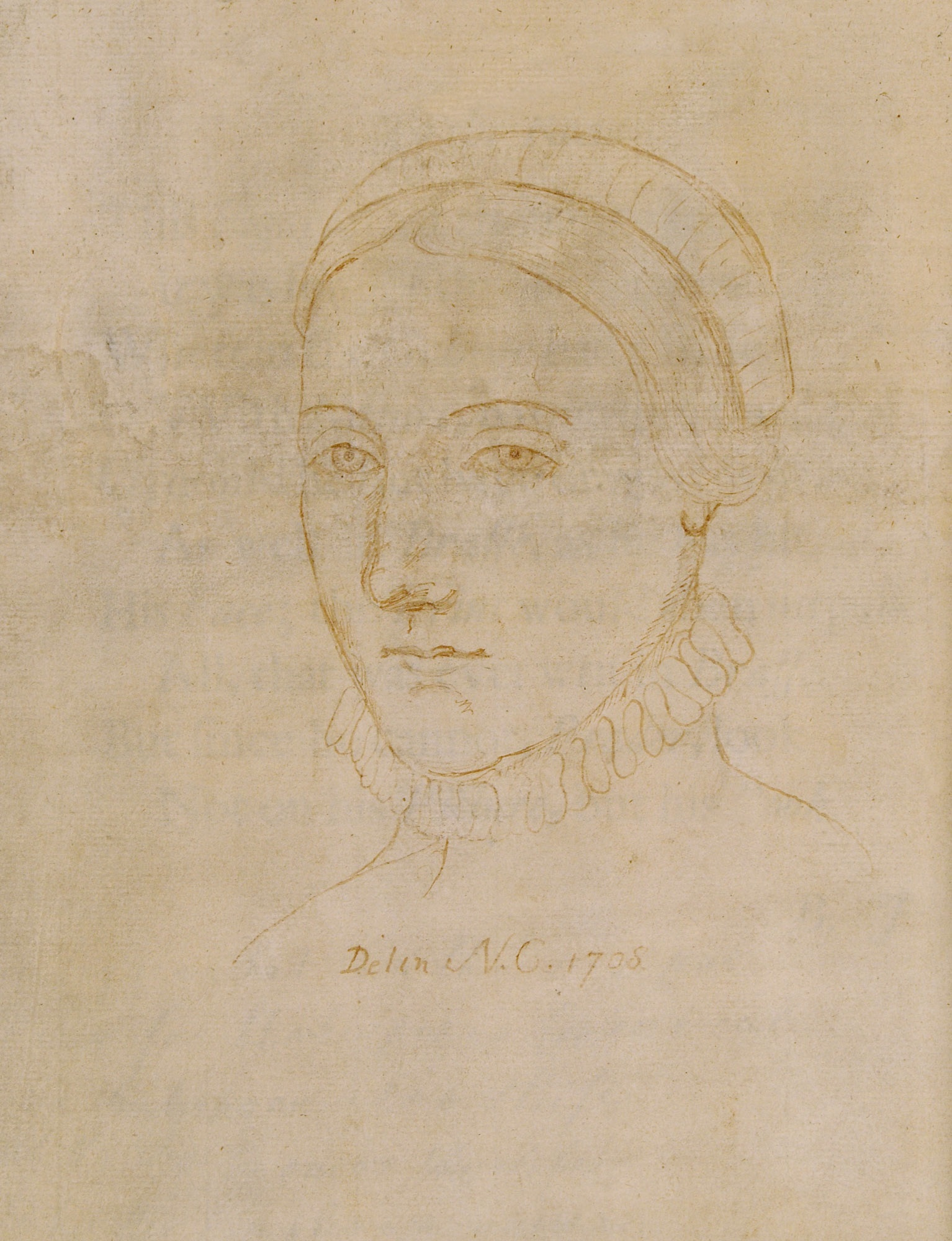
Anne Hathaway

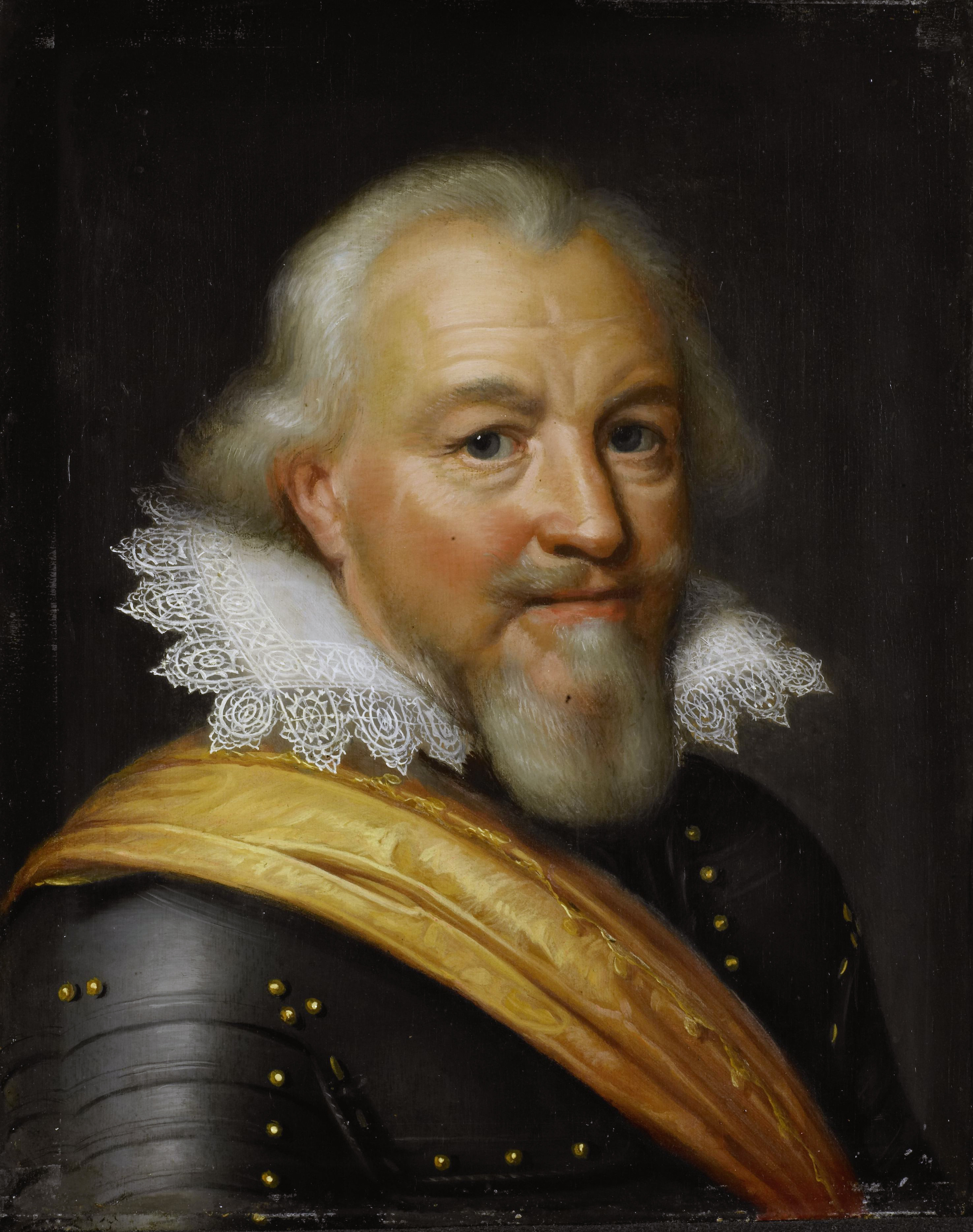
John VII, Count of Nassau-Siegen

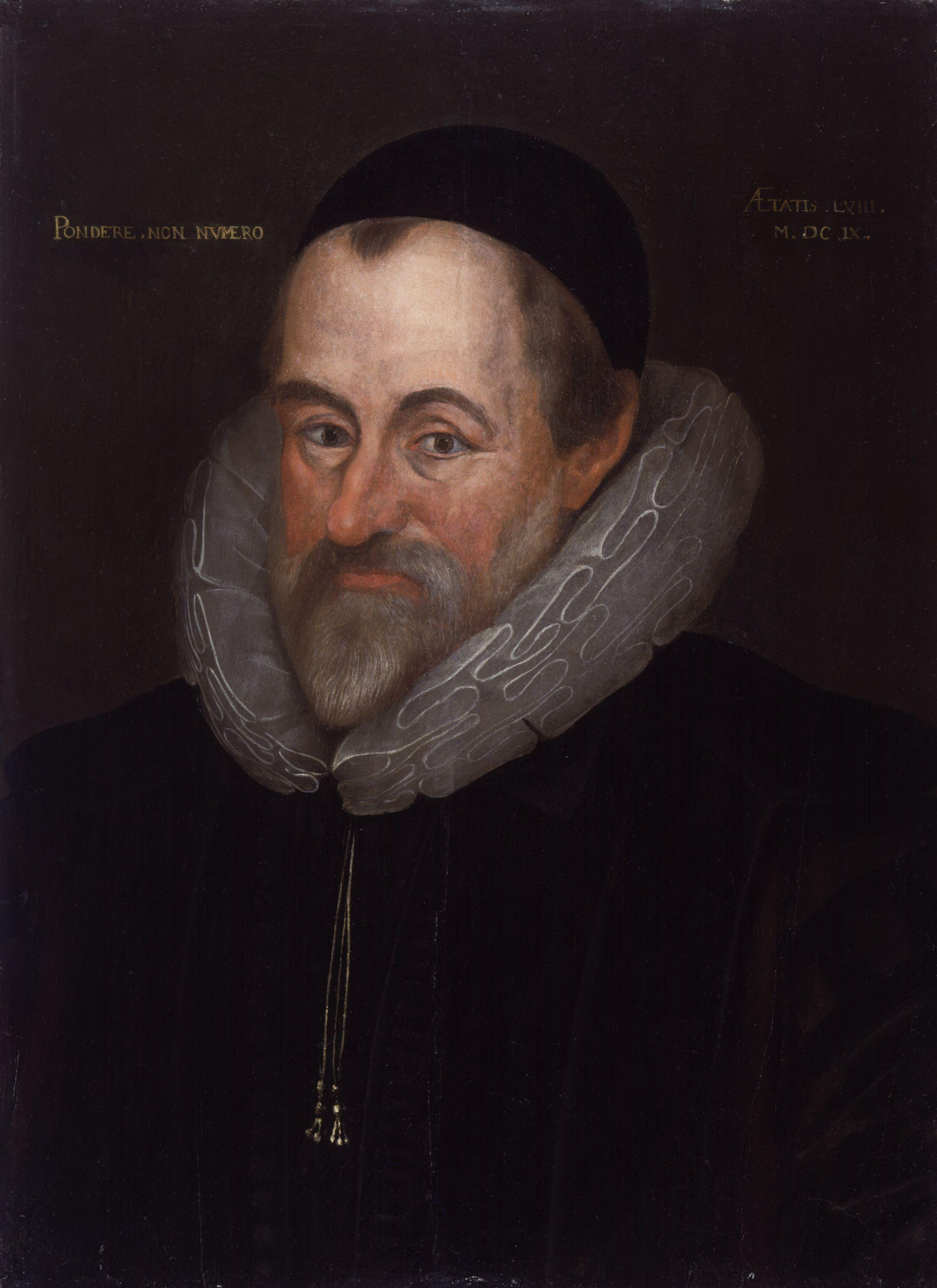
William Camden

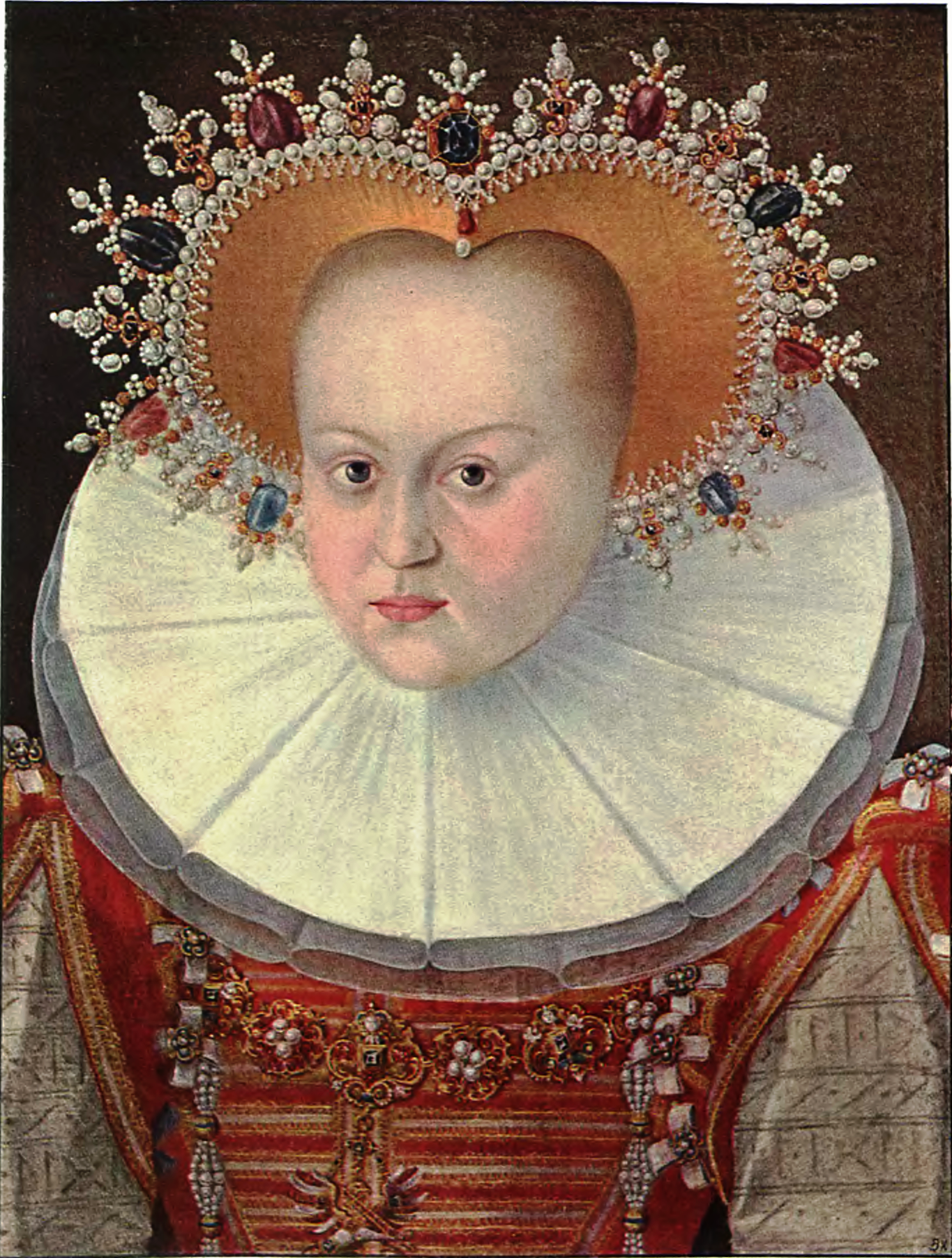
Erdmuthe of Brandenburg

=== January–March ===
- January 1
  - Paul Hentzner, German lawyer and traveller in England (b. 1558)
  - Christopher Heydon, English politician (b. 1561)
- January 11 – Pieter van Mierevelt, Dutch painter (b. 1596)
- January 15
  - Paolo Sarpi, Italian theologian (b. 1552)
  - Leonardus Lessius, Flemish Jesuit theologian (b. 1554)
- February – Malcolm Macfie, last chief of the Scottish clan Clan Macfie
- February 8 – Thomas Cecil, 1st Earl of Exeter, English politician (b. 1546)
- February 19 – Clara Maria of Pomerania-Barth, German noble (b. 1574)
- March 7 – Luís Mendes de Vasconcellos, Portuguese 55th Grandmaster of the Knights Hospitaller (b. c. 1542)
- March 19 – Philip Sigismund of Brunswick-Wolfenbüttel, German Catholic bishop (b. 1568)
- March 25 – Henri de La Tour d'Auvergne, Duke of Bouillon (b. 1555)
- March 29 – Scévole de Sainte-Marthe, French poet (b. 1536)

=== April–June ===
- April 14 – John Scudamore, English politician (b. 1542)
- April 19 – Uesugi Kagekatsu, Japanese samurai and warlord (b. 1556)
- April 26 – Bálint Lépes, Hungarian cardinal (b. c. 1570)
- April 27 – Eric of Lorraine, Bishop of Verdun (b. 1576)
- May 1 – Matthew Clerke, English politician (b. 1564)
- May 4 – Asprilio Pacelli, Italian Baroque composer (b. 1570)
- May 19 – Mariam-uz-Zamani, Empress of the Mughal Empire (b. 1542)
- May 23 – Edward Lawley, English politician (b. 1586)
- May 26 – Francis Anthony, English apothecary and physician (b. 1550)
- June 28 – Federico Ubaldo della Rovere, Duke of Urbino, Italian noble (b. 1605)

=== July–September ===
- July 3 – Claes Michielsz Bontenbal, Dutch civil servant (b. 1575)
- July 4 – William Byrd, English composer (b. 1543)
- July 8 – Pope Gregory XV (b. 1554)
- July 12 – William Bourchier, 3rd Earl of Bath (b. 1557)
- August 6 – Anne Hathaway, wife of English dramatist William Shakespeare (b. 1555)
- August 9 – George, Count of Nassau-Dillenburg, Count of Nassau-Beilstein (1607–1620), then Count of Nassau-Dillenburg (1620–1623) (b. 1562)
- August 12
  - Antonio Priuli, Doge of Venice (b. 1548)
  - Stefano Pignatelli, Italian Catholic cardinal (b. 1578)
- August 31 – Jacob van Wassenaer Duivenvoorde, Dutch admiral (b. 1574)
- September 1 – Marcantonio Gozzadini, Italian Catholic cardinal (b. 1574)
- September 26 – Edwin Sandys, English politician (b. 1591)
- September 27 – John VII, Count of Nassau-Siegen (b. 1561)
- September 28 – Johann Georg, Prince of Hohenzollern-Hechingen (b. 1577)

=== October–December ===
- October 21 – William Wade, English statesman and diplomat (b. 1546)
- October 31 – Deposed Queen Yu, consort of Yi Hon, King Gwanghae of Joseon (b. 1576)
- November 9 – William Camden, English antiquarian (b. 1551)
- November 11 – Philippe de Mornay, French writer (b. 1549)
- November 12 – Josaphat Kuncevyc, Lithuanian archbishop (b. c. 1582)
- November 13 – Erdmuthe of Brandenburg, Duchess of Pomerania-Stettin (b. 1561)
- December 4 – Jerome de Angelis, Italian Jesuit missionary to Japan (b. 1567)
- December 24 – Michiel Coignet, Flemish mathematician, astronomer, engineer and scientific instrument maker (b. 1549)

=== Date unknown ===
- Andrea Andreani, Italian engraver (b. 1540)

1624

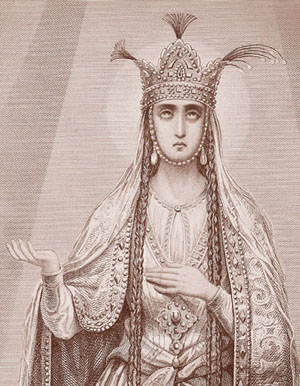
Ketevan the Martyr

Willem Pieterszoon Buytewech

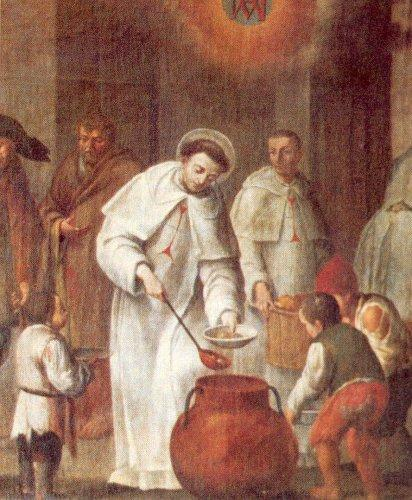
Simón de Rojas

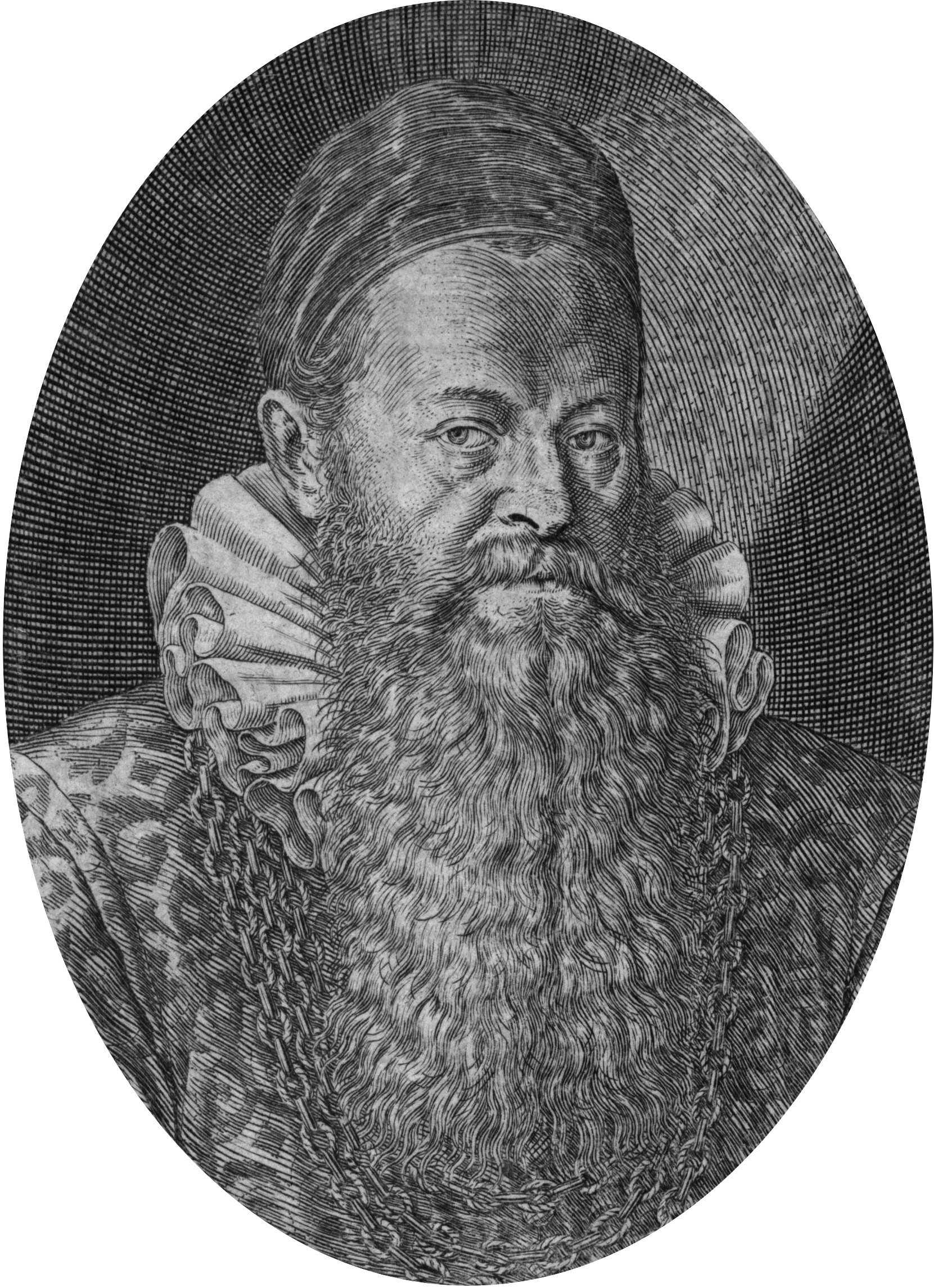
Gaspard Bauhin

John Kendrick

=== January–March ===
- January 3 – Jacopo Inghirami, Tuscan admiral (b. 1565)
- January 17 – Tamás Erdődy, Hungarian noble, Ban of Croatia (b. 1558)
- January 24 – Martin Becanus, Dutch Jesuit priest (b. 1563)
- February 4 – Vicente Espinel, Spanish writer (b. 1550)
- February 6 – Lamoral, 1st Prince of Ligne (b. 1563)
- February 7 – Cort Aslakssøn, Norwegian astronomer (b. 1564)
- February 12 – George Heriot, Scottish goldsmith and philanthropist (b. 1563)
- February 13 – Stephen Gosson, English satirist (b. 1554)
- February 16 – Ludovic Stewart, 2nd Duke of Lennox, Scottish nobleman and politician (b. 1574)
- February 17 – Juan de Mariana, Spanish historian (b. 1536)
- February 18 – Francis Ros, first Latin Archbishop of Angamaly-Cranganore (b. 1559)
- February 19 – Thomas Fleming, English politician (b. 1572)
- February 21 – John Adolph, Duke of Schleswig-Holstein-Sonderburg-Norburg, Duke of Norburg at Als (b. 1576)
- February 24 – Paul Laurentius, German divine (b. 1554)
- February 28 – Clemens Timpler, German philosopher (b. 1563)
- March 15 – Louis of Anhalt-Köthen, German prince (b. 1607)
- March 27 – Ulrik of Denmark, Danish prince-bishop (b. 1578)
- March 28 – Richard Sackville, 3rd Earl of Dorset, English noble (b. 1589)

=== April–June ===
- April 13 – William Bishop, first Roman Catholic bishop after the English Reformation (b. 1553)
- April 17 – Mariana Navarro de Guevarra Romero, Spanish Catholic nun who became a member of the Mercedarian Tertiaries (b. 1565)
- May 27 – Diego Ramírez de Arellano, Spanish sailor and cosmographer (b. c. 1580)
- June 2 – Jacques l'Hermite, Dutch admiral and explorer (b. 1582)
- June 4 – Rombertus van Uylenburgh, Dutch lawyer (b. 1554)

=== July–September ===
- July – Alonso Fajardo de Entenza, governor of the Philippines
- July 17 – Johan van Dorth, Dutch noble (b. 1574)
- July 22 – García de Silva Figueroa, Spanish diplomat and traveller (b. 1550)
- July 31 – Henry II of Lorraine (b. 1563)
- August 4 – Emanuel Filibert of Savoy, Viceroy of Sicily (b. 1588)
- August 21 – Francesco Andreini, Italian actor (b. c. 1548)
- August 25 – Luis Sotelo, Spanish Franciscan friar (b. 1574)
- September – Marco Antonio de Dominis, Dalmatian archbishop and apostate (b. 1560)
- September 13 – Ketevan the Martyr, queen of Kakheti (b. c. 1560)
- September 17 – Gilles du Monin, Belgian Jesuit historian (b. 1565)
- September 18 – Pedro Osores de Ulloa, Royal Governor of Chile (b. 1554)
- September 23 – Willem Pieterszoon Buytewech, Dutch Golden Age painter (b. 1592)
- September 25 – Fronton du Duc, French Jesuit theologian (b. 1558)
- September 29 – Simón de Rojas, Spanish saint (b. 1552)

=== October–December ===
- November 2 – Cornelis van der Voort, Dutch painter (b. 1576)
- November 5 – James Wriothesley, Lord Wriothesley, English politician (b. 1605)
- November 10 – Henry Wriothesley, 3rd Earl of Southampton, English patron of the theatre (b. 1573)
- November 13 – Thomas van Erpe, Dutch Orientialist, cartographer (b. 1584)
- November 14 – Costanzo Antegnati, Italian composer, organist (b. 1549)
- November 15 – Caius of Korea, Japanese martyr (b. 1571)
- November 17 – Jakob Böhme, German mystic (b. 1575)
- December 5 – Gaspard Bauhin, Swiss botanist (b. 1560)
- December 6 – Francesco Contarini, Doge of Venice (b. 1556)
- December 9 – Flaminio Scala, Italian playwright and stage actor (b. 1552)
- December 14 – Charles Howard, 1st Earl of Nottingham, English statesman (b. 1536)
- December 15 – Jerónimo Bautista Lanuza, Spanish friar, bishop and writer (b. 1533)
- December 25
  - Hajikano Masatsugu, Japanese samurai (b. 1545)
  - Catherine of Nassau-Dillenburg, German noble (b. 1543)
- December 28 – Charles of Austria, Bishop of Wroclaw, Prince-bishop of Wroclaw (b. 1590)
- December 29 – Dermod O'Brien, 5th Baron Inchiquin, Irish baron (b. 1594)

1625

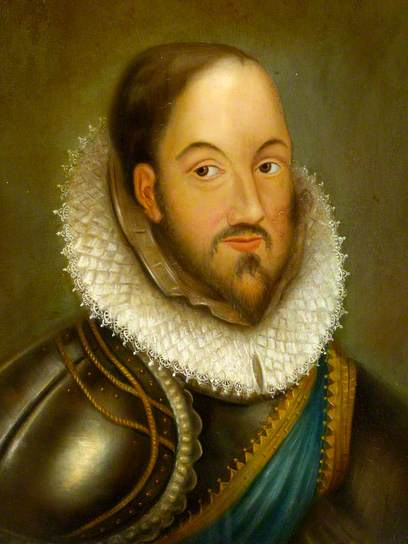
Arthur Chichester, 1st Baron Chichester died 19 February

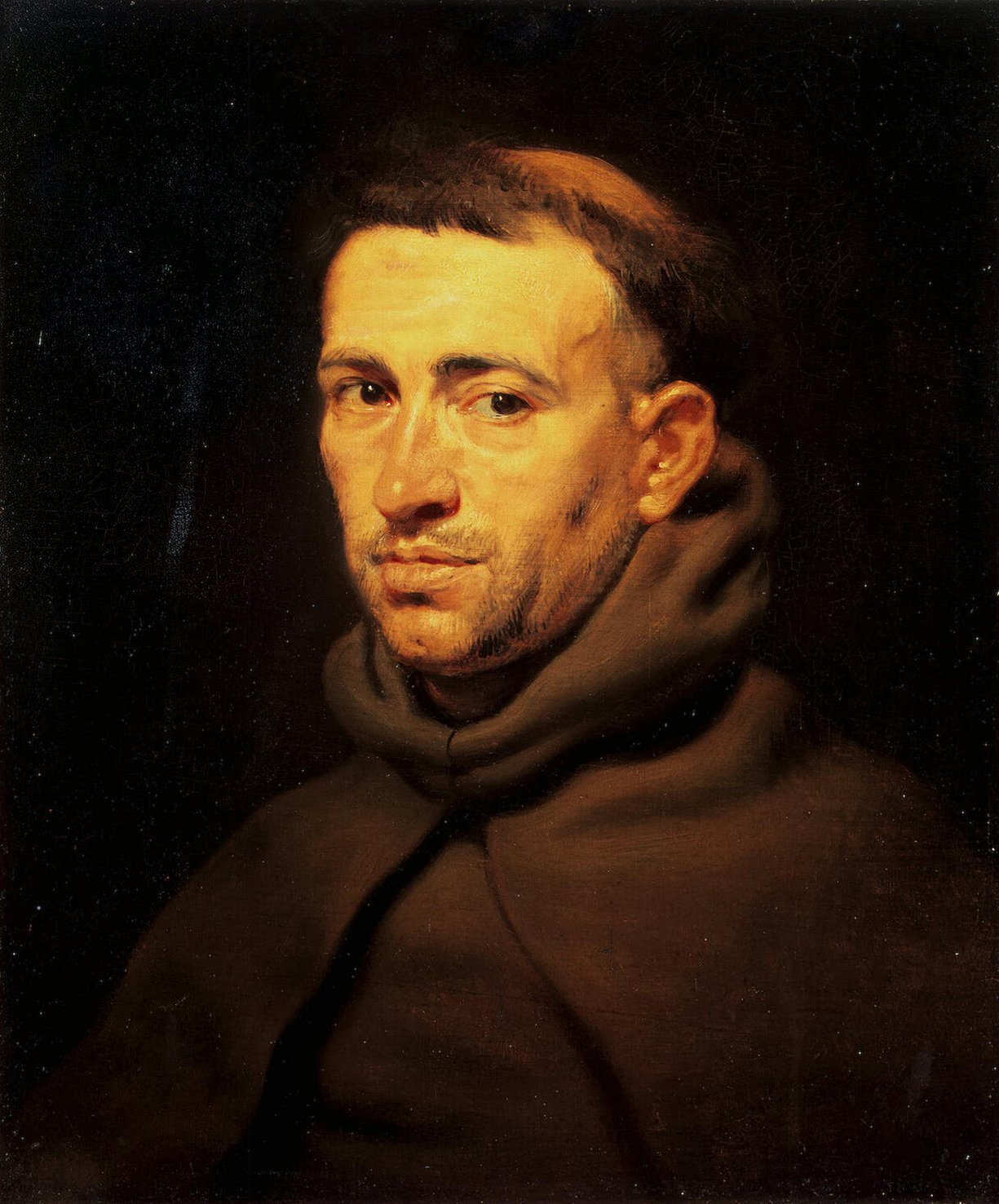
Andres de Soto died 5 April

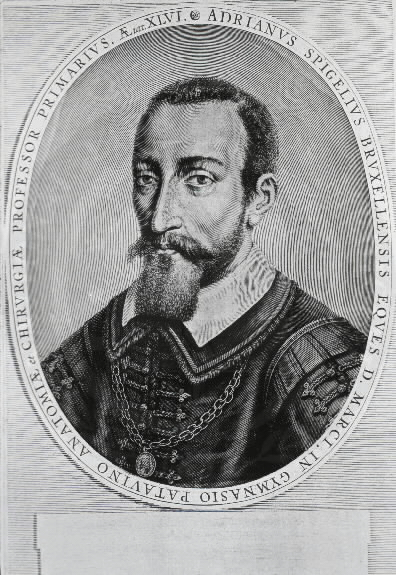
Adriaan van den Spiegel died 7 April

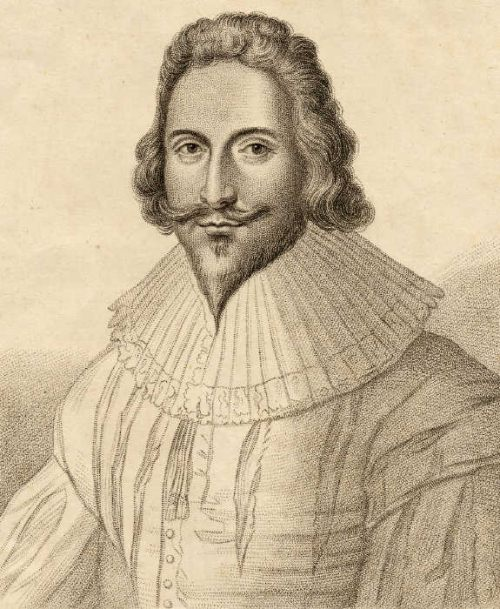
Edward la Zouche, 11th Baron Zouche died 18 August

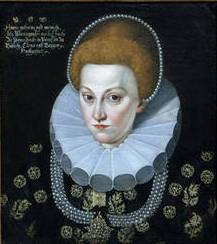
Duchess Anna of Prussia died 30 August

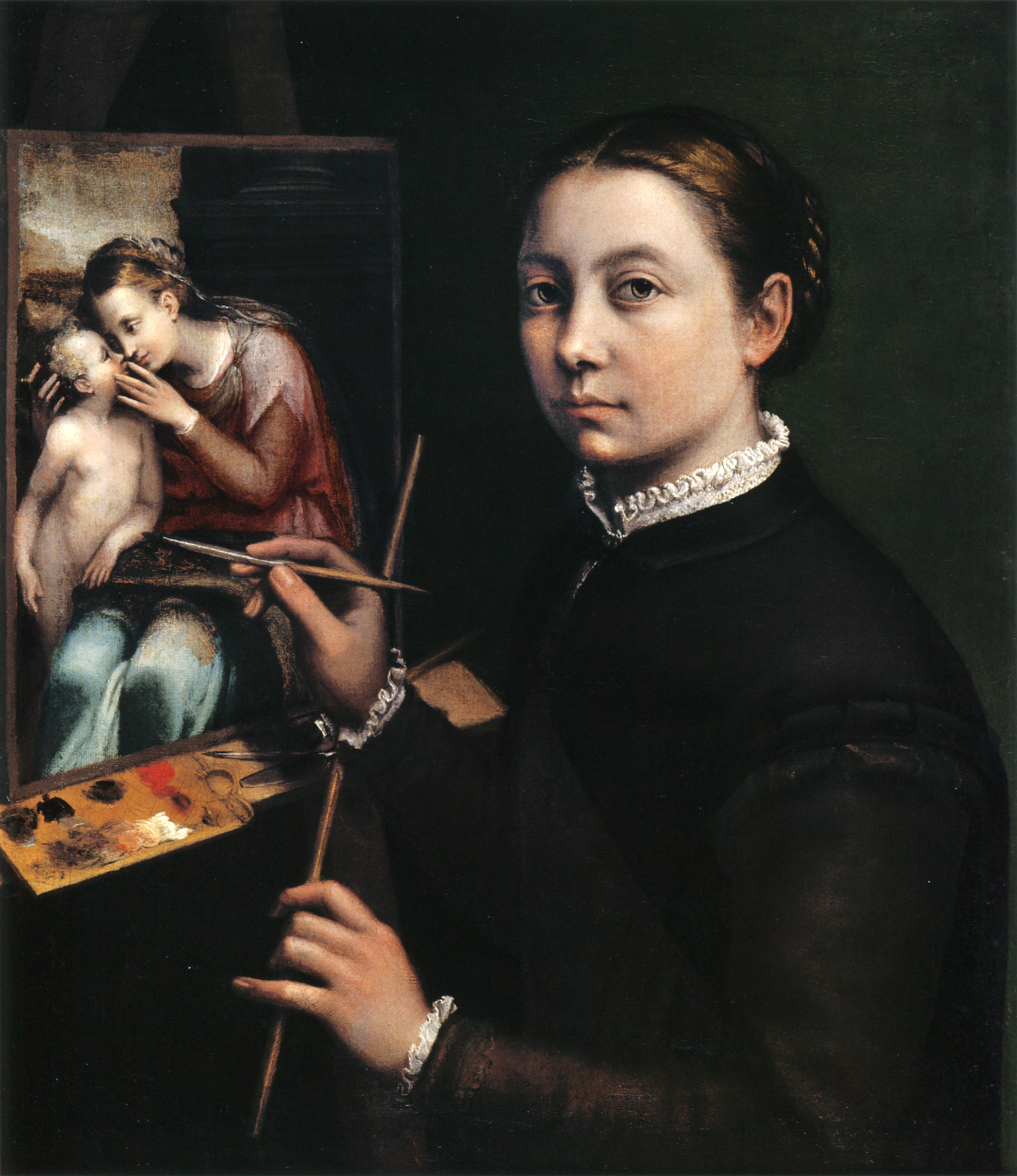
Sofonisba Anguissola died 16 November

=== January–March ===
- January/February – Robert Cushman, English Plymouth Colony settler (b. 1577)
- January 5 – Simon Marius, German astronomer (b. 1573)
- January 7 – Ruggiero Giovannelli, Italian composer (b. c. 1560)
- January 17 – Maria Dolgorukova, first spouse of Tsar Michael I of Russia (b. c. 1601)
- January 18 – John Pakington, English noble (b. 1549)
- January 23 – Count John III of Rietberg (b. 1566)
- January 27 – Adrianus Valerius, Dutch National Anthem writer (b. c. 1575)
- January 29 – Jacob Gretser, German Jesuit writer (b. 1562)
- February 6 – Philipp Julius, Duke of Pomerania (b. 1584)
- February 19 – Arthur Chichester, 1st Baron Chichester, English peer (b. 1563)
- February 26
  - Anna Vasa of Sweden, Polish and Swedish princess (b. 1568)
  - Jeremiah of Wallachia, Romanian-born Capuchin lay brother, who spent his entire adult life serving as an infirmarian of the Order in Italy (b. 1556)
- March 2 – James Hamilton, 2nd Marquess of Hamilton (b. 1589)
- March 7
  - Johann Bayer, German lawyer and uranographer (celestial cartographer) (b. 1572)
  - Joachim Ernst, Margrave of Brandenburg-Ansbach (1603–1625) (b. 1583)
- March 26 – Giambattista Marino, Italian poet (b. 1569)
- March 27 – King James VI of Scotland/James I of England and Ireland (b. 1566)
- March 28 or March 29 – Antonio de Herrera y Tordesillas, Spanish historian (b. 1549)

=== April–June ===
- April 5 – Andres de Soto, Franciscan preacher and spiritual writer (b. 1552)
- April 7 – Adriaan van den Spiegel, Flemish physician, anatomist (b. 1578)
- April 10 – Michael de Sanctis, Spanish Trinitarian priest (b. 1591)
- April 15 – Thomas Field, Irish Jesuit (b. 1546)
- April 16 – Nicholas Assheton, English country squire, writer (b. 1590)
- April 23 – Maurice, Prince of Orange (b. 1567)
- April 30
  - Marco Passionei, Italian Catholic, member of the Order of Friars Minor (b. 1560)
  - Lawrence Tanfield, British politician (b. 1551)
- May 7 – John Garrard, Lord Mayor of London (1601-1602) (b. 1550)
- May 25 – William Barlow, British scientist (b. 1603)
- June 1 – Honoré d'Urfé, French writer (b. 1568)
- June 2 – Mōri Terumoto, Japanese warrior (b. 1553)
- June 5 – Orlando Gibbons, English composer and organist (b. 1583)

=== July–September ===
- July 1 – Teimuraz I, Prince of Mukhrani, Georgian prince (b. 1572)
- July 19 – Samuel Besler, Polish composer (b. 1574)
- July 26 – Johannes Piscator, German theologian (b. 1546)
- August 3 – Ludovico Bertonio, Italian missionary (b. 1552)
- August 14 – Hans Rottenhammer, German artist (b. 1564)
- August 15 – Mary Cholmondeley, English medieval lady, litigant over her inheritance (b. 1563)
- August 18 – Edward la Zouche, 11th Baron Zouche, English diplomat (b. 1556)
- August 19 – Enno III, Count of East Frisia, Count of Ostfriesland (1599-1625) from the Cirksena Family (b. 1563)
- August 29 – John Fletcher, English writer (b. 1579)
- August 30 – Duchess Anna of Prussia, daughter of Albert Frederick (b. 1576)
- September 4 – Thomas Smythe, English diplomat (b. 1558)
- September 6 – Thomas Dempster, Scottish historian (b. 1579)
- September 11 – Charles Montagu, English politician (b. 1564)
- September 14
  - Pieter Isaacsz, Dutch painter (b. 1569)
  - Edward Mayhew, English priest (b. 1569)
- September 19 – Eitel Frederick von Hohenzollern-Sigmaringen, German Catholic cardinal (b. 1582)
- September 20 – Heinrich Meibom, German historian and poet (b. 1555)
- September 26 – Edward Stafford, 4th Baron Stafford of England (b. 1572)

=== October–December ===
- October 1 – César Oudin, French translator (b. 1560)
- October 6 – Anthony Irby, English politician (b. 1547)
- October 22 – Kikkawa Hiroie, Japanese politician (b. 1561)
- October 24
  - Duke Friedrich of Saxe-Altenburg, Third son of Duke Friedrich Wilhelm I of Saxe-Weimar (b. 1599)
  - Abraham Scultetus, German theologian (b. 1566)
- October 25 – Hans Michael Elias von Obentraut, Palatinate cavalry general in the Thirty Years' War (b. 1574)
- November 3 – Adam Gumpelzhaimer, German composer (b. 1559)
- November 16 – Sofonisba Anguissola, Italian painter (b. c. 1532)
- November 19 – Johann Reinhard I, Count of Hanau-Lichtenberg (b. 1569)
- December 8 – Christina of Holstein-Gottorp, queen consort of King Charles IX of Sweden (b. 1573)
- December 9 – Ubbo Emmius, Dutch historian and geographer (b. 1547)
- December 16 – Elizabeth of Hesse-Kassel, Duchess of Mecklenburg-Gütsrow (b. 1596)
- December 27 – Charles Baillie, Flemish-born Scottish papal agent (b. 1542)

=== Date unknown ===
- Richard Fowns, English divine (b. 1560?)
- Willem Schouten, Dutch navigator (died at sea) (b. c. 1567)
- Juan de las Roelas, Spanish artist (b. 1558)

1626

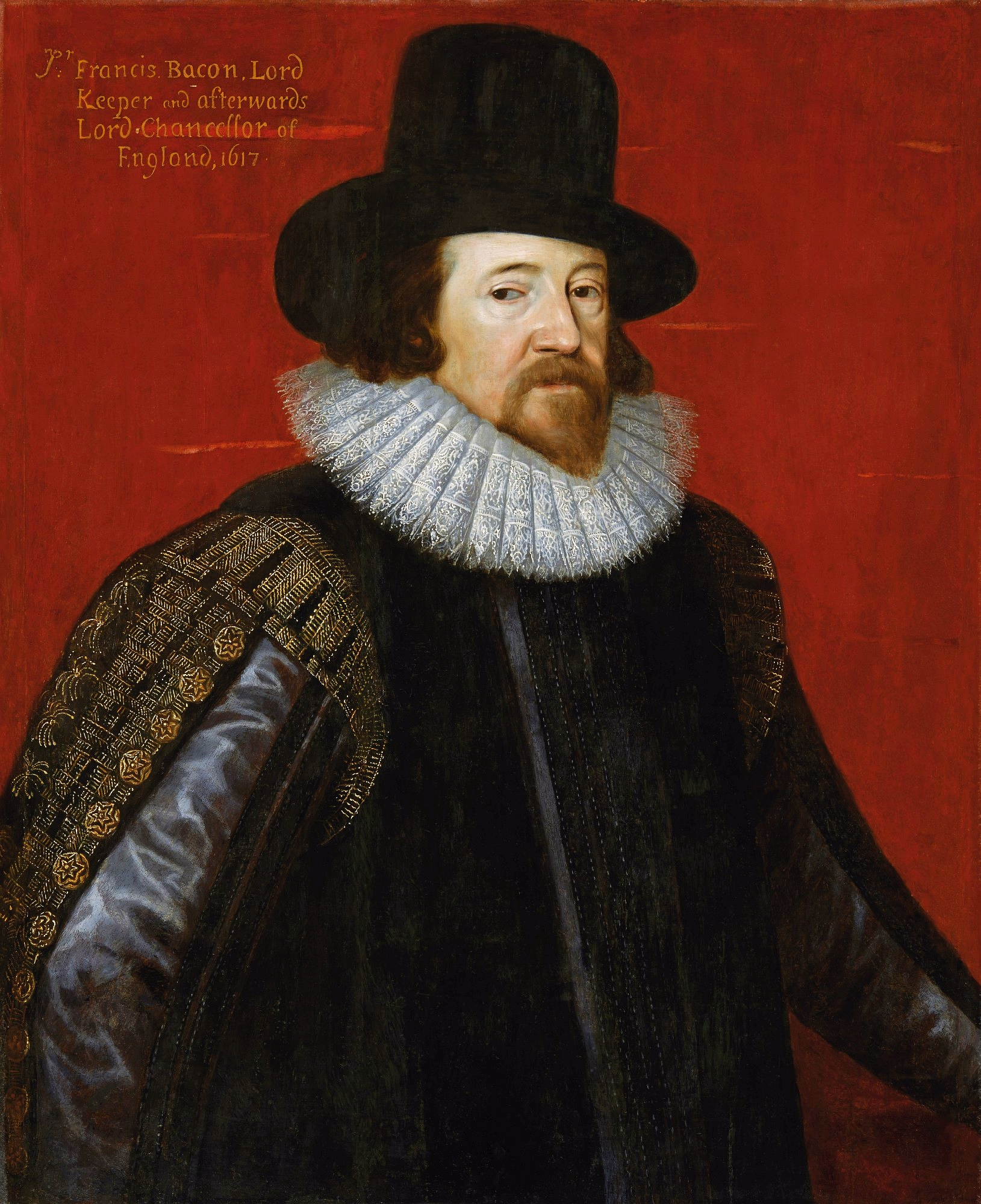
Francis Bacon died 9 April

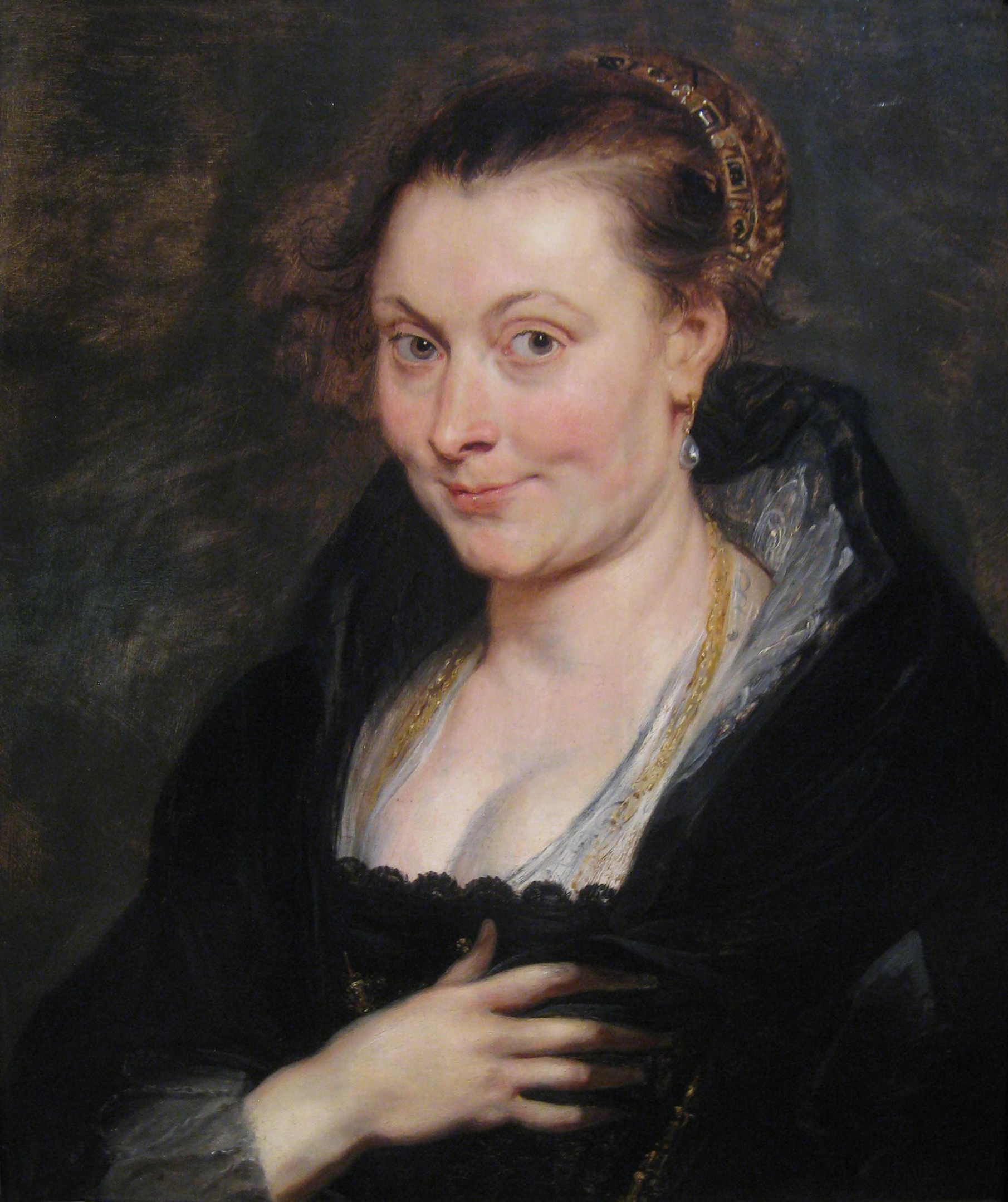
Isabella Brant died 15 July

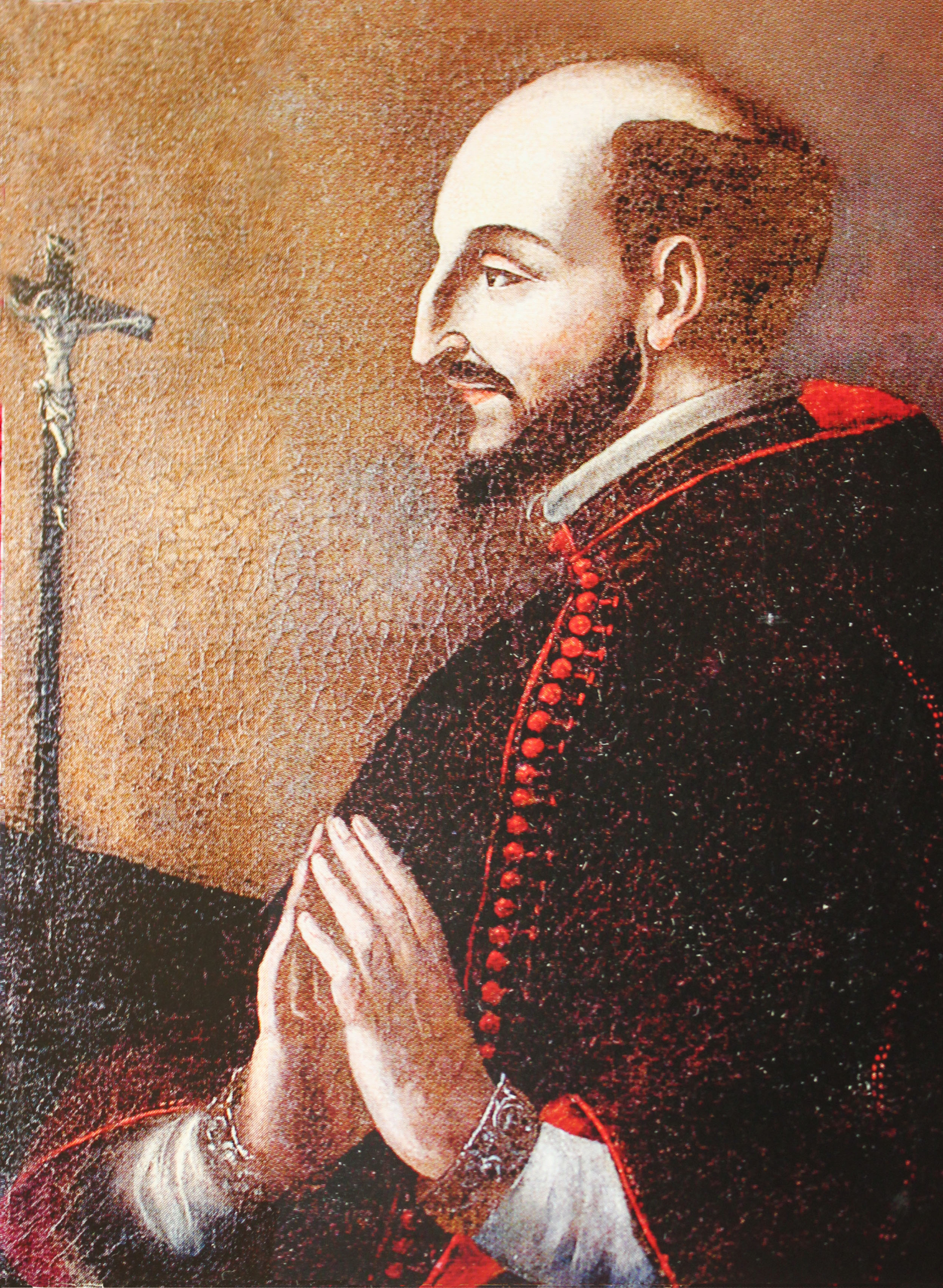
Antonio Franco (blessed) died 2 September

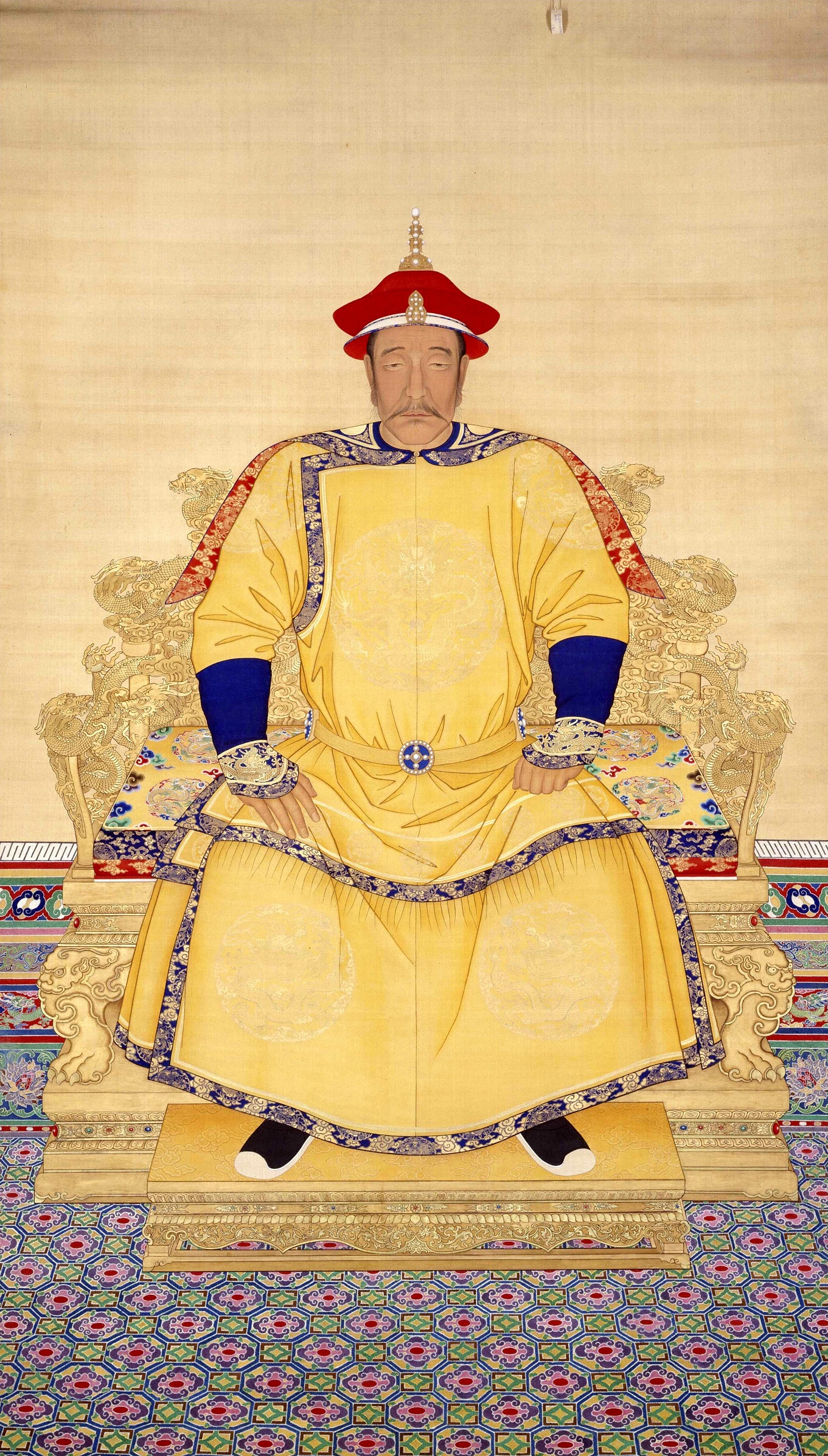
Nurhaci died 30 September

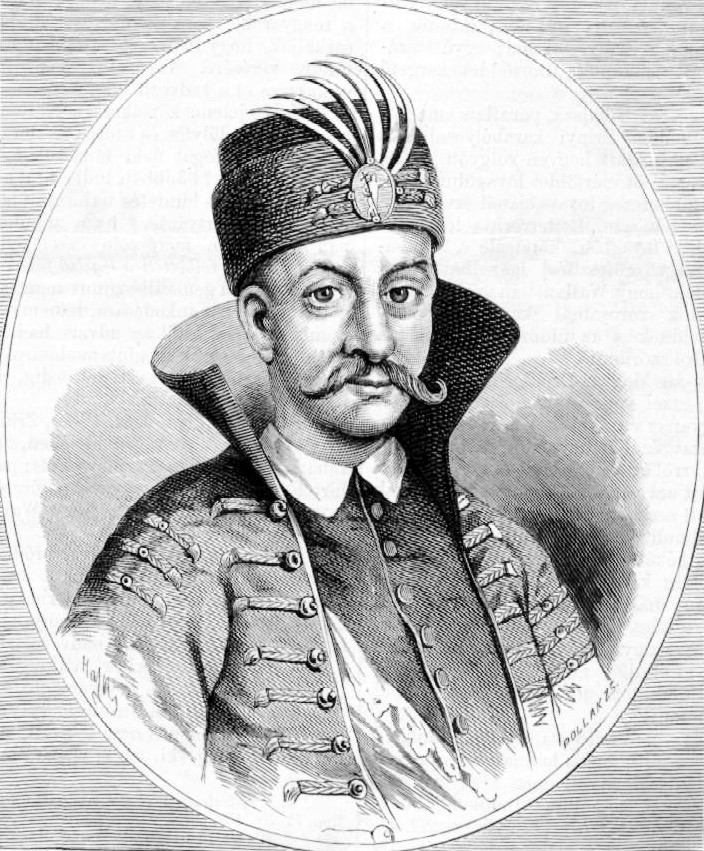
Juraj V Zrinski died 28 December

- January 2 – Maria Buynosova-Rostovskaya (b. 1590)
- January 19 – Ruqaiya Sultan Begum (b. 1542)
- January 23 – Decio Carafa, Archbishop of Naples who had previously served as papal nuncio to the Spanish Netherlands (1606–1607) and to Habsburg Spain (1607–1611) (b. 1556)
- January 24 – Samuel Argall, English adventurer and naval officer (b. 1580)
- c. January? – Patrick Galloway, Moderator of the General Assembly of the Church of Scotland (b. c. 1551)
- February 7 – William V, Duke of Bavaria (b. 1548)
- February 11 – Pietro Cataldi, Italian mathematician (b. 1552)
- February 20 – John Dowland, English composer and lutenist (b. 1563)
- February 21 – Odoardo Farnese, Italian Catholic cardinal (b. 1573)
- March 3 – William Cavendish, 1st Earl of Devonshire, England (b. 1552)
- March 10 – John Dormer, English Member of Parliament (b. 1556)
- March 19 – Pierre Coton, French Jesuit and royal confessor (b. 1564)
- April 5 – Anna Koltovskaya (b. c. 1552)
- April 9 – Francis Bacon, English scientist and statesman (b. 1561)
- April 11 – Marino Ghetaldi, Croatian mathematician and physicist (b. 1568)
- May 4 – Arthur Lake, Bishop of Bath and Wells, English bishop, Bible translator (b. 1569)
- May 17 – Joan Pau Pujol, Catalan composer (b. 1570)
- May 28 – Thomas Howard, 1st Earl of Suffolk (b. 1561)
- June 7 – Anne of Saint Bartholomew, Spanish Discalced Carmelite nun (b. 1550)
- June 16
  - Albert, Count of Nassau-Dillenburg, joint ruler of Nassau-Dillenburg 1623–1626 (b. 1596)
  - Christian, Duke of Brunswick-Lüneburg-Wolfenbüttel, German Protestant military leader (b. 1599)
- June 29 – Scipione Cobelluzzi, Italian cardinal and archivist (b. 1564)
- June 30 – Honda Tadatoki (b. 1596)
- July 13 – Robert Sidney, 1st Earl of Leicester, English statesman (b. 1563)
- July 15 – Isabella Brant, Flemish artists' model, first wife of painter Peter Paul Rubens (b. 1591)
- July 19 – Elizabeth of Denmark, Duchess of Brunswick-Wolfenbüttel, German regent (b. 1573)
- July 27 – Louis V, Landgrave of Hesse-Darmstadt (b. 1577)
- August 13 – Maria of Brunswick-Lüneburg, Duchess Consort of Saxe-Lauenburg (1582–1619) (b. 1566)
- August 15 – Girolamo Asteo, Roman Catholic prelate who served as Bishop of Veroli (1608–1626) (b. 1562)
- August 23 – Francesco Cereo de Mayda, Roman Catholic prelate who served as Bishop of Lavello (1621–1626) (b. 1568)
- August 25 – Alfonso Pozzi, Roman Catholic prelate who served as Bishop of Borgo San Donnino (1620–1626) (b. 1582)
- August 28 – Isabella of Savoy, Italian noble (b. 1591)
- September 2 – Antonio Franco, Italian Catholic bishop, prelate of Santa Lucia del Mela (b. 1585)
- September 16 – Denis-Simon de Marquemont, French cardinal and archbishop (b. 1572)
- September 17 – Johann Schweikhard von Kronberg, Archbishop-Elector of Mainz from 1604 to 1626 (b. 1553)
- September 21 – François de Bonne, Duke of Lesdiguières, Constable of France (b. 1543)
- September 22 – Aodh Mac Cathmhaoil, Irish Franciscan theologian and Archbishop of Armagh (b. 1571)
- September 25 – Lancelot Andrewes, English scholar (b. 1555)
- September 26 – Wakisaka Yasuharu, Japanese warrior (b. 1554)
- September 30 – Nurhaci, Chinese chieftain (b. 1559)
- October 1 – Lady Abahai (b. 1590)
- October 2 – Diego Sarmiento de Acuña, 1st Count of Gondomar, Spanish diplomat (b. 1567)
- October 10
  - William Hockmere, English politician (b. 1581)
  - Abraham Schadaeus, German music editor (b. 1566)
- October 13 – Domingo de Oña, Roman Catholic prelate, Bishop of Gaeta (1605–1626) (b. 1560)
- October 28 – Muhammad Parviz, Mughal emperor (b. 1589)
- October 29 – Ferdinando Gonzaga, Duke of Mantua, Italian Catholic cardinal (b. 1587)
- October 30 – Willebrord Snell, Dutch astronomer and mathematician (b. 1580)
- November 21 – Anna Maria of Hesse-Kassel, countess consort of Nassau-Saarbrücke (b. 1567)
- November 25 – Edward Alleyn, English actor (b. 1566)
- November 29 – Ernst von Mansfeld, German soldier (b. c. 1580)
- December 6 – John Ernest I, Duke of Saxe-Weimar, German duke (b. 1594)
- December 8 – John Davies, English poet and politician (b. 1569)
- December 10 – Edmund Gunter, English mathematician (b. 1581)
- December 28
  - Gábor Esterházy (1580–1626), Hungarian noble (b. 1580)
  - Juraj V Zrinski, Ban of Croatia (b. 1599)

1627

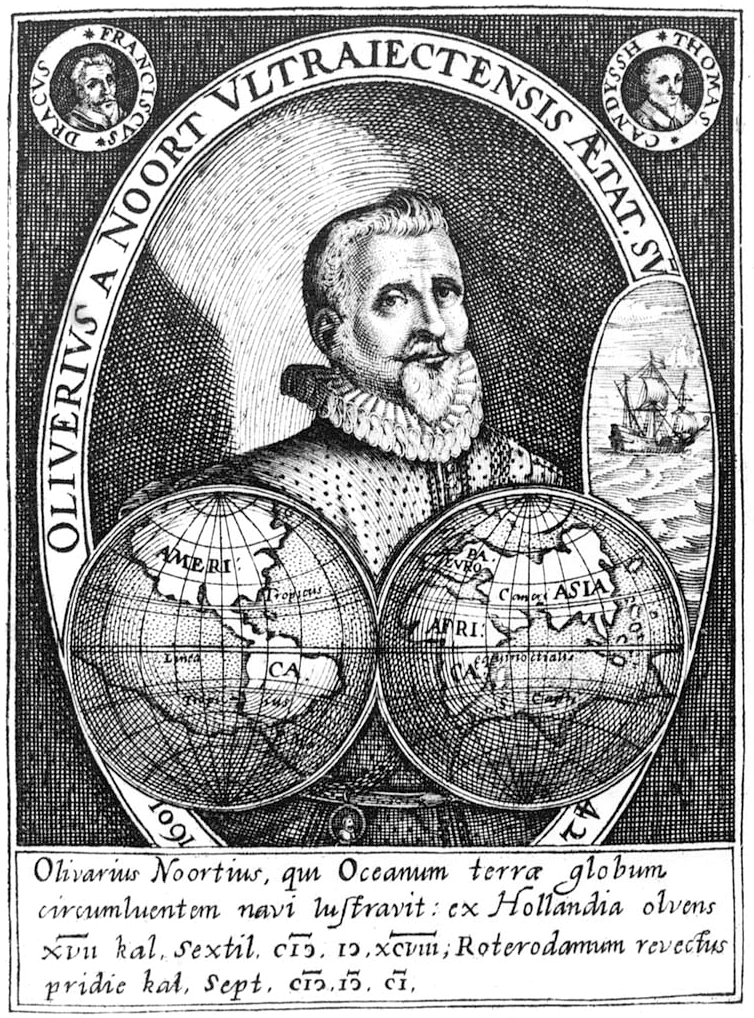
Olivier van Noort

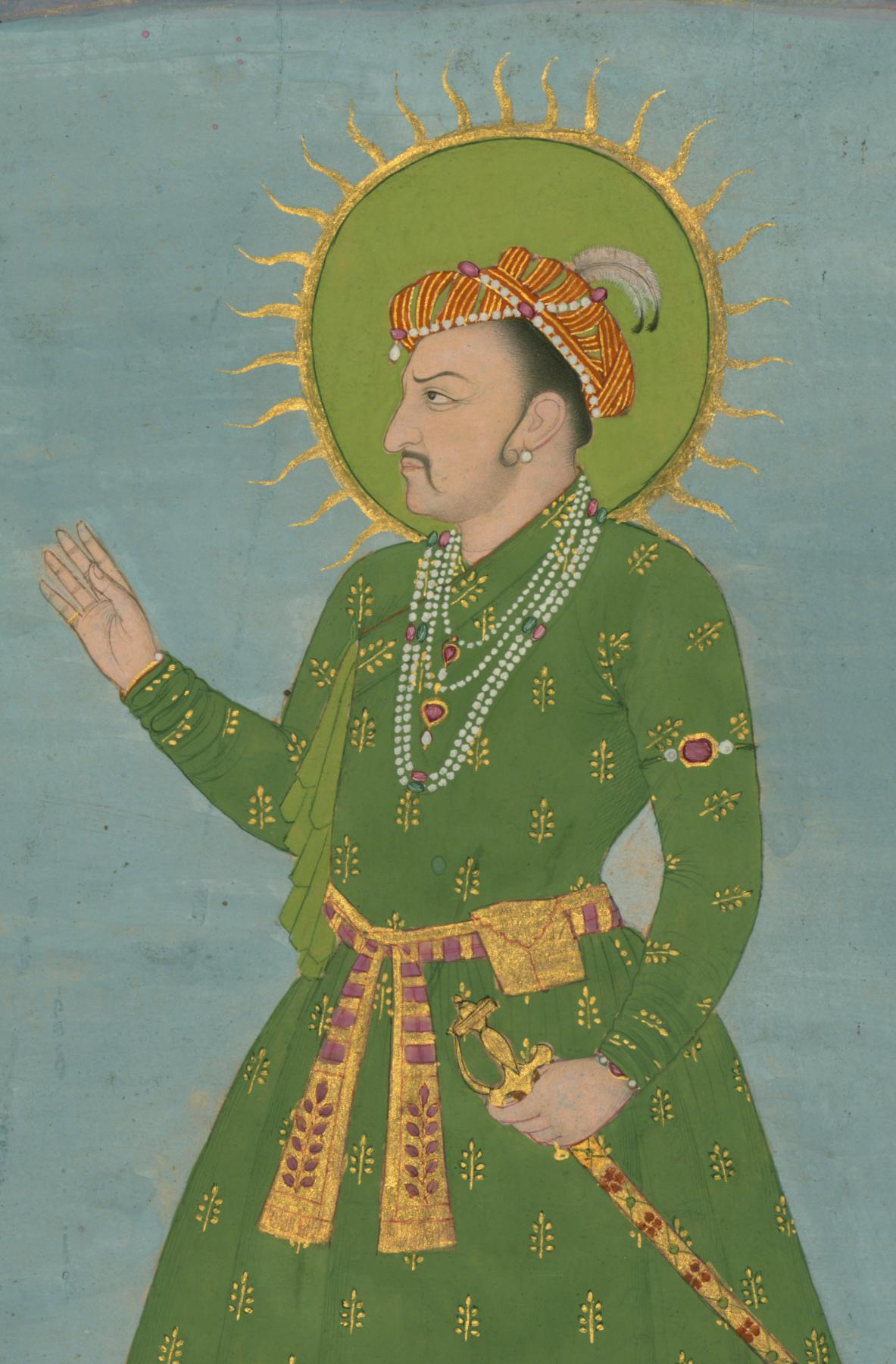
Jahangir

- January 14 – John Casimir, Count of Erbach-Breuberg (1606–1627) (b. 1584)
- January 27 – Princess Cecilia of Sweden (b. 1540)
- February 18 – Edmund Bowyer, English politician (b. 1552)
- February 12 – Karl I, Prince of Liechtenstein (b. 1569)
- February 22 – Olivier van Noort, Dutch navigator (b. 1558)
- March 26 – Simon VII, Count of Lippe-Detmold (1613–1627) (b. 1587)
- March 6 – Krzysztof Zbaraski, Polish statesman (b. 1580)
- March 10 – Elizabeth de Vere, Countess of Derby, British businessman (b. 1575)
- March 20 – Johann Jacob Grasser, Swiss poet, historian and theologian (b. 1579)
- March 23 – Lodovico Zacconi, Italian composer and music theorist (b. 1555)
- March 27 – Sir John Suckling, English politician (b. 1569).
- April 22 – Ahmad Baba al Massufi, Malian academic (b. 1556)
- May 2 – Lodovico Grossi da Viadana, Italian composer (b. 1560)
- May 3 – Edward Russell, 3rd Earl of Bedford, son of Sir Francis Russell (b. 1572)
- May 13 – Alexander, Duke of Schleswig-Holstein-Sonderburg (b. 1573)
- May 18 – Valerius Herberger, German theologian (b. 1562)
- May 19 – Katharina Henot, German General Postmaster, alleged witch (b. 1570)
- May 24 – Luis de Góngora, Spanish poet (b. 1561)
- June 4 – Marie de Bourbon, Duchess of Montpensier, French princess (b. 1605)
- June 27 – Sir John Hayward, English historian (b. c. 1560)
- July 4 (bur.) – Thomas Middleton, English playwright (b. 1580)
- July 17 – Pedro Álvarez de Toledo, 5th Marquis of Villafranca, Spanish noble and politician (b. 1546)
- August 21 – Jacques Mauduit, French composer (b. 1557)
- August 27 – Francesco Maria del Monte, Italian Catholic cardinal (b. 1549)
- September 20 – Jan Gruter, Dutch scholar (b. 1560)
- October 28 – Jahangir, Mughal Emperor of India (b. 1569)
- November 5 – John Ratcliffe, English politician and soldier (b. 1582)
- November 8 – Louis II, Count of Nassau-Weilburg (b. 1565)
- December – Madame Ke, influential nanny of the Tianqi Emperor of China (b. c. 1588)
- December 25 – Vincenzo II Gonzaga, Duke of Mantua, Italian duke and Catholic cardinal (b. 1594)
- date unknown
  - Hendrick Lucifer, Dutch pirate and buccaneer (b. 1583)
  - Marie Vernier, French actress (b. 1590)

1628

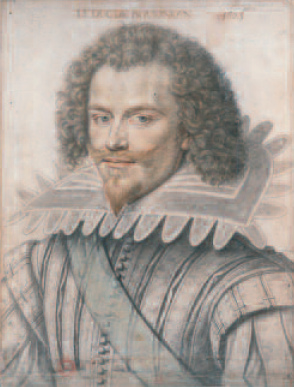
George Villiers, 1st Duke of Buckingham

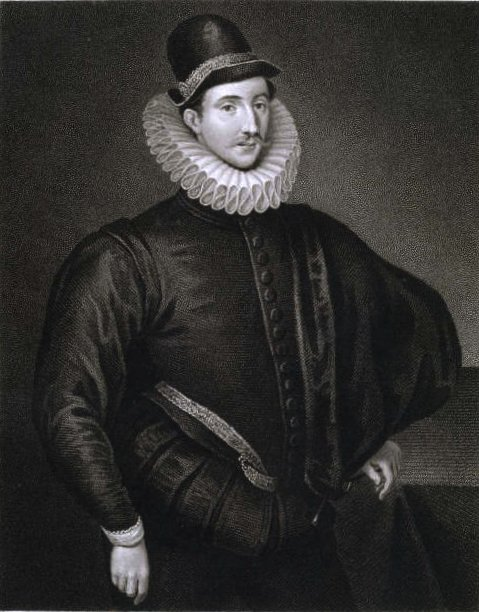
Fulke Greville, 1st Baron Brooke

- January 12 – Francisco Ribalta, Spanish painter (b. 1565)
- January 21 – Gregor Aichinger, German composer (b. c. 1565)
- January 23 – Shahryar, fifth son of the Mughal emperor Jahangir (b. 1605)
- January 29 – Philip Ernest, Count of Hohenlohe-Langenburg (1610–1628) (b. 1584)
- March 12 – John Bull, English composer (b. c. 1562)
- March 29 – Tobias Matthew, English Archbishop of York (b. 1546)
- April 17 – Rudolf Christian, Count of East Frisia, ruler of East Frisia (b. 1602)
- June 8 – Rudolph Goclenius, German philosopher (b. 1547)
- July 11 – David Origanus, German astronomer (b. 1558)
- July 13 – Robert Shirley, English adventurer (b. c. 1581)
- July 18 – John Frederick, Duke of Württemberg (1608–1628) (b. 1582)
- August 6 – Johannes Junius, Mayor of Bamberg, Germany (b. 1573)
- August 20 – Sir Charles Morrison, 1st Baronet, Member of the Parliament of England (b. 1587)
- August 23 – George Villiers, 1st Duke of Buckingham, English statesman (b. 1592)
- September 23 – Amalia von Hatzfeld, Swedish-Finnish governor (b. 1560)
- September 25 – Magdalene of Bavaria, Consort of Wolfgang William, Count Palatine of Neuburg (b. 1587)
- September 30 – Fulke Greville, 1st Baron Brooke, English writer (b. 1554)
- October 16 – François de Malherbe, French poet and critic (b. 1555)
- October 17 – John Frederick, Duke of Saxe-Weimar (b. 1600)
- November 15 – Roque Gonzales, Paraguayan missionary (b. 1576)
- November 16 – Paolo Quagliati, Italian composer (b. c. 1555)

1629

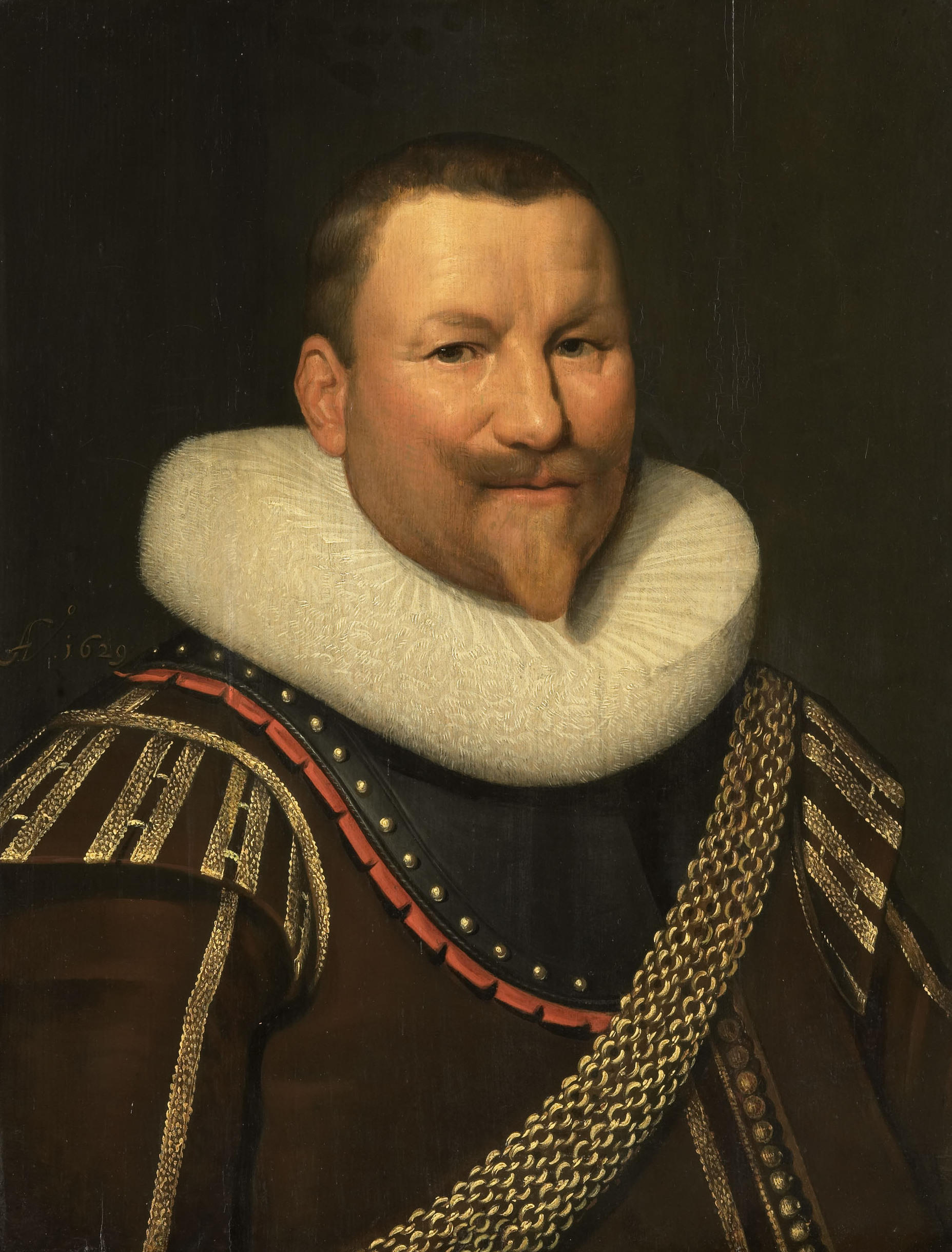
Piet Hein

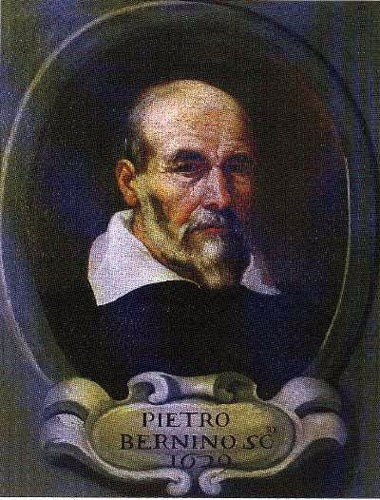
Pietro Bernini

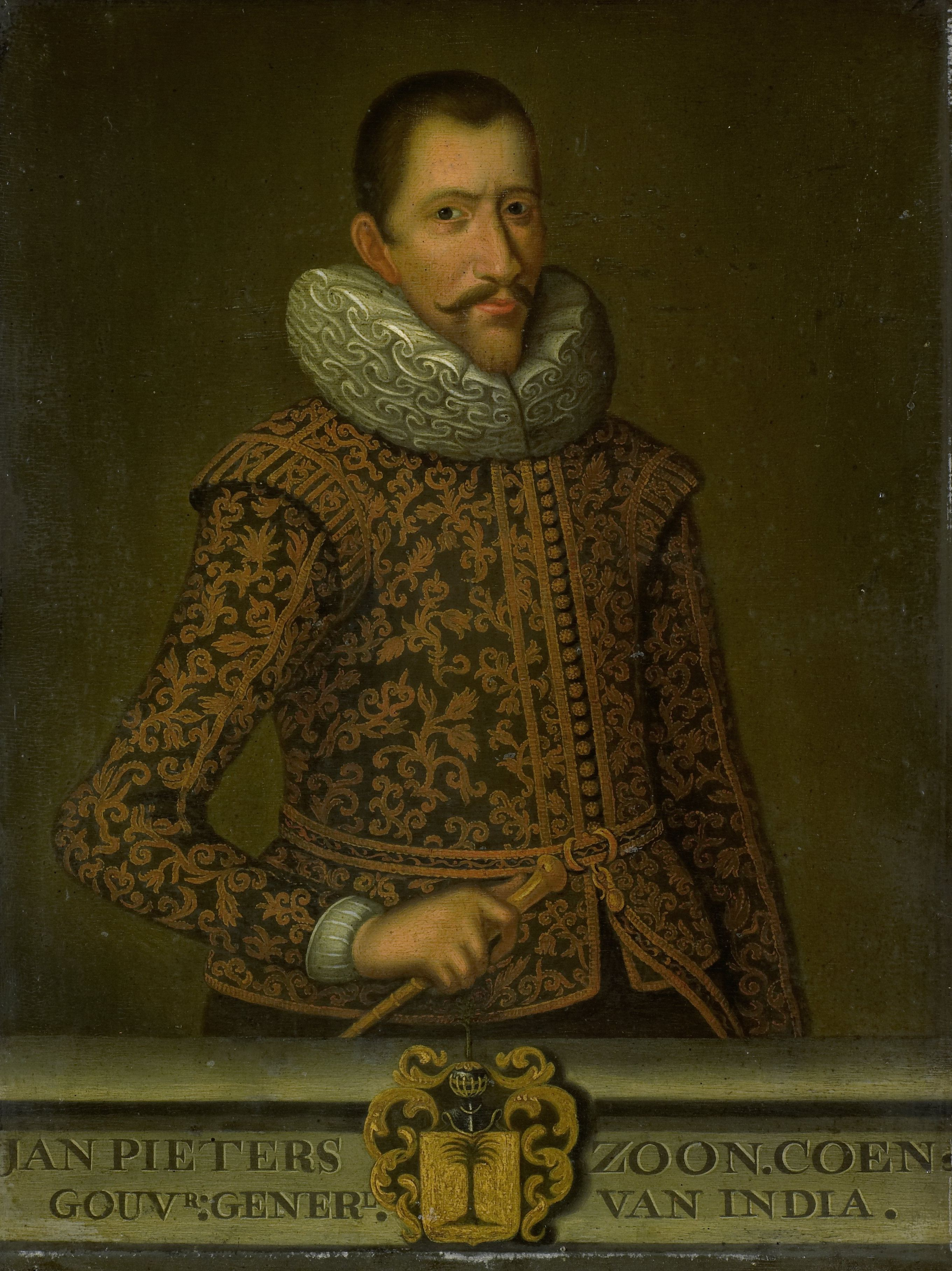
Jan Pieterszoon Coen

- January 7 – Frederick Henry, Hereditary Prince of the Palatinate (b. 1614)
- January 13 – Sri Chand, founder of the ascetic sect of Udasi (b. 1494)
- January 19 – Abbas the Great, 5th Safavid Shāh of Persia (b. 1571)
- January 23 – Andreas Schott, Flemish philologist, academic, linguist and Jesuit priest (b. 1552)
- January 27 – Hieronymus Praetorius, German composer (b. 1560)
- March 16 – Countess Emilia of Nassau, Dutch noble, daughter of William the Silent (b. 1559)
- March 23 – Francis Fane, 1st Earl of Westmorland, English politician (b. c. 1580)
- March 25 – John Guy, English merchant venturer and first Governor of Newfoundland (b. 1568)
- March 26 – Agnes of Brandenburg, Duchess of Pomerania, later Duchess of Saxe-Lauenburg (b. 1584)
- March 27 – George Carew, 1st Earl of Totnes, English noble, general and administrator (b. 1555)
- March 29 – Jacob de Gheyn II, Dutch painter and engraver (b. c. 1585)
- April 8 – Willem Teellinck, Dutch pastor (b. 1579)
- April 17 – Catherine de' Medici, Governor of Siena, Italian princess (b. 1593)
- May 5 – Szymon Szymonowic, Polish writer (b. 1558)
- May 19 – Petrus Ryff, Swiss scientist (b. 1552)
- May 30 – Thomas Schreiber, German innkeeper and alleged witch (b. c. 1598)
- June 18 – Piet Pieterszoon Hein, Dutch naval officer (b. 1577)
- July 6 – Georg Friedrich von Greiffenklau, Archbishop of Mainz (b. 1573)
- July 13 – Caspar Bartholin the Elder, Swedish physician and theologian (b. 1585)
- August 18 – Vendela Skytte, Swedish noble (b. 1608)
- August 29 – Pietro Bernini, Italian sculptor (b. 1562)
- September 11 – Herman Hugo, Dutch Jesuit priest, writer, military chaplain (b. 1588)
- September 13 – Johannes Buxtorf, German Calvinist theologian (b. 1564)
- September 21 – Jan Pieterszoon Coen, Governor-General of the Dutch East Indies (b. 1587)
- September 22 – Robert Radclyffe, 5th Earl of Sussex, English noble (b. 1573)
- October 2
  - Pierre de Bérulle, French cardinal and statesman (b. 1575)
  - Antonio Cifra, Italian composer (b. 1584)
- October 3 – Giorgi Saakadze, Georgian military commander (b. 1570)
- October 5 – Heribert Rosweyde, Dutch Jesuit hagiographer (b. 1569)
- October 13 – Petrus Bertius, Flemish theologian and scientist (b. 1565)
- November – Hendrick ter Brugghen, Dutch painter (b. c. 1558)
- November 9 – Sixtinus Amama, Dutch Reformed theologian and orientalist (b. 1593)
- December 13 – Mikołaj Oleśnicki the younger, Polish noble (b. 1558)
- December 23 – Giovanni I Cornaro, Doge of Venice (b. 1551)
- date unknown – Antonio Vassilacchi ("Il Aliense"), Greek Venetian painter (b. 1556)
- probable – Sigismondo d'India, Italian composer (b. c. 1582)
