= 1626 =

1626 in various calendars
- Gregorian calendar: 1626; MDCXXVI
- Ab urbe condita: 2379
- Armenian calendar: 1075; ԹՎ ՌՀԵ
- Assyrian calendar: 6376
- Balinese saka calendar: 1547–1548
- Bengali calendar: 1032–1033
- Berber calendar: 2576
- English Regnal year: 1 Cha. 1 – 2 Cha. 1
- Buddhist calendar: 2170
- Burmese calendar: 988
- Byzantine calendar: 7134–7135
- Chinese calendar: 乙丑年 (Wood Ox); 4323 or 4116 — to — 丙寅年 (Fire Tiger); 4324 or 4117
- Coptic calendar: 1342–1343
- Discordian calendar: 2792
- Ethiopian calendar: 1618–1619
- Hebrew calendar: 5386–5387
- Hindu calendars
- Vikram Samvat: 1682–1683
- Shaka Samvat: 1547–1548
- Kali Yuga: 4726–4727
- Holocene calendar: 11626
- Igbo calendar: 626–627
- Iranian calendar: 1004–1005
- Islamic calendar: 1035–1036
- Japanese calendar: Kan'ei 3 (寛永３年)
- Javanese calendar: 1547–1548
- Julian calendar: Gregorian minus 10 days
- Korean calendar: 3959
- Minguo calendar: 286 before ROC 民前286年
- Nanakshahi calendar: 158
- Thai solar calendar: 2168–2169
- Tibetan calendar: ཤིང་མོ་གླང་ལོ་ (female Wood-Ox); 1752 or 1371 or 599 — to — མེ་ཕོ་སྟག་ལོ་ (male Fire-Tiger); 1753 or 1372 or 600

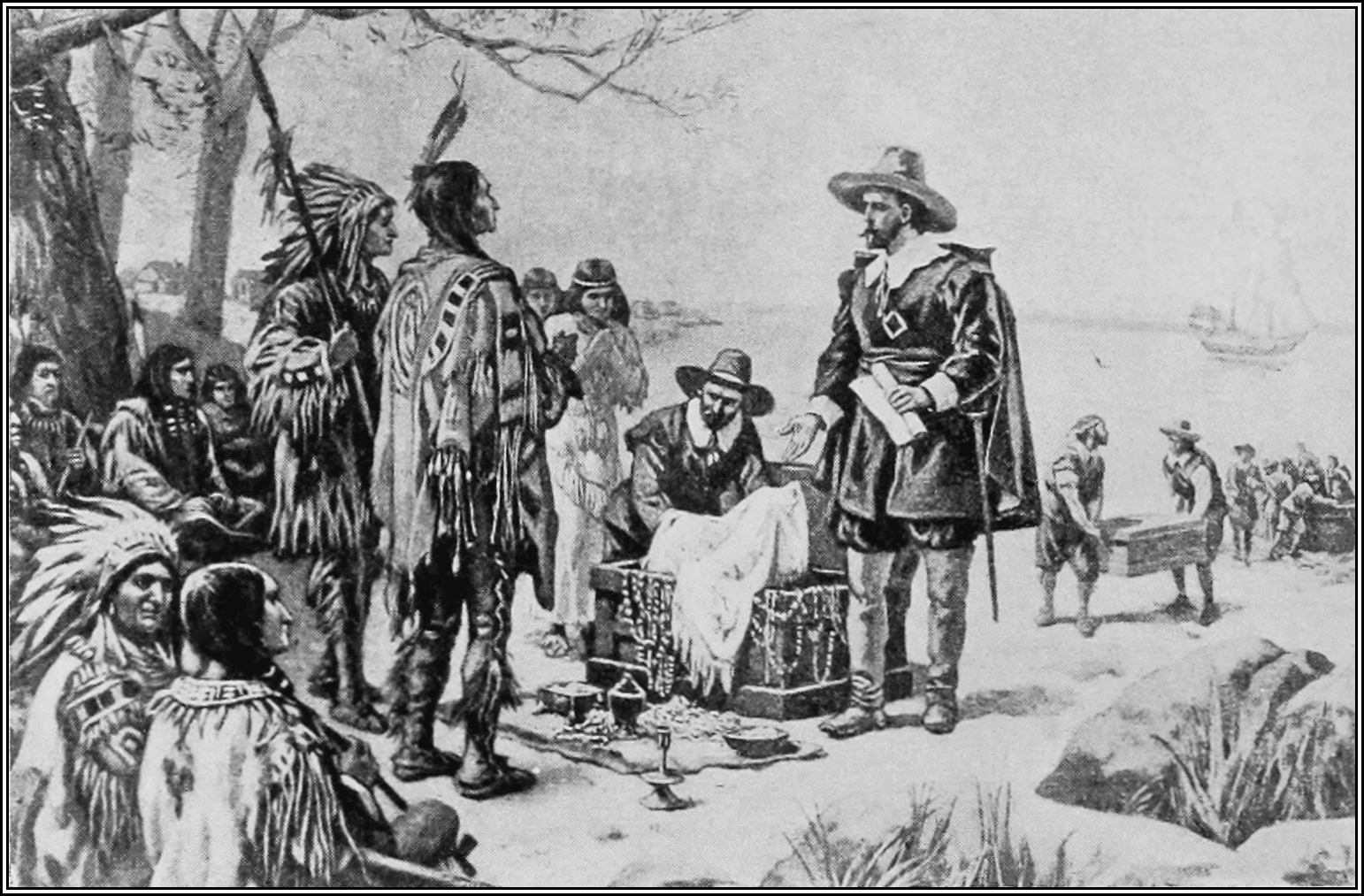
May 24: Peter Minuit, the Dutch Governor of New Netherlands, purchases Manhattan Island from the Native American occupiers.

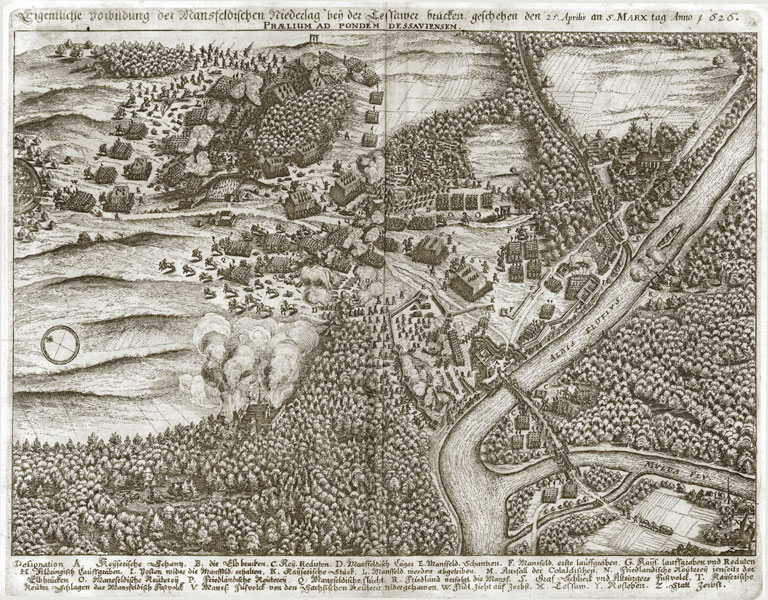
April 25: The Battle of Dessau Bridge takes place.

1626 (MDCXXVI) was a common year starting on Thursday of the Gregorian calendar and a common year starting on Sunday of the Julian calendar, the 1626th year of the Common Era (CE) and Anno Domini (AD) designations, the 626th year of the 2nd millennium, the 26th year of the 17th century, and the 7th year of the 1620s decade. As of the start of 1626, the Gregorian calendar was 10 days ahead of the Julian calendar, which remained in localized use until 1923.

== Events ==
=== January–March ===
- January 7 – Polish-Swedish War: Battle of Wallhof in Latvia – Gustavus Adolphus, King of Sweden, defeats a Polish army.
- January 9 – Peter Minuit sails from Texel Island for America's New Netherland colony, with two ships of Dutch emigrants.
- February 2 – King Charles I of England is crowned, but without his wife, Henrietta Maria, who declines to participate in a non-Catholic ceremony.
- February 5 – The Huguenot rebels and the French government sign the Treaty of Paris, ending the second Huguenot rebellion.
- February 10 – Battle of Ningyuan: In Xingcheng in China, after an 8-day battle, Ming dynasty commander Yuan Chonghuan defeats the much larger force of Manchu leader Nurhaci, who dies soon after and is succeeded by Huang Taiji.
- February 11 – Emperor Susenyos of Ethiopia and Patriarch Afonso Mendes declare the primacy of the Roman See over the Ethiopian Church, and Roman Catholicism the state religion of Ethiopia.
- March 5 – The Treaty of Monzón is signed between France and Spain to end the Valtellina War and the First Genoese-Savoyard War.
- March 7 – Ambrósio I Nimi a Nkanga becomes the new monarch of Kongo (in what is now Angola) after the overthrow of Garcia I Mvemba a Nkanga, restoring the Kwilu dynasty to power.
- March 15 – Portugal declares war on Queen Nzinga of the Kingdom of Ndongo, located in what is now Angola.
- A dam failure causes the sudden flooding of the mining city of Potosí in present-day Bolivia leading to the death of thousands and the massive release of toxic mercury into the environment.

=== April–June ===
- April 25 – Thirty Years' War: Battle of Dessau Bridge – Albrecht von Wallenstein defeats Ernst von Mansfelds army.
- May 4 – Peter Minuit becomes director-general of New Netherland, for the Dutch West India Company.
- May 24 – Peter Minuit buys Manhattan from a Native American tribe (Lenape or Shinnecock) for trade goods, valued at 60 guilders ($1,143 U.S. dollars as of 2020).
- May 30 – Wanggongchang Explosion in Beijing, China: a gunpowder factory explosion destroys part of the city and kills 20,000 people.
- June 15 – King Charles I of England dissolves the English Parliament.
- June 20 – Nine Jesuit Christian missionaries, six of them Japanese and three from Spain, are executed in Japan, followed by eight Japanese converts to Christianity on July 12.
- June 28 – A 7.0 magnitude earthquake strikes Lingqiu County, in China, killing 5,200 residents.

=== July–September ===
- July 4 – The Ottoman Army halts its attempt to retake Baghdad from the Persians, after having lost it in 1624.
- July 27 – George II becomes the new Landgrave of Hesse-Darmstadt upon the death of his father, Louis V.
- August 1 – Eighty Years' War: Ernst Casimir of Nassau-Dietz retakes Oldenzaal, forcing the Army of Flanders to withdraw from Overijssel.
- August 27 – Thirty Years' War: Battle of Lutter – Tilly defeats King Christian IV of Denmark's army.
- September 30 – Nurhaci, chief of the Jurchens and founder of the Qing dynasty, dies and is succeeded by his son Hong Taiji.

=== October–December ===
- November 6 (O.S.) – The ship Arms of Amsterdam arrives in Europe from New Netherland (left September 23) with the news: "They have purchased the Island Manhattes [Manhattan] from the Indians for the value of 60 guilders."
- November 18 – The new St Peter's Basilica in the Vatican is consecrated, on the 1,300th anniversary of the previous church in 326.
- December 1 – Pasha Muhammad ibn Farukh, tyrannical Governor of Jerusalem, is forced out.
- December 20 – Ferdinand II, Holy Roman Emperor and Transylvanian monarch Bethlen Gabor sign the Peace of Pressburg.

=== Date unknown ===
- 1626 influenza pandemic begins in Asia, then spreads into Europe, Africa, North America, and South America.
- The Würzburg and Bamberg witch trials, which will lead to the mass executions of hundreds of people until 1630/31, begin.
- Samuel de Champlain decides to build Cap tourmente (Kap toor-mont) Farm to raise livestock to provide food for settlers in Quebec, rather than depending on supplies sent from France.
- Establishment of the coastal settlement of Salem, Massachusetts.

== Births ==
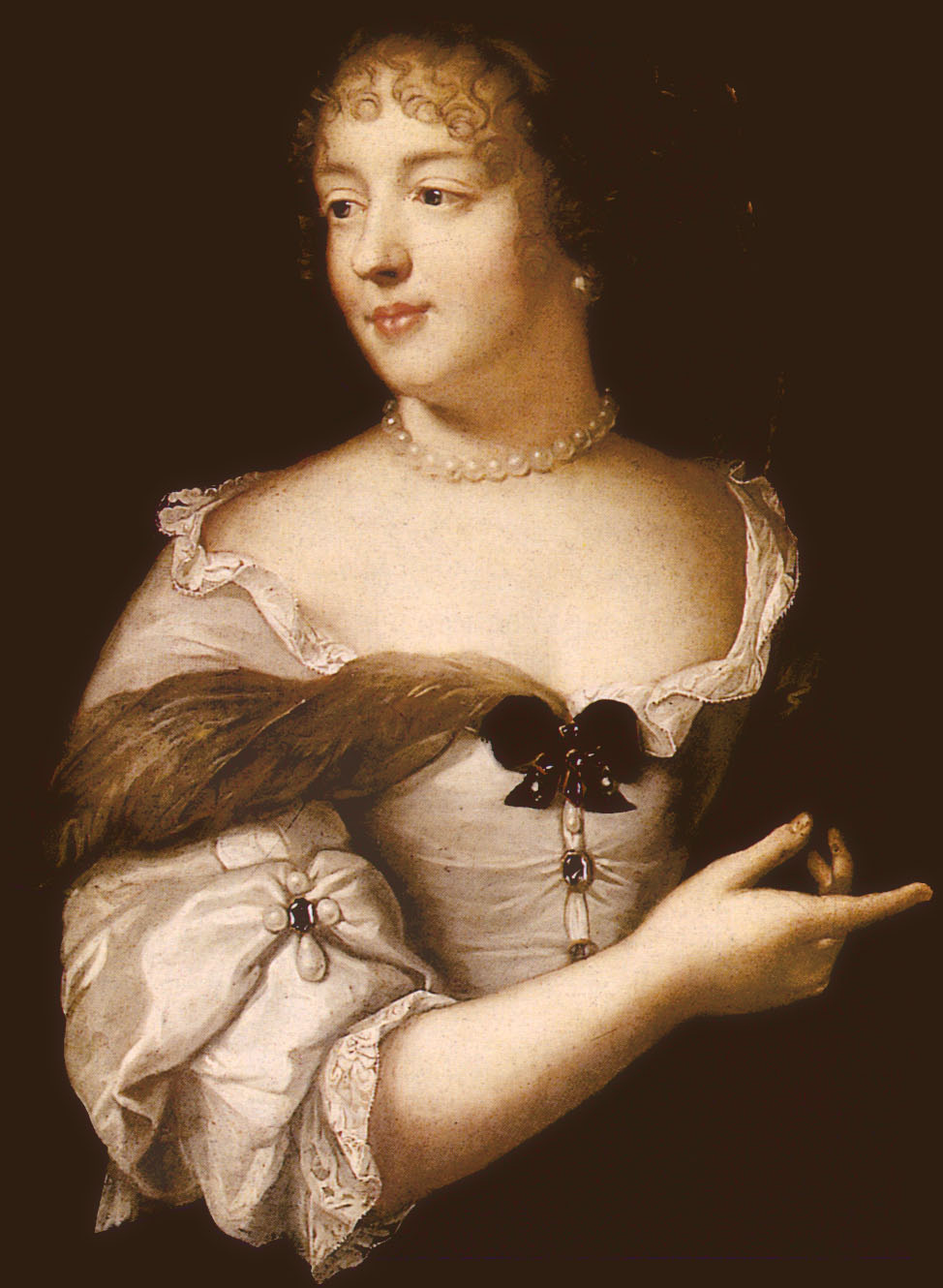
Marie de Rabutin-Chantal, marquise de Sévigné

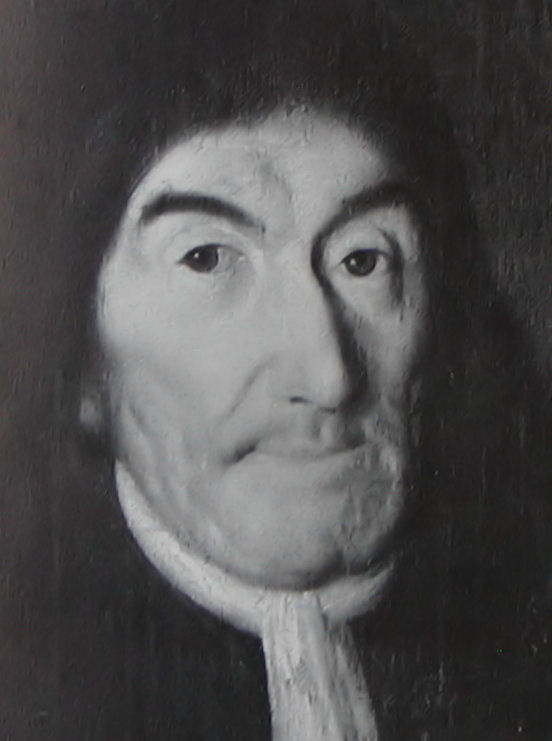
Louis Hennepin

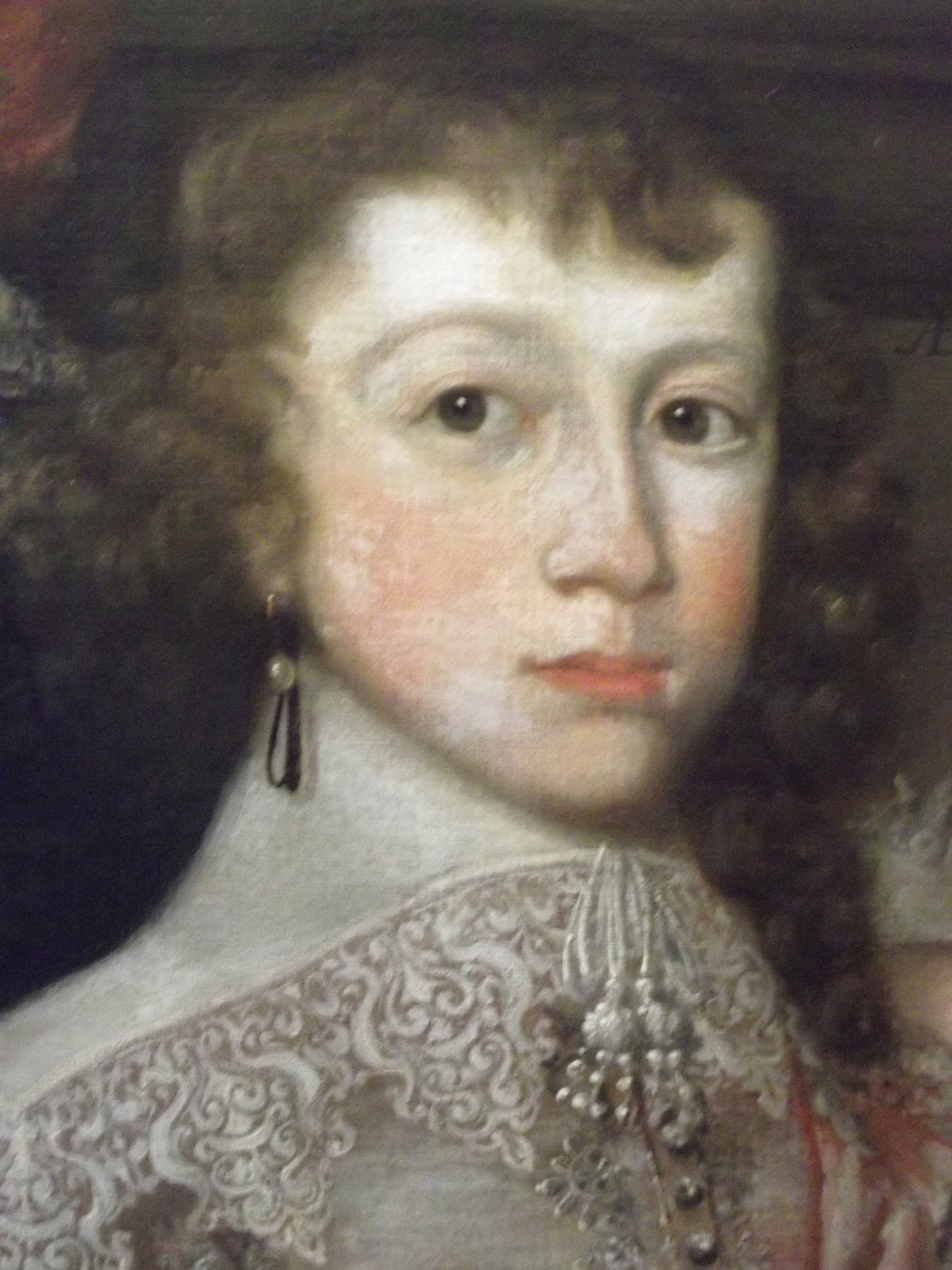
Richard Ottley

=== January–March ===
- January 9 – Armand Jean le Bouthillier de Rancé, French founder of the Trappist Order (d. 1700)
- January 13 – Johann Philipp of Hanau-Lichtenberg, German nobleman (d. 1669)
- January 25 – Edward Evelyn, British politician (d. 1692)
- February 5 – Marie de Rabutin-Chantal, marquise de Sévigné, French aristocrat and writer (d. 1696)
- February 7 – Fabian von Fersen, Swedish soldier and statesman (d. 1677)
- February 18 – Francesco Redi, Italian physician (d. 1697)
- March 3 – John Hele, English politician (d. 1661)
- March 9 – Lorentz Mortensen Angell, Norwegian merchant and landowner (d. 1697)
- March 10 – Cornelis Van Caukercken, Flemish engraver, printseller (d. 1680)
- March 12 – John Aubrey, English antiquary and writer (d. 1697)
- March 16 – Cornelius Van Steenwyk, American politician (d. 1684)
- March 21 – Peter of Saint Joseph Betancur, Spanish Catholic saint, missionary to Guatemala (d. 1667)
- March 30 – Atto Melani, Italian opera singer (d. 1714)

=== April–June ===
- April 16 – Robert Harley, English politician (d. 1673)
- April 10 – Franz Egon of Fürstenberg, German count in the Holy Roman Empire (d. 1682)
- April 23 – Maurice Henry, Prince of Nassau-Hadamar (1653–1679) (d. 1679)
- April 25 – Sigmund von Birken, German Baroque poet (d. 1681)
- May 10 – Jan Jacobszoon Hinlopen, Dutch art collector and merchant (d. 1666)
- May 12 – Louis Hennepin, Roman Catholic priest, missionary of the Franciscan Recollet Order (French (d. 1704)
- May 14 – Willem Joseph van Ghent, Dutch admiral (d. 1672)
- May 16 – Andrea Carlone, Italian painter (d. 1697)
- May 17 – Countess Palatine Eleonora Catherine of Zweibrücken, sister of King Charles X of Sweden (d. 1692)
- May 21 – Wolfgang Carl Briegel, German organist and composer (d. 1712)
- May 27 – William II of Orange, Stadtholder of Holland (d. 1650)
- June 8 – William Wentworth, 2nd Earl of Strafford, member of England's House of Lords (d. 1695)
- June 9 – Sir John Newton, 2nd Baronet, English Member of Parliament (d. 1699)
- June 18 – John Mordaunt, 1st Viscount Mordaunt, English politician (d. 1675)
- June 29 – Jeffrey Daniel, English politician (d. 1681)

=== July–September ===
- July 15
  - Christiane Sehested, daughter of King Christian IV of Denmark, and his morganatic spouse Kirsten Munk (d. 1670)
  - Hedevig Ulfeldt, daughter of King Christian IV of Denmark and Kirsten Munk (d. 1678)
- July 17 – Henriette Marie of the Palatinate, German noble (d. 1651)
- August 1
  - Charles le Moyne de Longueuil et de Châteauguay, French colonist, interpreter (d. 1685)
  - Sabbatai Zevi, Sephardic Rabbi (d. 1676)
- August 5 – Richard Ottley, English politician (d. 1670)
- August 12 – Giovanni Legrenzi, Italian composer (d. 1690)
- September 7 – Maria Klara of Dietrichstein, German noblewoman (d. 1667)
- September 16 – Leopold Wilhelm of Baden-Baden, Imperial Field Marshal (d. 1671)
- September 27 – William Douglas, 2nd Lord Mordington, eldest son and heir of Sir James Douglas (d. 1671)
- September 28 – Elizabeth Maitland, Duchess of Lauderdale, influential British noblewoman (d. 1698)

=== October–December ===
- October 4 – Richard Cromwell, Lord Protector of England, Scotland, and Ireland (d. 1712)
- October 5 – George II of Württemberg-Montbéliard (1662–1699) (d. 1699)
- October 17 – Samuel Danforth, American Puritan minister, preacher, poet, astronomer, missionary (d. 1674)
- October 23 – Francis Marsh, Irish bishop (d. 1693)
- November 8
  - Matthew Marvin, Jr., Connecticut settler (d. 1712)
  - César-Pierre Richelet, French grammarian and lexicographer (d. 1698)
- November 30 – Cesare Pronti, Italian painter (d. 1708)
- December 8 – Christina, Queen of Sweden (d. 1689)
- December 10 – George Christian, Landgrave of Hesse-Homburg (1669–1671) (d. 1677)
- December 12 – Giovanni Francesco Ginetti, nephew of Cardinal Marzio Ginetti (d. 1691)
- December 18 – William Stanhope, English politician (d. 1703)
- December 20 – Veit Ludwig von Seckendorff, German statesman (d. 1692)
- December 21 – Francis Scott, 2nd Earl of Buccleuch, son of Walter Scott (d. 1651)
- December 31 – Ladislaus, Count Esterházy, Hungarian noble (d. 1652)

== Deaths ==
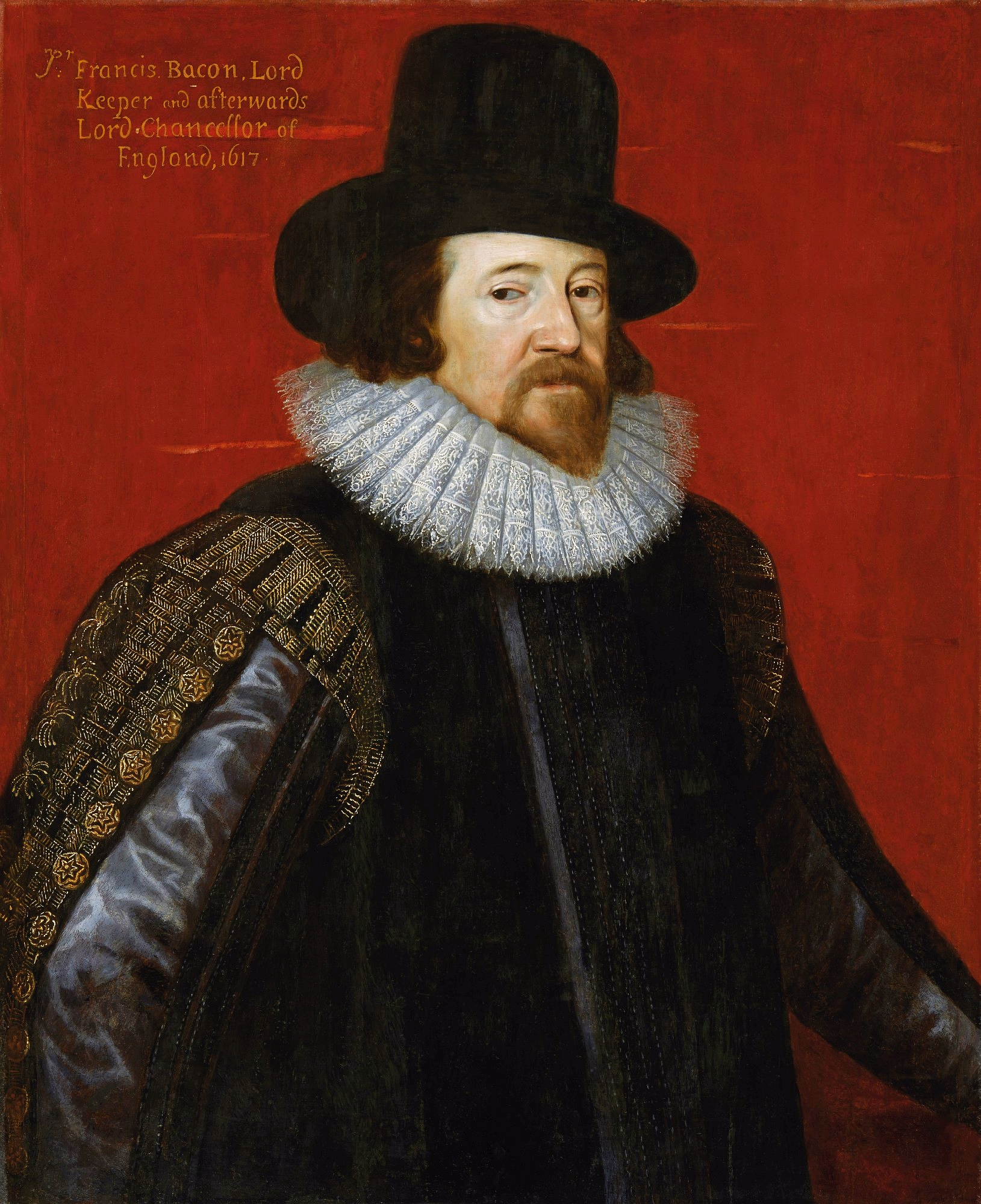
Francis Bacon died 9 April

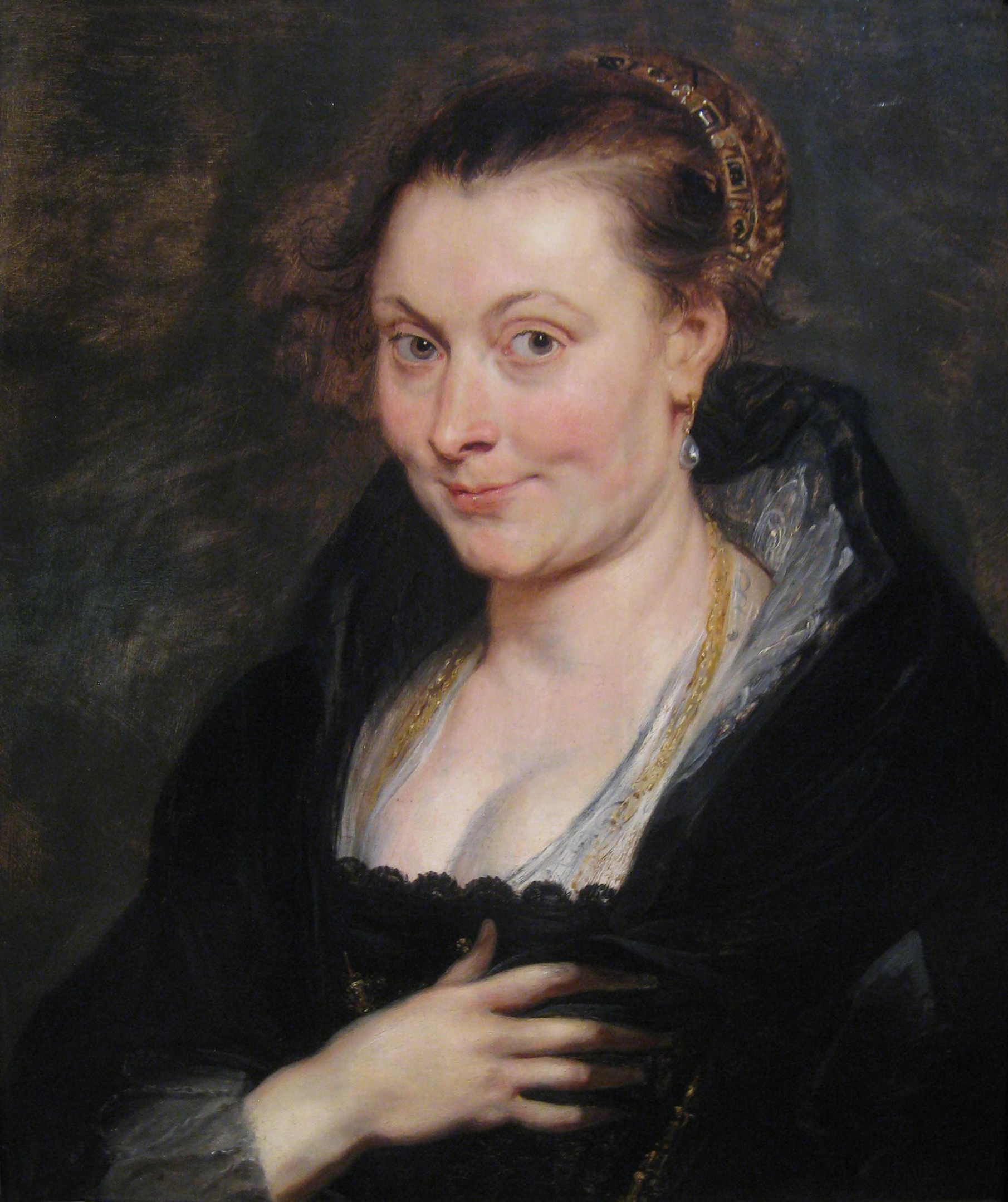
Isabella Brant died 15 July

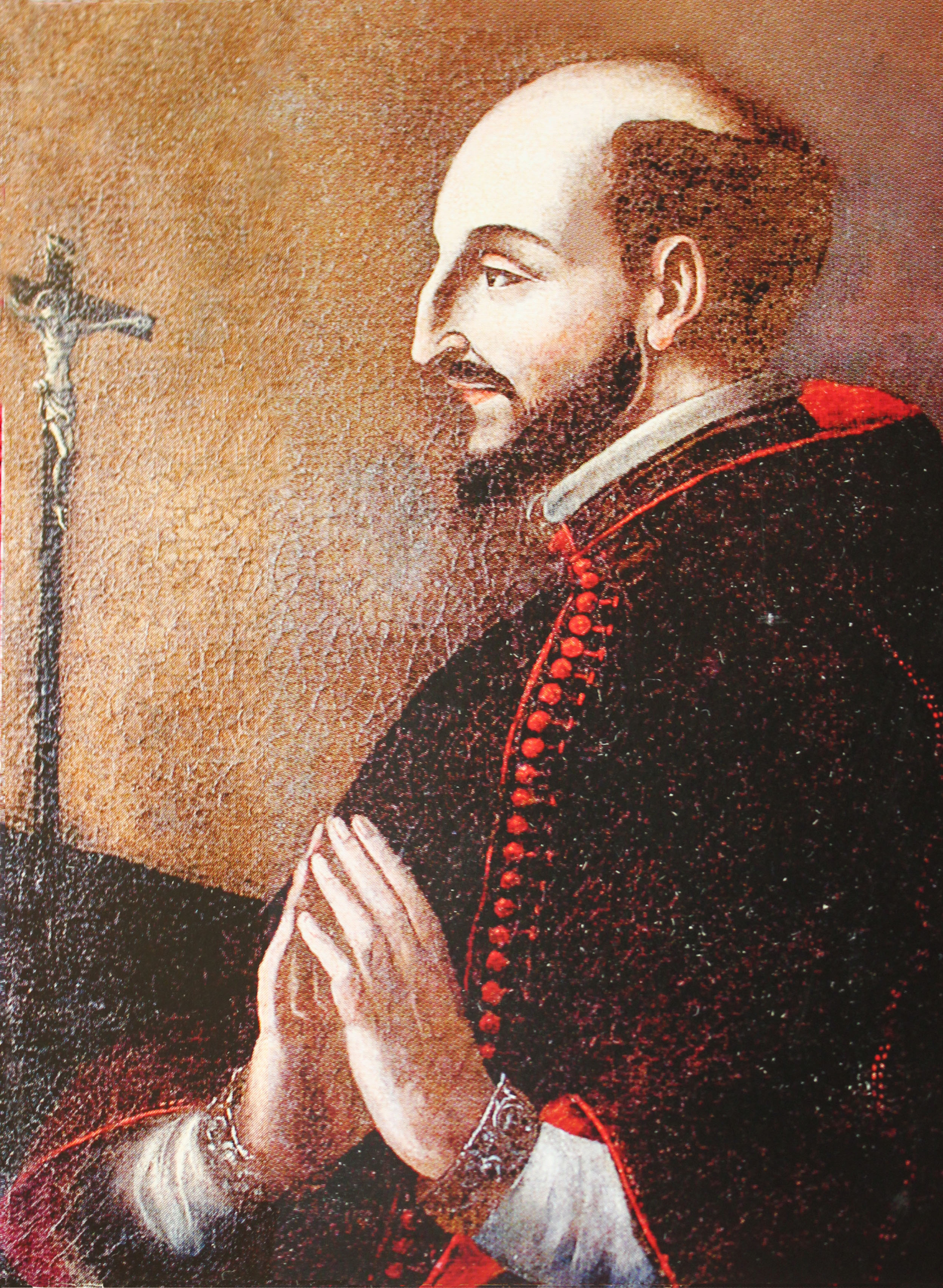
Antonio Franco (blessed) died 2 September

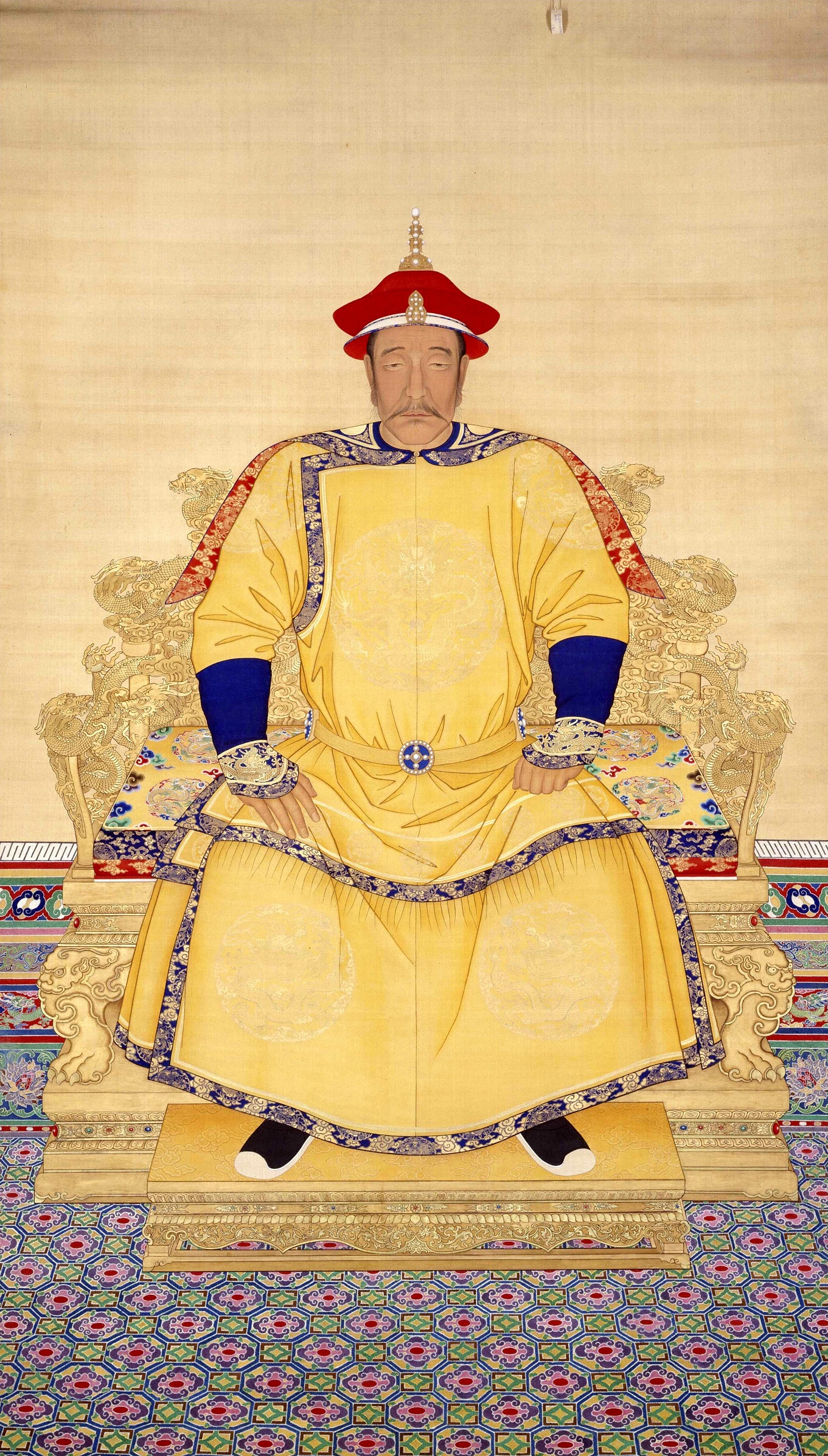
Nurhaci died 30 September

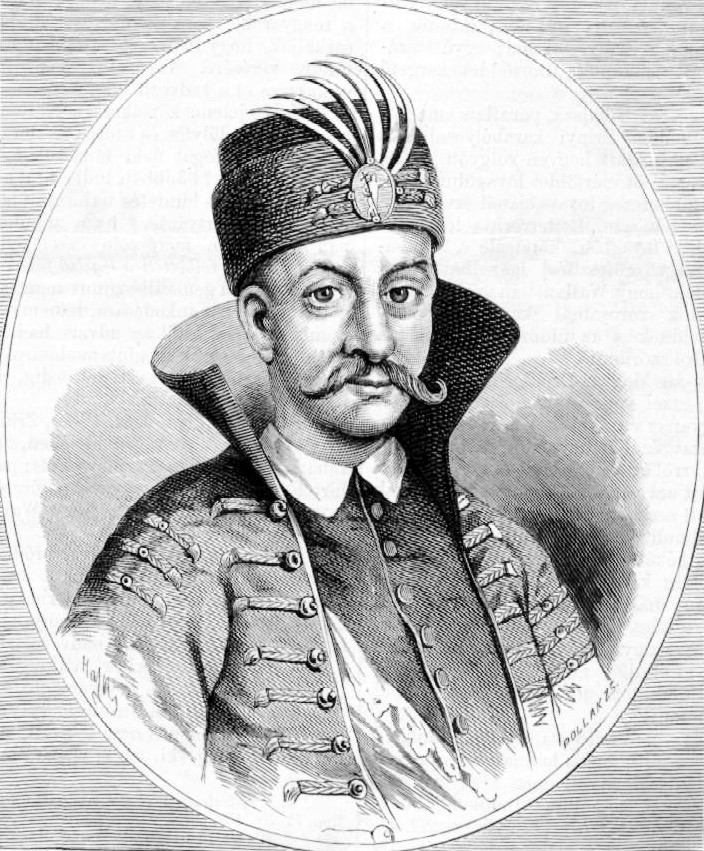
Juraj V Zrinski died 28 December

- January 2 – Maria Buynosova-Rostovskaya (b. 1590)
- January 19 – Ruqaiya Sultan Begum (b. 1542)
- January 23 – Decio Carafa, Archbishop of Naples who had previously served as papal nuncio to the Spanish Netherlands (1606–1607) and to Habsburg Spain (1607–1611) (b. 1556)
- January 24 – Samuel Argall, English adventurer and naval officer (b. 1580)
- c. January? – Patrick Galloway, Moderator of the General Assembly of the Church of Scotland (b. c. 1551)
- February 7 – William V, Duke of Bavaria (b. 1548)
- February 11 – Pietro Cataldi, Italian mathematician (b. 1552)
- February 20 – John Dowland, English composer and lutenist (b. 1563)
- February 21 – Odoardo Farnese, Italian Catholic cardinal (b. 1573)
- March 3 – William Cavendish, 1st Earl of Devonshire, England (b. 1552)
- March 10 – John Dormer, English Member of Parliament (b. 1556)
- March 19 – Pierre Coton, French Jesuit and royal confessor (b. 1564)
- April 5 – Anna Koltovskaya (b. c. 1552)
- April 9 – Francis Bacon, English scientist and statesman (b. 1561)
- April 11 – Marino Ghetaldi, Croatian mathematician and physicist (b. 1568)
- May 4 – Arthur Lake, Bishop of Bath and Wells, English bishop, Bible translator (b. 1569)
- May 17 – Joan Pau Pujol, Catalan composer (b. 1570)
- May 28 – Thomas Howard, 1st Earl of Suffolk (b. 1561)
- June 7 – Anne of Saint Bartholomew, Spanish Discalced Carmelite nun (b. 1550)
- June 16
  - Albert, Count of Nassau-Dillenburg, joint ruler of Nassau-Dillenburg 1623–1626 (b. 1596)
  - Christian, Duke of Brunswick-Lüneburg-Wolfenbüttel, German Protestant military leader (b. 1599)
- June 29 – Scipione Cobelluzzi, Italian cardinal and archivist (b. 1564)
- June 30 – Honda Tadatoki (b. 1596)
- July 13 – Robert Sidney, 1st Earl of Leicester, English statesman (b. 1563)
- July 15 – Isabella Brant, Flemish artists' model, first wife of painter Peter Paul Rubens (b. 1591)
- July 19 – Elizabeth of Denmark, Duchess of Brunswick-Wolfenbüttel, German regent (b. 1573)
- July 27 – Louis V of Hesse-Darmstadt (b. 1577)
- August 13 – Maria of Brunswick-Lüneburg, Duchess Consort of Saxe-Lauenburg (1582–1619) (b. 1566)
- August 15 – Girolamo Asteo, Roman Catholic prelate who served as Bishop of Veroli (1608–1626) (b. 1562)
- August 23 – Francesco Cereo de Mayda, Roman Catholic prelate who served as Bishop of Lavello (1621–1626) (b. 1568)
- August 25 – Alfonso Pozzi, Roman Catholic prelate who served as Bishop of Borgo San Donnino (1620–1626) (b. 1582)
- August 28 – Isabella of Savoy, Italian noble (b. 1591)
- September 2 – Antonio Franco, Italian Catholic bishop, prelate of Santa Lucia del Mela (b. 1585)
- September 16 – Denis-Simon de Marquemont, French cardinal and archbishop (b. 1572)
- September 17 – Johann Schweikhard von Kronberg, Archbishop-Elector of Mainz from 1604 to 1626 (b. 1553)
- September 21 – François de Bonne, Duke of Lesdiguières, Constable of France (b. 1543)
- September 22 – Aodh Mac Cathmhaoil, Irish Franciscan theologian and Archbishop of Armagh (b. 1571)
- September 25 – Lancelot Andrewes, English scholar (b. 1555)
- September 26 – Wakisaka Yasuharu, Japanese warrior (b. 1554)
- September 30 – Nurhaci, Chinese chieftain (b. 1559)
- October 1 – Lady Abahai (b. 1590)
- October 2 – Diego Sarmiento de Acuña, 1st Count of Gondomar, Spanish diplomat (b. 1567)
- October 10
  - William Hockmere, English politician (b. 1581)
  - Abraham Schadaeus, German music editor (b. 1566)
- October 13 – Domingo de Oña, Roman Catholic prelate, Bishop of Gaeta (1605–1626) (b. 1560)
- October 28 – Muhammad Parviz, Mughal emperor (b. 1589)
- October 29 – Ferdinando Gonzaga, Duke of Mantua, Italian Catholic cardinal (b. 1587)
- October 30 – Willebrord Snell, Dutch astronomer and mathematician (b. 1580)
- November 21 – Anna Maria of Hesse-Kassel, countess consort of Nassau-Saarbrücke (b. 1567)
- November 25 – Edward Alleyn, English actor (b. 1566)
- November 29 – Ernst von Mansfeld, German soldier (b. c. 1580)
- December 6 – John Ernest I, Duke of Saxe-Weimar, German duke (b. 1594)
- December 8 – John Davies, English poet and politician (b. 1569)
- December 10 – Edmund Gunter, English mathematician (b. 1581)
- December 28
  - Gábor Esterházy (1580–1626), Hungarian noble (b. 1580)
  - Juraj V Zrinski, Ban of Croatia (b. 1599)
