= Wanggongchang Explosion =

1626 disaster in China

Coordinates: 39.9022°N 116.3653°E

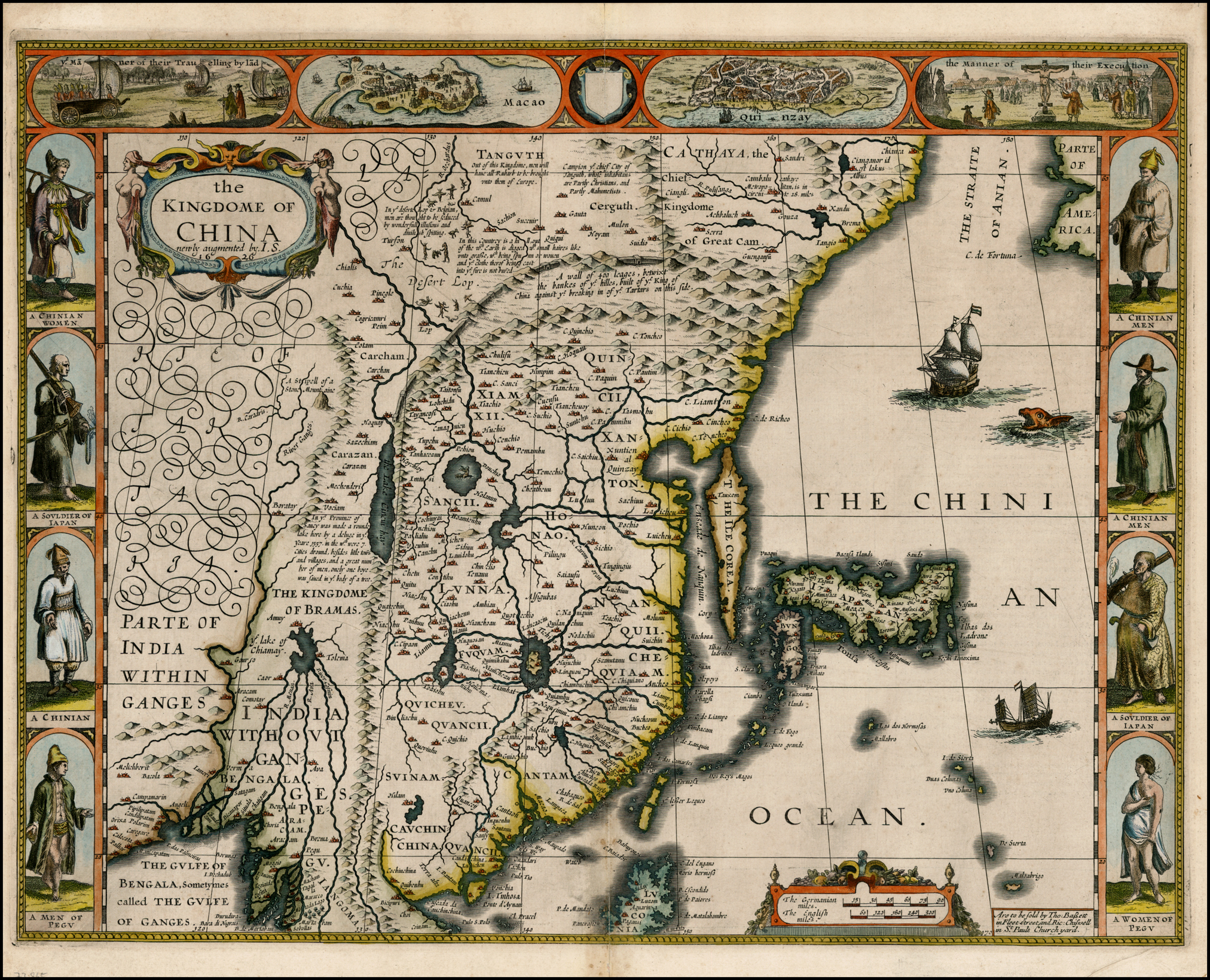
- Map of China in 1626
- Date: May 30, 1626
- Location: Beijing, Ming China
- Casualties: Possibly as many as 20,000

The Wanggongchang Explosion (Chinese: 王恭廠大爆炸), also known as the Great Tianqi Explosion (天啟大爆炸), Wanggongchang Calamity (王恭廠之變) or Beijing Explosive Incident in the late Ming dynasty (晚明北京爆炸事件), was a catastrophic explosion that occurred on May 30, 1626, during the late reign of the Tianqi Emperor at the heavily populated Ming Chinese capital of Beijing, and reportedly killed around 20,000 people. The epicenter was a major production center of gunpowder, but it is uncertain exactly what triggered the explosion.

== Background ==
The Wanggongchang Armory was located about 3 kilometres (1.9 miles) southwest of the Forbidden City, in modern-day central Xicheng District. It was one of the six gunpowder factories administered by the Ministry of Works in the Beijing area, and also one of the main storage facilities of armor, firearms, bows, ammunition, and gunpowder for the Shenjiying defending the capital. It was normally staffed by 70 to 80 personnel.

== Explosion ==
The most detailed account of the explosion was from a contemporary official gazette named Official Notice of Heavenly Calamity (Chinese: 天變邸抄; pinyin: Tiānbiàn Dǐchāo). The explosion reportedly took place at Sì shi (between 9 and 11 o'clock) on the late morning of May 30, 1626. The sky was clear, but suddenly a loud "roaring" rumble was heard coming from northeast, gradually reaching southwest of the city, followed by dust clouds and shaking of houses. Then a bright streak of flash containing a "great light" followed and a huge bang that "shattered the sky and crumbled the earth" occurred, the sky turned dark, and everything within the 3–4 li (about 2 km or 1.2 miles) vicinity and a 13 square li (about 4 km^{2} or 1.5 mi^{2}) area was utterly obliterated. The streets were unrecognizable, littered with fragmented pieces and showered with falling roof tiles. The force of the explosion was so great that large trees were uprooted and found to be thrown as far as the rural Miyun on the opposite side of the city, and a 5,000-catty (about 3 metric tons) stone lion was thrown over the city wall. The noise of the blast was heard as far as Tongzhou to the east, Hexiwu to the south, and Miyun and Changping to the north, and tremblings were felt over 150 kilometres (93 mi) away in Zunhua, Xuanhua, Tianjin, Datong and Guangling. The ground around the immediate vicinity of Wanggongchang Armory, the epicenter of the explosion, had sunk over 2 zhàngs (about 6.5 m or 21 feet), but there was a notable lack of fire damage. The clouds over the epicenter were also reported to be strange: some looked like messy strands of silk, some were multi-coloured, while some "looked like a black lingzhi mushroom", rising into the sky and did not disperse until hours later.

Several government officials in the city were killed, injured or went missing during the explosion, and some were reportedly buried alive in their own homes. The Minister of Works, Dong Kewei (董可威), broke both arms and later had to retire from politics completely. The palaces in the Forbidden City were under renovation at the time, and over 2,000 workers were shaken off the roof and fell to their deaths. The Tianqi Emperor himself was having breakfast in Qianqing Palace when the explosion occurred. After the initial quake most of the palace servants panicked, so the Emperor started running to the Hall of Union, followed only by a single guard who remained calm but was later killed by a falling tile. The Tianqi Emperor's only remaining heir, the 7-month-old Crown Prince Zhu Cijiong (朱慈炅), died from the shock.

== Aftermath ==
The late Ming dynasty was already suffering domestic crisis from political corruption, factional conflicts, and repeated natural disasters (alleged by some historians to be due to the Little Ice Age) leading to peasant riots and rebellions, which also happened elsewhere globally as part of the General Crisis. However, the horror of the Wanggongchang Explosion dwarfed all of those, and the imperial courts criticized the Tianqi Emperor and believed that the incident was a punishment from Heaven as a warning to correct the sins of the emperor's personal incompetence. Tianqi Emperor was forced to publicly announce a repenting edict, and issued 20,000 taels of gold for the rescue and relief effort.

== Sociopolitical impact ==
The Wanggong Armory Explosion can be considered a pivotal event in early modern Chinese history, for multiple reasons. The destruction of the armory, one of the largest stockpiles and manufacturing facilities of firearms and ammunition, resulted in a loss of hardware that the Ming military never quite recovered from. The gold issued for the relief effort put further strain on the government budget, which was already suffering from ever increasing military expenditures in Manchuria against the Jurchen raids by Nurhaci, as well as rampant tax evasion by the upper middle class in the more affluent South. The belief that the incident was divine punishment for the personal failings of the Tianqi Emperor (who was more interested in carpentry than ruling the country) also further eroded the authority and public support towards the Ming monarchy.

The Wanggongchang Explosion also resulted in the death of the Tianqi Emperor's only surviving son, Crown Prince Zhu Cijiong, leaving him heirless. Tianqi himself died the following year, and his overambitious younger half-brother Prince Zhu Youjian inherited the throne as the Chongzhen Emperor. Chongzhen, who hated the powerful chief eunuch Wei Zhongxian, soon purged Wei and his supporters, which ironically removed a stabilizing factor within the Ming court. The factional infighting between the resurgent Donglin faction (who were previously brutally persecuted by Wei) and their various political opponents intensified during Chongzhen's reign, which, coupled with Chongzhen's own impatience and rash decisions, further accelerated the decline and eventual fall of the Ming dynasty 18 years later.

== Possible causes ==
The cause of the explosion has never been conclusively determined. Although there are multiple sources of detailed historical records, the incident happened well before the proliferation of modern science in China, and contemporary interpretations are compounded with superstitious speculations. There were also suspicions that the official account might have been exaggerated with tints of yellow journalism. Throughout the ages, various hypotheses have been put forth, including a gunpowder explosion, a meteor air burst, a natural gas explosion and even a volcanic eruption. Despite some being regarded as scientifically plausible, no academic consensus has been reached.

=== Gunpowder ===
Due to the epicenter of the disaster, the Wanggongchang Armory, being a military storage facility that "dispatches 3000 catties (about 1.8 metric tons) of gunpowder every five days", an accidental gunpowder ignition was blamed as the culprit from the very beginning. The cause has been suspected to be poor handling during manufacturing and transport, electrostatic discharges or even sabotage by Later Jin spies, and is sometimes cited as proof of the decline in the Ming government's administrative quality.

== See also ==
- 2015 Tianjin explosions
- Largest artificial non-nuclear explosions
- List of explosions
