= Palace of Earthly Tranquility =

Hall in the Forbidden City, Beijing, China

- 坤宁宫
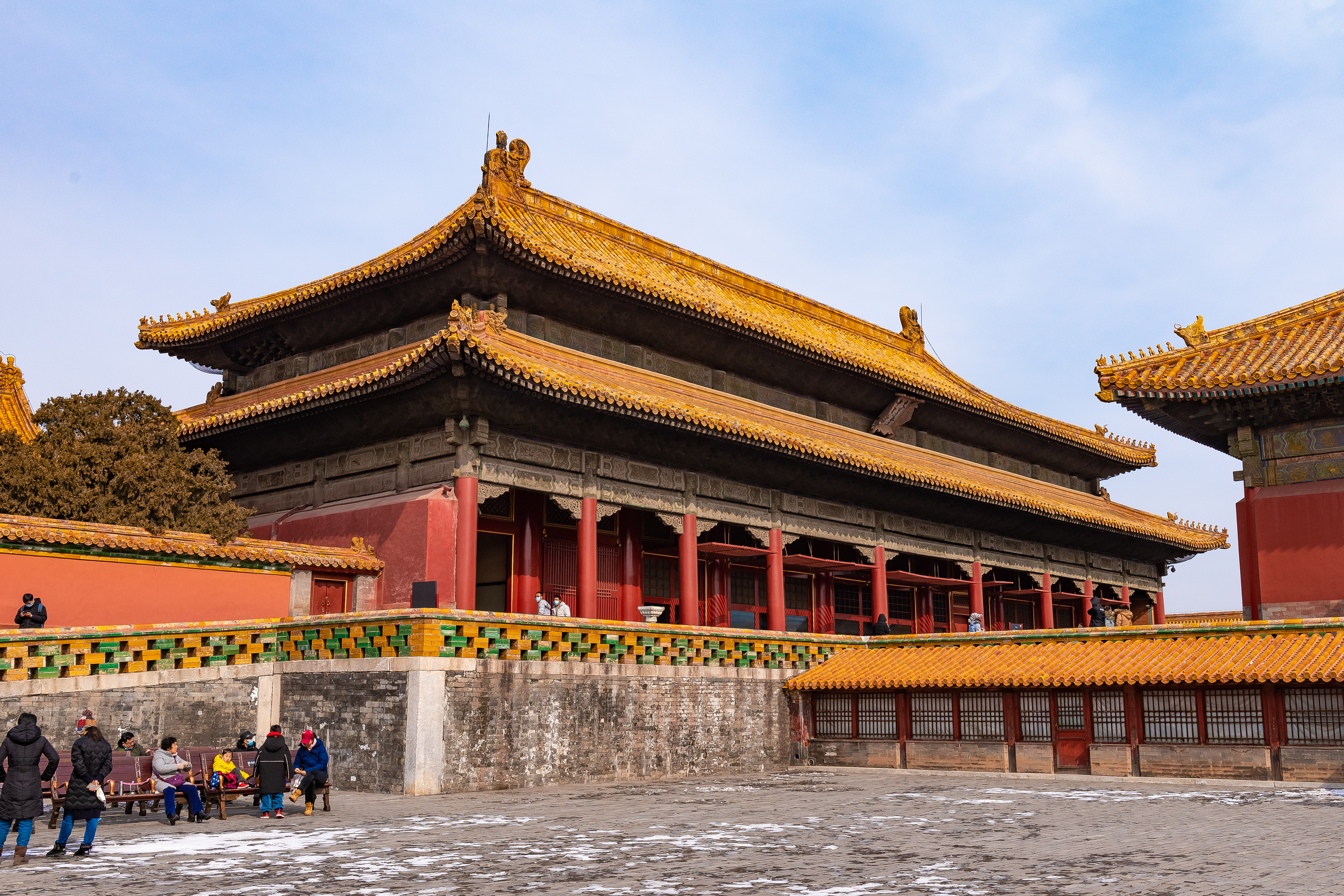
- The Palace
- Interactive map of the Palace of Earthly Tranquility area

General information
- Location: Inner Court of the Forbidden City, Beijing, China
- Coordinates: 39°55′9.8″N 116°23′25.7″E

The Palace of Earthly Tranquility (simplified Chinese: 坤宁宫; traditional Chinese: 坤寧宮; pinyin: Kūnníng Gōng; Manchu: ᡴᡠᠨ
ᠨᡳᠩ
ᡤᡠᠩ kun ning gung) is the northernmost of the three main halls of the Inner Court of the Forbidden City in Beijing, China. The other two halls are the Palace of Heavenly Purity and Hall of Union.

The color red is prominently displayed in the palace as it is the color of love, sex, and reproduction in China. The palace is where emperors traditionally had sex with their new wives soon after their wedding.

The Palace of Earthly Tranquility is a double-eaved building, nine bays wide and three bays deep. In the Ming dynasty, it was the residence of the Empress. In the Qing dynasty, large portions of the Palace were converted for Shamanist worship by the Manchu rulers. Thus, the front part of the hall featured shrines, icons, prayer mats, and a large kitchen where sacrificial meat was prepared. From the reign of the Yongzheng Emperor onwards, the Empress moved out of the Palace following the Emperor's move out of the Palace of Heavenly Purity. However, two rooms in the Palace of Earthly Harmony were retained for use on the Emperor's wedding night. The wedding ceremony would be held in the main room, and afterwards the Emperor and Empress would retire to one of these rooms.
