= Cornelis Van Caukercken =

Flemish engraver and printer

Cornelis van Caukercken (10 March 1626, Antwerp – 1680, Bruges) was a Flemish engraver and printseller.

== Work ==
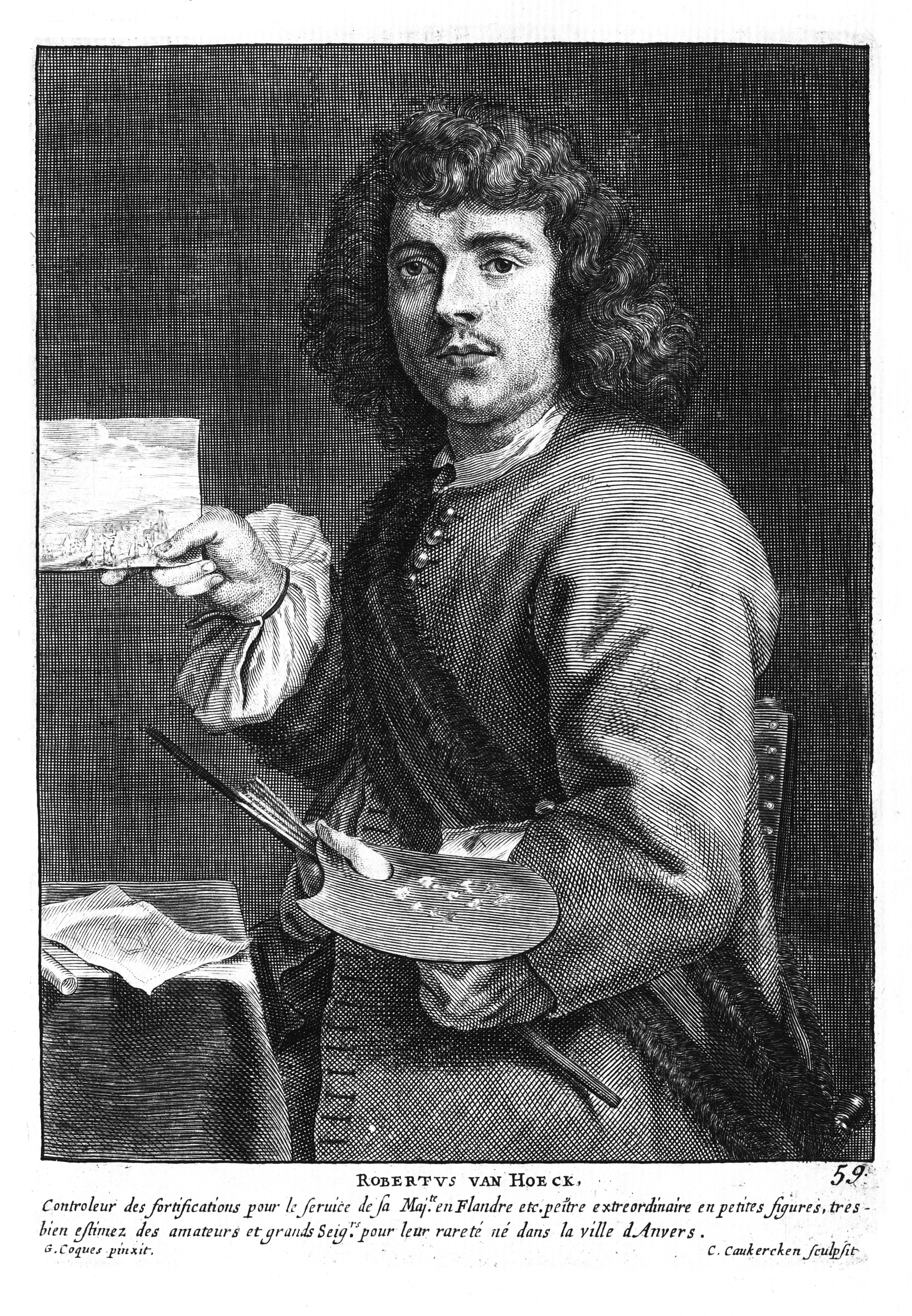
Robert van den Hoecke, from Cornelis de Bie's Het Gulden Cabinet, 1662.

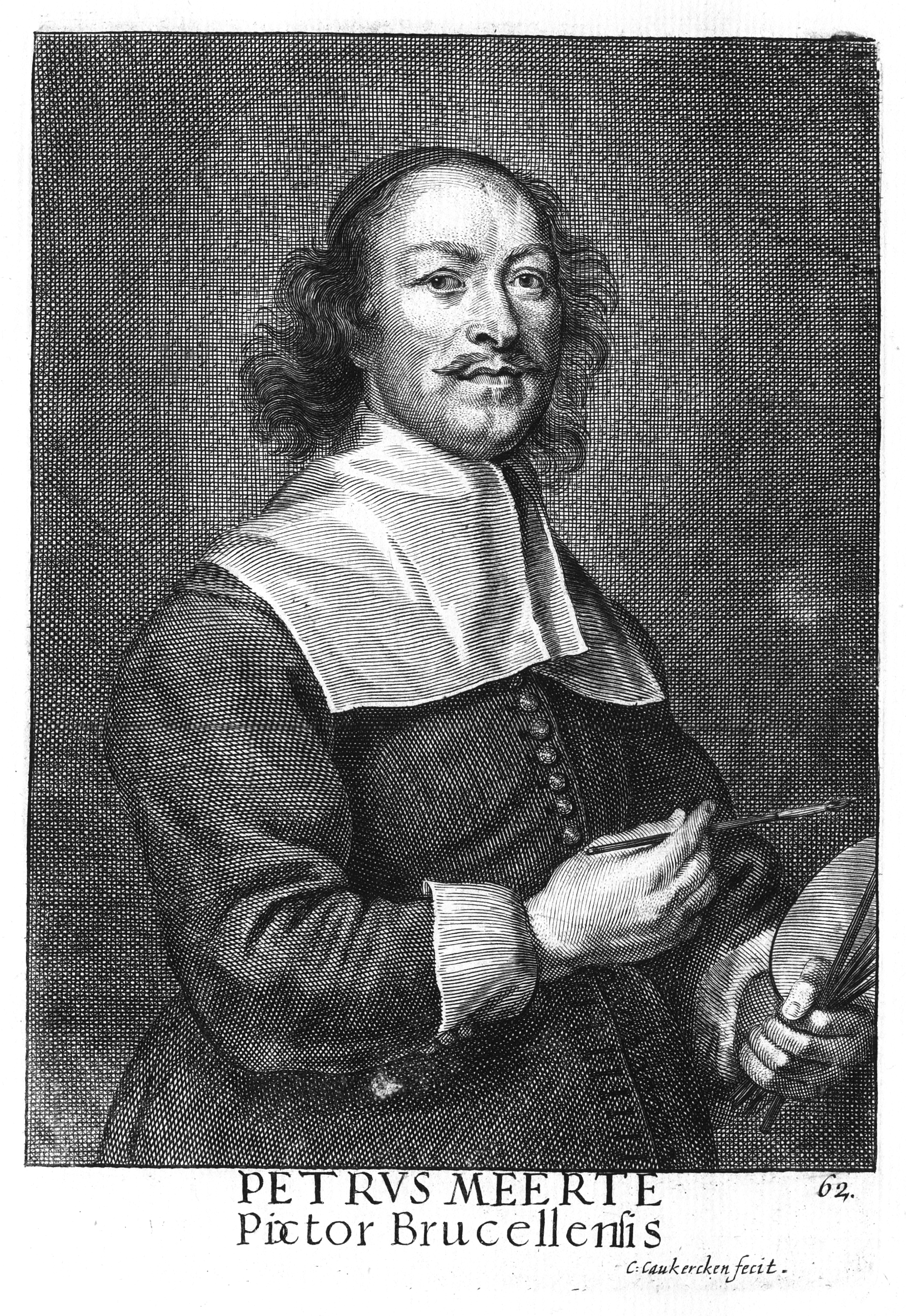
Pieter Meert, from Het Gulden Cabinet.

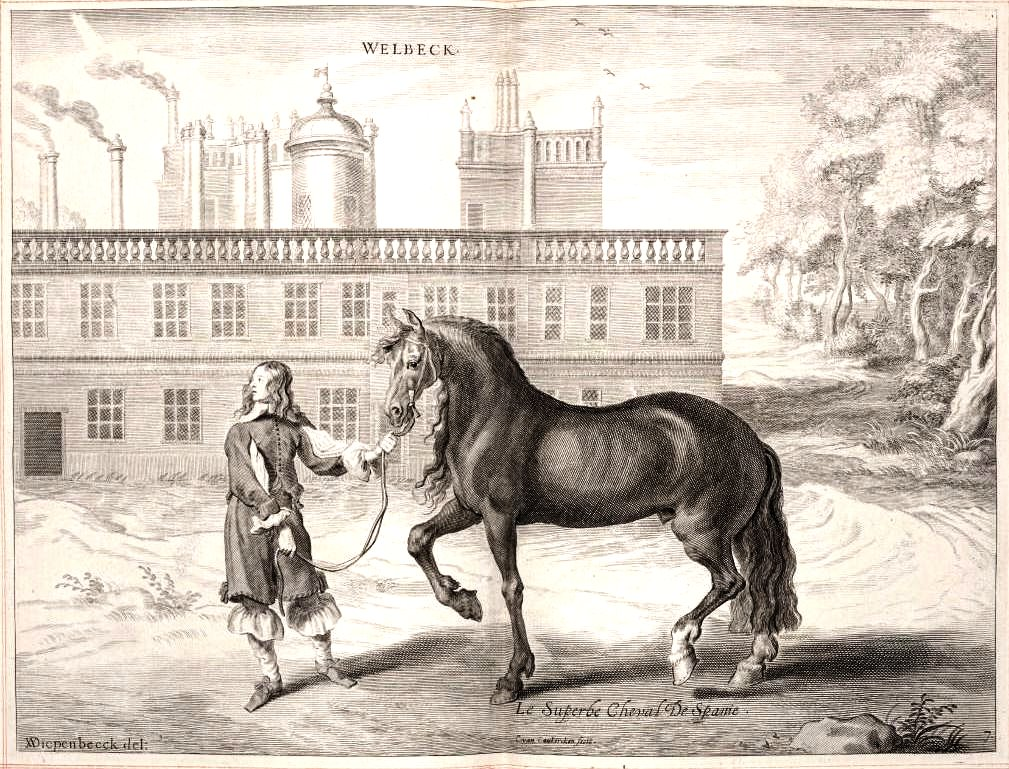
Welbeck Le Superbe Cheval de Spanie, engraving (reprinted 1743) by C. van Caukercken, after Abraham van Diepenbeeck.

He was a printseller and engraver, based in Antwerp, who made plates of portraits, and other subjects, after the works of Rubens, Van Dyck, and other Flemish painters. Writing at the end of the 18th century, Joseph Strutt said of his engravings:

He worked entirely with the graver, in a heavy laboured style, without much taste. He usually crossed his second strokes squarely upon the first, which mode requires more exquisite handling of the graver than Caukerken possessed, to render the effect agreeable."

Strutt also describes Caukerken's drawing as "defective", while conceding that "some of his best prints are not devoid of merit."

=== Portraits ===
- Peter Snayers, painter of battles after D. van Heil.
- Tobias Verhaect, painter after Otto van Veen.
- Robert van Hoeck, painter after G. Coques. (pictured)
- Peeter Meert, portrait painter after C. Caukercken. (pictured)
- Charles van den Bosch, Bishop of Bruges.
- Charles II, King of England; the figure by Caukercken, the rest by Hollar.

=== Various subjects ===
- The Dead Christ in the lap of the Virgin after Annibale Carracci.
- The Dead Christ, with the Virgin, Magdalene, and St. John after Van Dyck.
- The Descent of the Holy Ghost after Van Dyck.
- Charity, with three Children after Van Dyck.
- Roman Charity after Rubens.
- St. Anne teaching the Virgin after Rubens.
- The Martyrdom of St. Lievin after Rubens. The best impressions are those before the name of De Hollander.
- A Woman suckling an Infant; after A. Diepenbeeck.
- Boors in a Tavern; after J. Molenaer.

== Sources ==
- Cornelis van Caukercken (I) at the RKD database
