= Gate of Thriving Imperial Clan =

Gate of Forbidden City, Beijing, China

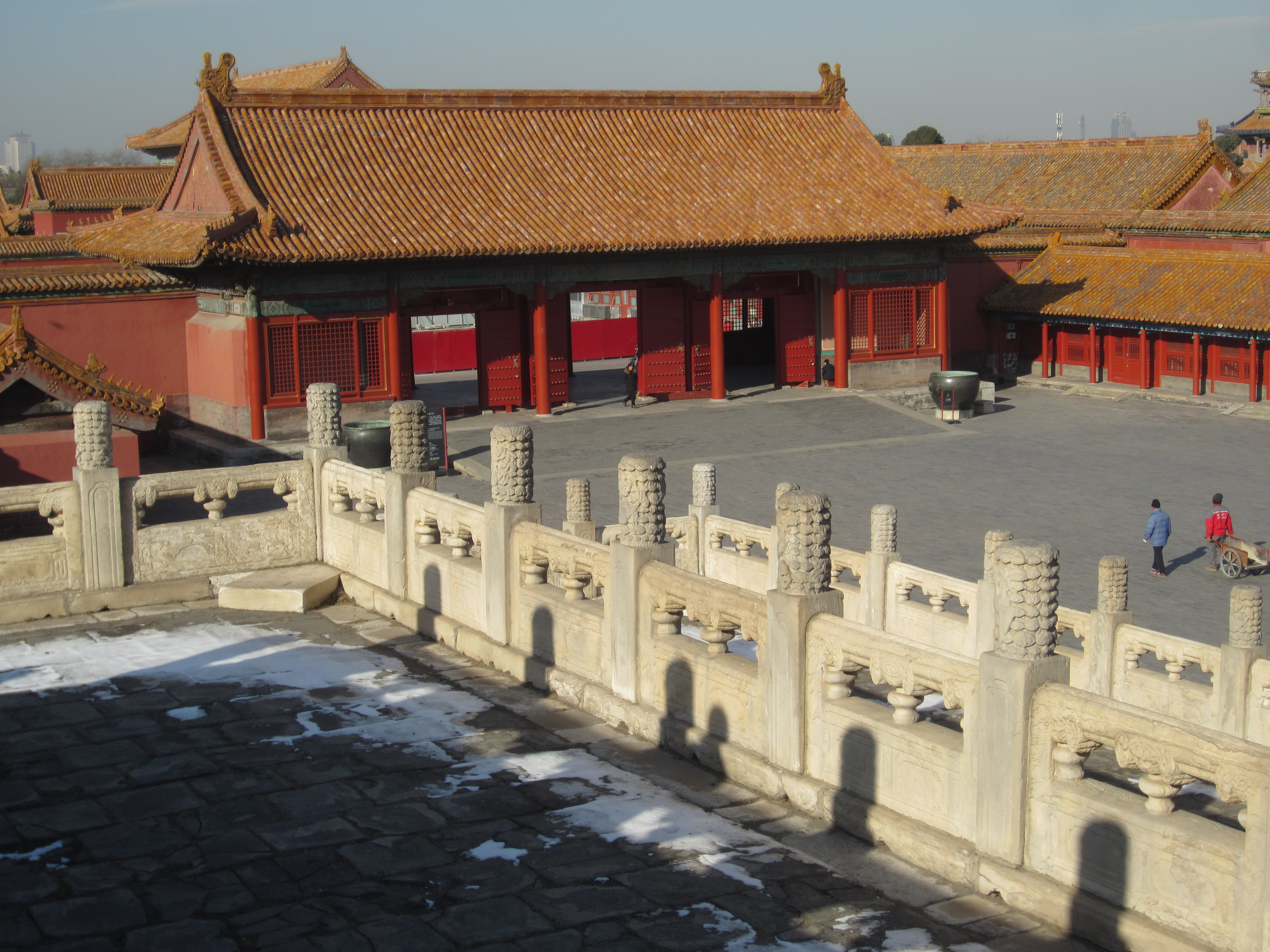
- The gate in 2016
- Interactive map of the Gate of Thriving Imperial Clan area

General information
- Type: Gate
- Location: Forbidden City, Beijing, China
- Coordinates: 39°55′07″N 116°23′45″E

The Gate of Thriving Imperial Clan (simplified Chinese: 隆宗门; traditional Chinese: 隆宗門; Manchu: ᠯᡠᠩ
ᡯᡠᠩ
ᠮᡝᠨ lung dzung men) is a gate in Beijing's Forbidden City, in China. It is located just southwest of the Gate of Heavenly Purity.
