= Gate of Heavenly Purity =

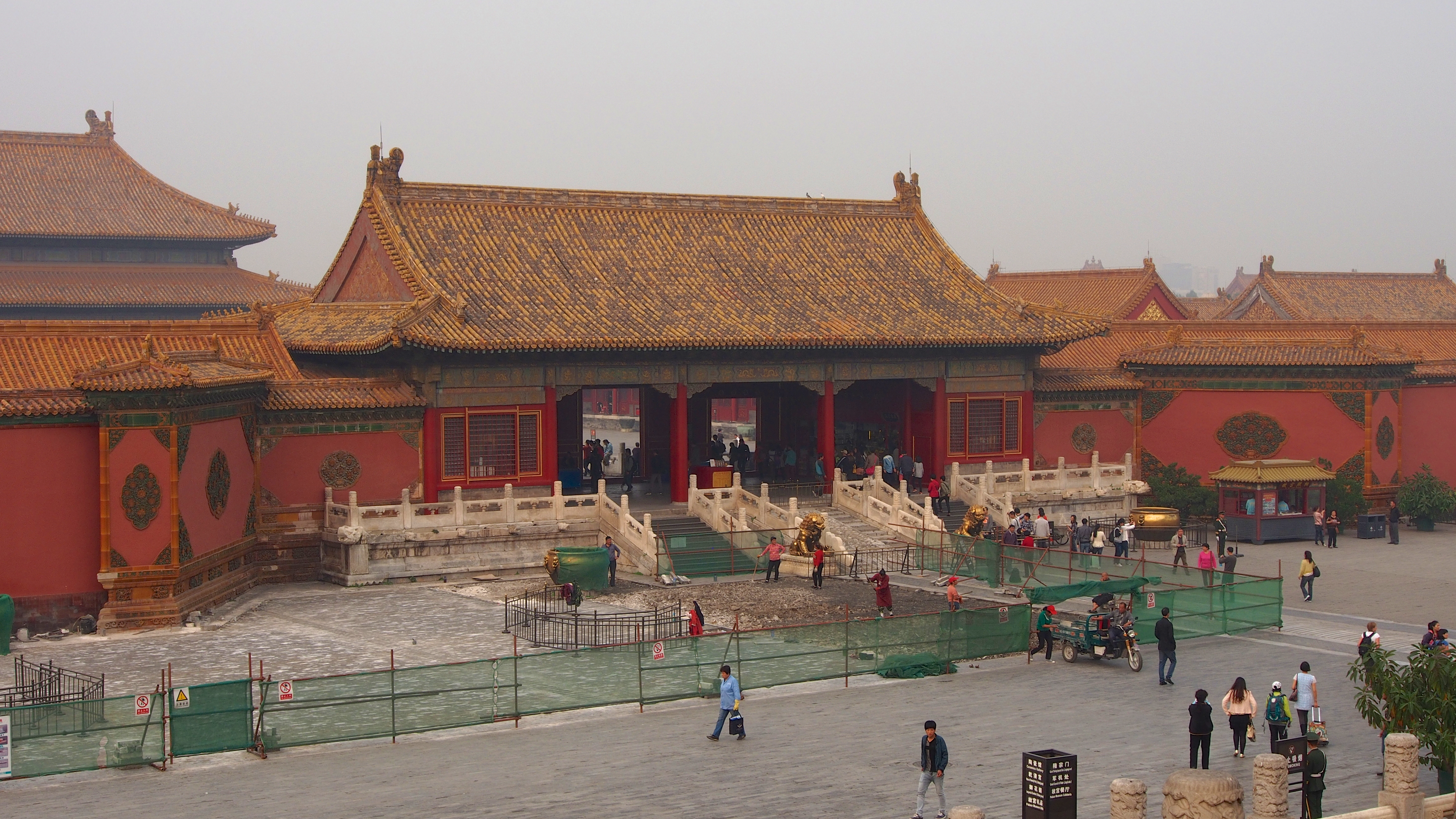
- Gate of Heavenly Purity, 2013
- Interactive map of the Gate of Heavenly Purity area

General information
- Type: Gate
- Location: Forbidden City, Beijing, China
- Coordinates: 39°55′04″N 116°23′27″E

The Gate of Heavenly Purity (simplified Chinese: 乾清门; traditional Chinese: 乾清門; Manchu: ᡴᡳᠶᠠᠨ
ᠴᡳᠩ
ᠮᡝᠨ kiyan cing men) is the main gate of the Inner Court of the Forbidden City, in Beijing, China. The gate once led people to Forbidden City's residential quarters. It is connected to the Palace of Heavenly Purity, and near the Gate of Thriving Imperial Clan.

Two gilded Chinese lion sculptures are installed outside the gate.

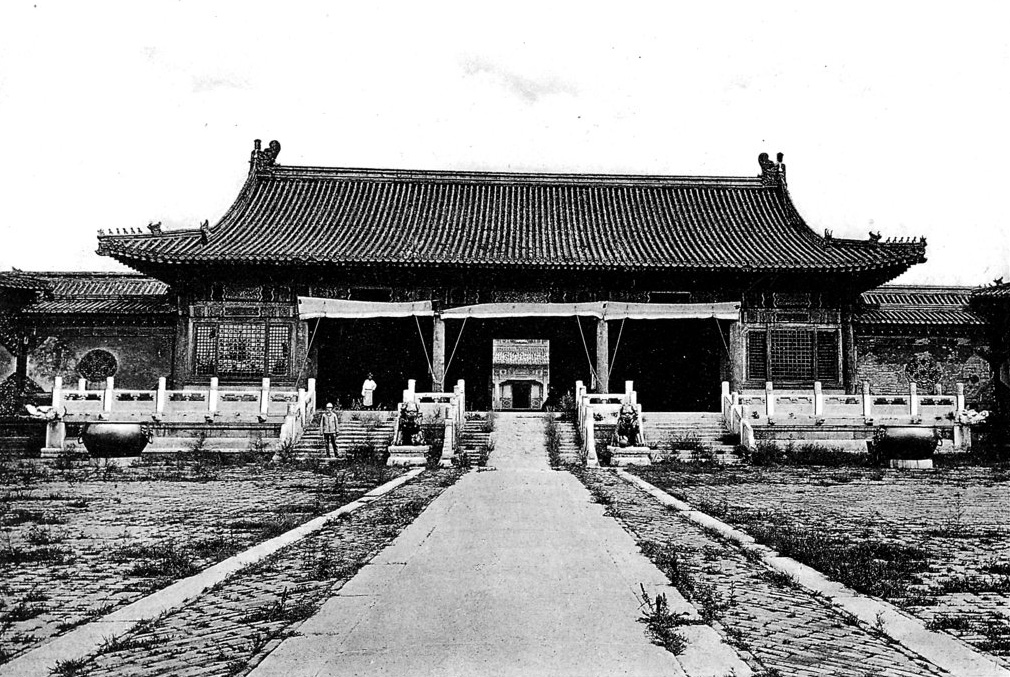
Historical image
