= 1626 influenza pandemic =

In 1626 an influenza pandemic spread from Asia to Europe, Africa, North America, and South America during the first such pandemic of the seventeenth century.

== Asia ==
Pandemic influenza yet again spread from Anatolia to Europe and Africa through the bustling, international ports of Constantinople.

== Europe ==
In Europe it started in the southern part of the continent, beginning in Italy and nations bordering the Ottoman Empire.

=== Sicily and Italian States ===
European chronicler surnamed Donius, possibly J. B. Donius, described the outbreak in Italy: "The year 1626 is recent in memory, for which winter began with a greatest influence not only in Rome but all of Italy affected together. This was strongly due to the Borcæ wind that followed the southern winds, which stirred up dangerous and corrupt illnesses that were ridiculously called Castrone." Donius, like many physicians before the discovery of pathogens, attributed the cause of the generalized outbreaks of respiratory illness to climate.

Influenza diffused throughout Italy. An epidemic hit the Spanish galleys stationed at the port of Genoa.

=== England and Ireland ===
Physicians in England were by then aware that "Colds" occurred in varying degrees, attributing most sudden respiratory illnesses to "humors" affecting the lungs.

== North and South America ==
By 1627 the flu had reached epidemic levels in North America. Flu then spread to the West Indies and South America.

== Medicine and treatment ==
Patients who were bled suffered far higher mortality rates than patients who weren't. In The Poore Mans Talent (c. 1623), a then-popular book by Thomas Lodge dispensing home remedies for common ailments, treatments include lozenges, broths, and oily, vaporous ointments for "Colds" that arises with a "general alteration and hott fevour..."
