= Abraham Schadaeus =

German music editor

Personal details
- Born: c. 1566
- Died: 10 October 1626

Abraham Schadaeus (c. 1566 – 10 October 1626) was a German music editor, best known for a three-part anthology of choral music he compiled under the title Promptuarium musicum.
