= Joan Pau Pujol =

Catalan and Spanish composer and organist

Joan Pau Pujol (Catalan pronunciation: [ʒuˈam ˈpaw puˈʒɔl]; baptized 18 June 1570 – 17 May 1626) was a Catalan composer and organist of the late Renaissance and early Baroque. While best known for his sacred music, he also wrote popular secular music.

== Life ==
Pujol was born in Mataró. In 1593 he became the assistant maestro de capilla at the cathedral in Barcelona, but he only held this post for a few months, taking the post of maestro de capilla (master of the chapel) at the cathedral in Tarragona, and then in 1595 at Nuestra Señora del Pilar in Zaragoza, a post which he kept for 17 years. While in Zaragoza, in 1600, he became a priest. In 1612 he returned to Barcelona, becoming maestro de capilla at the cathedral, a distinguished post which he held until his death. Most of his music dates from the time he was in Barcelona. Evidently a condition of his employment was to produce a fixed quantity of new liturgical music each year. Unusually for many composers of the time, most of it has survived.

Also while in Barcelona he served as an organ consultant, and helped in various organ building projects in Catalonia. He died in Barcelona.

== Music ==
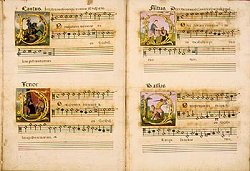
Joan Pau Pujol sheet music

Pujol wrote much of his music for the patron saint of Catalonia, St. George, and most of his compositions are based on Gregorian chant. He was a prolific composer, writing 13 masses, 8 settings of the Magnificat, 6 settings of the Nunc dimittis, 12 antiphons, 12 responsories, 9 complete settings of the Passion, litanies, lamentations, sequences, motets, hymns, and no less than 74 psalm settings. In addition he wrote 19 sacred villancicos, a form unique to the Iberian Peninsula. Surviving secular music includes romances, letrillas, liras, novenas, tonos, a folia, and 16 other works, some of which were collected in groups of madrigals of the time; they were evidently popular in Spain in the early part of the 17th century.

His missa pro defunctis—the Requiem mass—is a formal and staid setting, contrasting to the intensely emotional setting by his Spanish contemporary Tomás Luis de Victoria, who wrote his at almost exactly the same time. Its use of cantus firmus technique is conservative, and even archaic; most cantus firmus masses had been written more than a hundred years before. Yet many of his masses and psalm settings are polychoral, borrowing the style of the contemporary Venetian school; however the musical language is of the late Renaissance, rather than the early Baroque, which was then developing in Italy and Germany.

== Sources ==
- Article "Juan Pujol," in The New Grove Dictionary of Music and Musicians, ed. Stanley Sadie. 20 vol. London, Macmillan Publishers Ltd., 1980. ISBN 1-56159-174-2
- Emilio Ros-Fábregas: "Joan Pau Pujol," Grove Music Online ed. L. Macy (Accessed February 1, 2005), (subscription access)
- Gustave Reese, Music in the Renaissance. New York, W.W. Norton & Co., 1954. ISBN 0-393-09530-4
