= Palace of Heavenly Purity =

Building in Forbidden City, China

- 乾清宫
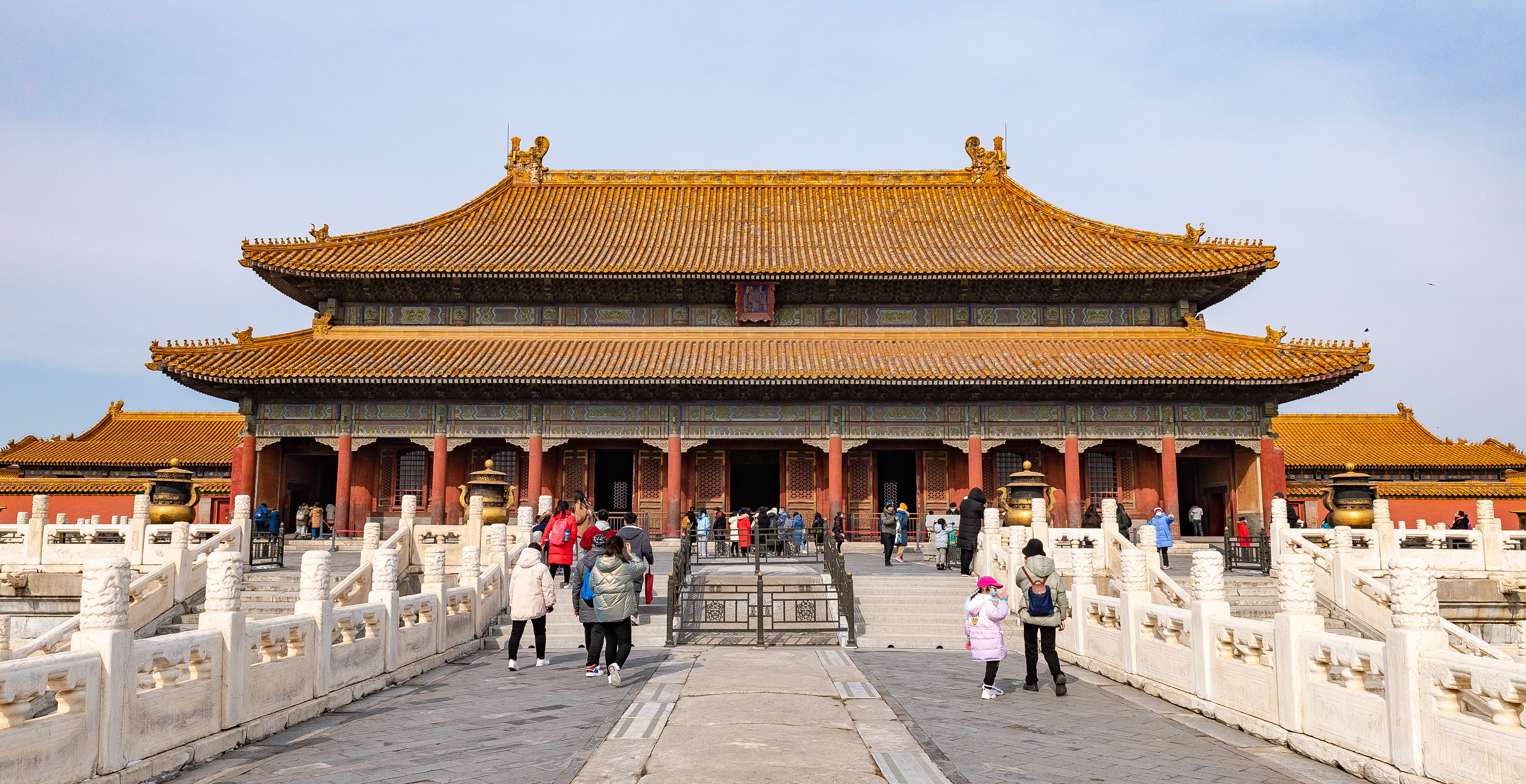
- Exterior view of the Palace of Heavenly Purity

General information
- Type: Palace
- Location: Forbidden City, Beijing, China
- Coordinates: 39°55′08″N 116°23′27″E

The Palace of Heavenly Purity, or Qianqing Palace (Chinese: 乾清宫; pinyin: qiánqīng gōng; Manchu:ᡴᡳᠶᠠᠨ
ᠴᡳᠩ
ᡤᡠᠩ; Möllendorff: kiyan cing gung) is a palace in the Forbidden City in Beijing, China. It is the largest of the three halls of the Inner Court (the other two being the Hall of Union and the Palace of Earthly Tranquility), located at the northern end of the Forbidden City. During the Qing dynasty, the palace often served as the Emperor's audience hall, where he held council with the Grand Council.

== History ==
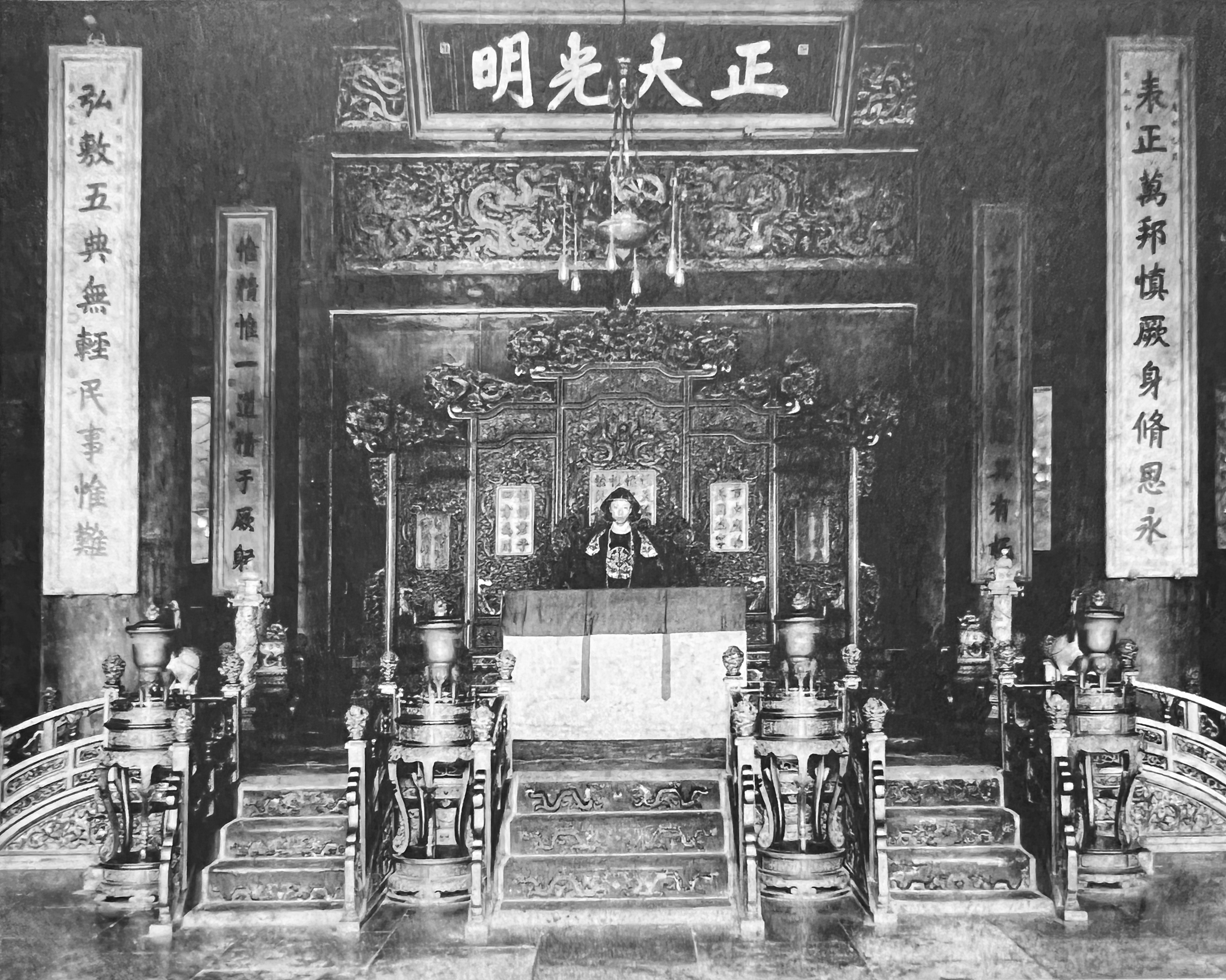
Photograph of Puyi - the last emperor of China residing within the Palace of Heavenly Purity.

Originally constructed in 1420 during the early Ming dynasty, the Palace of Heavenly Purity served as the residence of the Emperor. The large space was divided into nine rooms on two levels, with 27 beds.

For security, on any one night the Emperor would randomly choose from any of these beds. This continued through the early Qing dynasty. However, when the Yongzheng Emperor ascended the throne, he did not wish to inhabit the palace occupied by his father for 60 years. He and subsequent emperors lived instead at the smaller Hall of Mental Cultivation to the west. The Palace of Heavenly Purity then became the Emperor's audience hall, where he held court, received ministers and emissaries, and held banquets beginning in the early 18th century.

At the centre of the palace, set atop an elaborate platform, is a throne and a desk, on which the Emperor wrote notes and signed documents during councils with ministers. At the end of the Qing dynasty, the Palace of Heavenly Purity served as a place primarily for political activity.

== Architecture ==
The Palace of Heavenly Purity is a double-eaved, hipped-roof building set on a single-level white marble platform. In Chinese architecture, double-eaved hipped roofs were reserved for the most important structures. It is connected to the Gate of Heavenly Purity to its south by a raised walkway. Sitting atop the roof the palace are nine statuettes, signifying the importance of the building. The most significant building in the Forbidden City, the Hall of Supreme Harmony, has 10 statuettes. A caisson is set into the roof, featuring a coiled dragon.

Above the throne hangs a tablet with a right-to-left script reading zhèng dà guāng míng (正大光明), penned by the Shunzhi Emperor. This tablet has been translated several ways but the loose transliteral meaning is "let the righteous shine". It is often used as a Chinese idiom, meaning "to be decent, honest and magnanimous", or "to have no secret or do a shameless deed". Beginning with the Yongzheng Emperor, who himself had ascended the throne amid a succession dispute, Qing dynasty emperors had designated their heirs in secret, with one copy of the will hidden behind this tablet and another carried at all times by the Emperor himself.

Gate of Heavenly Purity and Palace of Heavenly Purity in Qianlong Emperor's era, 1750s in winter.

Visual tour of the central axis buildings of the Forbidden City, beginning from Tiananmen Gate till Gate of Divine Might (no audio).

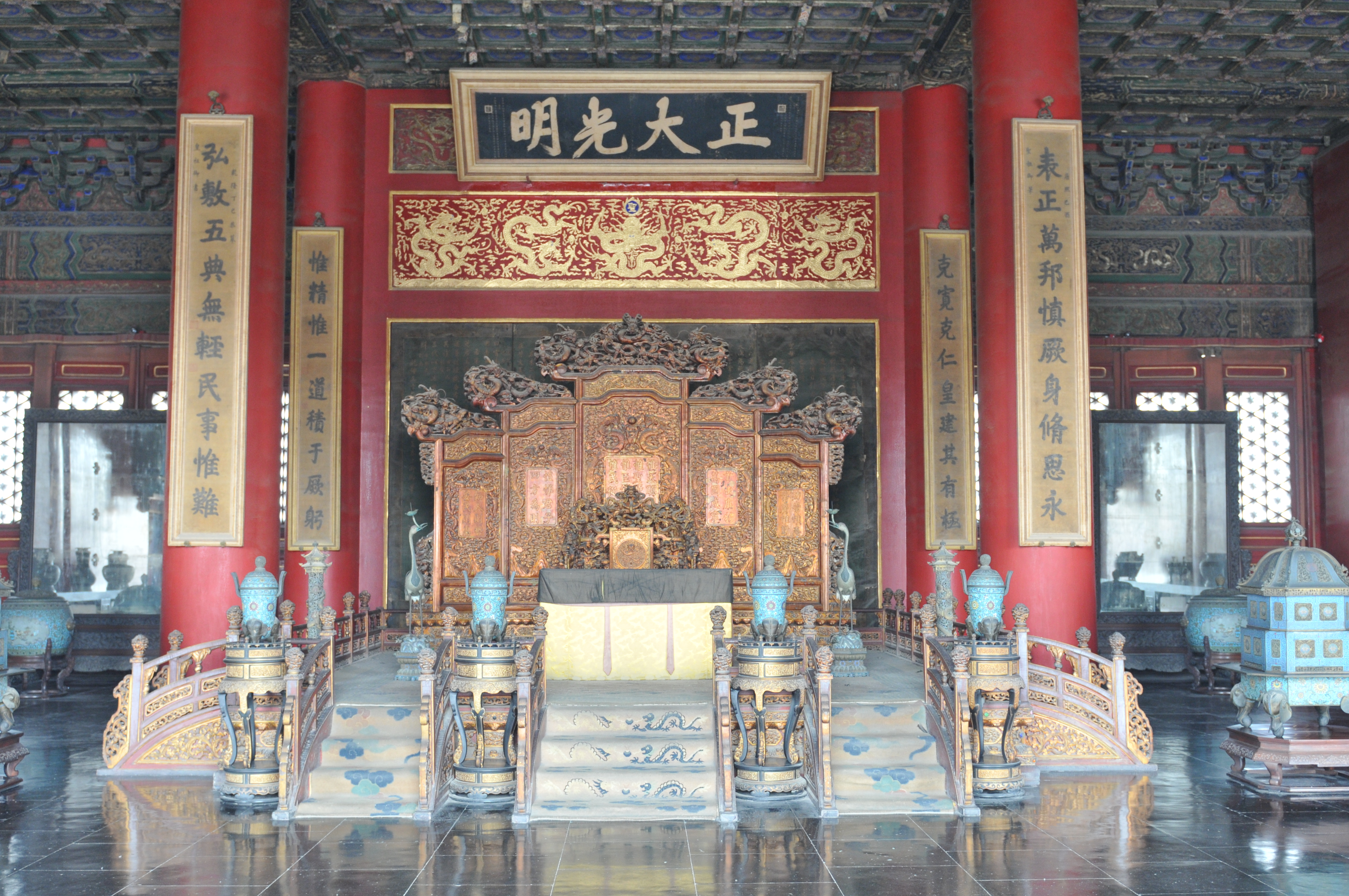
Throne in the Palace of Heavenly Purity

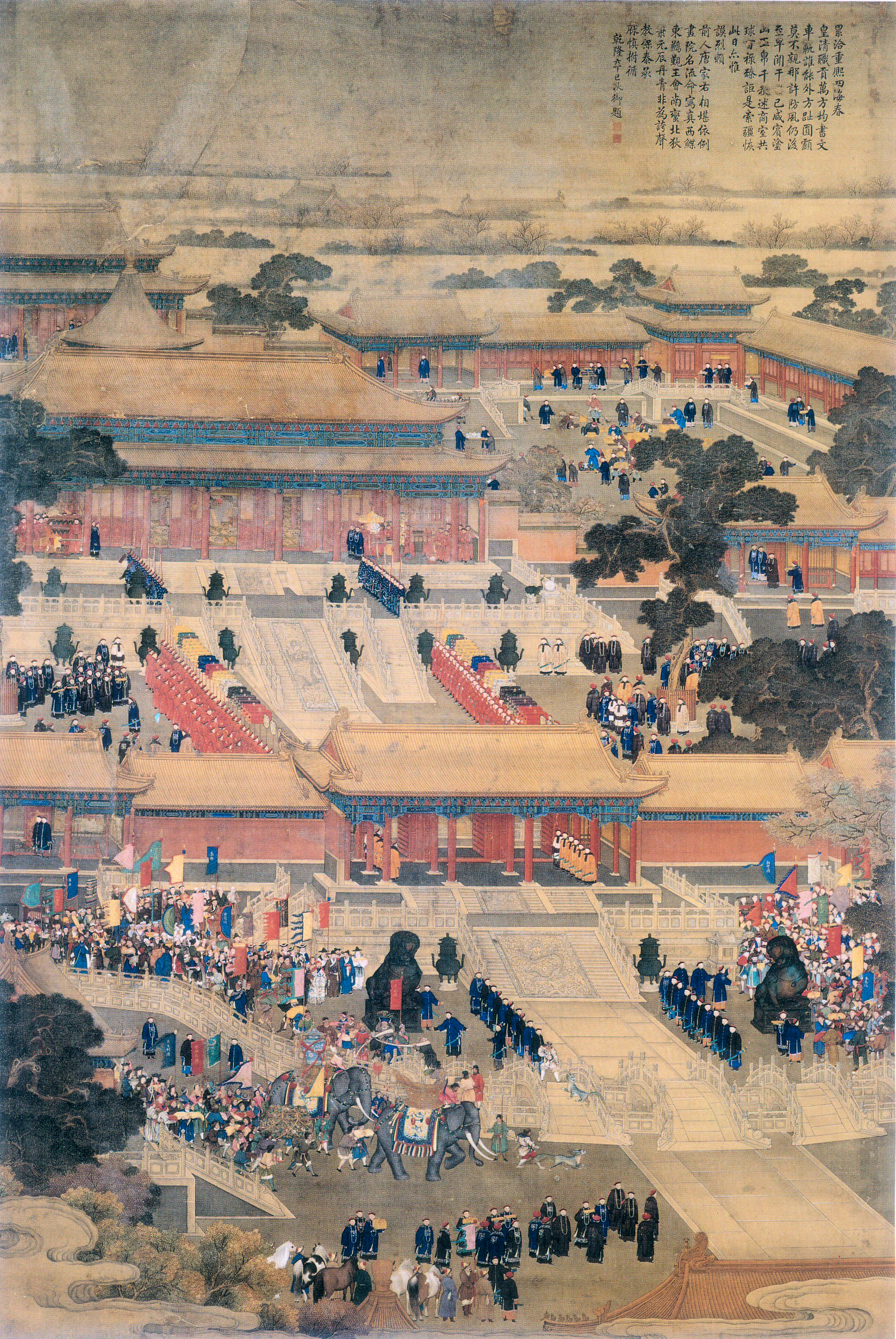
Gate of Heavenly Purity and Palace of Heavenly Purity in Qianlong Emperor's era, 1750s in summer.

== Replicas ==
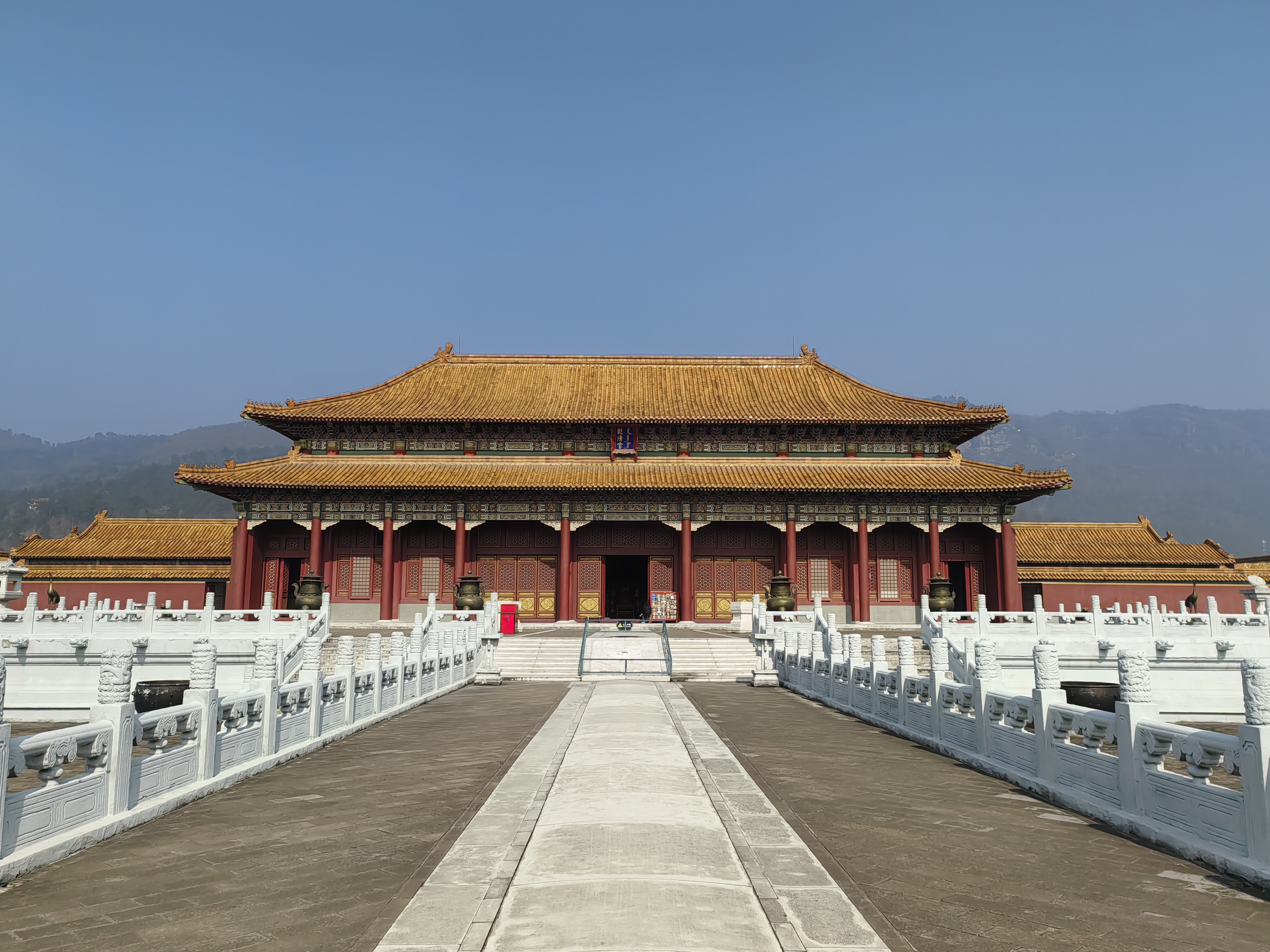
Replica of the Palace of Heavenly Purity within the Forbidden City section of the Hengdian World Studios.

A near 1:1 size replica of the Palace of Heavenly Purity, as well as the near-entirety of the Forbidden City itself, is included within the Hengdian World Studios in Dongyang Zhejiang Province - a section of which many national Chinese period-films and television shows were filmed.

== See also ==
- Palace of Earthly Tranquility
