= Hall of Union =

- 交泰殿
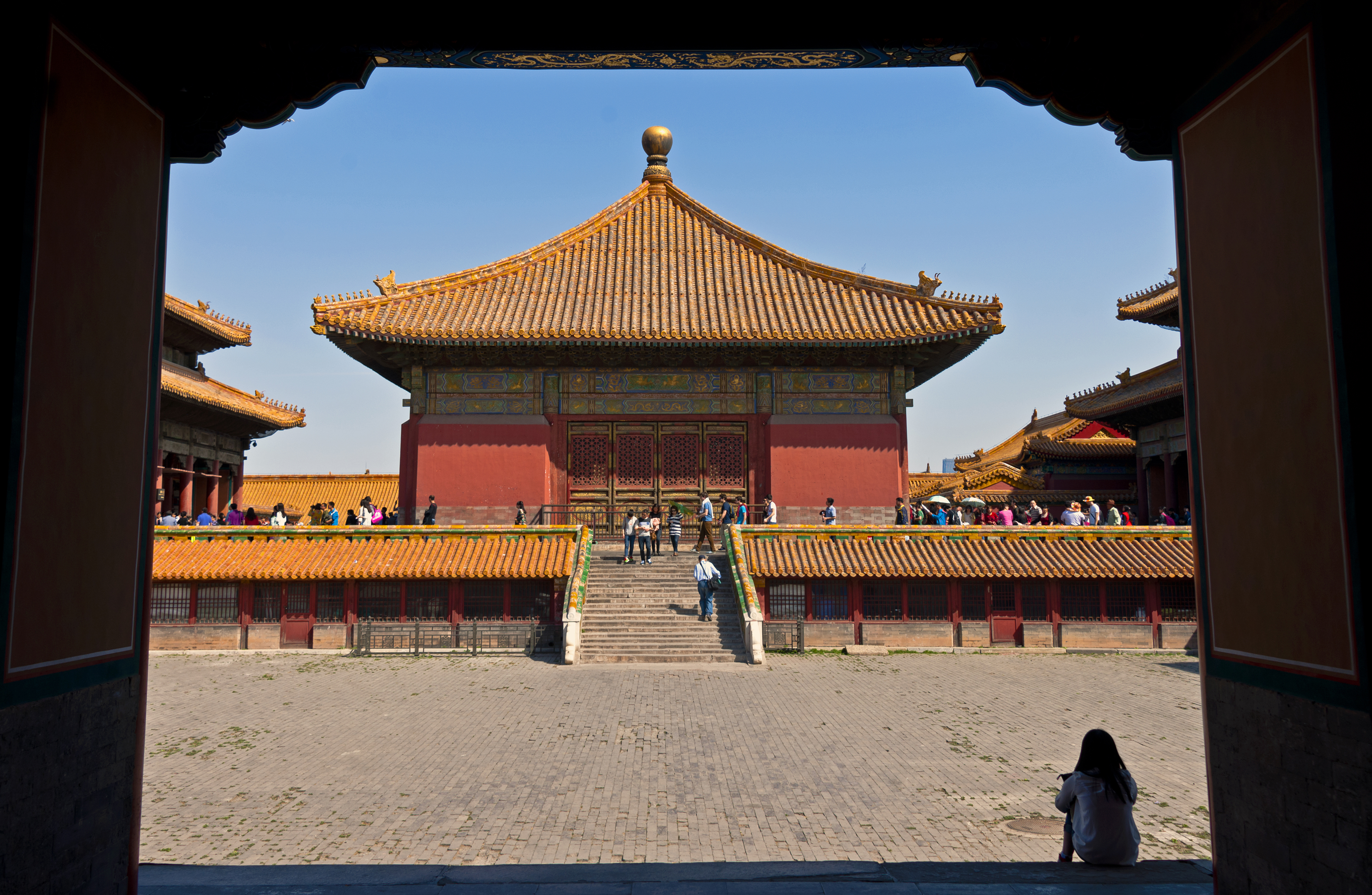
- The Hall of Union

- Location within Beijing
- Alternative names: Jiāo Tài Diàn

General information
- Type: Hall
- Location: Forbidden City, Beijing, China
- Coordinates: 39°55′8.7″N 116°23′25.8″E

The Hall of Union (Chinese: 交泰殿; pinyin: Jiāo Tài Diàn; Manchu: ᡤᡳᠶᠣᠣ
ᡨᠠᡳ
ᡩᡳᠶᠠᠨ giyoo tai diyan) is a building in the Forbidden City, in Beijing, China. It stands between the Palace of Heavenly Purity and the Palace of Earthly Tranquility. These three halls together constitute the centre of the Inner Court of the palace complex.

The hall is square in shape with a pyramidal roof. Stored here are the 25 Imperial Seals of the Qing dynasty, as well as other ceremonial items, including the clocks that set the official time in the palace (first a water clock, later a mechanical clock, both still displayed in the hall.

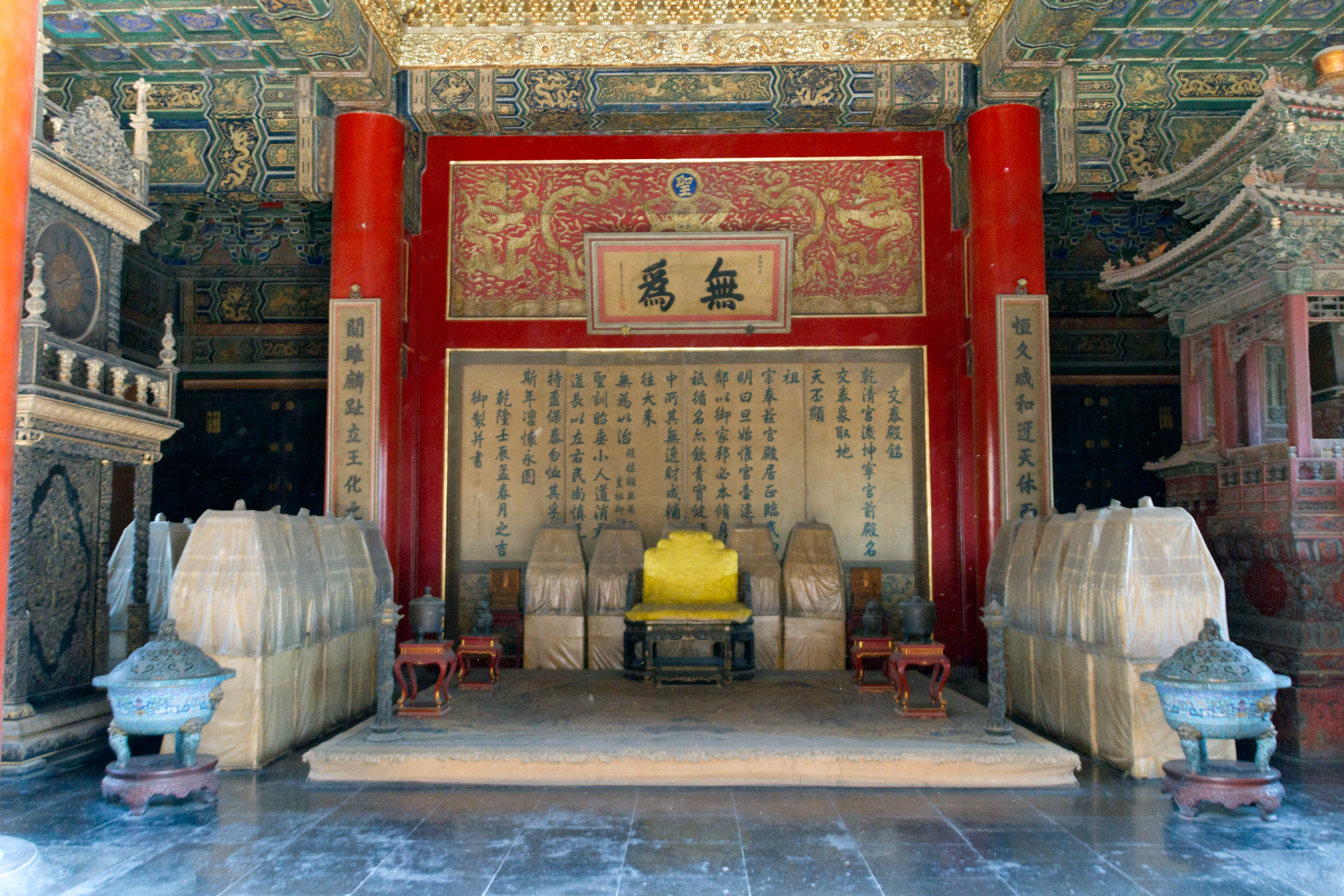
Interior of the Hall of Union

== See also ==
- Palace of Earthly Tranquility
