= Pieter Meert =

Flemish Baroque painter

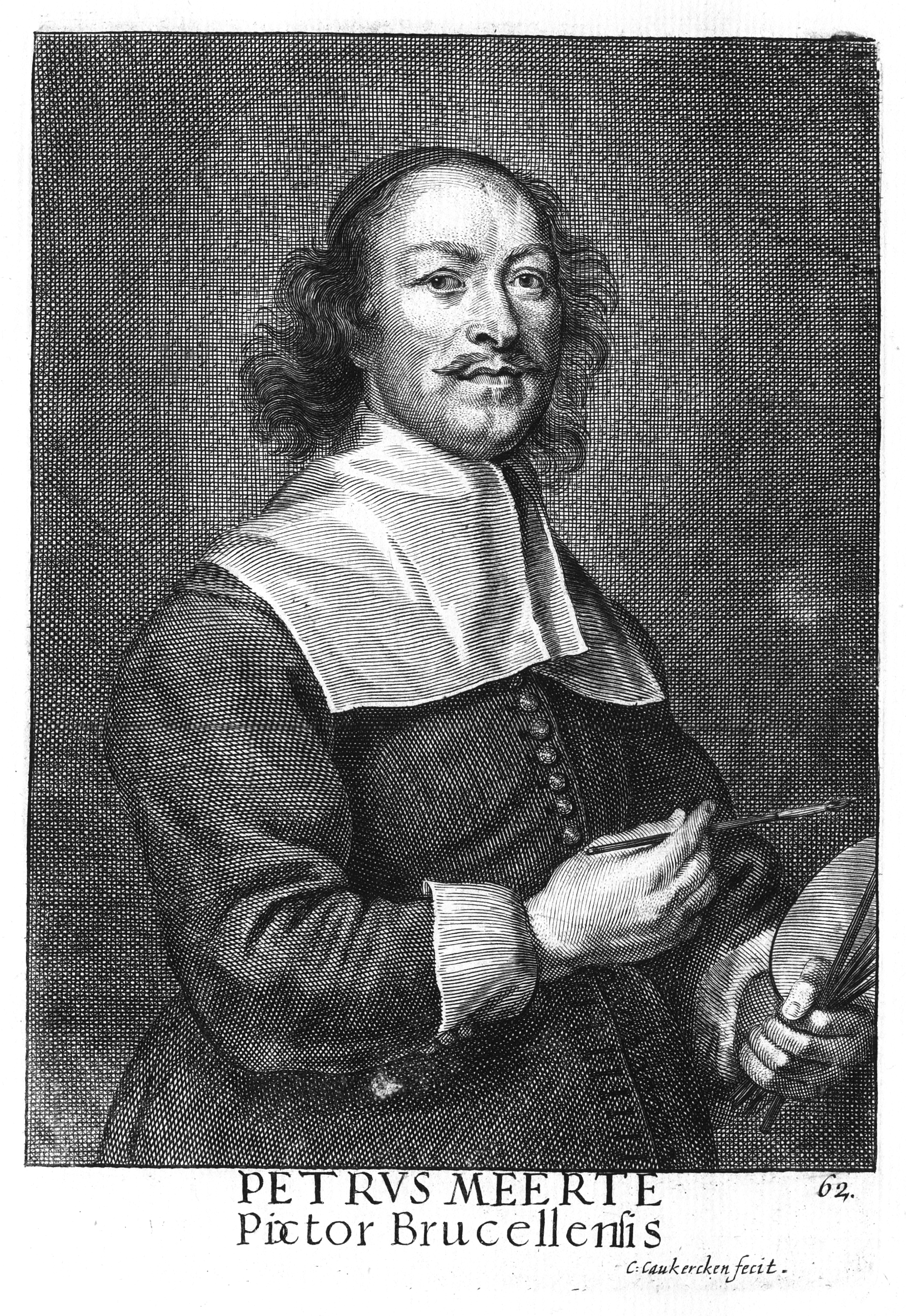
Portrait of Pieter Meert engraved by Joannes Meyssens

Pieter Meert (name variations: Petrus Meert, Peeter Meert, Peeter Meerte, Pieter Meerte, Peeter Merten, Petrus Meerte) (c. 1620 – 1669) was a Flemish Baroque painter known for his portraits and genre paintings.

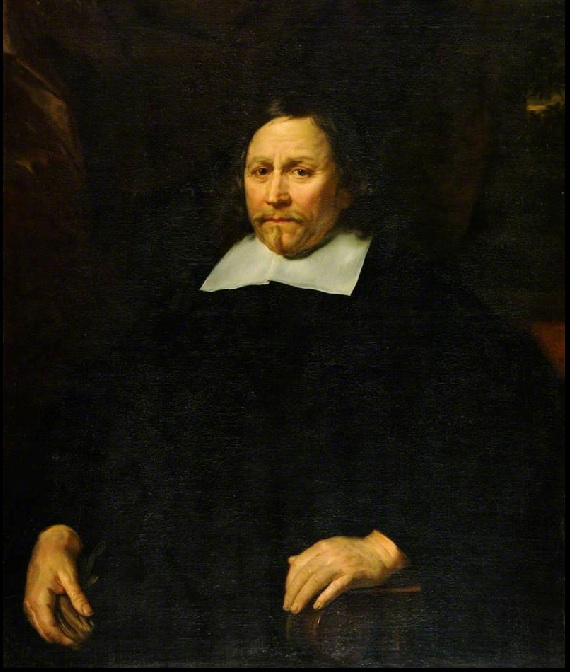
Portrait of a Man

He was born in Brussels. The early Flemish biographer Cornelis De Bie reports in his Het Gulden Cabinet published in 1662 that Meert was well known as a portrait painter, who imitated the style of Anthony van Dyck. According to the Dutch biographer Arnold Houbraken he was a good portrait painter whose works hung in various guild halls in Brussels.

Peter Capuyns was his pupil.

== Sources ==
- Bryan, Michael (1889). Walter Armstrong; Robert Edmund Graves (eds.). Dictionary of Painters and Engravers, Biographical and Critical. Vol. II L-Z. London: George Bell and Sons. p. 131.
