= 1625 =

1625 in various calendars
- Gregorian calendar: 1625; MDCXXV
- Ab urbe condita: 2378
- Armenian calendar: 1074; ԹՎ ՌՀԴ
- Assyrian calendar: 6375
- Balinese saka calendar: 1546–1547
- Bengali calendar: 1031–1032
- Berber calendar: 2575
- English Regnal year: 22 Ja. 1 – 1 Cha. 1
- Buddhist calendar: 2169
- Burmese calendar: 987
- Byzantine calendar: 7133–7134
- Chinese calendar: 甲子年 (Wood Rat); 4322 or 4115 — to — 乙丑年 (Wood Ox); 4323 or 4116
- Coptic calendar: 1341–1342
- Discordian calendar: 2791
- Ethiopian calendar: 1617–1618
- Hebrew calendar: 5385–5386
- Hindu calendars
- Vikram Samvat: 1681–1682
- Shaka Samvat: 1546–1547
- Kali Yuga: 4725–4726
- Holocene calendar: 11625
- Igbo calendar: 625–626
- Iranian calendar: 1003–1004
- Islamic calendar: 1034–1035
- Japanese calendar: Kan'ei 2 (寛永２年)
- Javanese calendar: 1546–1547
- Julian calendar: Gregorian minus 10 days
- Korean calendar: 3958
- Minguo calendar: 287 before ROC 民前287年
- Nanakshahi calendar: 157
- Thai solar calendar: 2167–2168
- Tibetan calendar: ཤིང་ཕོ་བྱི་བ་ལོ་ (male Wood-Rat); 1751 or 1370 or 598 — to — ཤིང་མོ་གླང་ལོ་ (female Wood-Ox); 1752 or 1371 or 599

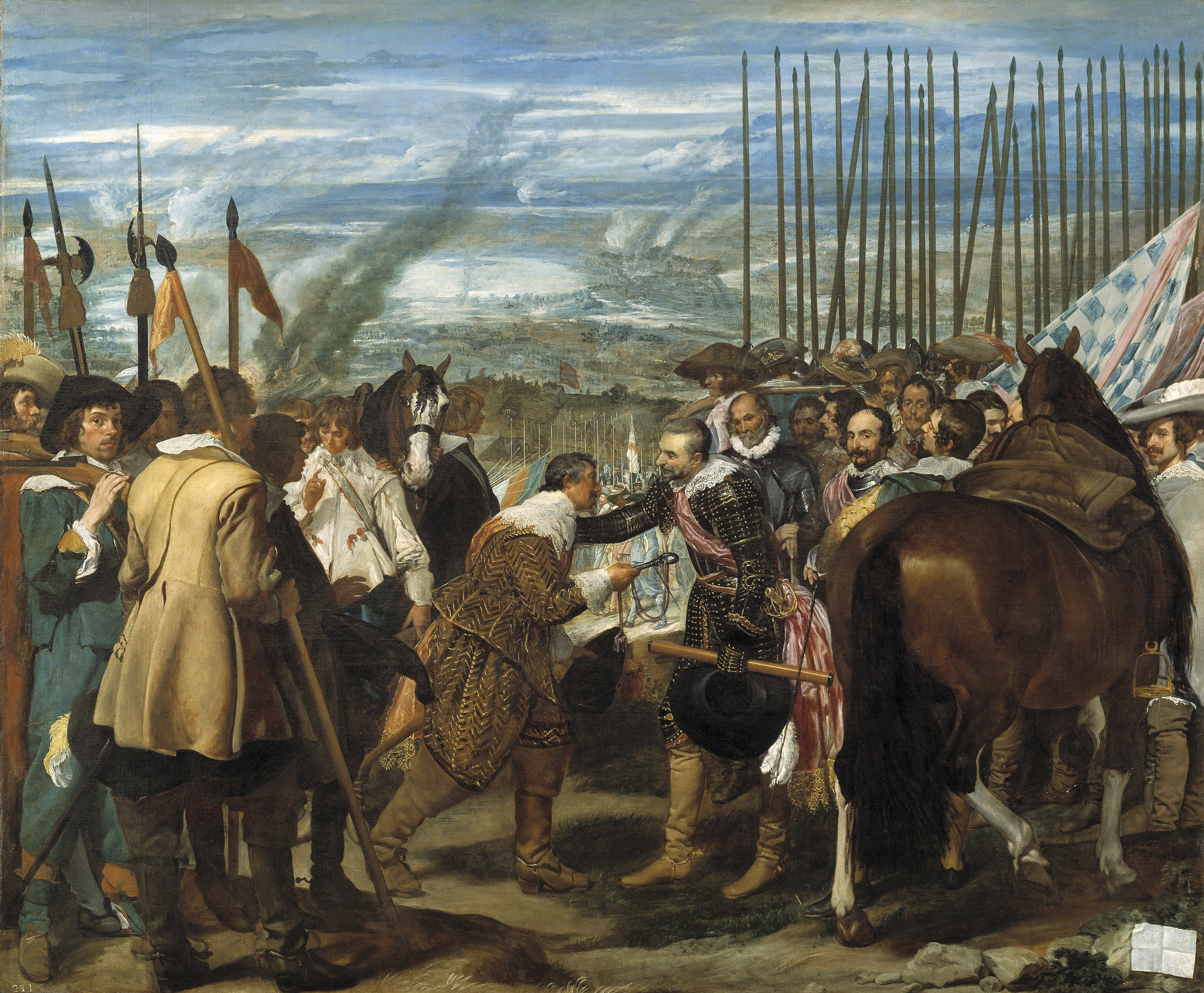
June 2: Breda is surrendered to Spanish troops after an eleven-month siege.

1625 (MDCXXV) was a common year starting on Wednesday of the Gregorian calendar and a common year starting on Saturday of the Julian calendar, the 1625th year of the Common Era (CE) and Anno Domini (AD) designations, the 625th year of the 2nd millennium, the 25th year of the 17th century, and the 6th year of the 1620s decade. As of the start of 1625, the Gregorian calendar was 10 days ahead of the Julian calendar, which remained in localized use until 1923.

== Events ==
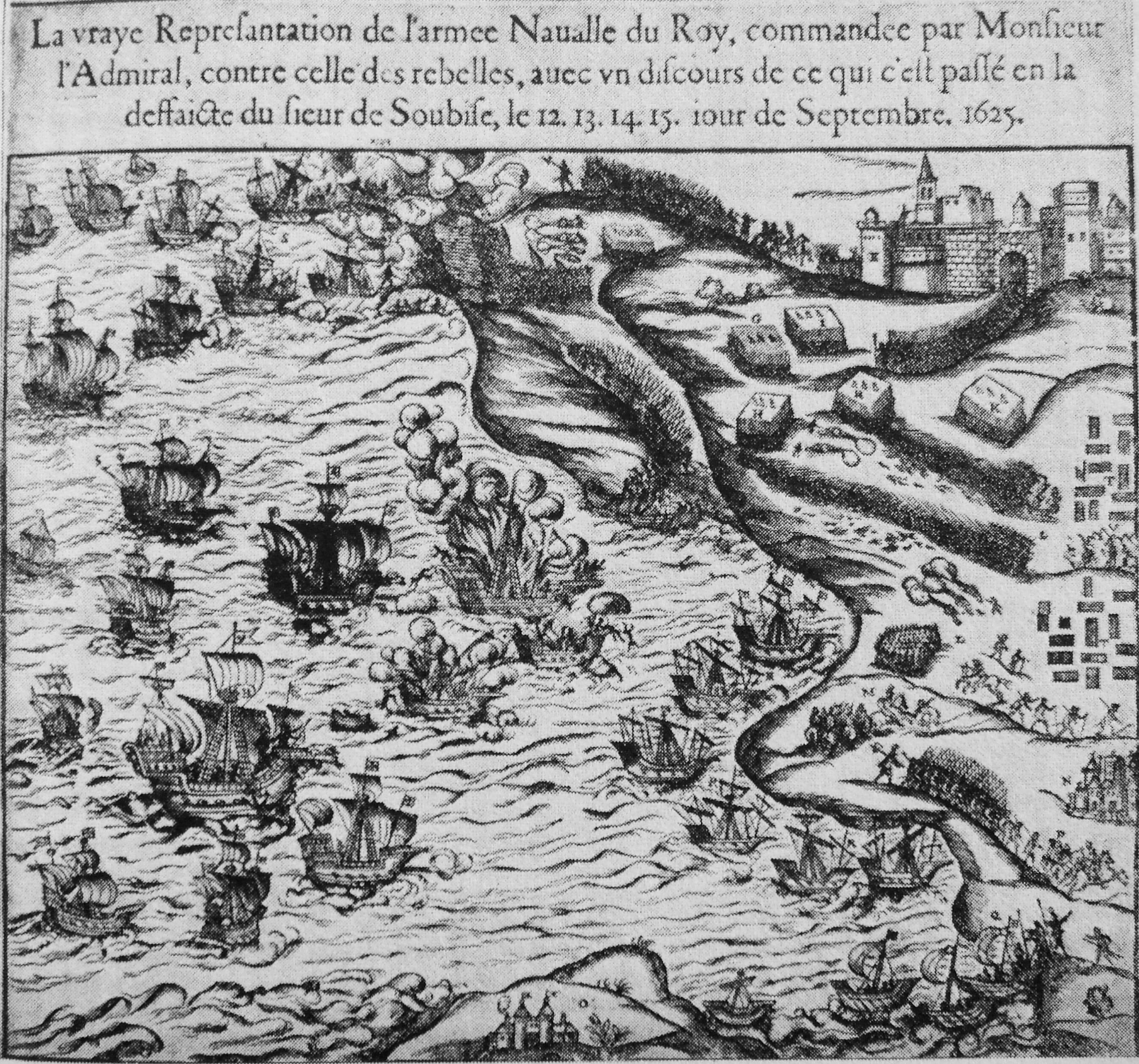
September 15: The Capture of Ré island.

=== January–March ===
- January 17 – Led by the Duke of Soubise, the Huguenots launch a second rebellion against King Louis XIII, with a surprise naval assault on a French fleet being prepared in Blavet.
- February 3 – Francesca Caccini's opera La liberazione di Ruggiero has its premiere, stated in Florence in Italy. The opera will continue to be staged almost 400 years later, as late as the year 2018.
- February 6 – Bogislaw XIV becomes the final Duke of Pomerania, an office that becomes extinct after his death in 1637.
- February 8 – Hafız Ahmed Pasha is designated as the new grand vizier of the Ottoman Empire by Sultan Murad IV, 11 days after the death of Çerkes Mehmed Pasha.
- February 11 – Dutch–Portuguese War: The Battle of Hormuz, one of the largest naval battles ever fought in the Persian Gulf takes place in the Straits of Hormuz as fleets of the Dutch East India Company and the English East India Company defend Persia against an attack by ships from the colony of Portuguese India.
- February – Huguenot forces under the Duke of Soubise capture the Island of Ré.
- March 21 – James Ussher is appointed Archbishop of Armagh (Church of Ireland) and Primate of All Ireland.
- March 28–April 24 – First Savoine War – Relief of Genoa: The Spanish fleet aids the Republic of Genoa, by overcoming the Franco-Savoyard occupation of the city of Genoa.
- March 25 – Battle of Martqopi: The Safavids are defeated in Georgia.
- March 27 – Charles I of England, Scotland and Ireland succeeds to the throne on the death of his father, King James VI and I.

=== April–June ===
- April 4 – Frederick Henry of Nassau marries Amalia, Countess von Solms-Braunfels.
- April 7 – Albrecht von Wallenstein is appointed German supreme commander of the armies of Holy Roman Emperor Ferdinand II.
- April 23 – Stadtholder Maurice of Nassau of the Dutch Republic dies, and is succeeded by his younger brother, Frederick Henry.
- May 1 – A Portuguese-Spanish expedition recaptures Salvador, Bahia (Bahia) from the Dutch.
- May 15–16 – Rebellious farmers are hanged in Vocklamarkt, Upper Austria.
- June 2 – Prince Frederick Henry is sworn in as the stadtholder of Holland and Zeeland.
- June 5 – Eighty Years' War: Spanish troops under Ambrogio Spinola conquer Breda, after a nine-month siege.
- June 13 – King Charles I of England marries Catholic princess Henrietta Maria of France and Navarre, at Canterbury.
- June 18 – The English Parliament refuses to vote Charles I the right to collect customs duties for his entire reign, restricting him to one year instead.

=== July–September ===
- July 1 – The Safavid Empire in Iran defeats an invasion from the Kingdom of Georgia in the Battle of Marabda with heavy losses on both sides, including the Georgian commander, Teimuraz I, Prince of Mukhrani. when the Iranian Safavid army defeated a Georgian force.
- July – The Barbary pirates first attack south-western England. In August they enslave about 60 people from Mount's Bay in Cornwall.
- August 6 – Ernest Casimir of Nassau-Dietz is appointed as stadtholder of Groningen.
- August 16 – Ernest Casimir of Nassau-Dietz is appointed stadtholder of Drenthe.
- September 7 – The Treaty of Southampton makes an alliance between England and the Dutch Republic, against Spain.
- September 13 – A total of 16 rabbis (including Isaiah Horowitz) are imprisoned in Jerusalem.
- September 15 – After several skirmishes in the preceding days, troops under the Marquis of Toiras successfully recapture the island of Ré, forcing the Duke of Soubise to flee to England, and ending the second Huguenot rebellion.
- September 24 – A Dutch fleet attacks San Juan, Puerto Rico.

=== October–December ===
- October 25 – A Dutch fleet attacks the Portuguese garrison at Elmina castle at modern-day Elmina, Ghana, but is defeated with heavy casualties. This defeat, along with the defeats at Bahia and Puerto Rico, causes a five-year-long lull in Dutch attacks on Spanish and Portuguese colonies.
- November 1–7 – Cádiz Expedition: English forces commanded by Admiral George Villiers (which set out from Plymouth on October 8) are decisively defeated by the Spanish at Cádiz.
- December 9 – Thirty Years' War: The Netherlands and England sign the Treaty of The Hague, a military peace treaty for providing economical aid to King Christian IV of Denmark-Norway, during his military campaigns in Germany.

=== Date unknown ===
- The Dutch settle Manhattan, founding the town of New Amsterdam. The town will transform into a piece of New York City.
- The capital of Madagascar, Antananarivo, is founded by King Andrianjaka.
- In England, a very high tide occurs, the highest ever known in the Thames, and the sea walls in Kent, Essex, and Lincolnshire are overthrown, thus great desolation is caused to the lands near the sea.
- An English colony is established in Barbados.
- The first members of the Society of Jesus move to Quebec, Canada.
- Approximate date – Shyaam a-Mbul begins to unify the Kuba Kingdom in Central Africa.

== Births ==
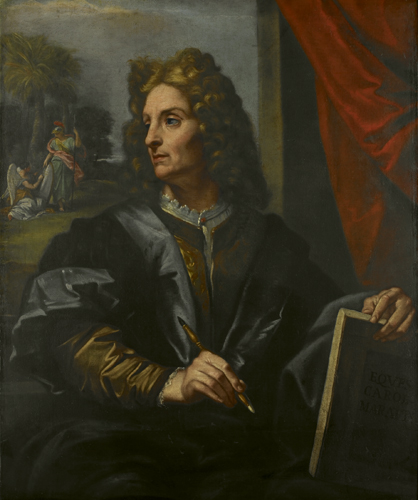
Carlo Maratta

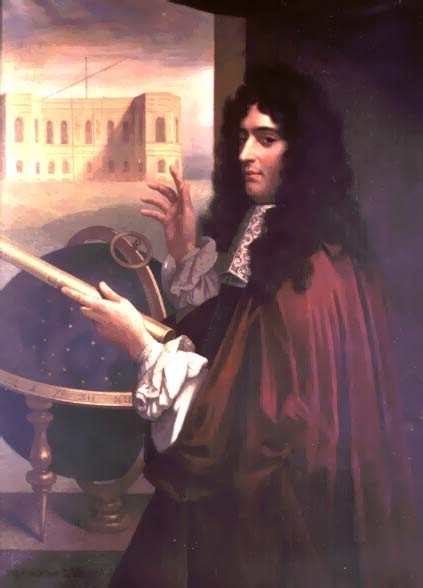
Giovanni Domenico Cassini

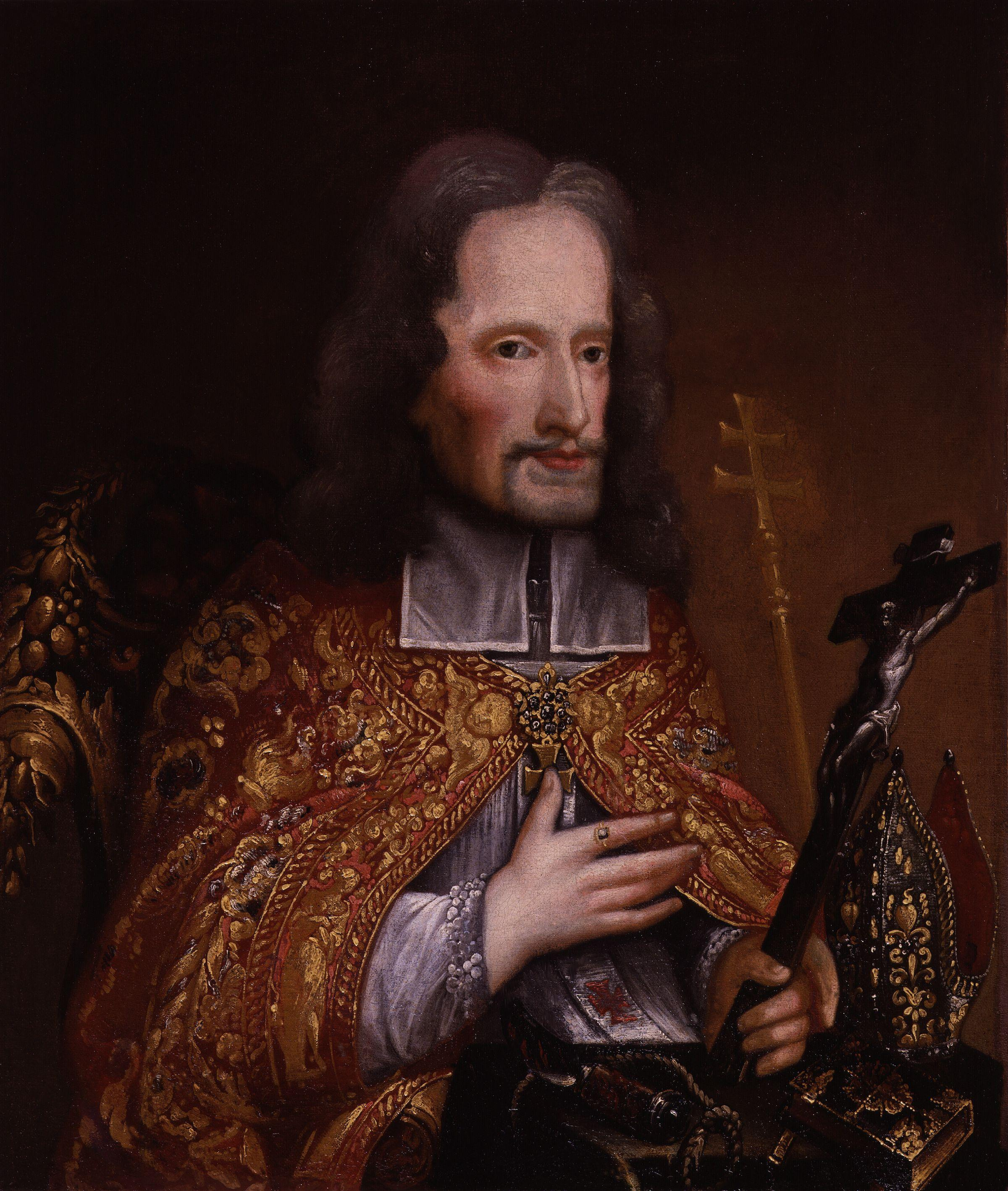
Oliver Plunkett

=== January–March ===
- January 29 – Thieleman J. van Braght, Dutch Anabaptist author (d. 1664)
- February 1 – Leopold Louis, Count Palatine of Veldenz, German noble (d. 1694)
- February 9 – Jobst Herman, Count of Lippe, Sternberg and Schwalenberg (d. 1678)
- February 14 – Maria Eufrosyne of Zweibrücken, Swedish princess (d. 1687)
- February 18 – Giovanni Giuseppe Cosattini, Italian painter (d. 1699)
- February 21 – Joan Huydecoper II, Dutch mayor (d. 1704)
- March 1 – William Gregory, English politician and judge (d. 1696)
- March 14 – Daniel Gittard, French architect (d. 1686)
- March 25
  - Ann, Lady Fanshawe, English memoirist (d. 1680)
  - John Collins, English mathematician (d. 1683)

=== April–June ===
- April 4 – Sir John Drake, 1st Baronet, English Member of Parliament (d. 1669)
- April 5 – Domenico Maria Canuti, Italian painter of the Baroque period (d. 1684)
- April 18 – Sir John Baber, English physician to Charles II (d. 1704)
- April 25 – John Frederick, Duke of Brunswick-Lüneburg, Duke of Brunswick-Calenberg (1665–1679) (d. 1679)
- May 9 – George Pitt, English politician (d. 1694)
- May 11 – Elisabeth Marie, Duchess of Oels, Regent of Oels (1664–1672) (d. 1686)
- May 13 – Carlo Maratta, Italian painter (d. 1713)
- May 23 – John Louis, Count of Nassau-Ottweiler (d. 1690)
- May 25
  - John Davies, Welsh translator and writer (d. 1693)
  - Gaspar Téllez-Girón, 5th Duke de Osuna, Spanish duke (d. 1694)
- June 8 – Giovanni Domenico Cassini, Italian astronomer and engineer (d. 1712)
- June 9 – Sarah Rapelje, the "first white child" born in New Netherland (d. 1685)
- June 10 – János Apáczai Csere, Hungarian mathematician (d. 1659)
- June 16 – Samuel Chappuzeau, French scholar (d. 1701)
- June 17 – Peder Hansen Resen, Danish historian (d. 1688)
- June 22 – Henry Cromwell-Williams, English politician (d. 1673)
- June 23 – John Fell, English churchman and influential academic (d. 1686)

=== July–September ===
- July 10 – Jean Herauld Gourville, French adventurer (d. 1703)
- July 27 – Edward Montagu, 1st Earl of Sandwich (d. 1672)
- July 30 – Philippe François, 1st Duke of Arenberg (d. 1674)
- August 9 – Hans Rosing, Norwegian bishop (d. 1699)
- August 10
  - Johann Deutschmann, German Lutheran theologian (d. 1706)
  - Augustine Reding, Swiss abbot and theologian (d. 1692)
- August 13 – Rasmus Bartholin, Danish physician and scientist (d. 1698)
- August 14 – François de Harlay de Champvallon, Archbishop of Paris (d. 1695)
- August 20 – Thomas Corneille, French dramatist (d. 1709)
- August 21 – John Claypole, English politician (d. 1688)
- September 2 – Federico Baldeschi Colonna, Italian Catholic cardinal (d. 1691)
- September 4 – Johan van Rensselaer, Dutch noble (d. 1663)
- September 5 – Charles II Otto, Count Palatine of Zweibrücken-Birkenfeld (1669–1671) (d. 1671)
- September 7 – Henry Frederick, Count of Hohenlohe-Langenburg (1628–1699) (d. 1699)
- September 8 – William Bond, first Speaker of the Massachusetts Province House of Representatives (d. 1695)
- September 13 – Thomas Reynell, English politician (d. 1698)
- September 16 – Gregorio Barbarigo, Italian Catholic saint (d. 1697)
- September 23 – Ferdinand Maximilian, Hereditary Prince of Baden-Baden, father of Louis William, Margrave of Baden-Baden (d. 1669)
- September 24 – Johan de Witt, Dutch politician (d. 1672)

=== October–December ===
- October 2 – Vere Essex Cromwell, 4th Earl of Ardglass, English noble (d. 1687)
- October 4 – Jacqueline Pascal, French child prodigy and sister of Blaise Pascal (d. 1661)
- October 5 – Edward, Count Palatine of Simmern (d. 1663)
- October 6 – Francis Small, English trader and landowner residing primarily in Kittery, Maine (d. 1714)
- October 9 – Jacques Henri de Durfort de Duras, French noble (d. 1704)
- October 10 – Erik Dahlbergh, Swedish engineer, soldier and field marshal (d. 1703)
- October 19 – Pierre Nicole, French Jansenist (d. 1695)
- October 23 – Charles Cheyne, 1st Viscount Newhaven, English Member of Parliament (d. 1698)
- October 26 – Michał Kazimierz Radziwiłł, Polish-Lithuanian noble (d. 1680)
- October 31 – Christen Jensen Lodberg, Danish bishop (d. 1693)
- November 1 – Oliver Plunkett, Irish archbishop, martyr and saint (d. 1681)
- November 7 – Henri II, Duke of Nemours, 7th Duc de Nemours (1652–59) (d. 1659)
- November 8 – Mary Rich, Countess of Warwick, 7th daughter of Richard Boyle (d. 1678)
- November 12 – Sir Edward Dering, 2nd Baronet, Irish politician (d. 1684)
- November 13 – William Christoph, Landgrave of Hesse-Homburg, Germany (d. 1681)
- November 20
  - Tønne Huitfeldt, Norwegian landowner and military officer (d. 1677)
  - Paulus Potter, Dutch painter (d. 1654)
- November 30 – Jean Domat, French jurist (d. 1696)
- December 8 – Margaret Mostyn, English Carmelite nun (d. 1679)
- December 10 – Melchior Barthel, German sculptor (d. 1672)
- December 14 – Barthélemy d'Herbelot de Molainville, French orientalist (d. 1695)
- December 16 – Erhard Weigel, German mathematician, astronomer and philosopher (d. 1699)
- December 20
  - Tamás Esterházy, Hungarian noble (d. 1652)
  - David Gregory, Scottish physician and inventor (d. 1720)
- December 24 – Johann Rudolph Ahle, German composer and organist (d. 1673)

=== Date unknown ===
- Margareta Beijer, director of the Swedish royal post office (d. 1675)

== Deaths ==
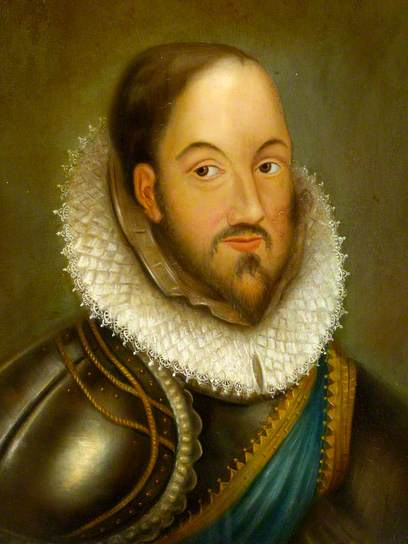
Arthur Chichester, 1st Baron Chichester died 19 February

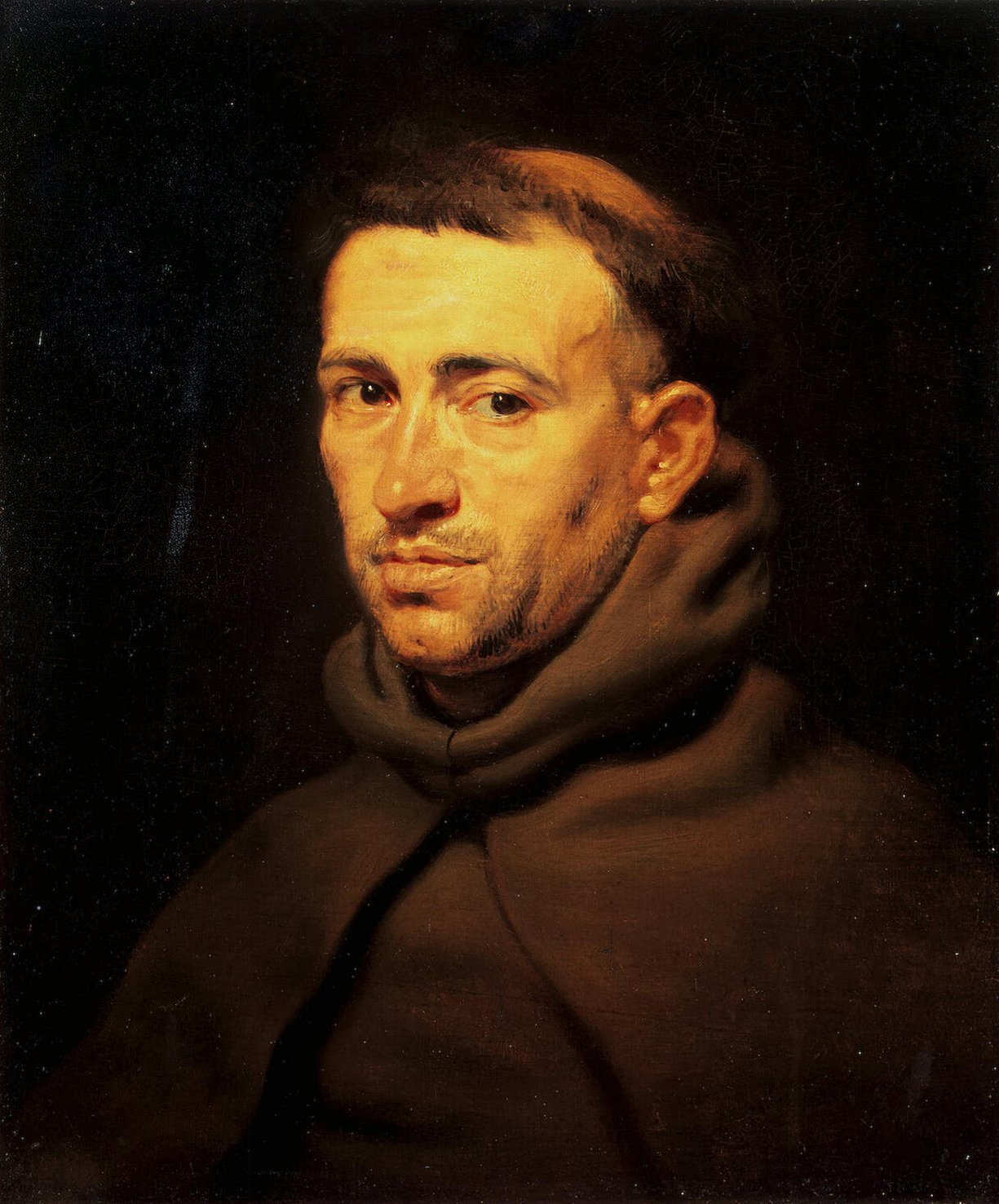
Andres de Soto died 5 April

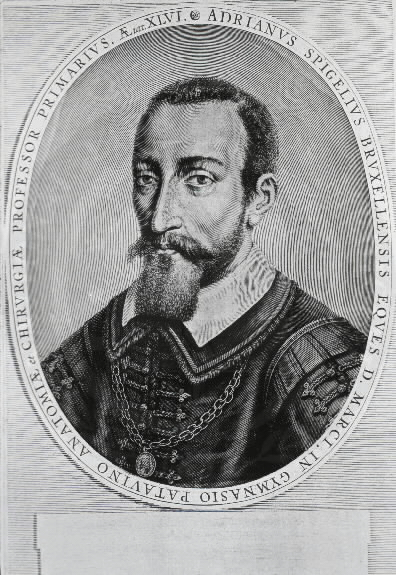
Adriaan van den Spiegel died 7 April

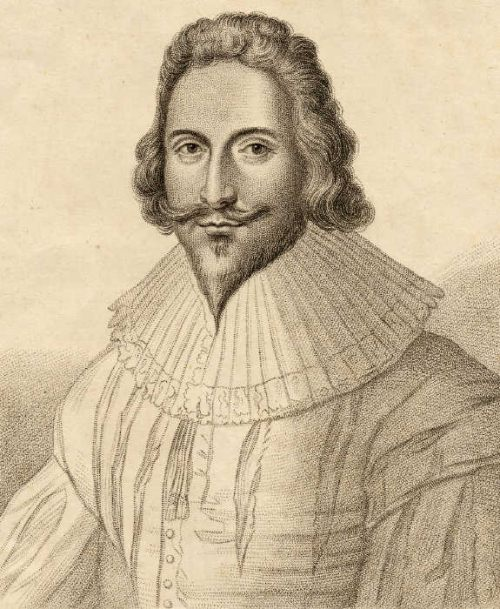
Edward la Zouche, 11th Baron Zouche died 18 August

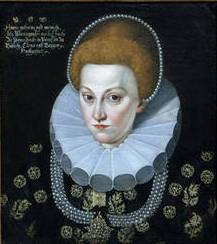
Duchess Anna of Prussia died 30 August

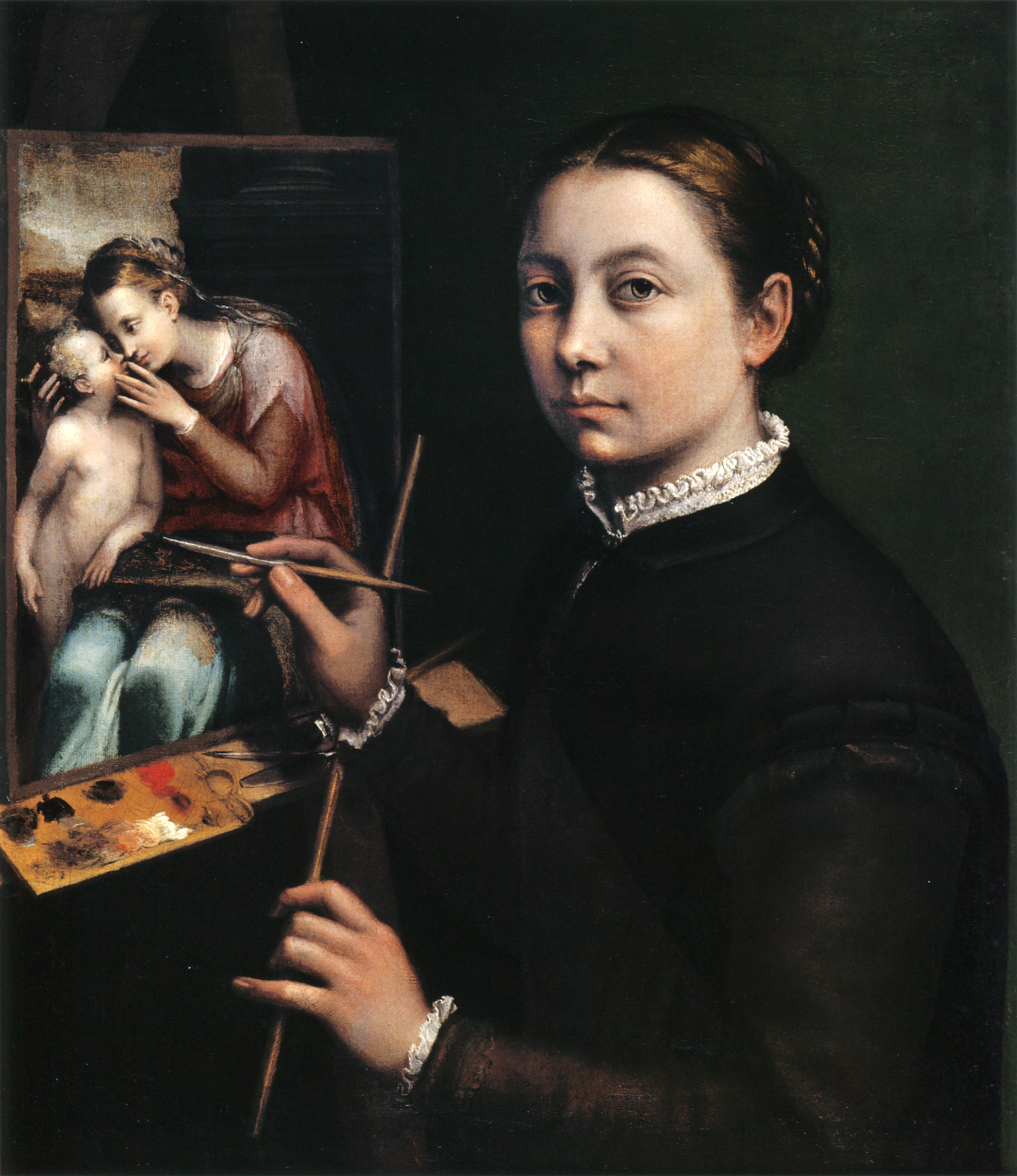
Sofonisba Anguissola died 16 November

=== January–March ===
- January/February – Robert Cushman, English Plymouth Colony settler (b. 1577)
- January 5 – Simon Marius, German astronomer (b. 1573)
- January 7 – Ruggiero Giovannelli, Italian composer (b. c. 1560)
- January 17 – Maria Dolgorukova, first spouse of Tsar Michael I of Russia (b. c. 1601)
- January 18 – John Pakington, English noble (b. 1549)
- January 23 – Count John III of Rietberg (b. 1566)
- January 27 – Adrianus Valerius, Dutch National Anthem writer (b. c. 1575)
- January 29 – Jacob Gretser, German Jesuit writer (b. 1562)
- February 6 – Philipp Julius, Duke of Pomerania (b. 1584)
- February 19 – Arthur Chichester, 1st Baron Chichester, English peer (b. 1563)
- February 26
  - Anna Vasa of Sweden, Polish and Swedish princess (b. 1568)
  - Jeremiah of Wallachia, Romanian-born Capuchin lay brother, who spent his entire adult life serving as an infirmarian of the Order in Italy (b. 1556)
- March 2 – James Hamilton, 2nd Marquess of Hamilton (b. 1589)
- March 7
  - Johann Bayer, German lawyer and uranographer (celestial cartographer) (b. 1572)
  - Joachim Ernst, Margrave of Brandenburg-Ansbach (1603–1625) (b. 1583)
- March 26 – Giambattista Marino, Italian poet (b. 1569)
- March 27 – King James VI of Scotland/James I of England and Ireland (b. 1566)
- March 28 or March 29 – Antonio de Herrera y Tordesillas, Spanish historian (b. 1549)

=== April–June ===
- April 5 – Andres de Soto, Franciscan preacher and spiritual writer (b. 1552)
- April 7 – Adriaan van den Spiegel, Flemish physician, anatomist (b. 1578)
- April 10 – Michael de Sanctis, Spanish Trinitarian priest (b. 1591)
- April 15 – Thomas Field, Irish Jesuit (b. 1546)
- April 16 – Nicholas Assheton, English country squire, writer (b. 1590)
- April 23 – Maurice, Prince of Orange (b. 1567)
- April 30
  - Marco Passionei, Italian Catholic, member of the Order of Friars Minor (b. 1560)
  - Lawrence Tanfield, British politician (b. 1551)
- May 7 – John Garrard, Lord Mayor of London (1601-1602) (b. 1550)
- May 25 – William Barlow, British scientist (b. 1603)
- June 1 – Honoré d'Urfé, French writer (b. 1568)
- June 2 – Mōri Terumoto, Japanese warrior (b. 1553)
- June 5 – Orlando Gibbons, English composer and organist (b. 1583)

=== July–September ===
- July 1 – Teimuraz I, Prince of Mukhrani, Georgian prince (b. 1572)
- July 19 – Samuel Besler, Polish composer (b. 1574)
- July 26 – Johannes Piscator, German theologian (b. 1546)
- August 3 – Ludovico Bertonio, Italian missionary (b. 1552)
- August 14 – Hans Rottenhammer, German artist (b. 1564)
- August 15 – Mary Cholmondeley, English medieval lady, litigant over her inheritance (b. 1563)
- August 18 – Edward la Zouche, 11th Baron Zouche, English diplomat (b. 1556)
- August 19 – Enno III, Count of East Frisia, Count of Ostfriesland (1599-1625) from the Cirksena Family (b. 1563)
- August 29 – John Fletcher, English writer (b. 1579)
- August 30 – Duchess Anna of Prussia, daughter of Albert Frederick (b. 1576)
- September 4 – Thomas Smythe, English diplomat (b. 1558)
- September 6 – Thomas Dempster, Scottish historian (b. 1579)
- September 11 – Charles Montagu, English politician (b. 1564)
- September 14
  - Pieter Isaacsz, Dutch painter (b. 1569)
  - Edward Mayhew, English priest (b. 1569)
- September 19 – Eitel Frederick von Hohenzollern-Sigmaringen, German Catholic cardinal (b. 1582)
- September 20 – Heinrich Meibom, German historian and poet (b. 1555)
- September 26 – Edward Stafford, 4th Baron Stafford of England (b. 1572)

=== October–December ===
- October 1 – César Oudin, French translator (b. 1560)
- October 6 – Anthony Irby, English politician (b. 1547)
- October 22 – Kikkawa Hiroie, Japanese politician (b. 1561)
- October 24
  - Duke Friedrich of Saxe-Altenburg, Third son of Duke Friedrich Wilhelm I of Saxe-Weimar (b. 1599)
  - Abraham Scultetus, German theologian (b. 1566)
- October 25 – Hans Michael Elias von Obentraut, Palatinate cavalry general in the Thirty Years' War (b. 1574)
- November 3 – Adam Gumpelzhaimer, German composer (b. 1559)
- November 16 – Sofonisba Anguissola, Italian painter (b. c. 1532)
- November 19 – Johann Reinhard I, Count of Hanau-Lichtenberg (b. 1569)
- December 8 – Christina of Holstein-Gottorp, queen consort of King Charles IX of Sweden (b. 1573)
- December 9 – Ubbo Emmius, Dutch historian and geographer (b. 1547)
- December 16 – Elizabeth of Hesse-Kassel, Duchess of Mecklenburg-Gütsrow (b. 1596)
- December 27 – Charles Baillie, Flemish-born Scottish papal agent (b. 1542)

=== Date unknown ===
- Richard Fowns, English divine (b. 1560?)
- Willem Schouten, Dutch navigator (died at sea) (b. c. 1567)
- Juan de las Roelas, Spanish artist (b. 1558)
