= Passionei =

Passionei is an Italian surname. Notable people with the surname include:

- Domenico Silvio Passionei (1682–1761), Italian Roman Catholic cardinal
- Marco Passionei (1560–1625), Italian Roman Catholic priest

== See also ==
- Charles Félix Jean-Baptiste Camerata-Passionei di Mazzoleni
