= Nicolò Grassi =

Italian painter (1682–1748)

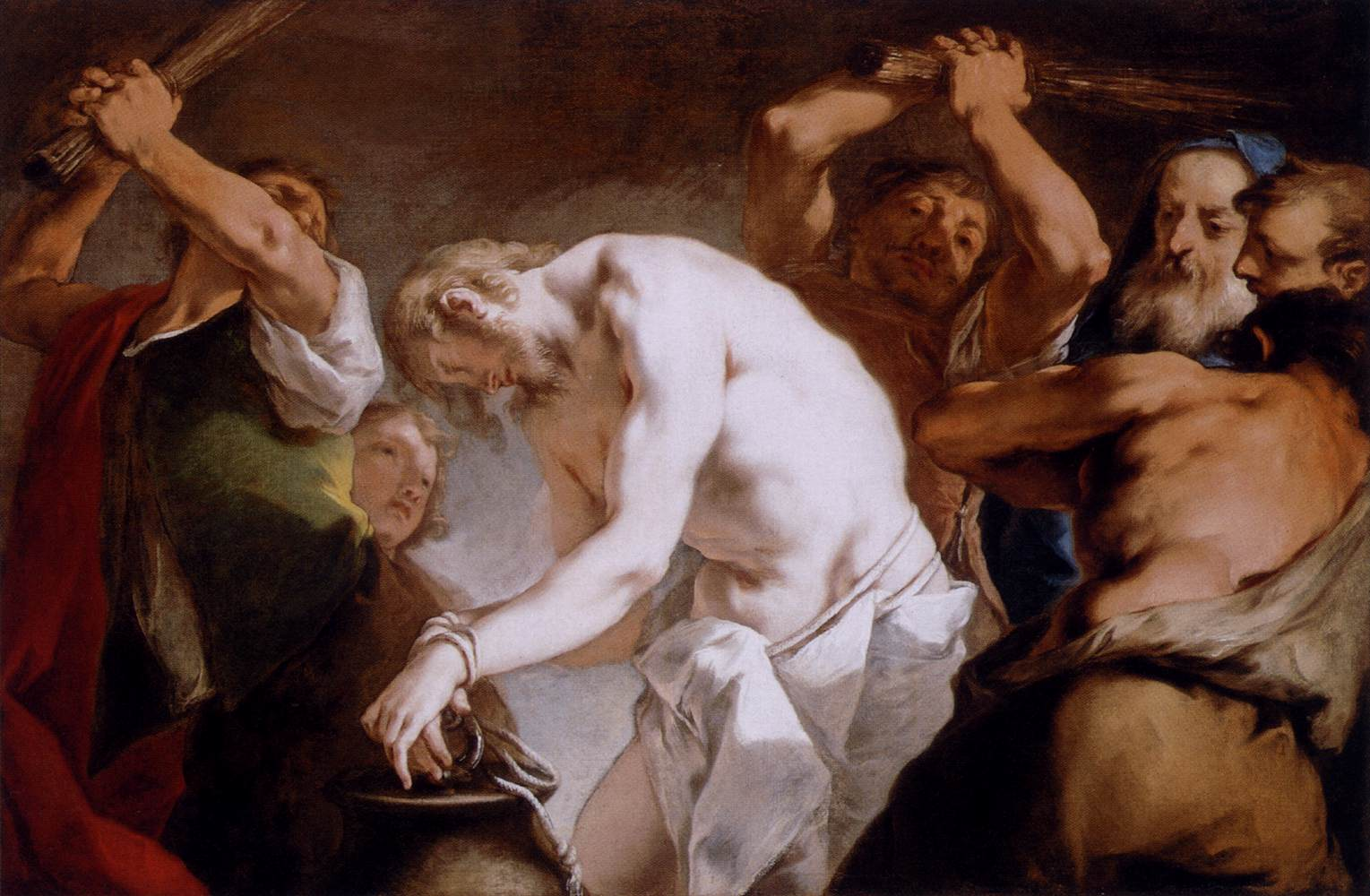
Flagellation of Christ by Nicolo Grassi, 1720

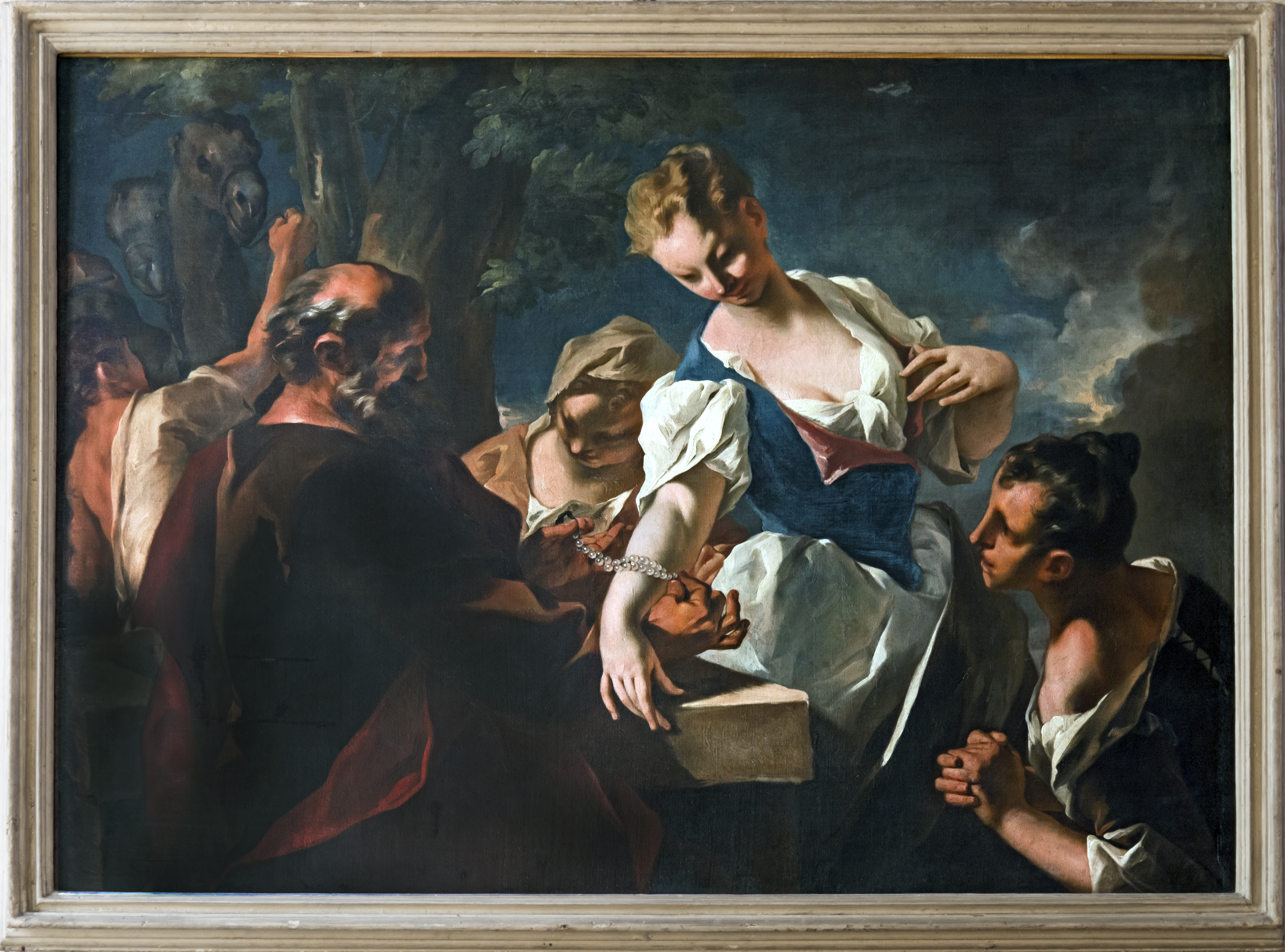
La samaritana (Rebecca) al pozzo by Nicolo Grassi, 1720

Nicolò Grassi (7 April 1682 – 6 October 1748), also known as Nicola Grassi, was an Italian painter, active in a late-Baroque or Rococo style.

== Biography ==
He was born in Formeaso in the Friuli and died in Venice.

After studying as an apprentice with Antonio Carneo he moved to Venice in 1697 after his death. He worked with the Genovese artist Nicolo Cassana until 1709.

In 1710, he was recognized for his work The Virgin with Child and two saints. Between 1722 and 1725, he went to Bavaria and then to Dalmatia.

== Sources ==
- Aldo Rizzi, The Masters of Venetian Painting Electa, Milan 1973.
