= Antonio Carneo =

Italian painter (1637–1692)

Antonio Carneo (1637–1692) was an Italian painter, active in Friuli and Venice, and depicting both mythologic, allegoric, and religious canvases, as well as portraits.

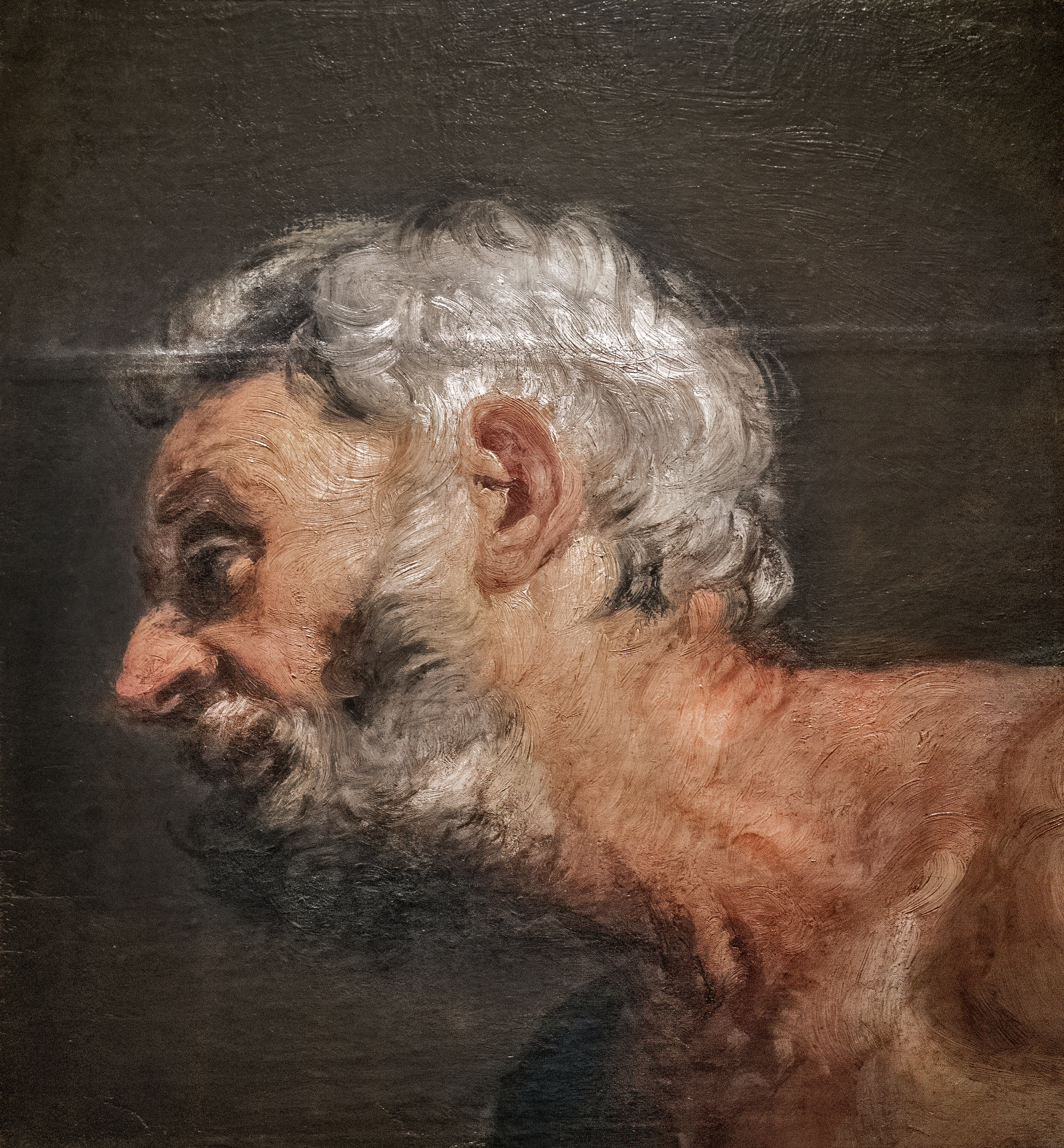
Head of an Elderly by Antonio Carneo - Pinacotheque Egidio Martini

== Biography ==
He was born in Concordia Sagittaria, and trained under his father as a painter. He was active for many years in Portogruaro. Other sources cite him as a pupil of Giovanni Giuseppe Cosattini (1625-1699) in Udine, but his paintings appear best to model Tintoretto and Paolo Veronese.

In Portogruaro, he painted an altarpiece depicting the Charity of St Thomas of Villanova for the church of Santa Lucia. In the town castle chapel, he painted a Christ and saints. For the other rooms he painted the Redeemer with St Marck and donors and a St Peter Martyr. He painted a Last Supper for the town convent. For the church of San Rocco, he painted the main altarpiece depicting St Francis and companions. In 1604, he painted four altarpieces for the church of San Francesco.

There was another painter Giacomo Carneo subsequently active in Friuli.

For the Sanctuary of the Madonna delle Grazie in Cordovado, he painted panels for ceiling of the apse depicting: Apparition of the Virgin to an infirm man, Apparition of the Virgin to a Monk painting an icon, Miracle of the Virgin of the Snows at the inauguration of the Santa Maria Maggiore; and Apparition of the Virgin during a battle.
