= Hans Michael Elias von Obentraut =

German cavalry general (1574–1625)

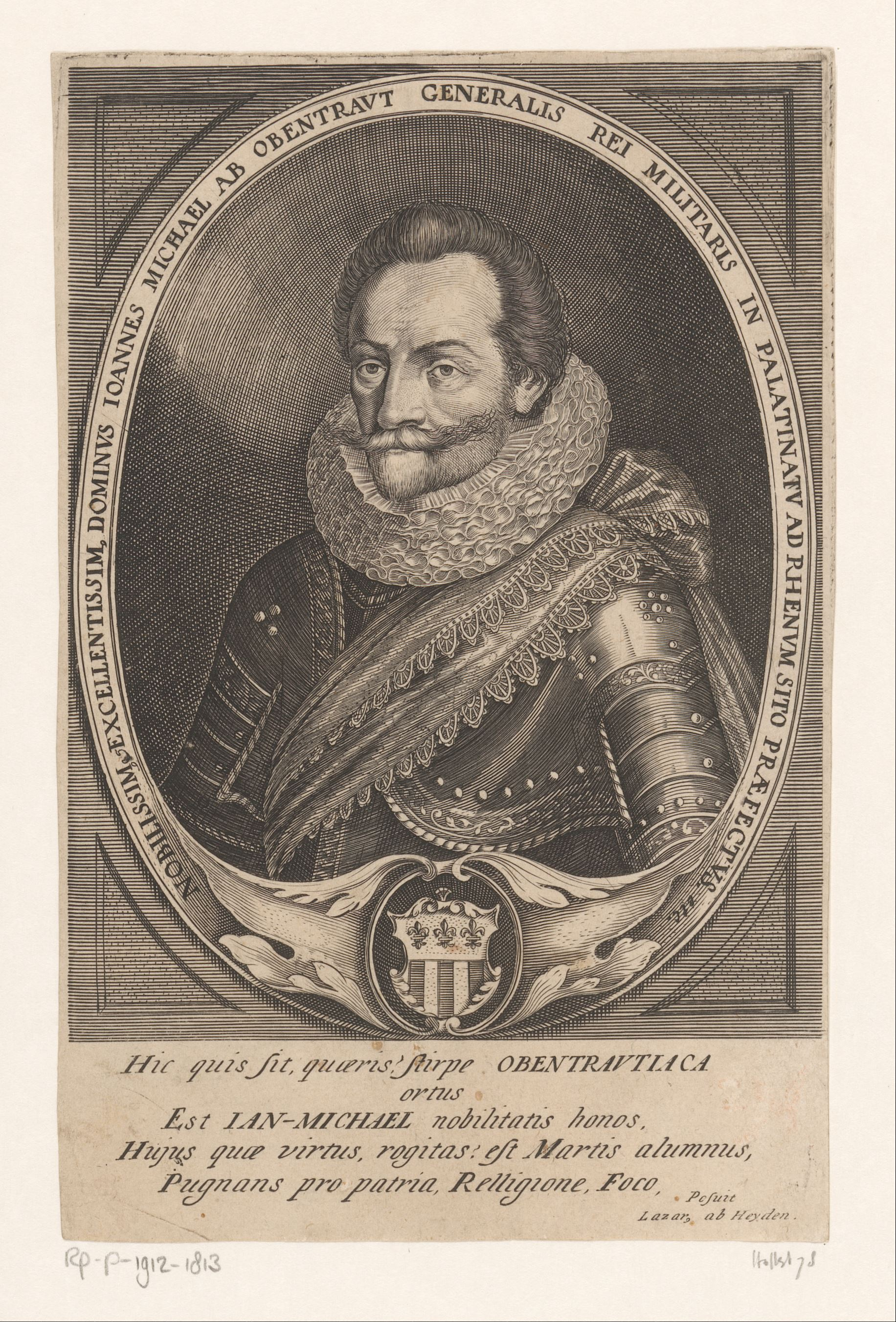
- Hans-Michael Elias von Obentraut
- Born: 1574; Stromburg, near Stromberg
- Died: 25 October 1625; Seelze
- Buried: Market Church in Hanover

Hans Michael Elias of Obentraut (also known as Johann Michel Elias von Obentraut; 1574 at the Stromburg near Stromberg – 25 October 1625 in Seelze) was a German cavalry general, who fought on the side of the Protestant Union during the Thirty Years' War.

== Life ==
Obentraut was born in Stromberg as the son of the Amtmann, Johan Bartel von Obentraut. He joined the army at an early age and is said to have been a formidable opponent because of his boldness. He initially served in the army of the Electorate of the Palatinate and joined Johann Tserclaes, Count of Tilly, on whose side he had fought against the Turks in Hungary. Later, Johann Tserclaes would be his prime opponent. At the Battle of the White Mountain, Obentraut already fought on the Protestant side. He joined the Danish army and won battles at Frankenthal, Haguenau and Wiesloch.

== Death in Seelze ==
His last victory occurred at Nienburg, when he served as lieutenant general of Duke John Ernest I of Saxe-Weimar. He prevented the army of the Catholic League, led by Johann Tserclaes, from occupying the town. After this success, Obentraut intended to take Calenberg Castle in Schulenburg near Pattensen, which Tserclaes had occupied. On his way there, his unit of 700 horsemen met an army of 10000troops from Tserclaes's army at Seelze near Hanover. Obentraut rushed to the scene; legend has it that he was in such a hurry that he wore only one boot and no helmet. During the ensuing battle, he was hit by a fatal bullet. He died in the presence of Tserclaes, his former brother in arms. Legend has it that Tserclaes closed Obentraut's eyes.

Obentraut's body was held at Calenberg Castle for four months, before he was exchanged for a leading officer. His body was then transferred to the St. Aegidius Church in Hanover. Two years later, he was finally buried in the Market Church, also in Hanover.

== Obentraut Monument ==
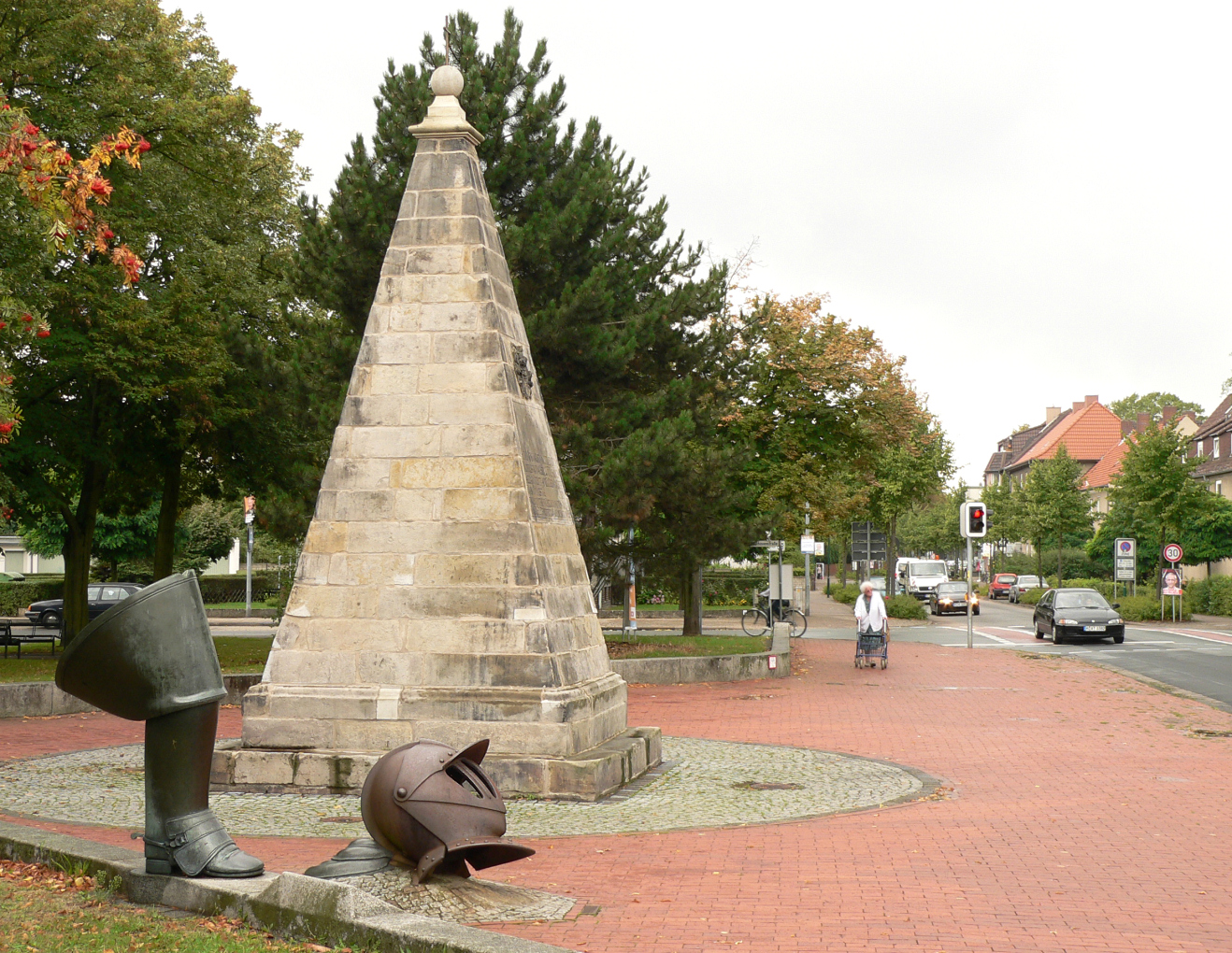
The Obentraut monument in Seelze

A 5.8-metre-high (19 ft) monument was erected in Seelze at the spot where Obentraut was wounded mortally. It was made in 1630 by the sculptor Jeremias Sutel (1587–1631) from Hanover. It is unknown who commissioned the monument. The monument carries an inscription in Latin and the quote dedicated to the highest and best God.

In 1989, an oversized metal riding boot and a helmet were installed next to the monument. They point to the items Obentraut was missing when he threw himself into the fray.

The main thoroughfare through Seelze passes by this monument in the town center.

== German Michel ==
Legend has it that Tserclaes's Spanish troops were awed by his bravery and called him Deutscher Michel. However, no proof of this story has been found in either Spanish or German contemporary sources. The first author to mention it was Philipp Andreas Oldenburger in 1668, in a book published under the pseudonym Philipp Andreas Burgoldensis. Oldenburg's reputation as a scientist was somewhat controversial during his lifetime.
