= Melchior Barthel =

German sculptor

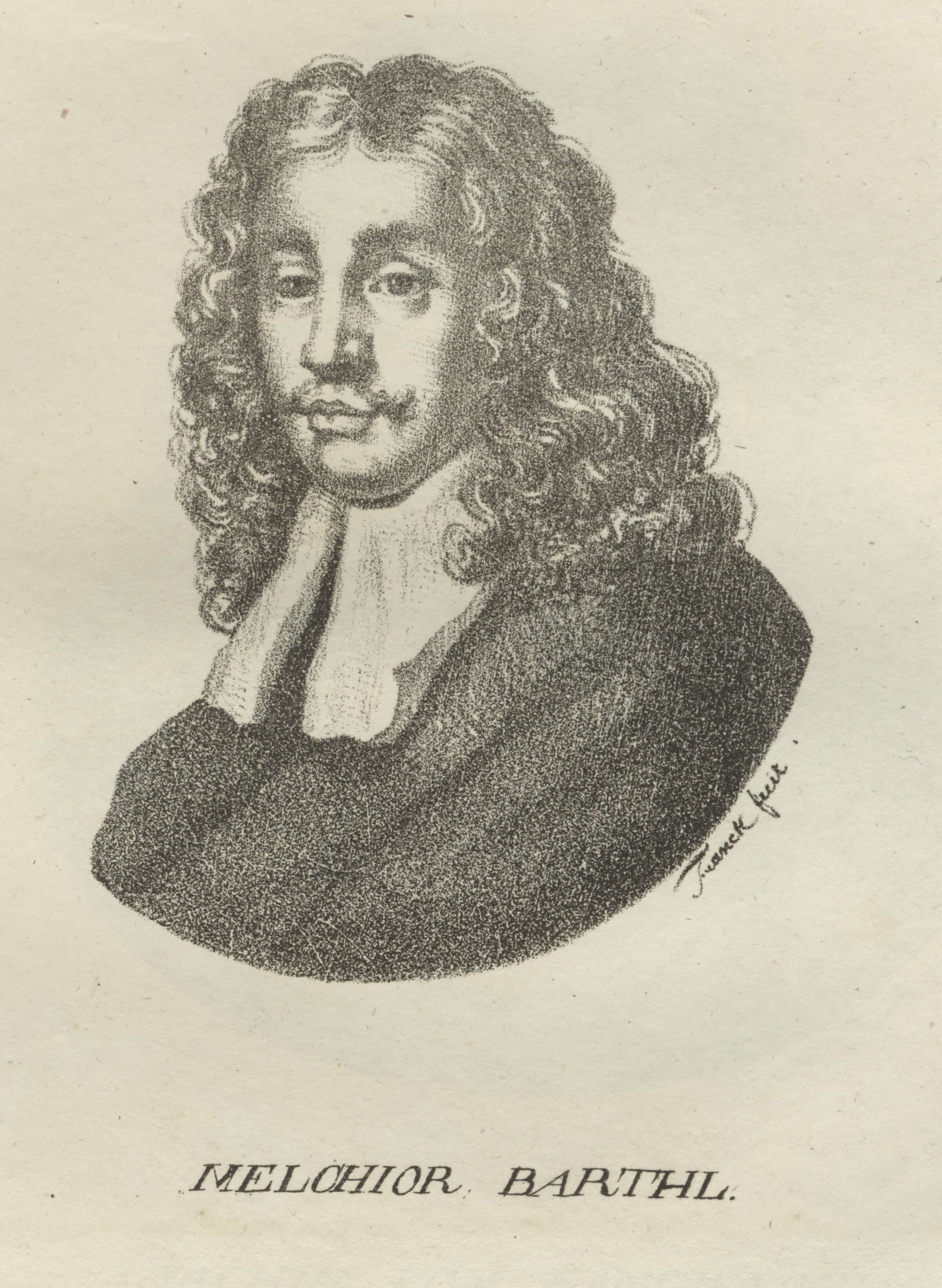
- Born: 10 December 1625; Dresden
- Died: 12 November 1672 (aged 46); Dresden

Melchior Barthel (born 10 December 1625 in Dresden; died there 12 November 1672) was a German sculptor.

== Biography ==
He studied with his father and with Johann Boehme, of Schneeberg (1640–45), and settled at Dresden, where he was appointed sculptor to the court.

== Works ==
His principal works are the colossal tomb of the Doge Giovanni Pesaro (Santa Maria dei Frari, Venice); the statue of John the Baptist (chapel of Santa Maria, Nazareth); and a tomb in San Giovanni e Paolo, Venice. His numerous ivory carvings in the Green Vault at Dresden are considered superior to his more elaborate works.

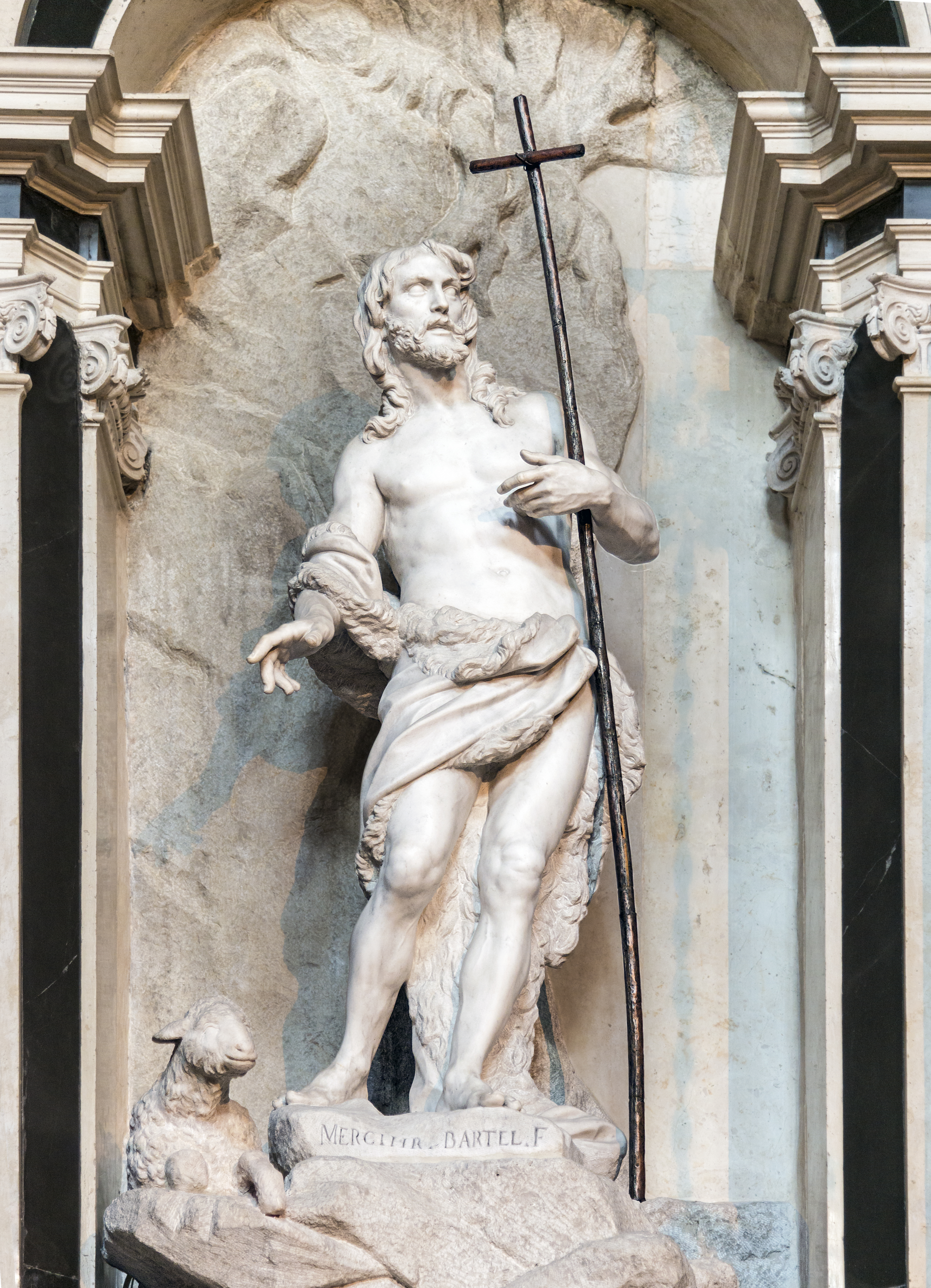
John the Baptist Scalzi, Venice

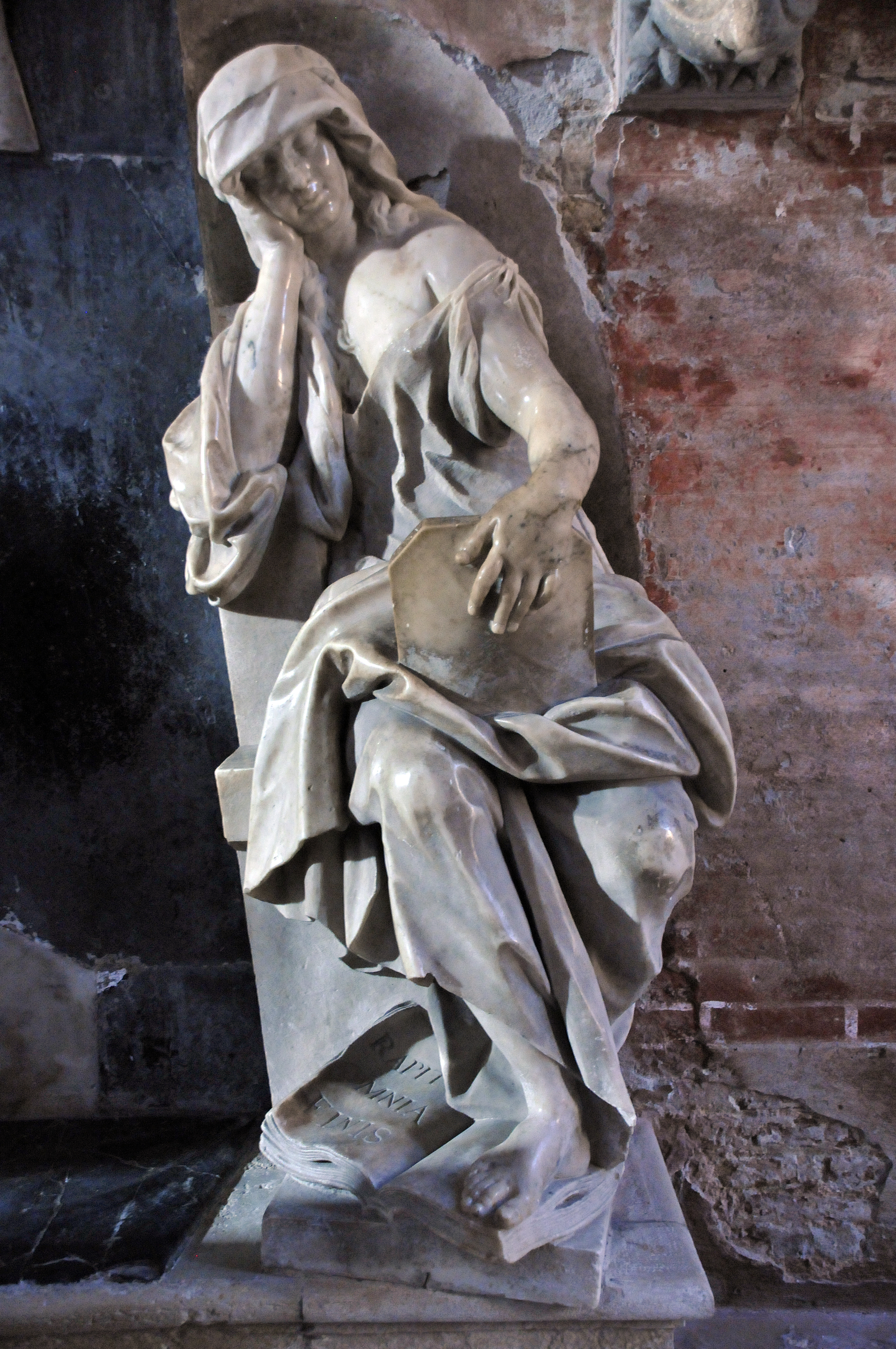
"Melancholy" at Santi Giovanni e Paolo, Venice
