= Richard Fowns =

Richard Fowns (1560?–1625), was an English divine.

Fowns, 'a minister's son and Worcestershire man born,' was elected student of Christ Church, Oxford, in 1577, at the age of seventeen, and graduated B.A. 30 January 1581, M.A. 3 April 1585. He took the degrees of B.D. and D.D. by accumulation, 16 May 1605. He became chaplain to Prince Henry, and in 1602 was rector of Severn Stoke, Worcestershire, in the church of which he was buried 25 November 1625. His monument was 'miserably defaced' during the English Civil War.

He was the author of: 1. 'Concio [on 2 Thess. ii. 3, 4] ad Clerum celeberrimæ florentissimæq; Academiæ Oxoñ. habita Iulij decimo, Anno Domini 1606,' 4to, London, 1606, dedicated to Henry, prince of Wales. 2. 'Trisagion, or the three Holy Offices of Iesvs Christ, the Sonne of God, priestly, propheticall, and regall; how they ought of all his Church to be receiued. With a Declaration of the violence and iniuries offered vnto the same by the Spirituall and Romish Babylon,' London, 1619, a stout quarto of 782 pages, inscribed to Prince Charles.
