= Philipp Andreas Oldenburger =

Philipp Andreas Oldenburger was a 17th century lawyer and political historian from the Holy Roman Empire.

After writing a pamphlet that offended German authorities, he was placed under arrest and sentenced to eat his writings. While carrying out his sentence, he was flogged, with orders given not to stop the flogging until he had eaten the last page.

Oldenburger died in 1678.
