= Giovanni Giuseppe Cosattini =

Italian painter (1625–1699)

Giovanni Giuseppe Cosattini (February 18, 1625 in Udine – 1699) was an Italian painter, mainly active in Udine, and after 1668 in the imperial court of Vienna.

== Biography ==
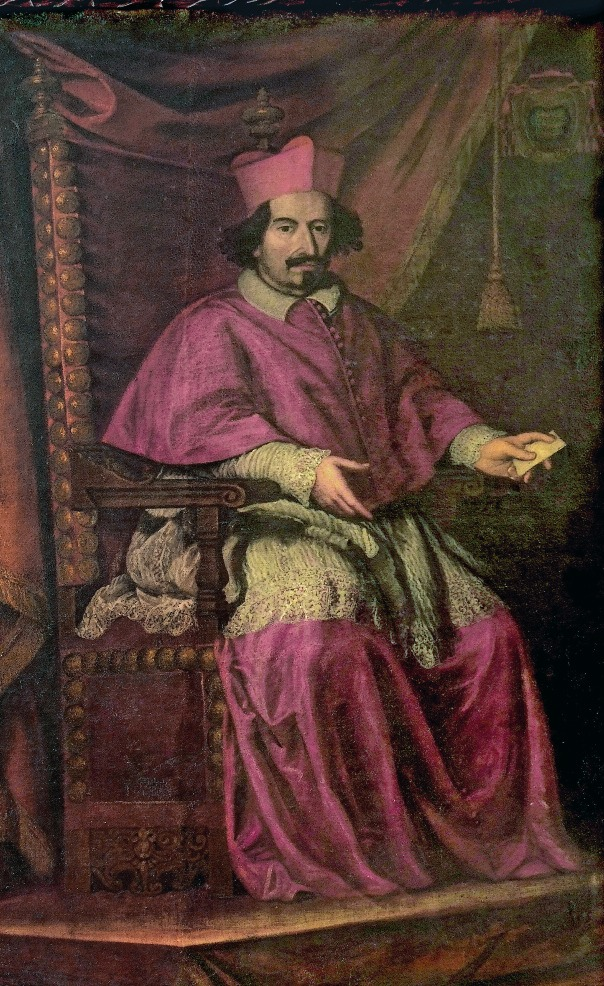
Patriarch Giovanni Dolfin, San Daniele del Friuli, Cathedral

It is unclear from whom Cosattini gained his training; he became in 1654 a canon in Aquileia, and thus had opportunities to be exposed to Venetian painters. His style seems to reflect the work of Padovanino. He painted a St Phillip in Ectasy for the Oratory of the Fillipini, and also painted for the church of the Carità in Udine. He returned to Udine from Vienna after breaking a limb in a fall from a scaffold.

== Style ==
Not much is known about Cosattini's early career. One of his few remaining works is the altarpiece of the church of Charity of Udine. It is a painting of the Holy Family. The painting has been dated to 1659. The painting reflects a link to Padovanino and, to some extent, Palma il Giovane, leading to the conjecture that Cosattini had at some point been an apprenticeship of the two painters or that he had closely followed their work and adopted it into his own style. Cosattini's close stylistic ties with Padovanino are further demonstrated in the seven paintings, thought to be made by Cosattini, that cover the main hall of the Uccellis College of Udine.
