= Marco Passionei =

Italian Roman Catholic (1560–1625)

Blessed Marco Passionei O.F.M. Cap.
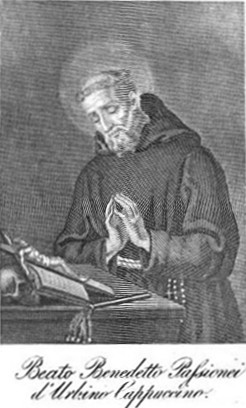

Priest
- Born: 13 September 1560; Urbino, Pesaro-Urbino, Papal States
- Died: 30 April 1625 (aged 64); Fossombrone, Pesaro-Urbino, Papal States
- Venerated in: Roman Catholic Church
- Beatified: 10 February 1867, Saint Peter's Basilica, Papal States by Pope Pius IX
- Canonized: 10 August 1867
- Feast: 30 April
- Attributes: Franciscan habit; Crucifix; Book
- Patronage: Missionaries

Marco Passionei (13 September 1560 – 30 April 1625) - in religion Benedetto da Urbino - was an Italian Roman Catholic and a professed member from the Order of Friars Minor Capuchin. Passionei was of frail constitution which led to a number of rejections from the order but he was allowed to enter and was later ordained - he served in the missions for a period of time before his death.

Pope Pius IX confirmed his beatification in 1867.

== Life ==
Marco Passionei was born on 13 September 1560 as the seventh of eleven children to the nobles Domenico Passionei and Maddalena Cibo. His parents died sometime in his childhood.

He graduated with a doctorate in both civil and canon law in Padua in 1582 and decided to enter the Order of Friars Minor Capuchin after responding to his religious calling. He first served in Rome to the court of Cardinal Gian Girolamo Albani but realized he did not want to remain there as it did not serve his religious aspirations. Passionei was soon able to admit himself - after several rejections - to the order in Fano at the convent of Santa Caterina despite his fragile health and was placed under the direction of Father Bonaventura; he received the habit on 1 May 1584 and later professed in May 1585. He was forced to leave a few months later and moved to recuperate from stomach ailments in a convent in Fossombrone. Passionei underwent his theological formation under Father Girolamo da Castelferretti.

Passionei was later ordained to the priesthood in 1590 and assumed the religious name of "Benedetto da Urbino". He was then sent as part of a team of missionaries in 1600 with Lawrence of Brindisi to Bohemia after Pope Clement VIII ordered that missionaries be sent there to evangelize; he was stationed there until 1603. He often was troubled with leg pains and often fasted in addition to flagellating himself for half an hour and wearing a hairnet; he slept little and often on a wooden plank.

He died on 30 April 1625 after a period of ill health. He went for an operation on a hernia in Lent but his health declined and this led to his death not long after.

== Beatification ==
The sainthood process commenced in Urbino under Pope Innocent XII on 17 September 1796 - it granted him the title of Servant of God. His life of heroic virtue was recognized on 24 February 1798 and allowed for Pope Pius VI to confer upon him the title of Venerable. Pope Pius IX beatified him on 10 February 1867 after the recognition of two miracles attributed to his intercession.
