= 1631 =

1631 in various calendars
- Gregorian calendar: 1631; MDCXXXI
- Ab urbe condita: 2384
- Armenian calendar: 1080; ԹՎ ՌՁ
- Assyrian calendar: 6381
- Balinese saka calendar: 1552–1553
- Bengali calendar: 1037–1038
- Berber calendar: 2581
- English Regnal year: 6 Cha. 1 – 7 Cha. 1
- Buddhist calendar: 2175
- Burmese calendar: 993
- Byzantine calendar: 7139–7140
- Chinese calendar: 庚午年 (Metal Horse); 4328 or 4121 — to — 辛未年 (Metal Goat); 4329 or 4122
- Coptic calendar: 1347–1348
- Discordian calendar: 2797
- Ethiopian calendar: 1623–1624
- Hebrew calendar: 5391–5392
- Hindu calendars
- Vikram Samvat: 1687–1688
- Shaka Samvat: 1552–1553
- Kali Yuga: 4731–4732
- Holocene calendar: 11631
- Igbo calendar: 631–632
- Iranian calendar: 1009–1010
- Islamic calendar: 1040–1041
- Japanese calendar: Kan'ei 8 (寛永８年)
- Javanese calendar: 1552–1553
- Julian calendar: Gregorian minus 10 days
- Korean calendar: 3964
- Minguo calendar: 281 before ROC 民前281年
- Nanakshahi calendar: 163
- Thai solar calendar: 2173–2174
- Tibetan calendar: ལྕགས་ཕོ་རྟ་ལོ་ (male Iron-Horse); 1757 or 1376 or 604 — to — ལྕགས་མོ་ལུག་ལོ་ (female Iron-Sheep); 1758 or 1377 or 605

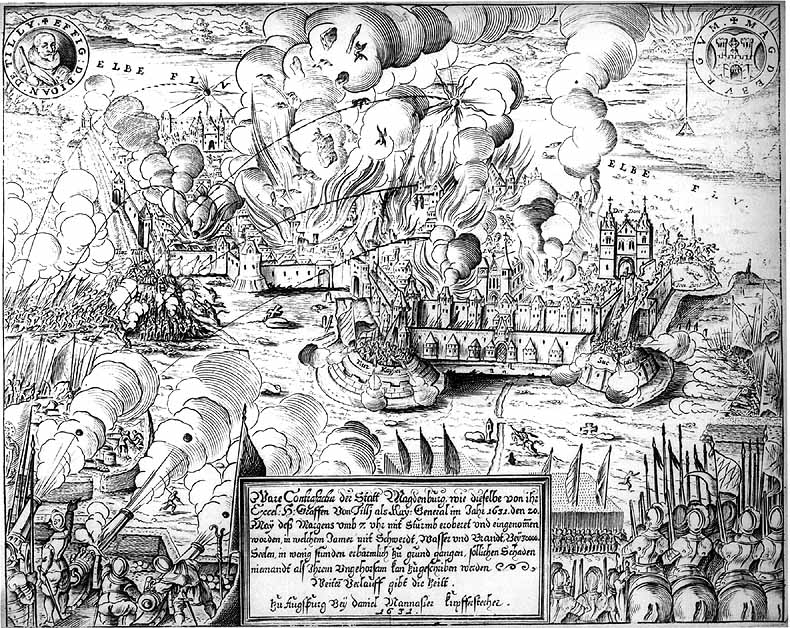
May 20: The city of Magdeburg is sacked by the Imperial Army of the Holy Roman Emperor and 20,000 residents are killed

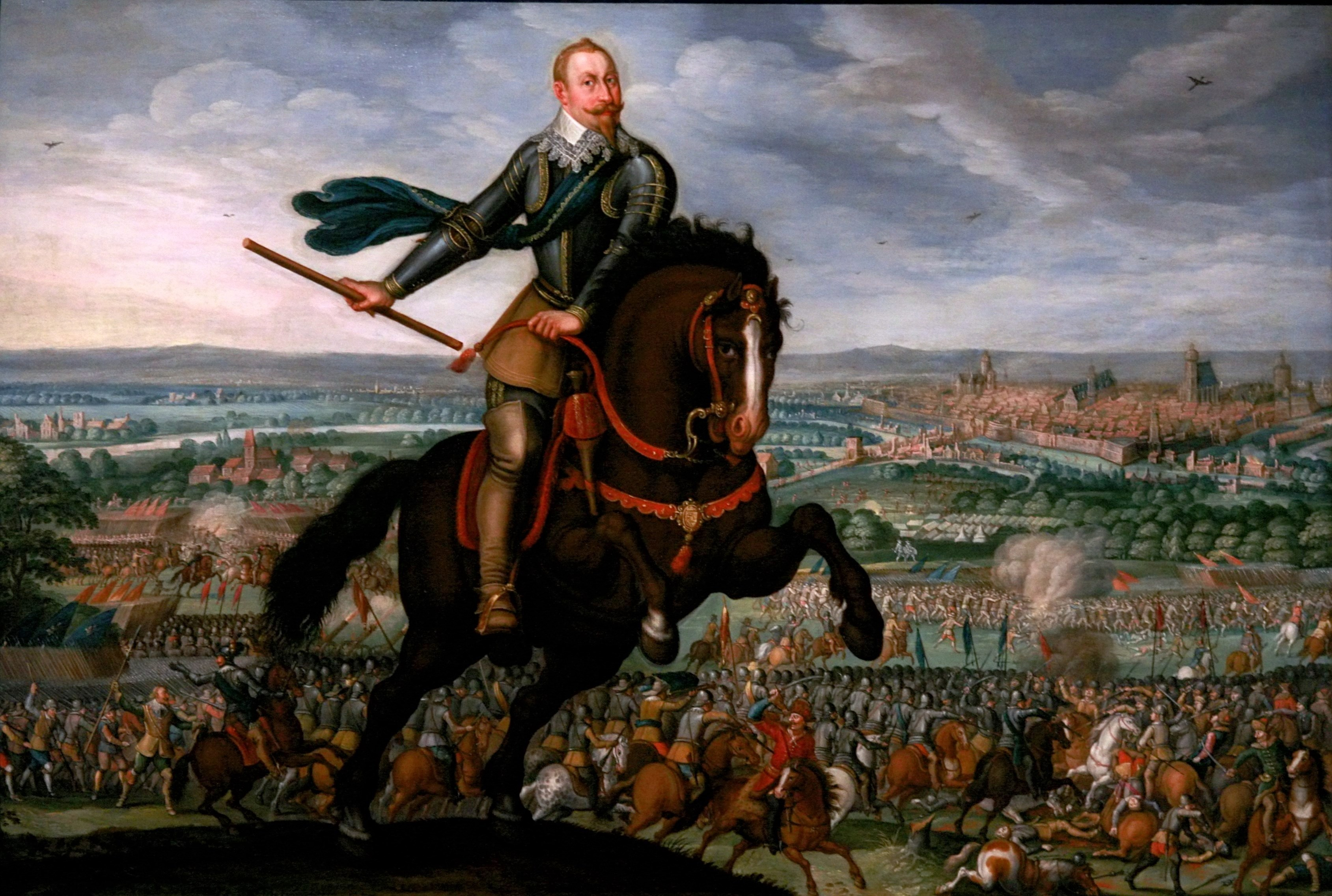
September 17: The first Protestant victory in the Thirty Years' War is accomplished by Sweden at the Battle of Breitenfeld, almost four months after Tilly's massacre of Protestants at Magdeburg.

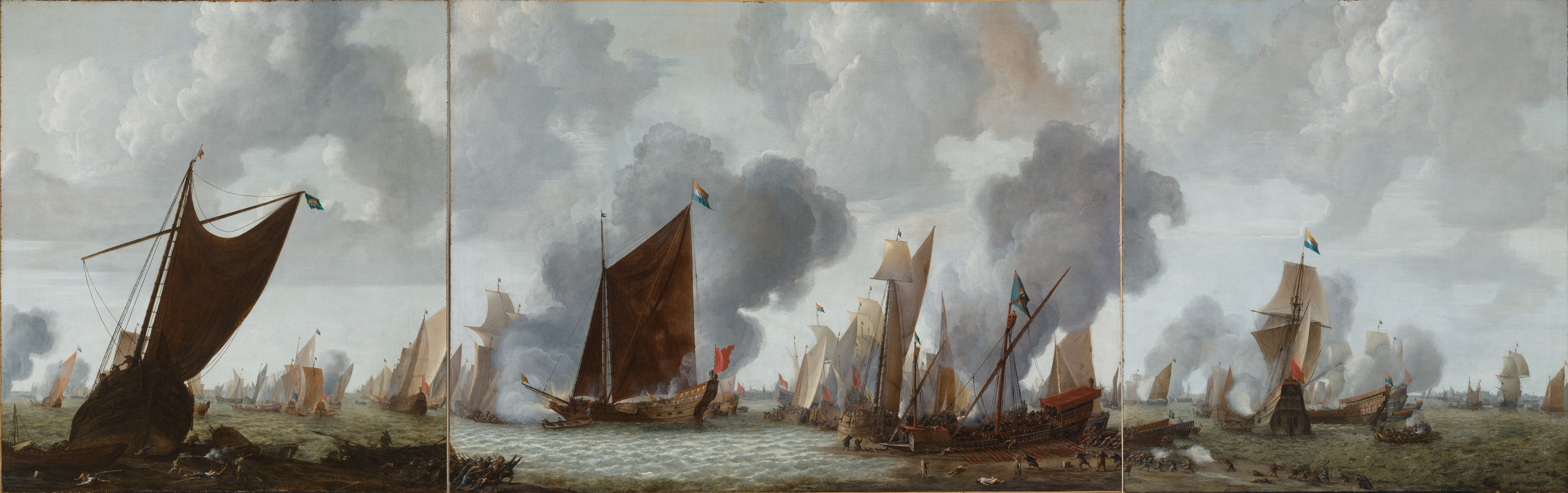
September 12–13: The Netherlands sinks 83 Spanish ships in the Battle of the Slaak.

1631 (MDCXXXI) was a common year starting on Wednesday of the Gregorian calendar and a common year starting on Saturday of the Julian calendar, the 1631st year of the Common Era (CE) and Anno Domini (AD) designations, the 631st year of the 2nd millennium, the 31st year of the 17th century, and the 2nd year of the 1630s decade. As of the start of 1631, the Gregorian calendar was 10 days ahead of the Julian calendar, which remained in localized use until 1923.

== Events ==
=== January–March ===
- January 23 – Thirty Years' War: Sweden and France sign the Treaty of Bärwalde, a military alliance in which France provides funds for the Swedish army invading northern Germany.
- February 5 – Puritan leader Roger Williams arrives in Boston.
- February 16 – The Reval Gymnasium is founded in Tallinn, Estonia, by Swedish king Gustavus II Adolphus.
- February 20 – A fire breaks out in Westminster Hall, but is put out before it can cause serious destruction.
- March 7 – Ambrósio I Nimi a Nkanga, the ruler of the Kingdom of Kongo (in what is now Angola) dies after a reign of five years.
- March 10 – Al Walid ben Zidan becomes the new Sultan of Morocco upon the death of Abu Marwan Abd al-Malik II.
- March 20 – The siege of the Protestant German city of Magdeburg by the Catholic League begins and lasts for more than two months before the city falls and the inhabitants are massacred.

=== April–June ===
- April 13 – Thirty Years' War: Gustavus Adolphus of Sweden defeats an imperial garrison at the city of Frankfurt an der Oder.
- May 18 – In Dorchester, Boston, John Winthrop takes the oath of office, and becomes the first Governor of Massachusetts.
- May 20 – Thirty Years' War: After a two-month siege, the Imperial Army of the Holy Roman Emperor, under the command of Johann Tserclaes, Count of Tilly sacks the Protestant German city of Magdeburg, and massacres over 20,000 inhabitants. Shocked by the massacre, many Protestant states in the Holy Roman Empire decide to ally with Gustavus Adolphus of Sweden, and support his ongoing invasion.
- May 28 – William Claiborne sails from England to establish a trading post on Kent Island, the first English settlement in Maryland.
- May 30
  - Thirty Years' War: Bavaria and France sign the Treaty of Fontainebleau, forming a secret alliance; however, this does not last long.
  - Gazette de France, the first weekly French newspaper, is published.
- June 17 – The death in childbirth of Mumtaz Mahal at Burhanpur causes her husband Shah Jahan to commission the Taj Mahal at Agra, as a mausoleum for her. Construction is started in 1632, and finished in 1653.
- June 19 – War of the Mantuan Succession: The Treaty of Cherasco is signed, ending the War of the Mantuan Succession.
- June 20 – Algerian pirates sack Baltimore, County Cork, in Ireland.

=== July–September ===
- July 9 – Koca Musa Pasha, the Ottoman Governor of Egypt, arranges the murder of Emir Kitas Bey, commander of Turkish troops who had been scheduled to invade Persia.
- July 16 – The city of Würzburg is taken by Gustavus Adolphus of Sweden, putting an end to the Würzburg witch trials, but not before an estimated 900 people from the city and its environs have been burned at the stake for witchcraft.
- July 22 – Thirty Years' War – Battle of Werben: Tilly defeats Gustavus Adolphus of Sweden, but not decisively.
- August 22 – The Treaty of Werben is signed as an alliance between Hesse-Cassel and Sweden.
- August 29 – (1 Safar 1041 A.H.) Abd Allah ibn Hasan, Emir of Mecca, abdicates in favor of two successors, his son Muhammad ibn Abd Allah and his great-nephew Zayd ibn Muhsin.
- August – Thirty Years' War: Running out of supplies, Tilly is forced to send his army into the Electorate of Saxony in order to secure supplies, as well as to force a reaction from John George, Elector of Saxony and Gustavus Adolphus of Sweden.
- August – The Martyrs of Mombasa were a group of approximately 288 Christians, Portuguese and African, killed in Mombasa (in present-day Kenya) in August 1631 during an uprising led by Yusuf ibn al-Hasan, the Swahili sultan of Mombasa.
- September 11 – Thirty Years' War: As a result of Tilly's invasion, John George, Elector of Saxony, who has until now stayed neutral, allies with Gustavus Adolphus of Sweden, in order to drive the Imperial army out of Saxony.
- September 12 – Eighty Years' War – Battle of Albrolhos: A Spanish fleet, under the command of Admiral Antonio de Oquendo, defeats a Dutch fleet off the coast of Brazil.
- September 13– Eighty Years' War – Battle of the Slaak: A Spanish fleet of 95 ships, carrying 5,500 soldiers tasked with taking over the Dutch Republic, is almost completely destroyed (with 83 ships sunk) the day after being intercepted by a Dutch fleet off of the coast of the Netherlands.
- September 17 – Thirty Years' War – Battle of Breitenfeld: Tilly's Holy Roman Imperial army is decisively defeated by Gustavus II Adolphus of Sweden, shattering the imperial army of the Holy Roman Empire, and marking the first significant victory for the Protestants in the war.

=== October–December ===
- October 10 – Thirty Years' War: A Saxon army takes over Prague.
- November 15 – King Gustavus Adolphus of Sweden takes possession of Prague, capital of Bohemia.
- November 21 – In Venice, a special mass celebrates the end of the two years of bubonic plague that had killed thousands of people.
- November 29 – The Treaty of Höchst is signed between King Gustavus Adolphus of Sweden and George II of Hesse-Darmstadt, with Darmstadt giving up the fortress of Rüsselsheim in return for Sweden's recognition of Darmstadt's neutrality.
- December 16 – A volcanic eruption of Mount Vesuvius at Pompeii occurs, for the first time in several centuries.
- December 23 – Thirty Years' War: Gustavus II Adolphus of Sweden takes the city of Mainz, without any resistance.

=== Date unknown ===
- Publication of
  - Moses Amyraut's Traite des Religions.
  - Antonio Colmenero de Ledesma's Chocolate: or, An Indian Drinke.

== Births ==
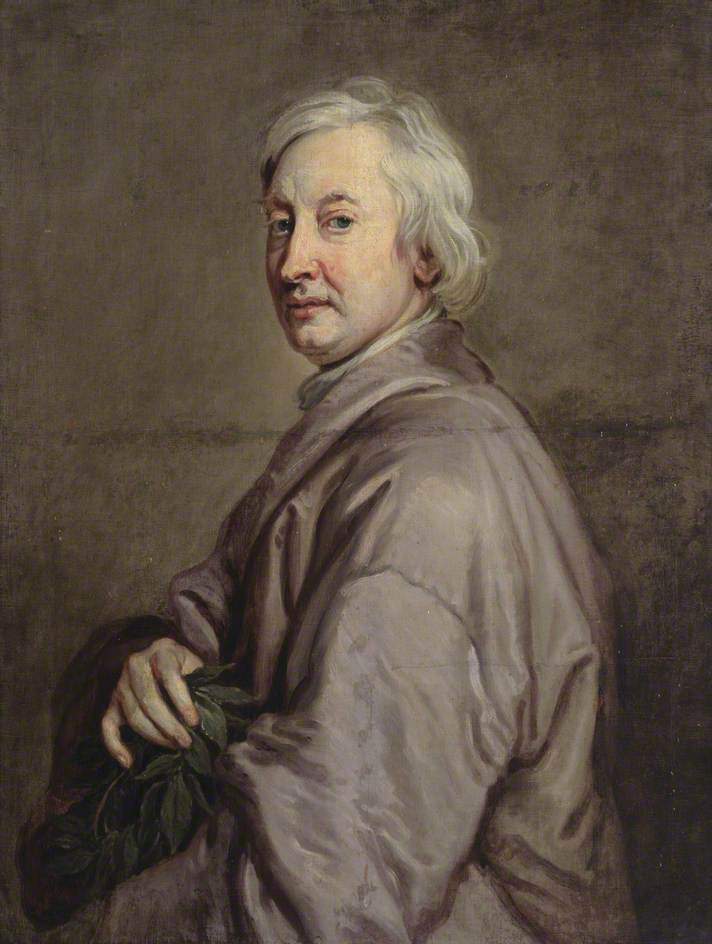
John Dryden

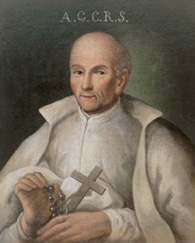
Stanislaus Papczyński

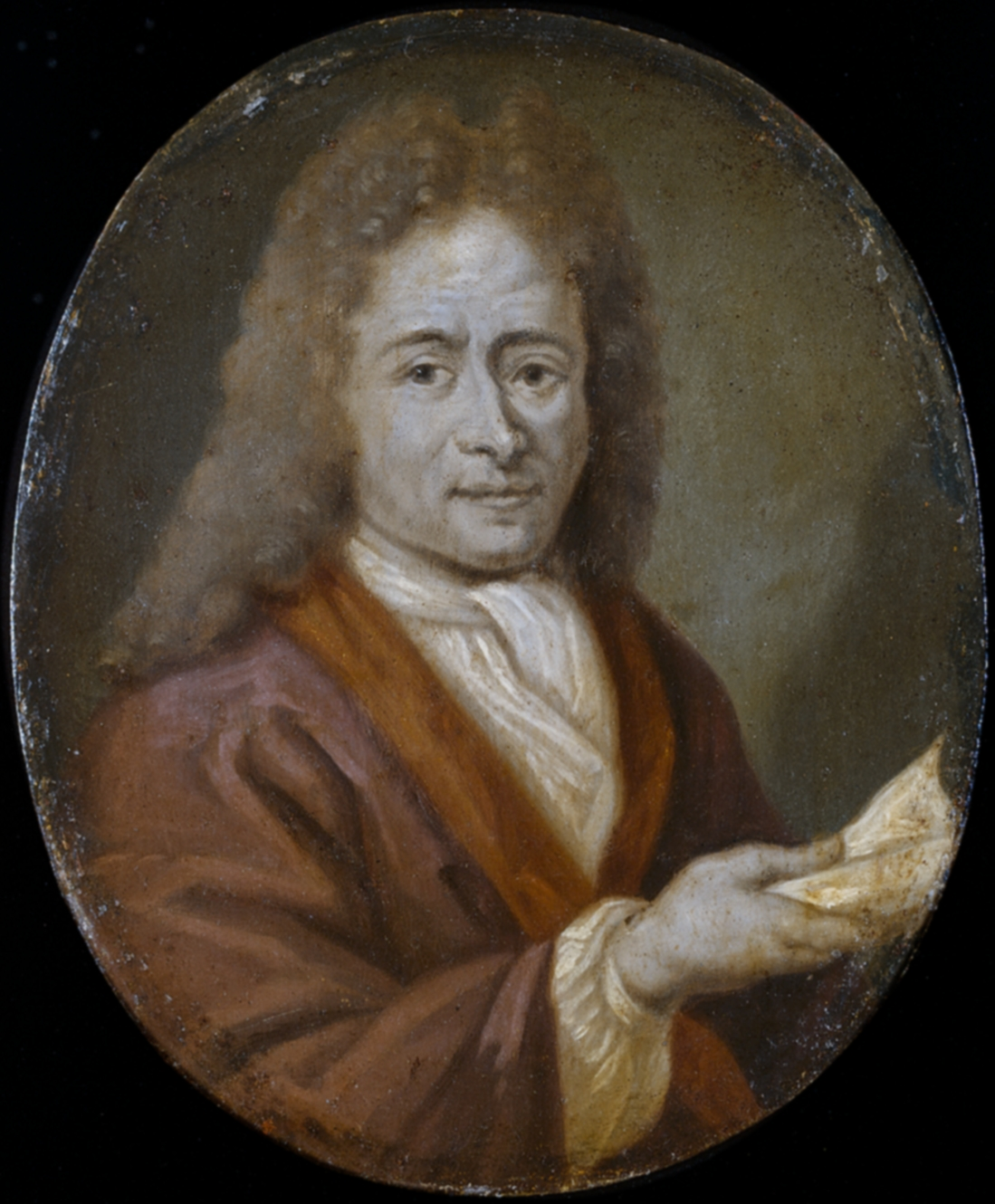
Christoffel Pierson

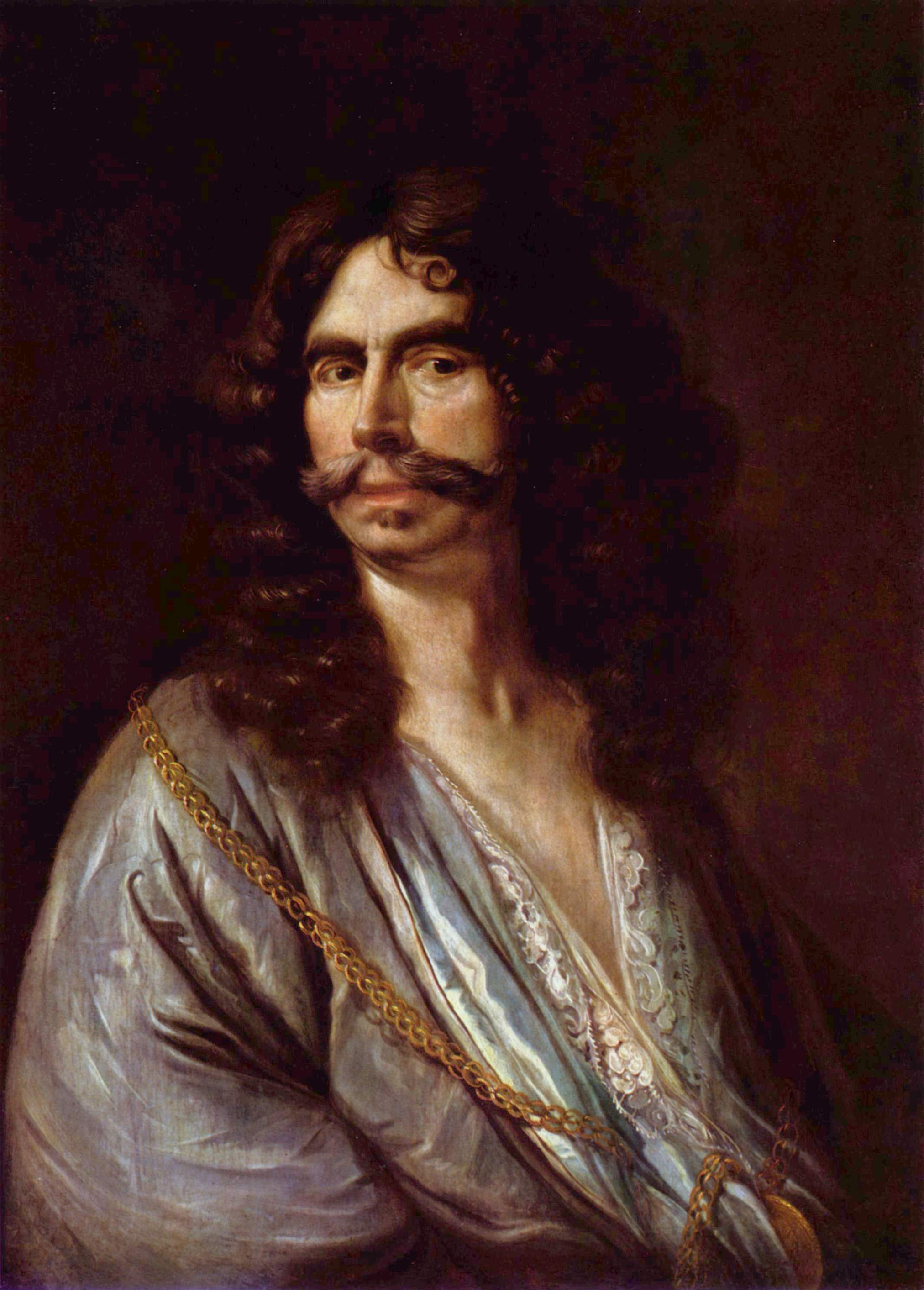
Johann Heinrich Roos

=== January–March ===
- January 1 or 1632 – Katherine Philips, Anglo-Welsh poet (d. 1664)
- January 2 – Anthonie van Borssom, Dutch painter (d. 1677)
- January 6 – Anne Hamilton, 3rd Duchess of Hamilton, Scottish peeress (d. 1716)
- January 12 – Hasanuddin of Gowa, 16th Ruler of The Sultanate of Gowa (d. 1670)
- January 23 – Vincent Houdry, French Jesuit preacher and writer on ascetics (d. 1729)
- February 6 – Edward Abney, English politician (d. 1727)
- February 10 – Louise of Anhalt-Dessau, Duchess suo jure of Oława and Wołów (1672–1680) (d. 1680)
- February 22 – Peder Syv, Danish historian (d. 1702)
- March 3 – Esaias Boursse, Dutch painter (d. 1672)
- March 9 – Claude-François Ménestrier, French heraldist, Jesuit, courtier (d. 1705)
- March 13 – Lodewijck Huygens, Dutch diplomat (d. 1699)
- March 16 – René Le Bossu, French critic (d. 1680)

=== April–June ===
- April 8 – Cornelis de Heem, Dutch painter (d. 1695)
- April 15
  - Piero de Bonzi, Italian Catholic cardinal (d. 1703)
  - Walter Vincent, English politician (d. 1680)
- April 21 – Francesco Maidalchini, Italian Catholic cardinal (d. 1700)
- April 29 – Joseph Bridger, Colonial Governor of Virginia (d. 1686)
- May 2 – John Murray, 1st Marquess of Atholl (d. 1703)
- May 4 – William Brereton, 3rd Baron Brereton, English politician (d. 1680)
- May 10 – Flavio Chigi, Italian Catholic cardinal (d. 1693)
- May 18 – Stanislaus Papczyński, Polish priest (d. 1701)
- May 19 – Christoffel Pierson, Dutch painter (d. 1714)
- May 28 – Louis André, French Jesuit priest, missionary and translator (d. 1715)
- May 29 – Robert Paston, 1st Earl of Yarmouth, English politician, earl (d. 1683)
- June 13 – Gilbert Hay, 11th Earl of Erroll, Scottish noble (d. 1674)
- June 17 – Gauharara Begum, Mughal noblewoman (d. 1706)
- June 22 – Francis Rombouts, Dutch Mayor of New York City (d. 1691)
- June 25 – António das Chagas, Portuguese Franciscan friar and ascetical writer (d. 1682)
- June 26 – Vincenzo Albrici, Italian composer (d. 1695)

=== July–September ===
- July 4 – John Roettiers, English engraver (d. 1703)
- July 15
  - Richard Cumberland, English philosopher (d. 1718)
  - Jens Juel, Danish diplomat (d. 1700)
- August 5 – Adam Adamandy Kochański, Polish mathematician (d. 1700)
- August 7 – Nicholas Tufton, 3rd Earl of Thanet, England (d. 1679)
- August 19
  - Maffeo Barberini, Prince of Palestrina (d. 1685)
  - John Dryden, English writer (d. 1700)
- August 24 – Philip Henry, English minister (d. 1696)
- August 29 – Henry Noris, Italian Catholic cardinal (d. 1704)
- September 1 – Anne Crawford-Lindsay, Scottish noblewoman (d. 1689)
- September 6 – Charles Porter, English-born judge (d. 1696)
- September 29
  - Richard Edlin, English astrologer (d. 1677)
  - Johann Heinrich Roos, Dutch painter (d. 1685)

=== October–December ===
- October 1
  - Toussaint de Forbin-Janson, French Catholic cardinal and Bishop of Beauvais (d. 1713)
  - Eugene Maximilian, Prince of Hornes (d. 1709)
- October 3 – Sebastian Anton Scherer, German organist and composer (d. 1712)
- October 6 – Emmanuel, Prince of Anhalt-Köthen, German prince of the House of Ascania (d. 1670)
- October 12 – George Saunderson, 5th Viscount Castleton, English Member of Parliament (d. 1714)
- October 13 – Richard Hampden, English politician (d. 1695)
- October 18
  - Heinrich Müller, German theologian and writer (d. 1675)
  - Michael Wigglesworth, American Puritan minister (d. 1705)
- October 22 – Gilles Boileau, French translator (d. 1669)
- October 26 – Leopold Karl von Kollonitsch, Hungarian Catholic cardinal (d. 1707)
- October 30 – Pierre Beauchamp, French choreographer, dancer and composer (d. 1705)
- November 4 – Mary, Princess Royal and Princess of Orange (d. 1660)
- November 10 – Daniel Harvey, English merchant and politician (d. 1672)
- November 17 – Marco d'Aviano, Italian Capuchin friar (d. 1699)
- November 21 – Catharina Questiers, Dutch poet (d. 1669)
- November 28 – Abraham Brueghel, Flemish Baroque painter (d. 1690)
- December 14 – Anne Conway, English philosopher (d. 1679)
- December 24
  - Bernhard Gustav of Baden-Durlach, Swedish general, Prince-Abbot of Fulda and Kempten, and cardinal (d. 1677)
  - Gabrielle Suchon, French Catholic moral philosopher, feminist (d. 1703)

=== Date unknown ===
- Joaquim Juncosa, Carthusian monk and Baroque painter (d. 1708)
- Klara Izabella Pacowa, politically active Polish court official (d. 1685)
- William Stoughton, American judge at the Salem witch trials (d. 1701)

== Deaths ==
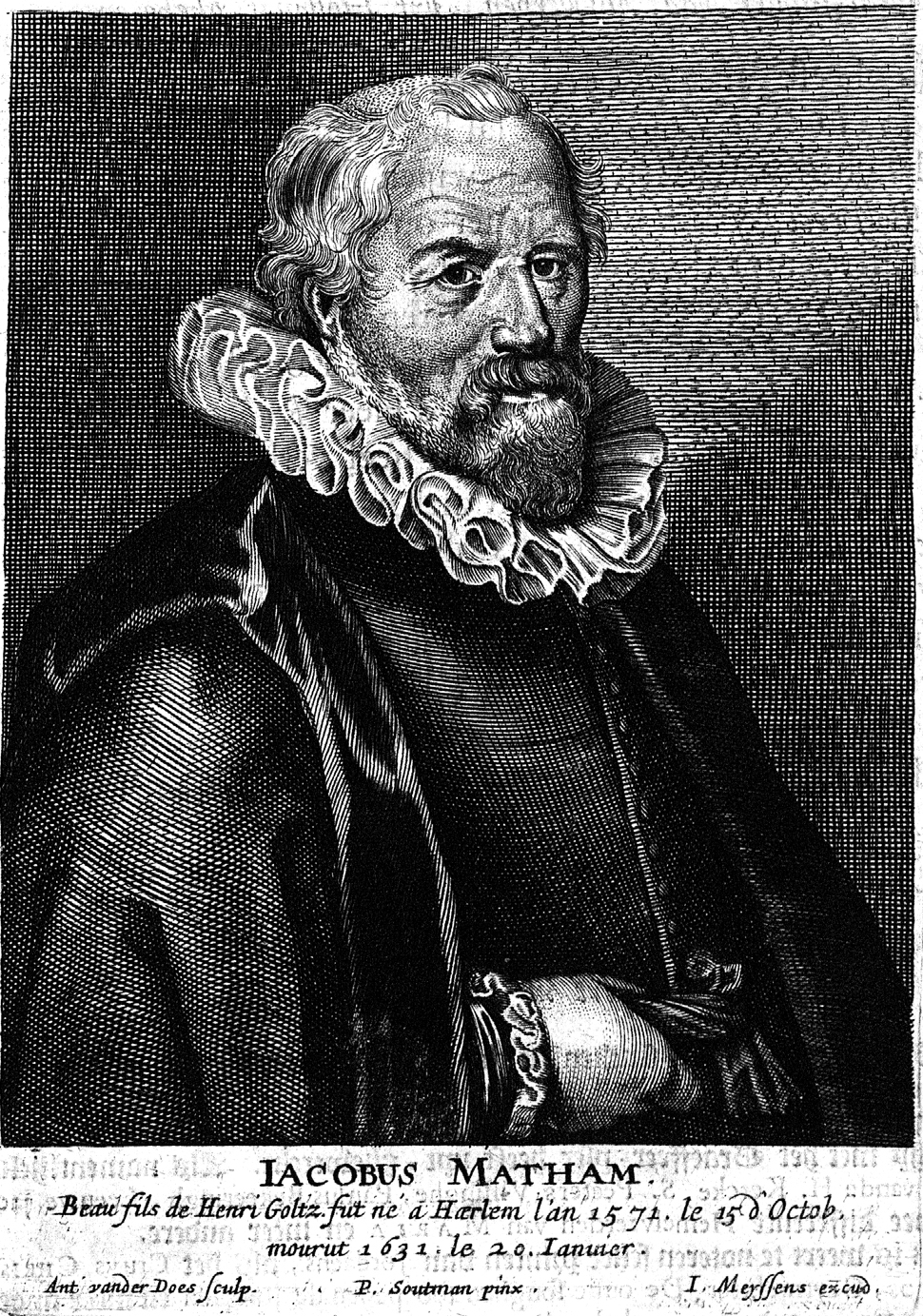
Jacob Matham

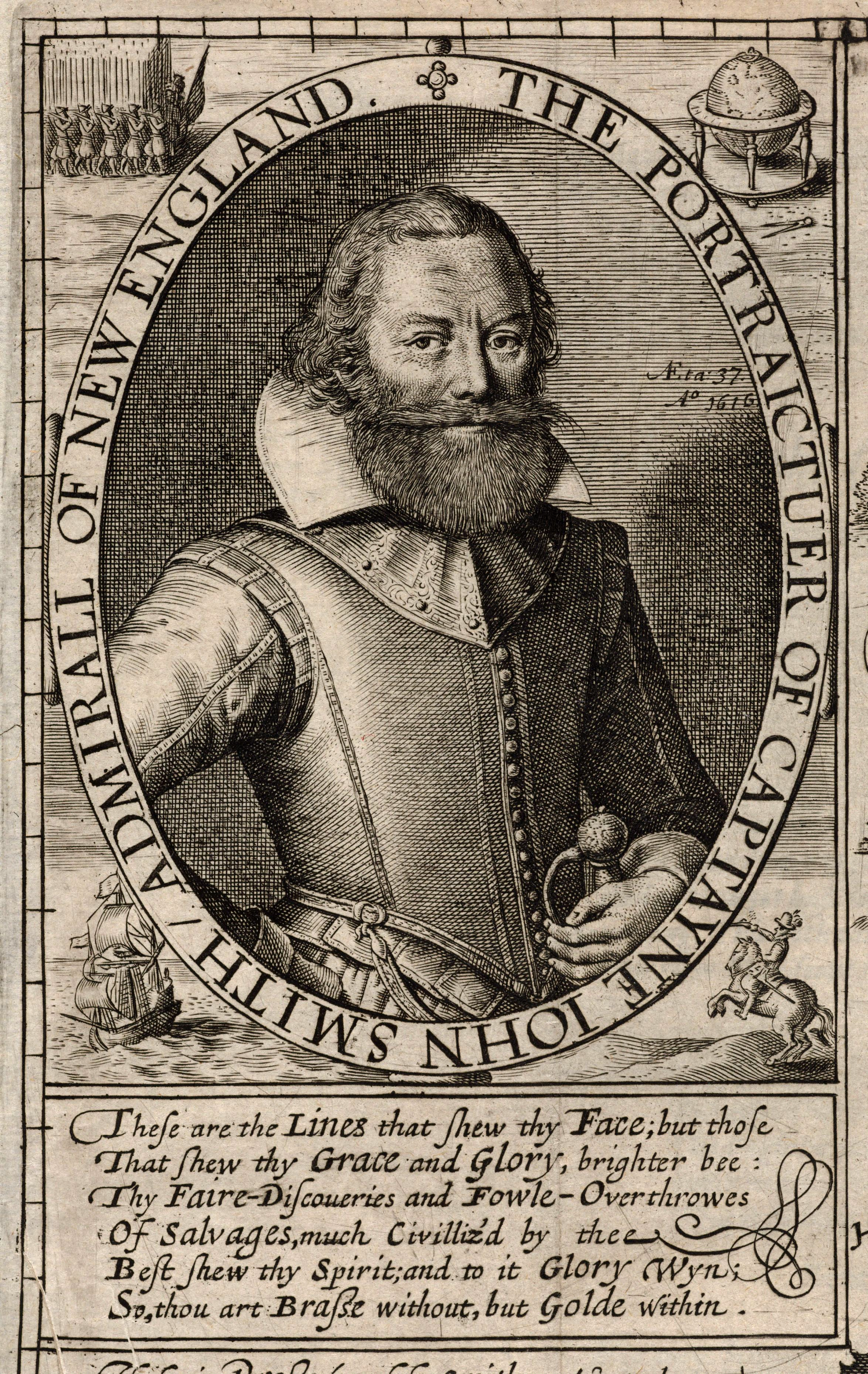
John Smith

- January 1 – Thomas Hobson, English carrier and origin of the phrase "Hobson's choice" (b. 1544)
- January 3 – Michelagnolo Galilei, Italian composer and lutenist, younger brother of Galileo Galilei (b. 1575)
- January 14 – Charlotte of the Palatinate, German noble (b. 1628)
- January 20 – Jacob Matham, Dutch artist (b. 1571)
- January 26 – Louis Frederick, Duke of Württemberg-Montbéliard (1617–1631) (b. 1586)
- January 30 – Sophie Hedwig of Brunswick-Wolfenbüttel, duchess consort of Pomerania-Wolgast (1577–1592) (b. 1561)
- February 7 – Gabriel Harvey, English writer (b. c. 1552/3)
- February 14 – Tsugaru Nobuhira, Japanese daimyō (b. 1586)
- March 24 – Philipp Dulichius, German composer (b. 1562)
- March 31 – John Donne, English writer and prelate (b. 1572)
- March 28 – Juan van der Hamen, Spanish artist (b. 1596)
- April 2 – Nicolò Contarini, Doge of Venice (b. 1553)
- April 5 – Sinibaldo Scorza, Italian painter (b. 1589)
- April 23 – Francesco Maria II della Rovere, last Duke of Urbino (b. 1549)
- May 6 – Sir Robert Cotton, 1st Baronet, of Connington, English politician (b. 1570)
- May 26 – Enrico Caterino Davila, Italian historian and diplomat (b. 1576)
- June 17 – Mumtaz Mahal, favorite wife of Shah Jahan (b. 1593)
- June 18 – Robert Payne, English politician (b. 1573)
- June 21 – John Smith (explorer), English soldier and colonist (b. 1580)
- July 16 – Francis Hay, 9th Earl of Erroll, Scottish noble (b. 1564)
- July 19 – Cesare Cremonini, Italian philosopher (b. 1550)
- July 28 – Guillén de Castro y Bellvis, Spanish dramatist (b. 1569)
- August 3 – Kim Jang-saeng, Korean scholar and writer (b. 1548)
- August 8 – Konstantinas Sirvydas, Lithuanian religious leader (b. 1579)
- September 6 – Honda Tadamasa, Japanese daimyō (b. 1575)
- September 18 – Countess Palatine Dorothea of Simmern (b. 1581)
- September 21 – Federico Borromeo, Cardinal Archbishop of Milan (b. 1564)
- October 14 – Sophie of Mecklenburg-Güstrow, queen and regent of Denmark (b. 1557)
- October 20 – Michael Maestlin, German astronomer and mathematician (b. 1550)
- October 26 – Catherine de Parthenay, French noblewoman and mathematician (b. 1554)
- October 28 – Sir Richard Beaumont, 1st Baronet, English politician (b. 1574)
- November 1 – Archduchess Maria Maddalena of Austria (b. 1589)
- November 7 – Patrick Fleming, Irish Franciscan friar and scholar (murdered) (b. 1599)
- November 29 – Edmond Richer, French theologian (b. 1559)
- December 5 – Tommaso Caracciolo, Field Marshal of Spanish forces in the Thirty Years' War (b. 1572)
- December 7 – Johannes Hartmann, German chemist (b. 1568)
- December 9 – Liborius Wagner, German Roman Catholic priest (b. 1593)
- December 10 – Hugh Myddelton, Welsh businessman (b. 1560)
- December 23 – Michael Drayton, English poet (b. 1563)
- December 30 – Frederick Achilles, Duke of Württemberg-Neuenstadt (b. 1591)
