= Davenant =

Davenant is a surname, and may refer to:

- Charles Davenant (1656–1714), English economist, son of William Davenant
- John Davenant (1572–1641), English academic and bishop
- Ralph Davenant (fl. 1680), English clergyman
- Thomas Davenant (died 1697), English MP for Eye
- William Davenant (c. 1606–1668), English poet

Davenant may also refer to:

- Davenant Foundation School, school in Essex, UK, founded by Ralph Davenant
- Davenant International, student forum
- Davenant Centre, community centre in Whitechapel, London
- Hain-Davenant, fictional planet from Ursula K. LeGuin's Hainish Cycle of novels
