= 1680 =

1680 in various calendars
- Gregorian calendar: 1680; MDCLXXX
- Ab urbe condita: 2433
- Armenian calendar: 1129; ԹՎ ՌՃԻԹ
- Assyrian calendar: 6430
- Balinese saka calendar: 1601–1602
- Bengali calendar: 1086–1087
- Berber calendar: 2630
- English Regnal year: 31 Cha. 2 – 32 Cha. 2
- Buddhist calendar: 2224
- Burmese calendar: 1042
- Byzantine calendar: 7188–7189
- Chinese calendar: 己未年 (Earth Goat); 4377 or 4170 — to — 庚申年 (Metal Monkey); 4378 or 4171
- Coptic calendar: 1396–1397
- Discordian calendar: 2846
- Ethiopian calendar: 1672–1673
- Hebrew calendar: 5440–5441
- Hindu calendars
- Vikram Samvat: 1736–1737
- Shaka Samvat: 1601–1602
- Kali Yuga: 4780–4781
- Holocene calendar: 11680
- Igbo calendar: 680–681
- Iranian calendar: 1058–1059
- Islamic calendar: 1090–1091
- Japanese calendar: Enpō 8 (延宝８年)
- Javanese calendar: 1602–1603
- Julian calendar: Gregorian minus 10 days
- Korean calendar: 4013
- Minguo calendar: 232 before ROC 民前232年
- Nanakshahi calendar: 212
- Thai solar calendar: 2222–2223
- Tibetan calendar: ས་མོ་ལུག་ལོ་ (female Earth-Sheep); 1806 or 1425 or 653 — to — ལྕགས་ཕོ་སྤྲེ་ལོ་ (male Iron-Monkey); 1807 or 1426 or 654

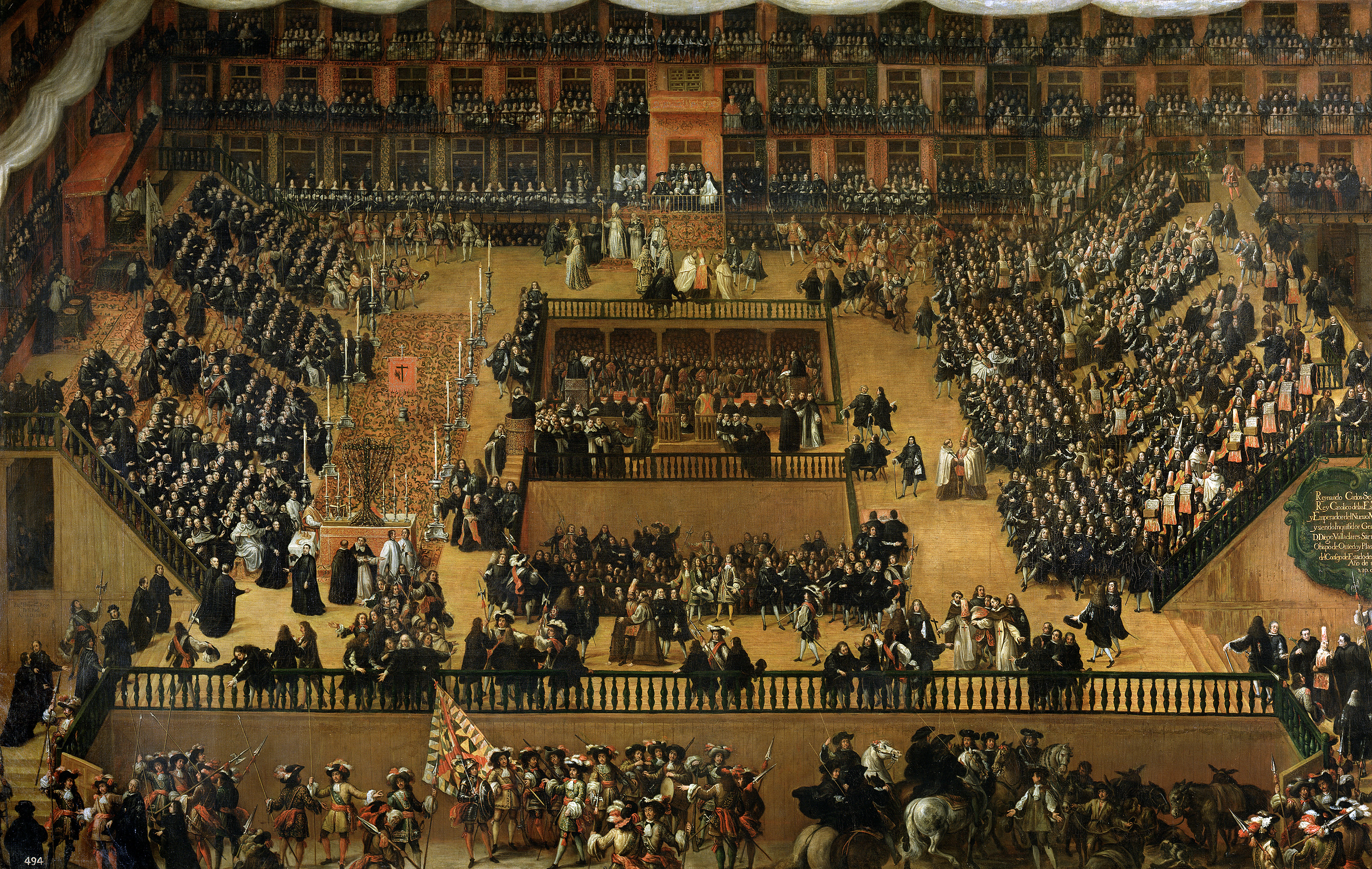
June 30: Auto-da-fé takes place in Madrid (1683 painting by Francisco Rizi

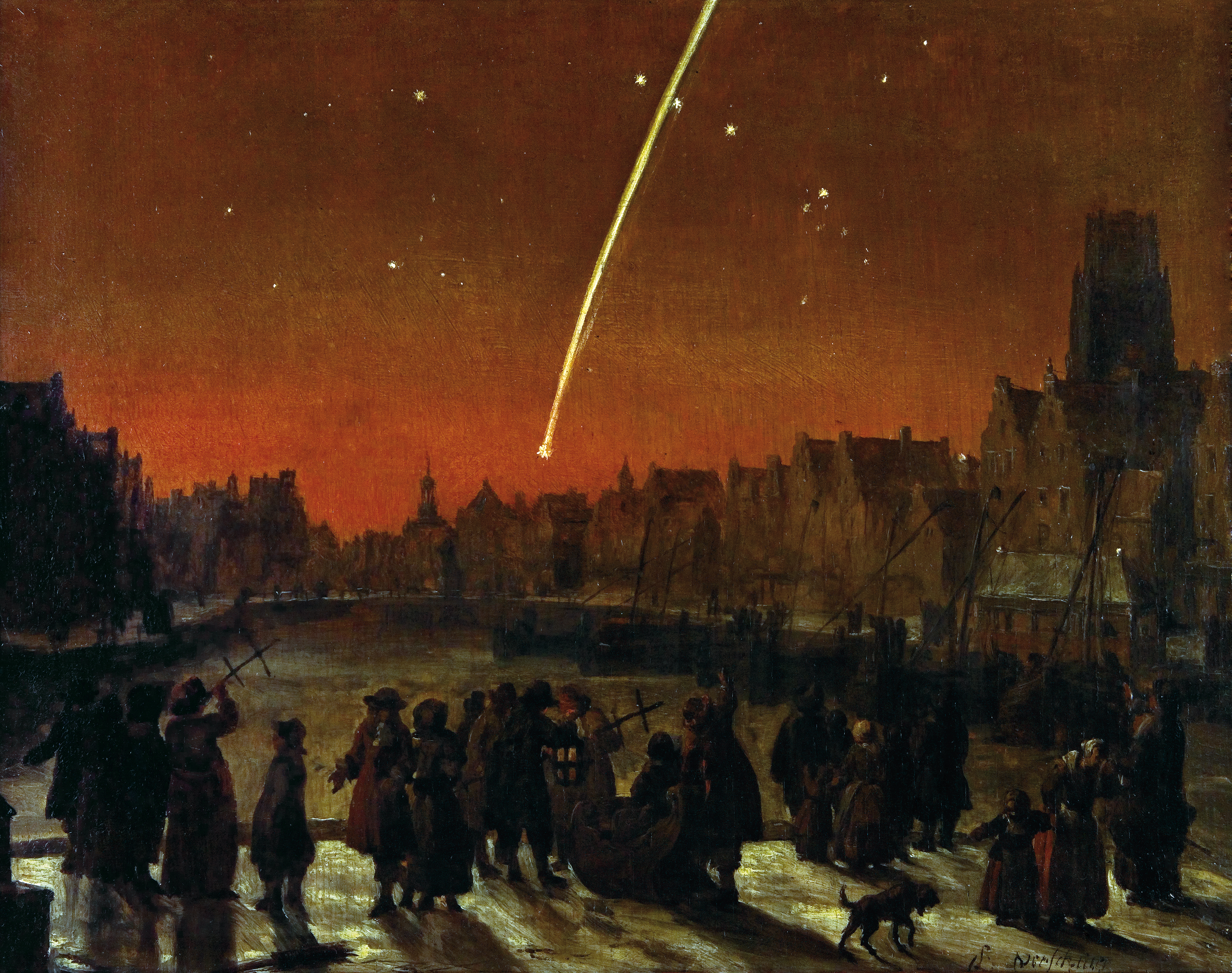
November 14: The Great Comet of 1680 is first sighted.

1680 (MDCLXXX) was a leap year starting on Monday of the Gregorian calendar and a leap year starting on Thursday of the Julian calendar, the 1680th year of the Common Era (CE) and Anno Domini (AD) designations, the 680th year of the 2nd millennium, the 80th year of the 17th century, and the 1st year of the 1680s decade. As of the start of 1680, the Gregorian calendar was 10 days ahead of the Julian calendar, which remained in localized use until 1923.

== Events ==
=== January–March ===
- January 2 – King Amangkurat II of Mataram (located on the island of Java, part of modern-day Indonesia), invites Trunajaya, who had led a failed rebellion against him until his surrender on December 26, for a ceremonial visit to the royal palace. After Trunajaya arrives, King Amangkurat stabs his guest to death.
- January 24 – William Harris, one of the four English Puritans who established the Plymouth Colony and then the Providence Plantations at Rhode Island in 1636, is captured by Algerian pirates, when his ship is boarded while he is making a voyage back to England. After being sold into slavery on February 23, he remains a slave until ransom is paid. He dies in 1681, three days after his return to England.
- February 12 – The Marquis de Croissy, Charles Colbert, becomes France's Minister of Foreign Affairs and serves for 16 years until his death, when he is succeeded as Foreign Minister by his son Jean-Baptiste Colbert.
- February 16 – Rev. Ralph Davenant's will provides for foundation of the Davenant Foundation School for poor boys in Whitechapel, in the East End of London.
- February 22 – Catherine Deshayes Monvoisin, a fortune teller in France who organized a ring of killers in what became known as the "Affair of the Poisons" that killed at least 1,000 people, is burned at the stake after being convicted of witchcraft. In all, 36 people are executed for their role in the poisoning.
- February 24 – The German Duchy of Saxe-Coburg is divided by treaty among the sons of the late Ernest I, Duke of Saxe-Gotha, who had died in 1675. The oldest son, Frederick, receives Saxe-Gotha-Altenburg. The rest is divided among Albert (Duke of Saxe-Coburg); Bernhard (Saxe-Meiningen); Henry (Saxe-Römhild); Christian (Saxe-Eisenberg); Ernest (Saxe-Hildburghausen); and John Ernest (Saxe-Coburg-Saalfeld).
- March 24 – The Earl of Shaftesbury informs the Privy Council of England that the Roman Catholics of Ireland were about to launch a rebellion, backed by France. The investigation leads to the arrest and ultimate execution of the Roman Catholic Archbishop of Armagh, Oliver Plunkett.
- March 25 – Troops sent by the Sultan of Morocco, Ismail Ibn Sharif, begin a blockade of the port of Tangier, occupied by the English and located on the North African coast. Palmes Fairborne is dispatched to defend Tangier as the colonial governor and commander-in-chief of English forces.
- March 27 – The London Penny Post delivery service begins operations after being created by Robert Murray and William Dockwra, with a policy of delivering letters to any part of London or its suburbs for the price of one English penny.
- March 30 – A total eclipse of the Sun takes place and is visible over central Africa, with totality over the Opala Territory in the modern-day Democratic Republic of the Congo.

=== April–June ===
- April 21 – Prince Rajaram Bhosle, the 10-year-old son of the Shivaji, the Chhatrapati (Emperor) of the Maratha Empire in India, is installed on the throne as the new Emperor, less than three weeks after the death of his father. Sambhaji Bhosle, the eldest son of Shivaji, learns the news while imprisoned at Panhala and makes plans to escape prison and take over the throne.
- April 27 – Prince Sambhaji and fellow prisoners kill the commander of the Panhala prison and take control of the fort, as he makes plans to become ruler of the Maratha Empire.
- April 30 – The first French Huguenots in the New World arrive at Charleston, South Carolina, as 45 of the religious exiles arrive at Oyster Point on the ship Richmond, after being sent there by King Charles II of England.
- May 6 – King Charles XI of Sweden marries Princess Elonora, daughter of the late King Frederick III of Denmark-Norway and sister of King Christian V.
- May – The volcano Krakatoa erupts, probably on a relatively small scale.
- June 4 – Tokugawa Tsunayoshi becomes the new Shōgun of Japan upon the death of his older brother, Tokugawa Ietsuna, who had been shōgun for 29 years.
- June 10 – England and Spain sign a mutual defense treaty.
- June 11 – Elizabeth Cellier, an English Catholic midwife, is tried and acquitted of treason for pamphleting against the government.
- June 16 – Sambhaji Bhosle and his troops capture Raigad, the capital of the Maratha Empire and Sambhaji becomes the new Chhatrapati or Emperor. Sambhaji deposes his younger brother Rajaram I and places Rajaram and Rajaram's mother under house arrest.
- June 22 – The Sanquhar Declaration, written by Richard Cameron, leader of the Covenanters who oppose the control of religion in Scotland by King Charles, is read aloud by Richard's brother Michael Cameron at the public square in the village of Sanquhar in Dumfriesshire.
- June 30 – During the Spanish Inquisition, an auto-da-fé takes place in the Plaza Mayor, Madrid.

=== July–September ===
- July 8 – The first documented tornado in America kills a servant at Cambridge, Massachusetts.
- August 10 – A Pueblo medicine man named Popé begins an attack by the Puebloans and their Apache allies on Spanish outposts throughout what is the modern-day U.S. state of New Mexico, choosing the campaign to begin before a supply caravan can reach the Spaniards.
- August 20 (August 10 Old Style) – The settlement of Karlskrona in Sweden is founded, as the Royal Swedish Navy relocates there.
- August 21 – In the Pueblo Revolt, the native Pueblo people capture Santa Fe (now in New Mexico) from the Spanish colonists.
- August 24 – Comédie-Française is founded by decree of Louis XIV as La maison de Molière in Paris.
- September 11 – Emperor Go-Mizunoo spent his later years in relative seclusion as a retired emperor, continuing to participate in courtly and cultural activities until his passing away.
- September 15
  - A four month truce between England and Morocco expires and the Alcaid Omar, Viceroy of Morocco, begins a bombardment of the English fort at Tangier.
  - A treaty is concluded between the Dutch Republic and the Ottoman Empire for Ottoman Sultan Mehmed IV and his subjects to apply Dutch law to Dutch visitors to Ottoman territory.
- September 21 – Spanish troops make a counterattack on Santa Fe in the modern-day U.S. state of New Mexico, allowing the remaining Spanish troops in the besieged city to flee to El Paso (now in Texas).
- September 30 – Robert Boyle, having rediscovered the process of manufacturing phosphorus from bone ash, deposits his summary of the directions with The Royal Society of London for Improving Natural Knowledge. Boyle's assistant, Ambrose Godfrey, later develops Boyle's discovery to produce phosphorus commercially.

=== October–December ===
- October 9 – A massive 9.0 magnitude M_{w} earthquake destroys part of Málaga and other cities in the province of the same name.
- October 29 – At the request of King Charles XI of Sweden, the Riksdag in Sweden enacts the Great Reduction, returning fiefs which had been granted to the Swedish nobility to the Crown. The nation becomes an absolute monarchy under the rule of Charles.
- November 14 – The Great Comet of 1680 is first sighted by Gottfried Kirch, the first comet discovered by telescope.
- November 17 – The Green Ribbon Club, a predecessor of the British Whigs, organizes a procession to burn an effigy of the Pope in London for the second year running.
- December 17 (December 7 O.S.) – The trial for treason of William Howard, 1st Viscount Stafford before his fellow members of the House of Lords having concluded after seven days, the Lords vote on whether to convict him of the articles of impeachment. The Lords vote, 55 to 31 to convict him and to impose the death sentence and Lord Stafford is beheaded on 29 December (8 January 1681 N.S.)

=== Date unknown ===
- Chambers of Reunion (French courts under Louis XIV) decide on the complete annexation of Alsace.
- The first Portuguese governor is appointed to Macau.
- Johann Pachelbel writes his Canon in D Major

== Births ==
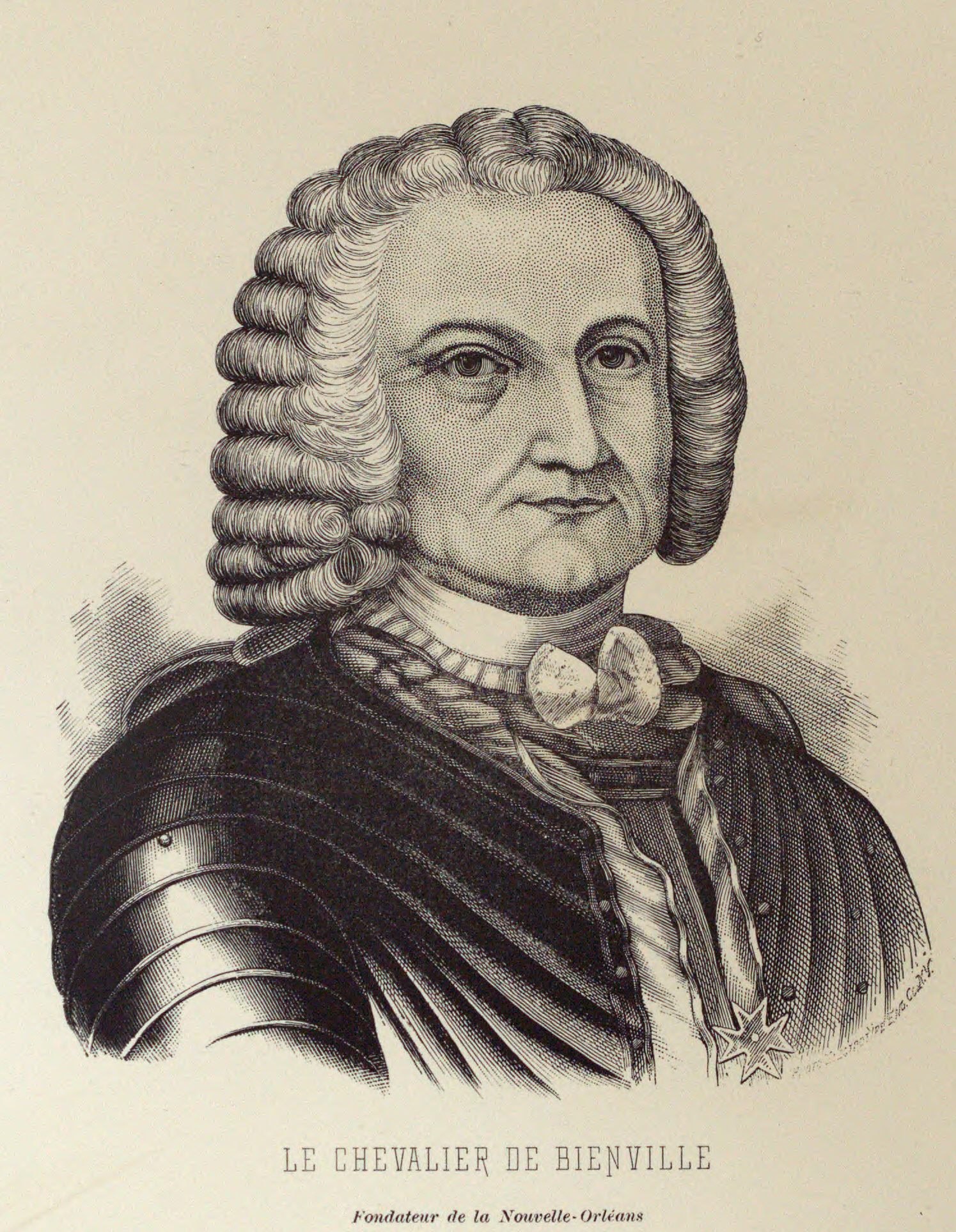
Jean-Baptiste Le Moyne

- January 23 – Joseph Ames, English author (d. 1759)
- February 14 – John Sidney, 6th Earl of Leicester, English privy councillor (d. 1737)
- February 23 – Jean-Baptiste Le Moyne de Bienville, French colonizer and Governor of Louisiana (d. 1767)
- April 9 – Philippe Néricault Destouches, French dramatist (d. 1754)
- April 23 – Anna Canalis di Cumiana, morganatic spouse of Victor Amadeus II of Savoy (d. 1769)
- June 22 – Ebenezer Erskine, Scottish religious dissenter (d. 1754)
- September 22 – Barthold Heinrich Brockes, German poet (d. 1747)
- October 19 – John Abernethy, Irish Protestant minister (d. 1740)
- date unknown – Bulleh Shah, Sufi poet (d. 1757)
- date unknown – Julianna Géczy, Hungarian heroine (d. 1714)
- approximate – Blackbeard (Edward Teach), English pirate (d. 1718)

== Deaths ==
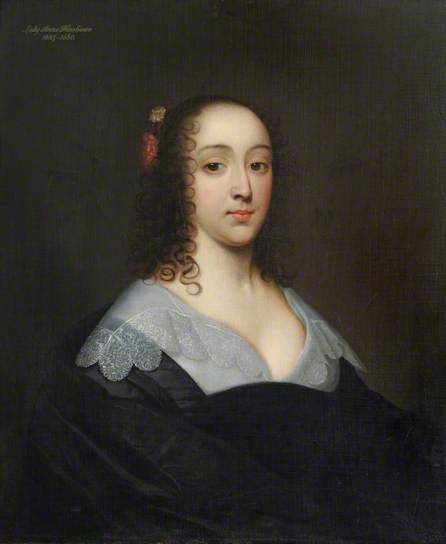
Ann, Lady Fanshawe

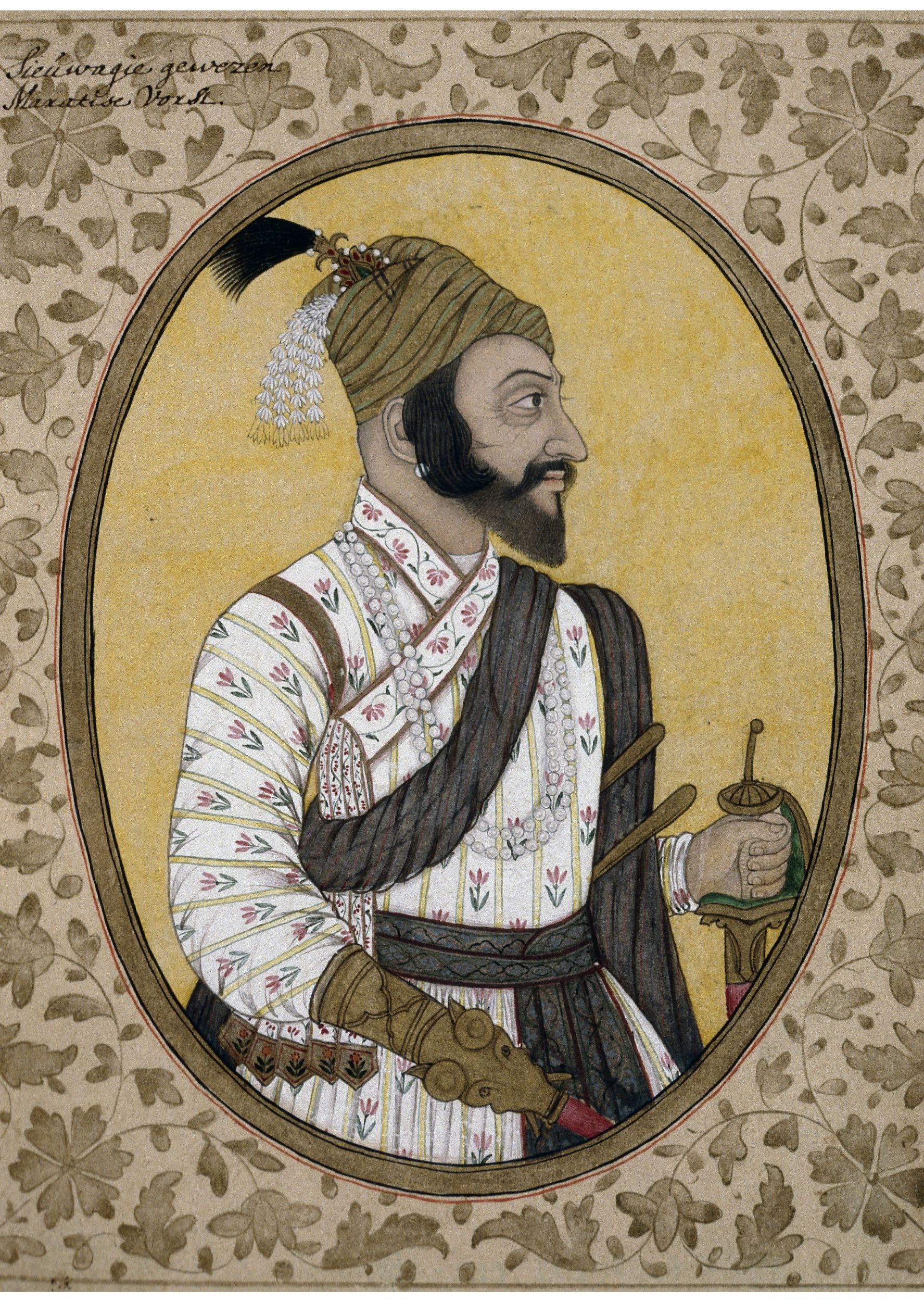
Shivaji

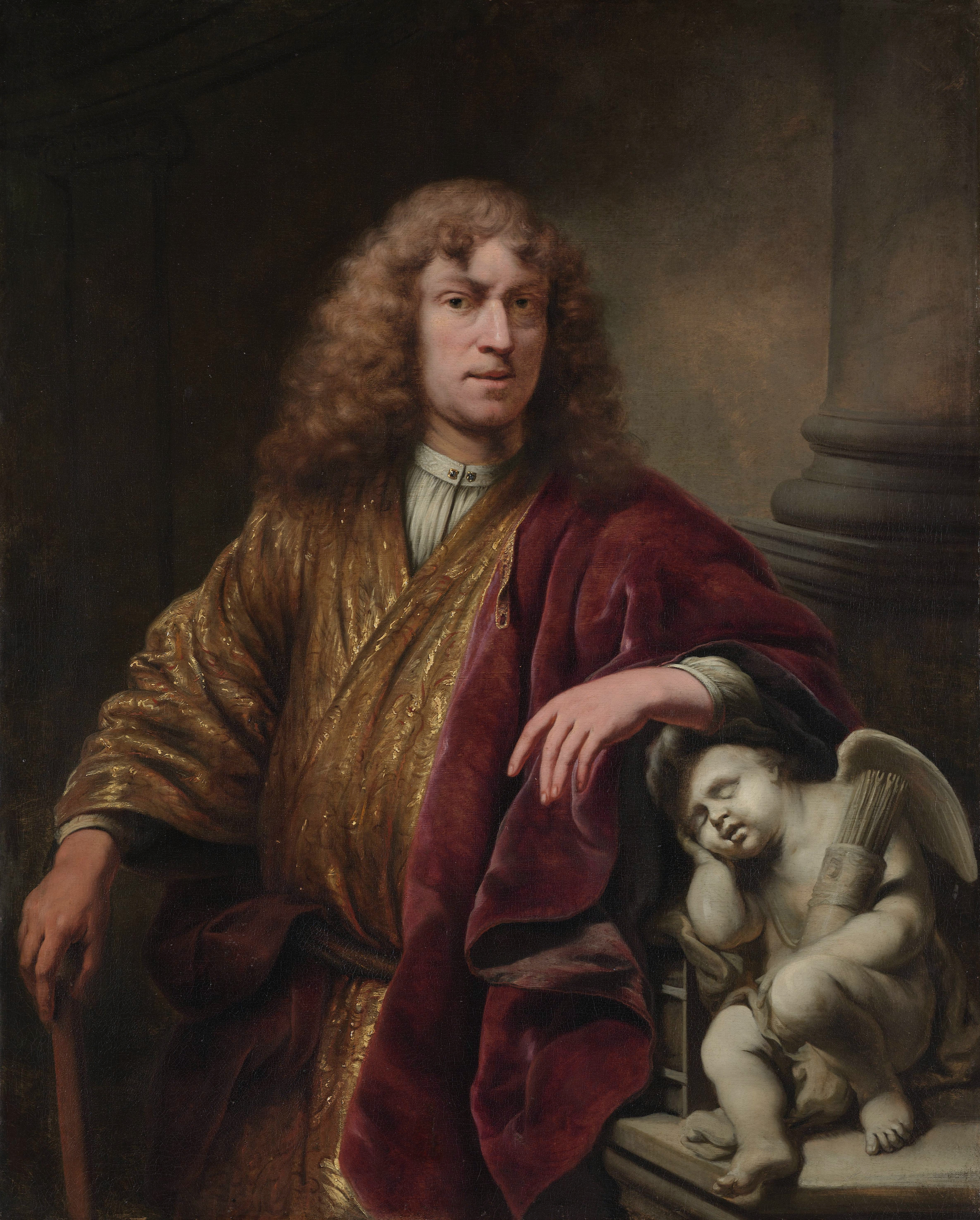
Ferdinand Bol

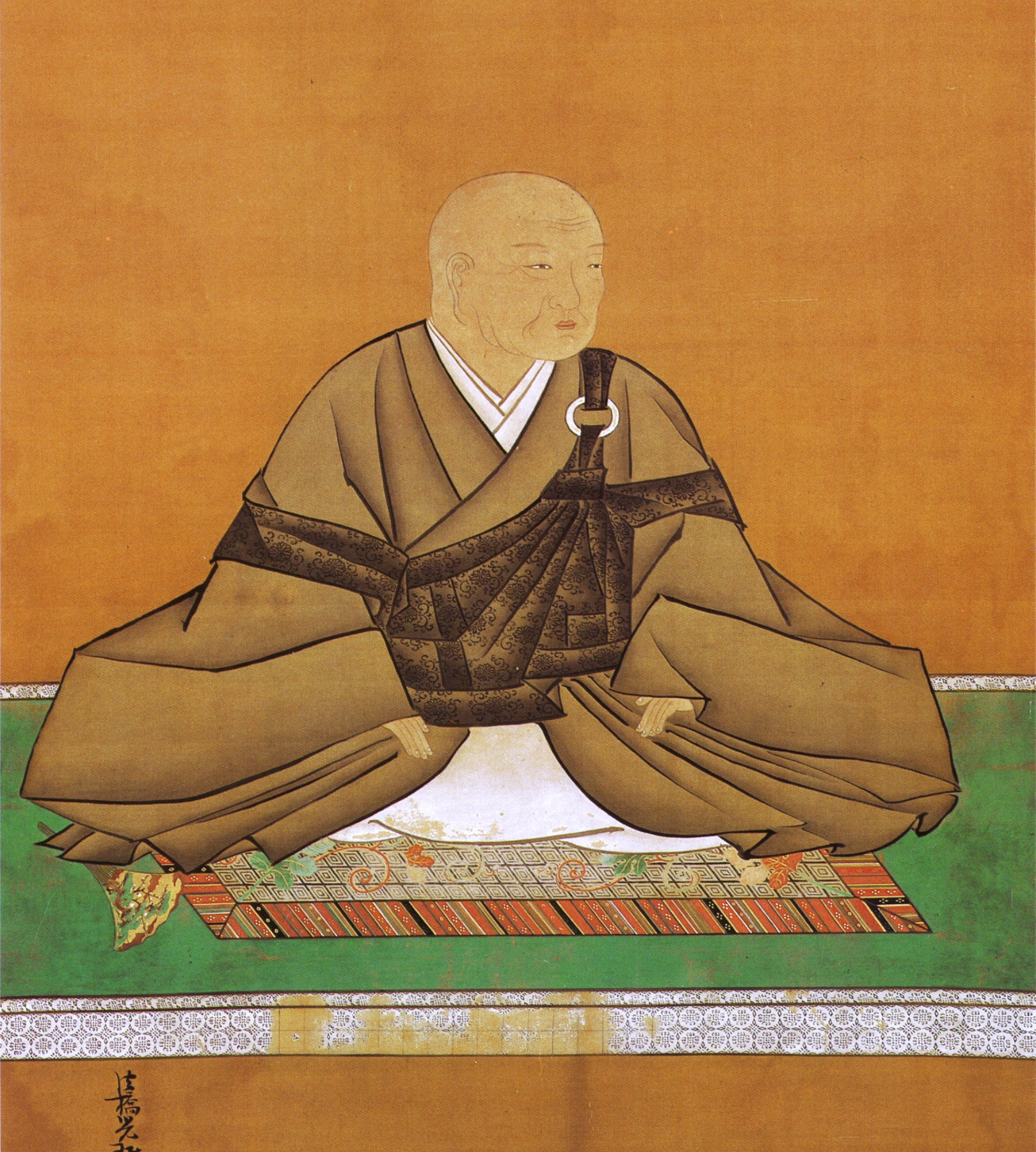
Emperor Go-Mizunoo

=== January–June ===
- January 2
  - John Jolliffe, English politician and businessman (b. 1613)
  - Trunajaya, Maduran prince and rebel leader, murdered (b. 1649)
- January 18 – John Hervey, English courtier and politician (b. 1616)
- January 20 – Ann, Lady Fanshawe, English memoirist (b. 1625)
- January 23 – Capel Luckyn, English Member of Parliament (b. 1622)
- February – Ralph Davenant, English rector and founder of Davenant Foundation School
- February 11 – Elisabeth of the Palatinate, German princess, philosopher and Calvinist (b. 1618)
- February 17
  - Denzil Holles, 1st Baron Holles, English statesman and writer (b. 1599)
  - Frans Post, Dutch painter (b. 1612)
  - Jan Swammerdam, Dutch scientist (b. 1637)
- February 22 – Catherine Monvoisin, French fortune teller and poisoner (b. c. 1640)
- February 27 – Philippe Balthazar de Gand, French noble (b. 1616)
- March 14 – René Le Bossu, French critic (b. 1631)
- March 17
  - William Brereton, 3rd Baron Brereton, English politician (b. 1631)
  - François de La Rochefoucauld, French writer (b. 1613)
- March 23 – Nicolas Fouquet, French statesman (b. 1615)
- April 1 – David Denicke, German jurist and hymnwriter (b. 1603)
- April 3 – Chhatrapati Shivaji Bhosale, founder of the Maratha Empire (b. 1630)
- April 19 – Marie Hedwig of Hesse-Darmstadt, Duchess consort of Saxe-Meiningen (1671–1680) (b. 1647)
- April 25
  - Louise of Anhalt-Dessau, Duchess suo jure of Oława and Wołów (1672–1680) (b. 1631)
  - Simon Paulli, Danish physician (b. 1603)
- April 29 – Nicolas Cotoner, Spanish 61st Grandmaster of the Knights Hospitaller (b. 1608)
- May 29 – Abraham Megerle, Austrian composer and organist (b. 1607)
- May 31 – Joachim Neander, German Calvinist clergyman (b. 1650)
- June 4
  - Augustus, Duke of Saxe-Weissenfels, administrator of the archbishopric of Magdeburg (b. 1614)
  - Tokugawa Ietsuna, Japanese Tokugawa shōgun (b. 1641)
- June 18 – Samuel Butler, English poet (b. 1612)
- June 10
  - Johan Göransson Gyllenstierna, Swedish statesman (b. 1635)
  - Louis Moréri, French encyclopedist (b. 1643)

=== July–December ===
- July 26
  - John Wilmot, 2nd Earl of Rochester, English poet (b. 1647)
  - Sir Hugh Smith, 1st Baronet, English Member of Parliament (b. 1632)
- July 30 – Thomas Butler, 6th Earl of Ossory (b. 1634)
- August 19 – John Eudes, French missionary (b. 1601)
- August 20 – William Bedloe, English informer (b. 1650)
- August 22 – John George II, Elector of Saxony (b. 1613)
- August 24
  - Ferdinand Bol, Dutch painter, etcher and draftsman (b. 1616)
  - Thomas Blood, thief of the English Crown Jewels (b. 1618)
- August 25 – Symeon of Polotsk, Belarusian churchman and poet (b. 1629)
- August 27 – Joan Cererols, Catalan musician and Benedictine monk (b. 1618)
- August 28 – Charles I Louis, Elector Palatine (b. 1617)
- September 1 – Anna Sophia I, Abbess of Quedlinburg, Dutch abbess (b. 1619)
- September 2 – Per Brahe the Younger, Swedish soldier and statesman (b. 1602)
- September 3
  - Anna Elisabeth of Anhalt-Bernburg, duchess consort of Württemberg-Bernstadt (b. 1647)
  - Paul Ragueneau, French Jesuit missionary (b. 1608)
- September 9 – Henry Marten, English regicide (b. 1602)
- September 10 – Baldassare Ferri, Italian castrato (b. 1610)
- September 11
  - Roger Crab, English Puritan political writer (b. 1621)
  - Emperor Go-Mizunoo of Japan (b. 1596)
- September 26 – John Dury, Scottish-born Calvinist minister (b. 1596)
- September 30 – Johann Grueber, Austrian Jesuit missionary and astronomer (b. 1623)
- October 4 – Pierre-Paul Riquet, French engineer and canal builder (b. 1609)
- October 13 – Lelio Colista, Italian composer and lutenist (b. 1629)
- October 16 – Raimondo Montecuccoli, Italian general (b. 1609)
- October 17 – Charles FitzCharles, 1st Earl of Plymouth, illegitimate son of King Charles II (b. 1657)
- October 30 – Antoinette Bourignon, Flemish mystic (b. 1616)
- November 9 – Hungerford Dunch, English politician (b. 1639)
- November 27 or November 28 – Athanasius Kircher, German Jesuit scholar (b. 1602)
- November 28
  - Gian Lorenzo Bernini, Italian sculptor (b. 1598)
  - Giovanni Francesco Grimaldi, Italian architect and painter (b. 1606)
- November 30 – Peter Lely, Dutch painter (b. 1618)
- December 4 – Thomas Bartholin, Danish physician, mathematician, and theologian (b. 1616)
- December 8 – Henry Pierrepont, 1st Marquess of Dorchester, English politician (b. 1606)
- December 10 – Marco Uccellini, Italian composer and violinist (b. 1603 or 1610)
- December 20 – Princess Elisabeth Sophie of Saxe-Altenburg, German princess (b. 1619)
- December 29
  - Arent Berntsen, Norwegian statistician (b. 1610)
  - William Howard, 1st Viscount Stafford of England (b. 1614)
- November 30 – Christopher Sandius, Dutch Arian writer (b. 1644)

=== Unknown date ===
- Zhou Youde, Chinese official
- Marie Meurdrac, French chemist and alchemist (b. 1610)
