= 1682 =

1682 in various calendars
- Gregorian calendar: 1682; MDCLXXXII
- Ab urbe condita: 2435
- Armenian calendar: 1131; ԹՎ ՌՃԼԱ
- Assyrian calendar: 6432
- Balinese saka calendar: 1603–1604
- Bengali calendar: 1088–1089
- Berber calendar: 2632
- English Regnal year: 33 Cha. 2 – 34 Cha. 2
- Buddhist calendar: 2226
- Burmese calendar: 1044
- Byzantine calendar: 7190–7191
- Chinese calendar: 辛酉年 (Metal Rooster); 4379 or 4172 — to — 壬戌年 (Water Dog); 4380 or 4173
- Coptic calendar: 1398–1399
- Discordian calendar: 2848
- Ethiopian calendar: 1674–1675
- Hebrew calendar: 5442–5443
- Hindu calendars
- Vikram Samvat: 1738–1739
- Shaka Samvat: 1603–1604
- Kali Yuga: 4782–4783
- Holocene calendar: 11682
- Igbo calendar: 682–683
- Iranian calendar: 1060–1061
- Islamic calendar: 1092–1094
- Japanese calendar: Tenna 2 (天和２年)
- Javanese calendar: 1604–1605
- Julian calendar: Gregorian minus 10 days
- Korean calendar: 4015
- Minguo calendar: 230 before ROC 民前230年
- Nanakshahi calendar: 214
- Thai solar calendar: 2224–2225
- Tibetan calendar: ལྕགས་མོ་བྱ་ལོ་ (female Iron-Bird); 1808 or 1427 or 655 — to — ཆུ་ཕོ་ཁྱི་ལོ་ (male Water-Dog); 1809 or 1428 or 656

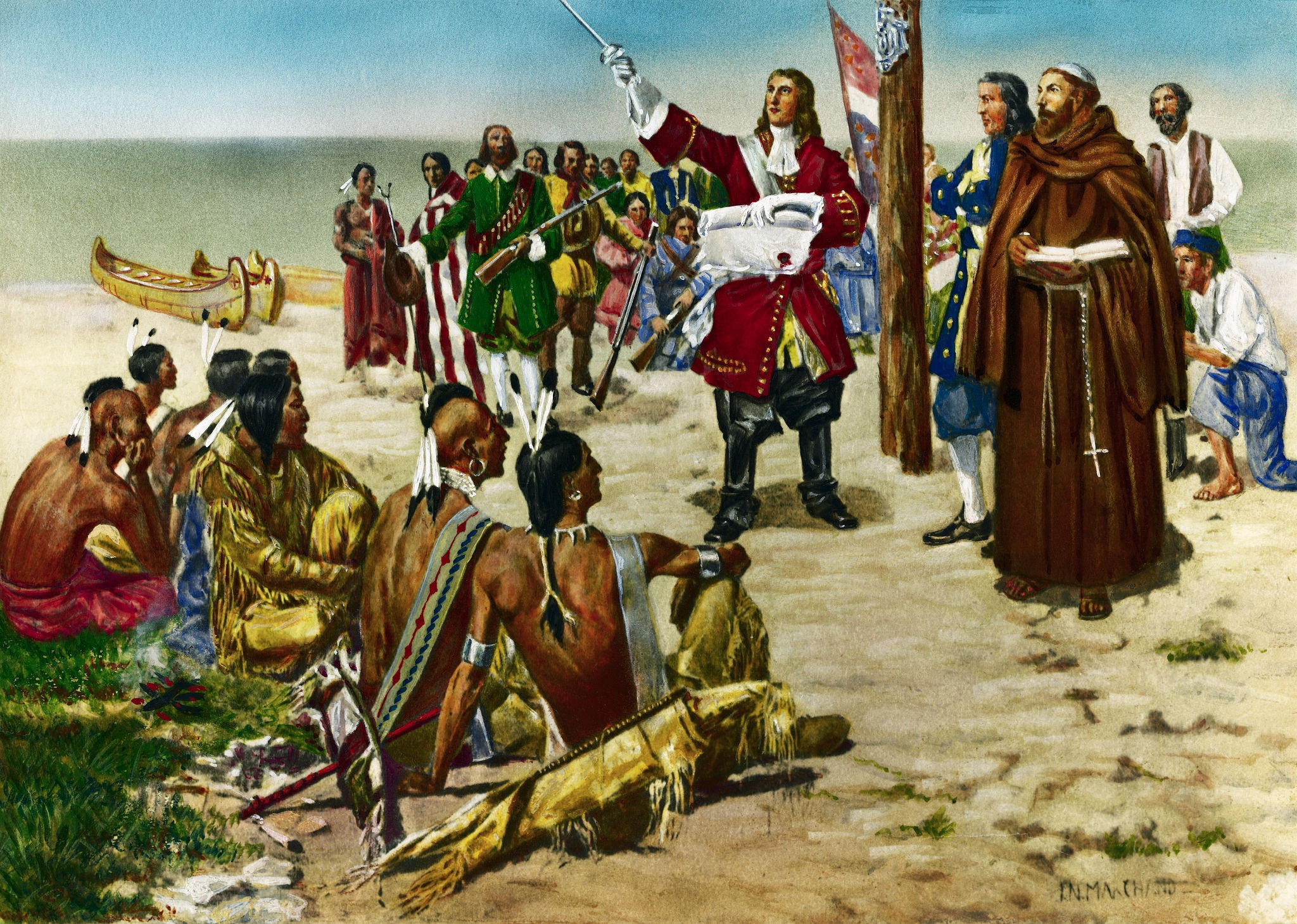
April 9: La Salle claims the Mississippi River and the surrounding Louisiana Territory for France.

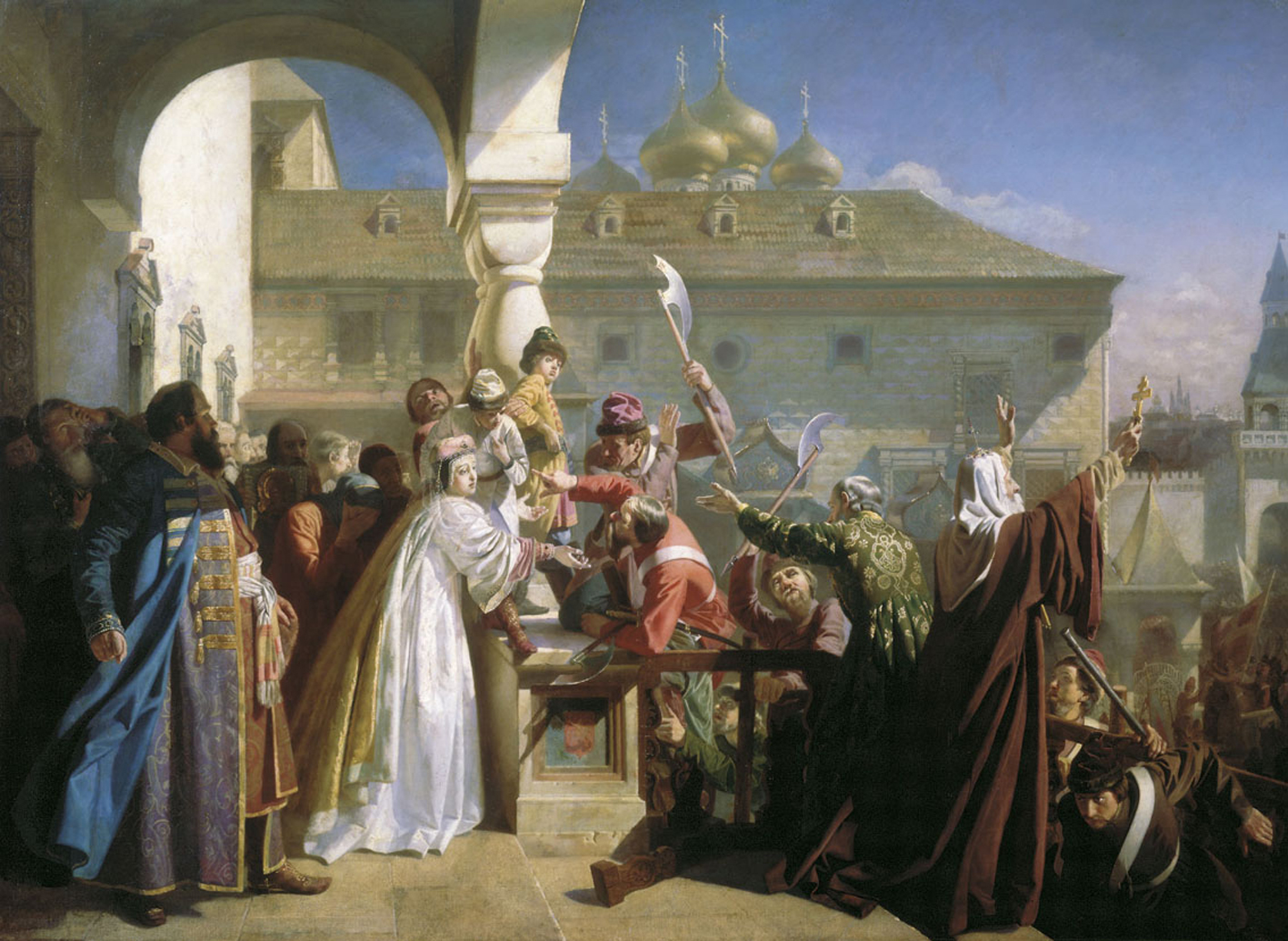
May 11: The Moscow Uprising of 1682 begins

1682 (MDCLXXXII) was a common year starting on Thursday of the Gregorian calendar and a common year starting on Sunday of the Julian calendar, the 1682nd year of the Common Era (CE) and Anno Domini (AD) designations, the 682nd year of the 2nd millennium, the 82nd year of the 17th century, and the 3rd year of the 1680s decade. As of the start of 1682, the Gregorian calendar was 10 days ahead of the Julian calendar, which remained in localized use until 1923.

== Events ==
=== January–March ===
- January 7 – The Republic of Genoa forbids the unauthorized printing of newspapers and all handwritten newssheets; the ban is lifted after three months.
- January 12 – Scottish minister James Renwick, one of the Covenanters resisting the Scottish government's suppression of alternate religious views, publishes the Declaration of Lanark.
- January 21 – The Ottoman Empire army is mobilized in preparation for a war against Austria that culminates with the 1683 Battle of Vienna.
- January 24 – The first public theater in Brussels, the Opéra du Quai au Foin, is opened.
- February 5 – In Japan, on the 28th day of the 12th month in the year Tenna 1, a major fire sweeps through Edo (now Tokyo).
- February 9 – Thomas Otway's classic play Venice Preserv'd or A Plot Discover'd is given its first performance, premiering at the Duke's Theatre.
- March 11 – Work begins on construction of the Royal Hospital Chelsea for old soldiers in London, England.

=== April–June ===
- April 7 – René-Robert Cavelier, Sieur de La Salle, exploring rivers in America, reaches the mouth of the Mississippi River.
- April 9 – At the mouth of the Mississippi River, near modern Venice, Louisiana, Robert de La Salle buries an engraved plate and a cross, claiming the territory as La Louisiane for France.
- May 6 – Louis XIV of France moves his court to Versailles.
- May 7 (April 27 O.S.) – Upon the death of the Tsar Feodor III of Russia, Feodor's younger brother, 15-year-old Ivan is passed over in favor of a half-brother, 10-year-old Peter.
- May 11 – The Moscow uprising of 1682 occurs when a mob, outraged by the rejection of Prince Ivan and upset over rumors that Ivan has been strangled, invades the Kremlin and lynches the leading boyars and military commanders. Ivan V and Peter I are named co-rulers of Russia as a result of a compromise between Peter's mother Natalya Naryshkina and Ivan's mother Maria Miloslavskaya and both are crowned a month later.
- June 8 – The English trading freighter Johanna is wrecked off of the coast of South Africa with the loss of 10 of her 114 crew, becoming the first of Britain's East India Company fleet to be lost.
- June 17 – The Indonesian city of Bandar Lampung is founded on the island of Sumatra.
- June 25 (June 15 O.S.) – Ivan V and Peter I are crowned as joint Tsars of Russia at the Cathedral of the Dormition in Moscow, with actual power exercised by their older sister, Sophia Alekseyevna for the next seven years.

=== July–September ===
- July 19 – Iyasus succeeds his father Yohannes I as Emperor of Ethiopia.
- August 6 – The Ottoman Empire declares war on the Holy Roman Empire and makes plans to attack Vienna.
- August 12 – Vesuvius begins a period of volcanic activity lasting for 10 days.
- August 23 – A comet that will later become known as Comet Halley, is observed from several locations on Earth after reaching magnitude 2 and becoming visible to the naked eye. Arthur Storer sees it from the North American colony of Maryland, while German astronomer Johannes Hevelius measures it from Danzig (now Gdansk in Poland). Edmond Halley successfully predicts that it will return in 1758.
- August 25 – Following the Bideford witch trial, three women (probably) become the penultimate known to be hanged for witchcraft in England, at Exeter.
- September 14 – Bishop Gore School is founded in Swansea, Wales.
- September 24 – Trịnh Căn becomes the new ruler of Tonkin (located in the northern part of Vietnam as far south as the Hà Tĩnh province upon the death of his father, Trịnh Tạc, and begins a program of reforms.

=== October–December ===
- October 12 – Sultan Mehmed IV departs Istanbul for Adrianople.
- October 19 – Kara Mustafa departs with the Ottoman army to Adrianople.
- October 27 – The city of Philadelphia, Pennsylvania is founded by William Penn.
- November 22 – Nearly 1,000 houses in Wapping, London are destroyed in a fire.
- December 11 – William Penn meets with Charles Calvert, 3rd Baron Baltimore for the first discussion of the boundary between the colonies of Pennsylvania and Maryland, fixed at 40 degrees north. Recognizing that 40° north would remove Pennsylvania's access to the sea, Penn proposes a purchase of some of Maryland's territory.
- December 27 – Colonists from the German electorate of Brandenburg arrive at Akwidaa on the Brandenburger Gold Coast at what is now Ghana and, five days later, begin building a fort at what is now Princes Town.

=== Date unknown ===
- Celia Fiennes, noblewoman and traveller, begins her journeys across Britain, in a venture that will prove to be her life's work. Her aim is to chronicle the towns, cities and great houses of the country. Her travels continue until at least 1712, and will take her to every county in England, though the main body of her journal is not written until the year 1702.
- The Richard Wall House, believed to be the longest continuously inhabited residence in the US, is built in Pennsylvania.

== Births ==
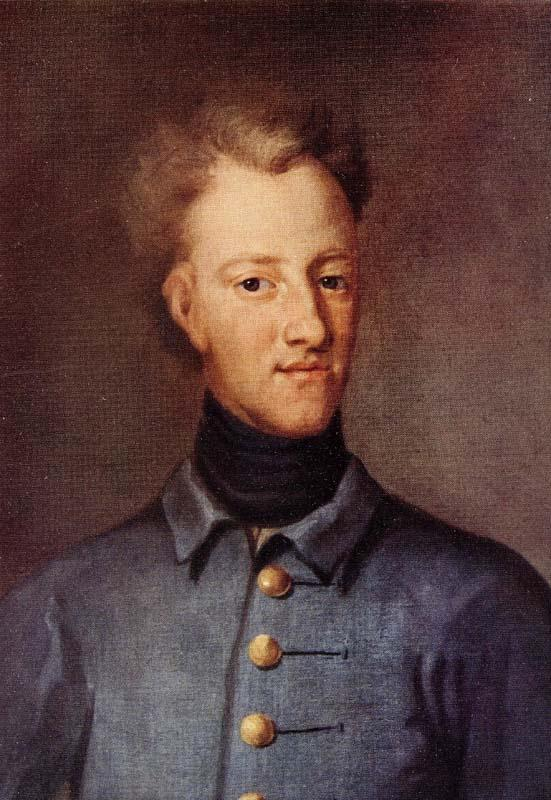
Charles XII of Sweden

- January 26 – Benjamin Lay, English vegetarian, abolitionist, and activist (d. 1759)
- February 25 – Giovanni Battista Morgagni, Italian anatomist (d. 1771)
- April 16 – John Hadley, English inventor (d. 1744)
- May 17 – Bartholomew Roberts, a.k.a. Black Bart, Welsh pirate (d. 1722)
- June 17 – King Charles XII of Sweden (d. 1718)
- July 10 – Roger Cotes, English mathematician (d. 1716)
- August 16 – Louis, duc de Bourgogne, heir to the throne of France (d. 1712)
- October 29 – Pierre François Xavier de Charlevoix, French historian (d. 1761)
- date unknown – Margareta Capsia, Finnish artist (d. 1759)

== Deaths ==
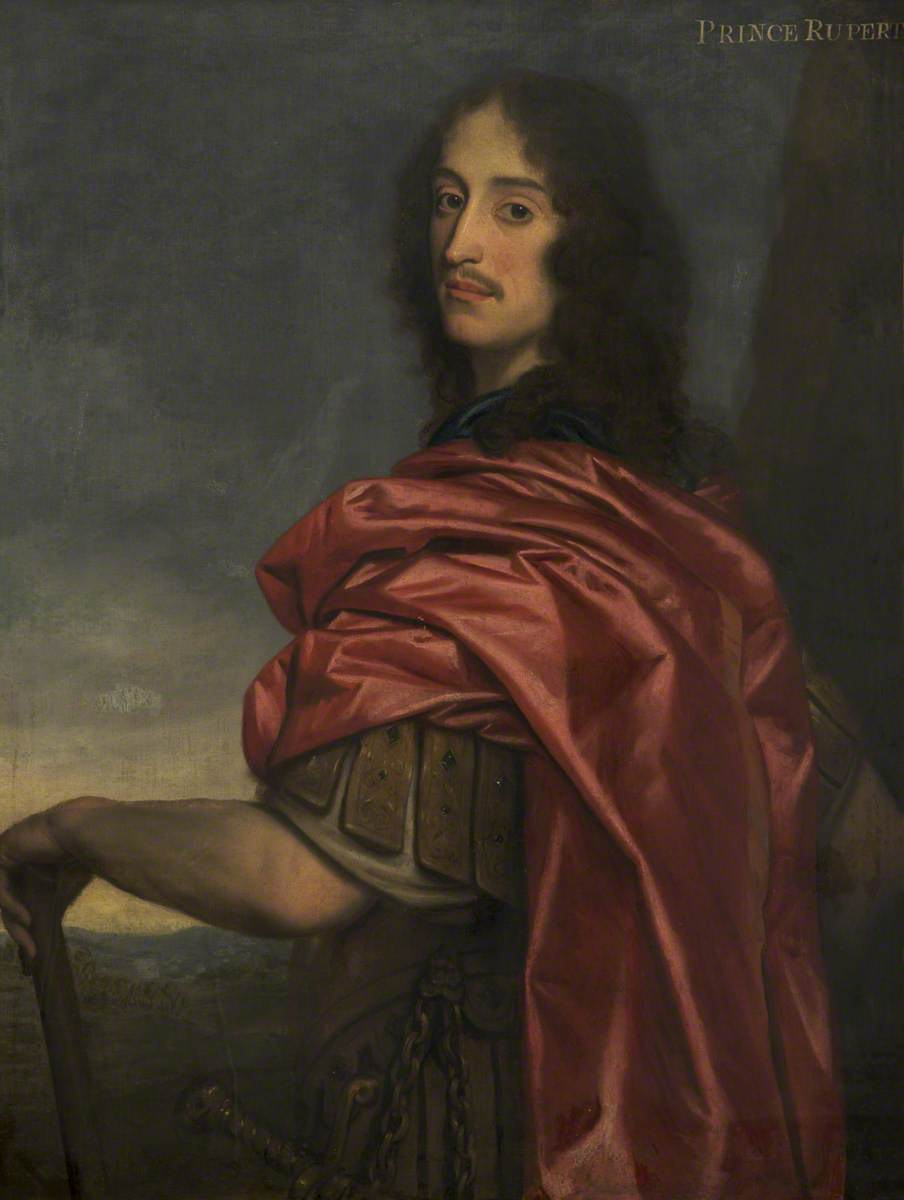
Prince Rupert of the Rhine

- January 1 – Jacob Kettler, German noble (b. 1610)
- January 3 – Olaus Verelius, scholar of Old Norse and Scandinavian studies (b. 1618)
- February 2 – Jean Le Pautre, French designer and engraver (b. 1618)
- February 10 – Sir William Hickman, 2nd Baronet, Member of the House of Commons of England (b. 1629)
- February 15
  - Claude de la Colombière, French Jesuit priest and saint (b. 1641)
  - Gu Yanwu, Chinese philologist and geographer (b. 1613)
- February 18 – Pierre Dupuis, French painter (b. 1610)
- February 19 – Frederick of Hesse-Darmstadt, German Catholic cardinal (b. 1616)
- February 25
  - Robert Packer, English politician (b. 1614)
  - Alessandro Stradella, Italian composer (b. 1639)
- March 13 – Dorothea Augusta of Schleswig-Holstein-Gottorp, German duchess (b. 1602)
- March 14 – Jacob Isaakszoon van Ruisdael, Dutch painter (b. c. 1628)
- March 24 – Frederick, Duke of Württemberg-Neuenstadt, German duke (b. 1615)
- March 31 – John Frescheville, 1st Baron Frescheville, English politician (b. 1607)
- April 1 – Franz Egon of Fürstenberg, German politician and Archbishop of Strasbourg (b. 1625)
- April 3 – Bartolomé Esteban Murillo, Spanish painter (b. 1618)
- April 6 – Johann von Hoverbeck, Prussian diplomat (b. 1606)
- April 8 – François Perrochel, French cleric (b. 1602)
- April 27 – Hŏ Mok, Korean politician, poet and scholar (b. 1595)
- May 7 – Tsar Feodor III of Russia (b. 1661)
- May 28 – Henri, Duke of Verneuil, French bishop (b. 1601)
- July 12 – Jean Picard, French astronomer (b. 1620)
- July 19 – Yohannes I, Emperor of Ethiopia (b. c. 1640)
- August 12 – Jean-Louis Raduit de Souches, German Imperial field marshal (b. 1608)
- August 24
  - John Maitland, 1st Duke of Lauderdale (b. 1616)
  - Marie Charlotte de la Trémoille, French noble (b. 1632)
- August 26 – William Wirich, Count of Daun-Falkenstein, German nobleman (b. 1613)
- September 8 – Juan Caramuel y Lobkowitz, Spanish writer (b. 1606)
- September 16 – Yamazaki Ansai, Japanese philosopher (b. 1619)
- October 19 – Sir Thomas Browne, English author, physician and philosopher (b. 1605)
- October 20 – António das Chagas, Portuguese Franciscan friar and ascetical writer (b. 1631)
- November 2 – Francis Browne, 3rd Viscount Montagu in the Peerage of England (b. 1610)
- November 4 – Dirck Rembrantsz van Nierop, Dutch astronomer and cartographer (b. 1610)
- November 14 – Rijcklof van Goens, Dutch colonial governor (b. 1619)
- November 23 – Claude Lorrain, Lorraine-born landscape painter (b. c. 1600)
- November 28 – Valentine Greatrakes, Irish faith healer (b. 1628)
- November 29 – Prince Rupert of the Rhine, German soldier, Royalist commander in the English Civil War (b. 1619)
- December 18
  - Heneage Finch, 1st Earl of Nottingham, English politician (b. 1621)
  - Guðríður Símonardóttir, Icelandic woman victim of the Turkish Abductions (b. 1598)

date unknown

- Phillip Calvert, Colonial governor of Maryland (b. c. 1626)
- Mariam Dadiani, Queen Dowager of Kartli (b. 1599/1609)
- The Great 5th Dalai Lama of Tibet (b. 1617)
