= Gabrielle Suchon =

French moral philosopher (1632-1703)

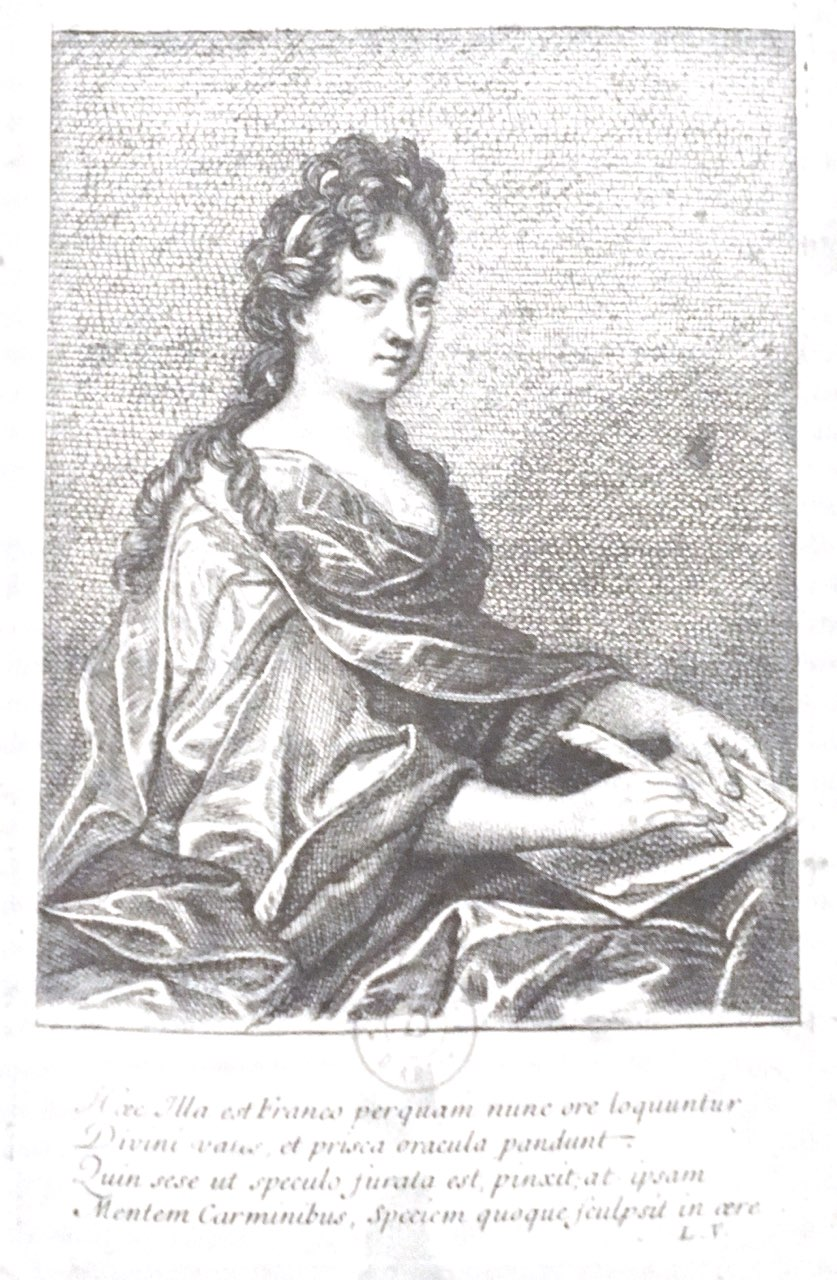
- Born: December 24, 1632; Semur-en-Auxois, France
- Died: March 5, 1703 (aged 70); Dijon, France
- Known for: Proto-feminist philosophy
- Notable work: Traité de la morale et de la politique (Treatise on Morality and Politics); Du célibat volontaire (On the Celibate Life Freely Chosen)

Gabrielle Suchon (December 24, 1632 – March 5, 1703) was a French moral philosopher who participated in debates about the social, political and religious condition of women in the early modern era. Her most prominent works are the Traité de la morale et de la politique (Treatise on Morality and Politics) and Du célibat volontaire (On the Celibate Life Freely Chosen).

Suchon is considered the first philosopher to produce a significant body of work dedicated solely to the topic of women. Suchon's writing is unique because she specifically addresses women, as opposed to most moral philosophy of the time, whose primary audience was men. She is considered the only female philosopher of her time without a male intellectual advisor or husband.

In her works, Suchon argues that women are deserving of the natural rights of liberty, learning and authority. She asserts that a woman can live a fulfilling life while unmarried and promotes the power of voluntary celibacy on secular terms.

== Early life ==
Gabrielle Suchon was born in Semur-en-Auxios (Burgundy), France, on December 24, 1632, to Claude Mongin and Claude Suchon. Gabrielle's mother, Claude Mongin, came from a relatively well-off land-owning family. Many of the men in the Mongin family had served as jurists in France. Gabrielle's father came from a line of minor nobles who had historically served as public officials. Claude Suchon served as the King's prosecutor until his death in 1645.

Gabrielle Suchon may have had a younger brother, also named Claude Suchon.

== Education ==
Suchon was self-educated because women were barred from studying at public institutions during her lifetime. Her writings make clear that she was well versed in the holy scriptures and the works of both classic and contemporary philosophers and writers.

Suchon studied the works of Socrates, Plato, Aristotle, Cicero, Seneca, Plutarch and other ancient philosophers. She utilized their praise of female qualities figures and characteristics to craft her arguments for women's equality.

Suchon refers to the work of Scholastics such as St. Thomas and St. John of the Cross. She also responds to the notable feminist treatise Of the Equality of the Two Sexes (1673) by François Poulain de la Barre.

Suchon cites evidence from various chapters of the Bible in her Traité de la morale et de la politique. She spent her early years in a convent, where she most likely received the religious education of a nun. Since nuns were forbidden to read directly from the scripture without the interpretation of a male bishop, it is likely that Suchon continued her biblical education, as well as her studies of the classics and contemporary philosophy after leaving the convent.

== Adult life ==
=== Convent in Semur ===
Suchon's adult life is primarily pieced together through official church documents. Her whereabouts during many of her adult years remain a mystery. Most sources say that Suchon was sent to a Dominican convent in Semur after her father's death in 1645 and resided there until 1666.

Recent historical research has disputed when and why Suchon was sent to the convent in Semur. Some researchers speculate that Suchon was sent to the convent shortly after her father's death to alleviate her family's financial burdens. Others suggest that she may have been sent to the convent some years later after failing to secure a desirable marriage.

=== Contestation of vows ===
Church documents have revealed that on October 15, 1666, Suchon was legally transferred from the convent in Semur to the Jacobin monastery at Langres. It is unclear whether Suchon ever took residence at the Langres convent and there is speculation that Suchon may have used the guise of this transfer to escape entirely and travel to Rome. Suchon did file a petition to the pope to contest her vows and restore herself to lay person. Suchon's petition was read by the Congregation of the Council in Rome on September 10, 1672. Documents show that in 1673 Suchon was no longer on the roster of nuns at Langres. Suchon's desire to denounce her vows was the cause of the strained relationship with her family for most of her life.

=== Life as a lay woman ===
Very little is known about Suchon's life outside of the convent. Suchon most likely began her life as a lay woman in 1673. Evidence suggests that Suchon spent around twenty years in Dijon teaching and writing before she released her Traité de la morale et de la politique in 1693.

Suchon remained unmarried her whole life. She died on March 5, 1703, in Dijon, France, after spending her last years teaching children and writing.

== Works ==
=== Background ===
Suchon wrote while an intellectual debate called the querelle des femmes or 'the woman question' was taking place in Europe (14th-17th century). Writers in the movement responded to attacks upon women by debating the moral and social nature of womanhood. Participants in the querelle des femmes were an unequal mix of male and female intellectuals. Men dominated the movement, even in a genre that centered around the condition of women. Due to the content of her work and the time in which she wrote, most historians consider Suchon to have contributed to this intellectual movement.

The established structure of arguments belonging to the querelle des femmes movement consisted of two approaches: identifying women throughout history whose actions exemplified their worthiness and analyzing the social and economic reasons for women being seen as unequal. Suchon's Traité de la morale et de la politique differs and expands upon the model put forth by prominent writers in the querelle des femmes. Suchon is the only female participant in the querelle des femmes to write a treatise, considered to be a comprehensive and authoritative form of writing. In her treatise, she establishes that her style and approach is original and emphasizes her individuality as a writer. Her writing suggests that she believed her methods to be superior to the standard argumentative styles of the querelle des femmes.

Suchon is the first philosopher to condemn marriage and to discuss female celibacy in a secular sense. Furthermore, she is one of the first philosophers to state that her audience is women, not men. This is significant because women were restricted from reading and partaking in intellectual work and essentially all established academics were men during her lifetime. Her perspective would have been considered radical by both intellectuals and the common person, male or female.

=== Traité de la morale et de la politique (Treatise on Morality and Politics) ===
Suchon originally published Traité de la morale et de la politique under the pseudonym 'G. S. Aristophile' in 1693. The pseudonym 'Aristophile' consists of the Greek roots aristo- meaning "excellence", and -phile, meaning "lover". Suchon's pseudonym is a play on words meaning 'lover of excellence'. Although Suchon uses a pseudonym, she is unafraid to reveal that she is a woman in the Preface of Traité de la morale et de la politique .

The Traité de la morale et de la politique contains an analysis of female oppression and suggests a solution to this ancient, pervasive affliction. Suchon aims to motivate women to cast off the shackles of dependence and ignorance. Suchon's treatise is broken up into three sections: liberty, learning and authority. Suchon begins her treatise by stating that many women believe their inferior condition to be natural to their sex. Suchon condemns this idea and states that women have a capacity for learning and self-governance equal to that of men. She argues that the confinement of women to the private sphere is a mechanism of oppression. She urges women to resist societal expectations and to acquire education as a way to reverse their unjust subjugation to men.

Suchon asserts that religion and scripture is being used as a tool to reinforce the subjugation of women and male supremacy. Her idea of female autonomy directly challenges the authority of husbands and church fathers.

Suchon utilizes classical and religious texts to craft her argument for female empowerment. Her use of religious texts is a point of debate for modern historians. Post-enlightenment thinkers would classify Suchon's work as lacking in philosophical merit because it fails to exclude religious texts.

==== Liberty ====
In her section on liberty, Suchon depicts the complicated and extensive nature of women's deprivation of freedom throughout history.

Suchon gives examples of admirable women in literature and throughout history in order to prove that women have the capacity to be independent of and equal to men. She asserts that both physical freedom and freedom to discover knowledge are natural rights.

Suchon states that men oppress and degrade women, and women are forced to respect their oppressors. She argues that God created rational beings to be free and asserts that when women are given the right to true freedom, they can negate the age-old idea that women are inherently inferior to men.

==== Learning ====
Suchon describes women as essentially equal to men in intellect. She argues that "women's deprivation of knowledge originates not in divine or natural law" and attributes female oppression to man-made social constructions. She argues that "ignorance is a form of slavery", and advocates for education as the tool with which women can combat their subjugation to men.

From a religious standpoint, Suchon argues that a good Christian strives to better themselves. Women are deprived of the tools needed to better themselves spiritually and socially, specifically through education. Suchon asserts that by denying women the right to knowledge they are denied agency in the public sphere.

==== Authority ====
In the third section, Suchon discusses power relationships between men and women. She asserts that when women are denied authority, they are prevented from acting upon the innate tendency to do what is right. Suchon argues that God gave power over nature to both men and women and therefore, men's supposed superiority to women is a distortion of God's will.

Suchon emphasizes the negative effect on society and the world at large by female oppression. Suchon argues that by barring women from intellectual debate, society as a whole is being deprived of great thinkers.

Suchon's treatise ends by raising the question of whether women can truly exercise their rights within a society that is created by and for men.

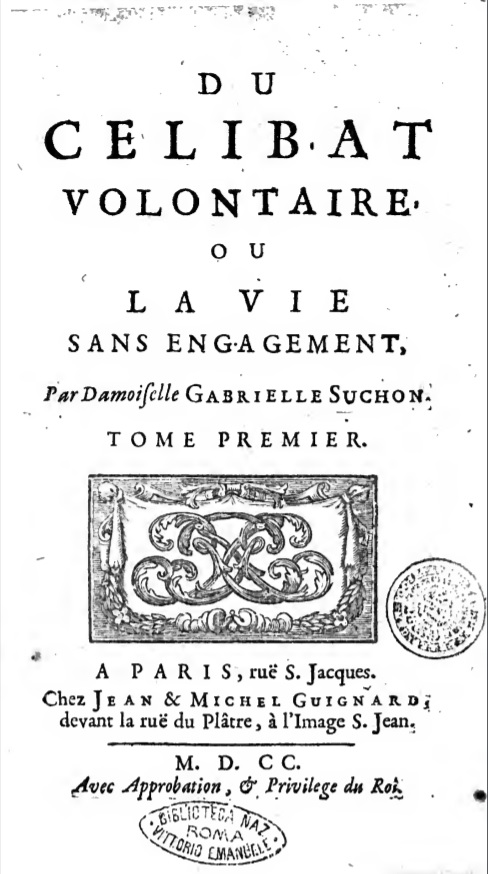
Du Celibat Volontaire, Gabrielle Suchon (1700)

=== Du célibat volontaire (On the Celibate Life Freely Chosen) ===
In Du célibat volontaire, Suchon presents another possible solution for women to escape subjugation. Suchon envisions female freedom as autonomy to exist actively, or to live an educated and informed life. She asserts that a life unfettered by societal constraints in which one is free to pursue intellectualism, is preferable to both marriage and religious vows.

Suchon discusses celibacy through the lens of Neutrality. Suchon coins the term "Neutralist" and describes women who live the celibate life as such. The "Neutralist" is devoted to God, helping others and cultivation of the self.

Suchon details the twelve benefits of female celibacy. A notable benefit of forgoing marriage is the ability to care for the poor instead of producing children. She points out that a celibate life is accessible to wealthier women, widows and poor women who work to sustain themselves. Suchon suggests friendship as a remedy to the melancholy that comes with having no familial attachments and commitments.

Suchon views celibacy not as a religious virtue, but as a practical path to gaining individual autonomy and freedom for women. Suchon does not dismiss the fact that some women may have the desire and inclination to take religious vows and encourages those that do to follow the religious path. However, Suchon strongly condemns parents that force the religious life upon their young, naive daughters for self-serving reasons.

Suchon rejects the widely accepted idea that women needed to be cloistered (segregated from men) to draw away the temptations of the flesh. In fact, she attests that nuns are equally as susceptible to sins of the flesh as secular women. She argues that while it was widely accepted that nuns held religious authority, Catholic clergymen reserved true divine knowledge for members of their own sex.

=== Reception ===
Suchon's work did receive some attention in France when she first released her writings. Both Suchon's Traité de la morale et de la politique (1693) and Du Célibat volontaire (1700) were reviewed in Le Journal des Savants, one of the premier intellectual journals in France, the year they were published. Du Célibat volontaire was also featured in another notable French journal, Nouvelles de la république des lettres after its release. Recognition by these premier French journals shows that some intellectuals saw the quality of Suchon's work and took her perspective seriously.

== Legacy ==
Suchon remained relatively undiscovered until the second revival of the Feminist Movement in the 1980s. Historians argue that Suchon's work did not gain significant popularity because male intellectuals discredited 'feminized' writing throughout the early modern era. In the 1980s, Suchon's life and work was studied by feminist historians and moral philosophers for the first time. It was not until the late 20th century that Suchon was established as an influential moral philosopher and feminist writer in the academic community.

Suchon's work serves as a valuable historical document. Up until the 17th century, European women were offered two life paths: find a husband or become a nun. Marriage was greatly stifling to a woman's freedom and sometimes the nunnery was the only venue that women could gain independence from the confines of gender discrimination. Suchon's writing sheds light upon the difficulty women faced in getting an education, the realities of marriage and life in convents in the early modern era. The significance of Suchon's perspective is only properly illustrated when against the backdrop of cultural norms of the early modern era.

Suchon is considered to be the most prominent pro-woman writer during the reign of Louis XIV, a time where both intellectual endeavors and economic freedom for women were greatly stifled in France. Marie de Gournay, a prominent pro-woman writer, is Suchon's most similar contemporary.

On the occasion of the 300th anniversary of her death in 2003, a road was named after Gabrielle Suchon in her hometown of Semur-en-Auxois.

=== Distribution of works ===
A copy of Du célibat volontaire was found at the cloister of Billettes until the French Revolution, suggesting that Suchon's work was read in at least one convent. Historians have found physical copies of Suchon's Traité de la morale et de la politique in Paris, Grenoble, Dijon, Besançon and Aix-en-Provence. Du Célibat volontaire has been discovered in Besançon, Paris, as well as in the Bayerische Staatsbibliothek (Bavarian State Library), Göttingen, Florence and Rome. The wider dispersal of Suchon's second work could be a result of French readers travelling abroad or printers bringing the text to trade shows.

=== Position in Feminist history ===
Suchon wrote in a time in which 'feminist' was neither term nor a genre of writing and study. Suchon is best described as a proto-feminist because her writings largely reflect the direction of the future feminist movement. In recent years, scholars have called Suchon a precursor to one of the most notable feminists, Simone de Beauvoir.

Suchon essentially proposes a new social and legal status for women. Her works serve as a call for women to break from gender expectations and to embrace a new freedom. In modern terms, Suchon could be considered one of the first female activists. Suchon is one of the first philosophers to specifically discuss the topic of human rights.

== Quotes ==
- "To uncover the source, origin, and causes of ignorance, constraint and dependence in which the person's of the sex spend their lives, I prove through pertinent and forceful arguments that the conduct imposed on them is based on custom rather than on a natural inability to study, govern, or act freely; and thus that their capacity to accomplish great and beautiful deeds cannot be contested." (Gabrielle Suchon, Traité de la morale et de la politique, Preface to the Treatise)
- "Privation is a field so fertile and abundant in miseries that its products are infinite. To speak of all the bitter fruit it forces persons of the sex to taste would be a never-ending task." (Gabrielle Suchon, Traité de la morale et de la politique, Preface to the Treatise)
- "Since freedom is an extremely delicate matter, knowledge is elevated and sublime, and authority is illustrious and striking, and since persons of the sex are denied these three prerogatives to the greatest extent possible, I must defend my case with powerful supports." (Gabrielle Suchon, Traité de la morale et de la politique, Preface to the Treatise)
- "The worth or beauty of language seems to resemble the value of clothing and fashion, which change continuously." (Gabrielle Suchon, Traité de la morale et de la politique, Preface to the Treatise)
- "But since this book is new by its title and unprecedented by its content and subject matter, I sought to make the work incontestable by powerful reasoning rather than by polished discourse, which captivates the mind immediately but does not nourish it fully, which dazzles it momentarily before leaving it forever empty." (Gabrielle Suchon, Traité de la morale et de la politique, Preface to the Treatise)
- "My sole intention in this entire treatise has been to inspire generosity and magnanimity in persons of the sex so that they can protect themselves against servile constraint, stupid ignorance, and base and degrading dependence." (Gabrielle Suchon, Traité de la morale et de la politique, Preface to the Treatise)
- "The inequality among people is very great: some are not destined to repair the ruins of the human race, while others are not strong enough to lead a life of pentinece and prayer." (Gabrielle Suchon, Du célibat volontaire, Foreword)
- "If cloistered persons cherish books that speak of religious life, it is likewise fitting that this treatise on voluntary celibacy belongs specifically to Neutralists. It is to those generous souls-who devote themselves wholly to serving God, helping their neighbor, and improving themselves ever more- that I present this work." (Gabrielle Suchon, Du célibat volontaire, Foreword)
- "[Those who embrace celibacy] are content with the power of choice they have without ever exercising it; they esteem all other conditions but nonetheless prefer their own, which they know is uniquely suited and altogether necessary to them." (Gabrielle Suchon, Du célibat volontaire, Foreword)
- "And since women, through the bonds of marriage, are subject to their husbands, attached to their children, and preoccupied by their servants and the pursuit of temporal possessions -prickly thorns indeed that cause inconceivable toil and difficulties- I will describe the happiness of free persons, exempt from such troubles." (Gabrielle Suchon, Du célibat volontaire, Foreword)
