= Louis André (Jesuit) =

French Jesuit priest and missionary

Louis André, S.J., (28 May 1631 – 19 September 1715) was a French Jesuit priest and missionary who went to the French colony of Canada in 1669. He assisted with the evangelization of the American Indians in Quebec.

== Life ==
André was born in Saint-Rémy-de-Provence. He was ordained a priest of the Jesuit order and was sent to serve in the Jesuit mission in Canada in 1669. He assisted in the formal ceremony declaring the North West Territory was the territory of the King of France. His first missionary duty was served among the Indians around Lake Huron.

With Claude-Jean Allouez, S.J., André built the Mission of St. Francis Xavier in what is now De Pere, Wisconsin. He continued to serve as a missionary, evangelizing the Menominee, Potawatomi, and Winnebago tribes in the Green Bay, Wisconsin, area. He relocated to Mackinac in 1682 and 1683, going on to teach at the Jesuit College in Quebec for several years. He returned to missionary work on the lower St. Lawrence River from 1691 to 1692. He died in Quebec some years later.

André's ministry in the New World combined a great deal of missionary work as well as a number of years teaching philosophy and Latin. At some time in Canada he compiled an important Algonkin and Ottawa dictionary and a small conversational manual which still exists.
