= Vincent Houdry =

French Jesuit preacher and writer

Vincent Houdry (23 January 1631 in Tours – 21 March 1729 in Paris) was a French Jesuit and writer on ascetics.

== Biography ==
According to the catalogues of the Society of Jesus, Houdry entered the Society of Jesus at Paris on 10 October 1647, and after the novitiate followed the regular course of studies (three years philosophy and four years theology). For a considerable while he was engaged in teaching: classics, six years; rhetoric, one year; philosophy, four years. After this he became a celebrated pulpit orator, preaching for the next twenty-five years in the more important cities of France. During the remainder of his life he was principally occupied in writing sermons.

He died on 21 March 1729 in Paris at the age of 98. His obituary in the archives of the Society praises his talent as an orator and his never-tiring industry as a speaker and a writer. Among his virtues, his faithful observance of the rules, even to the ninety-ninth year of his life, is especially mentioned.

== Writings ==
Houdry left two important homiletic works.

His collected sermons, under the title Sermons sour tous les sujets de la morale chrétienne, appeared in Paris, 1696-1702. It comprises five parts in twenty-two volumes, and has run through several editions; it was also printed in part in a German translation at Augsburg in 1739. With his wonted scrupulous care, he supplemented it by an index volume, together with a treatise on the imitation of famous preachers. (A collection from the large work can be found in Migne, "Collection des orateurs sacrés", XXXVI, XXXVII.)

Houdry's second great literary work was La bibliothèque des predicateurs 'library of preachers' 1865). This consists of an ambitiously planned collection of materials for preachers, which he called a "library", and which was fully published, 1712-1725, in twenty-three volumes at Lyons. Two translations of this work in Latin and one in Italian have been completed; and as recently as 1862 a "Biblical Patristic Concordance for Preachers and Catechists" was compiled from it.

In the introductions to both works, Houdry sets forth his views on the functions of a preacher and criticizes the style of preaching in vogue in his time. In 1702, the famous preacher published a small ascetic treatise in two volumes, on the exercises of St. Ignatius, the founder of the Jesuits, addressed to priests and accordingly written in Latin.
