= Davenant Centre =

Building in Tower Hamlets, London, England

Coordinates: 51.5185°N 0.0640°W

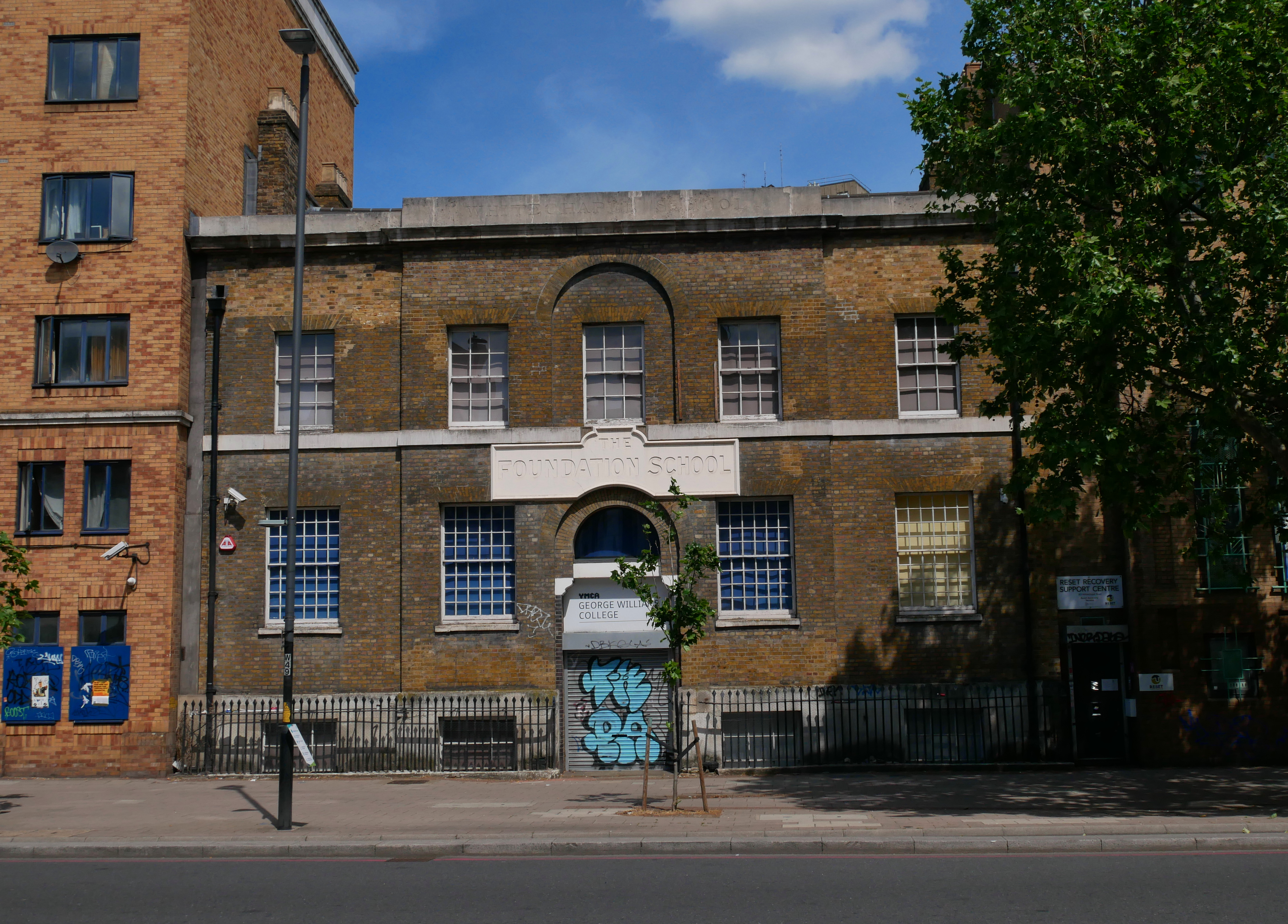
The Davenant Centre in 2017

The Davenant Centre, situated in Whitechapel in the East End of London, England, was a centre of excellence for youth services in the London Borough of Tower Hamlets.

The Davenant Centre was built to remember the community work of the Reverend Ralph Davenant, Rector of Whitechapel, who left a legacy to educate forty boys and thirty girls. A building was first erected on the Whitechapel site of the present Davenant Centre in 1660. A school was built following the death of Reverend Ralph Davenant in 1680 and re-built and expanded in 1818 and 1896. The rear building of the present Davenant Centre has a Grade II Renaissance Style Listing.

The Davenant Centre is part of the East End community and was in regular use by voluntary groups in Tower Hamlets.

== See also ==
- Reverend Ralph Davenant
- Davenant Foundation School
- Christopher Seward
- Davenant International
- Loughton
- Whitechapel
