= Ralph Davenant =

Rector and school founder (died 1680)

Reverend Ralph Davenant (died 16 February 1680) was rector of St Mary's in Whitechapel, east London, and left £100 in his will to start a school for 40 poor boys of the parish, Davenant Foundation School.

== See also ==
- Davenant Foundation School
- Davenant International
- Davenant Centre
