= António das Chagas =

Portuguese Franciscan friar and ascetical writer

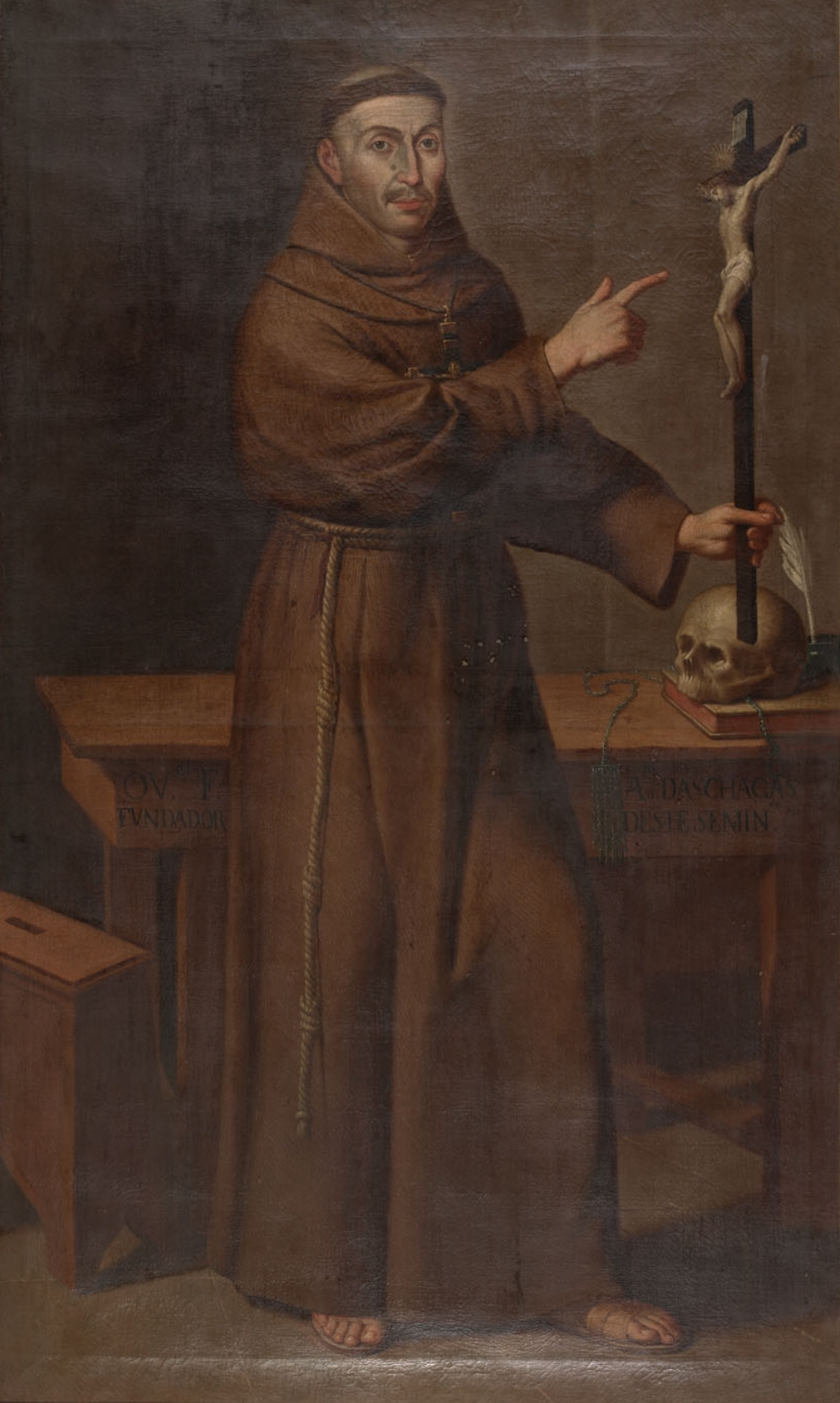
Friar António das Chagas, O.F.M.

António das Chagas (Anthony of the Holy Wounds), (25 June 1631 – 20 October 1682) was a Portuguese Franciscan friar and ascetical writer.

== Life ==
=== Early life ===
He was born António da Fonseca Soares on 25 June 1631 at Vidigueira, then in the ancient Estremadura Province of the Kingdom of Portugal. He was the son of a Portuguese minor nobleman and judge and an Irish mother. He was enrolled at the Jesuit college in Évora for his primary studies. Later he was forced to leave his studies at the age of 18, due to the death of his father.

Upon the outbreak of the Portuguese Restoration War in 1640, Soares entered the Portuguese army as a common soldier. After the war, he fell into a life of idleness and gambling. In 1653 he was forced to flee to Bahia in the Portuguese colony of Brazil as the result of a duel. There he continued to lead a dissolute life, but was converted through the writings of the Dominican friar Louis of Granada and promised God that he would change his ways.

=== Friar Minor ===
When Soares returned to Portugal in 1656, he returned to his former life of dissipation, until, in 1662, he was taken with a grievous illness. Upon his recovery he hastened to fulfill his promise, and was admitted into the Franciscan Order in May of the same year, receiving the religious name by which he is now known. He entered the branch of the Friars Minor which led a strict life of penance and asceticism, following the principles for the reform of the Order led by Peter of Alcantara.

António das Chagas then dedicated his life to one of preaching the Catholic faith throughout the countryside of southern Portugal. Determined to lead his audiences to a more spiritual life than he had lived, his preaching was known for a level of theatricality and extreme fervor which led to criticism of him by some of his contemporaries, such as noted Jesuit preacher, António Vieira.

In 1680 António received an Apostolic Brief from Pope Innocent XI which separated him from obedience to the Franciscan Province of Algarve. He then went to the Varatojo friary, in Torres Vedras, near Lisbon, where he dedicated himself to teaching friars preparing to serve as missionaries.

António died there on 20 October 1682 in leaving a great part of his writings still unpublished. His remains are preserved in a tomb in the chapter room of the friary.

== Works ==
António became famous posthumously after the publication of his poetical and ascetic writings, in which he combined erudition with elegance of style.

The following were published posthumously:

- "Faíscas de amor divino e lágrimas da alma" (Lisbon, 1683);
- "Obras espirituais" (Lisbon, 1684–1687);
- "O Padre nosso comentado" (Lisbon, 1688);
- "Espelho do Espírito em que deve ver-se e compor-se a Alma" etc. (Lisbon, 1683);
- "Escola da penitência e flagelo dos pecadores" (Lisbon, 1687);
- "Sermões Genuínos" etc. (Lisbon, 1690);
- "Cartas espirituais" (Lisbon, 1684);
- "Ramalhete espiritual" etc. (Lisbon, 1722).
