= René Le Bossu =

17th-century French literary critic

René Le Bossu or le Bossu (16 March 1631 – 14 March 1680) was a French literary critic.

Le Bossu was born in Paris, studied at Nanterre, and in 1649 became one of the regular canons of the Abbey of St Genevieve. His published his first book, Parallèle des principes de la physique d'Aristote et de celle de René Descartes, in 1674. The book aimed to show that the principles of Aristotle and René Descartes were more similar than generally thought. This book was indifferently received.

His second book, Traité du poème épique, was published in 1675 on epic poetry. It was highly praised by Nicolas Boileau-Despréaux. Its leading doctrine was that the subject should be chosen before the characters, and that the action should be arranged without reference to the personages who are to figure in the scene. This book was reprinted in several editions, and was translated into English.

== Works ==
- Bossu, René Le (1674). Parallèle des principes de la physique d'Aristote et de celle de René Descartes (in French). Paris: Michel Le Petit – via Google Books.
- Traité du poème épique, par René Le Bossu [Treatise on the epic poem] (in French). Paris: Michel le Petit. 1675 – via Google Books.
  - English translation: Monsieur Bossu's Treatise of the Epick Poem. Translated by The W.J. (2nd ed.). London: J. Knapton and H. Clements. 1719 – via Google Books.
