= Davenant Foundation School =

Location
- Chester Road; Loughton, Essex, IG10 2LD; England; 51°39′45″N 0°05′05″E

Information
- Type: Academy
- Motto: Nurturing mind, body and spirit
- Religious affiliation: Christian
- Established: 1680; 346 years ago
- Department for Education URN: 136625 Tables
- Ofsted: Reports
- Headteacher: Mr Adam Thorne
- Gender: Coeducational
- Age: 11 to 18
- Enrolment: 1078
- Houses: Gillingham, Salisbury, Whitechapel
- Website: http://www.davenantschool.co.uk/

Davenant Foundation School is a Christian Ecumenical secondary school, founded in 1680, currently in Loughton, Essex, England.

== History ==
=== Foundation in Whitechapel ===
In February 1680 the Reverend Ralph Davenant, rector of St Mary's Whitechapel, drew up his will, leaving all of his household goods and plate to his wife with the provision that it should eventually be sold and that the monies raised should be used to build a school for 40 boys of Whitechapel in the East End of London.

In addition to this bequest, a number of properties were also given over to the school so that rents and capital could be raised. These consisted of a farm at Sandon near Chelmsford, the site of Tilbury Fort and land on which the London, Tilbury and Southend Railway was built. Funds raised thereby went towards the additional educating of 34 poor girls. Boys were to learn reading, writing and arithmetic, whilst the girls were to learn reading, writing and sewing.

A site for the proposed school was found in the Whitechapel Road on the Lower Burial Ground. The old school buildings still stand there.

In 1813, Davenant earned itself the title of 'Cradle of the National Schools of England'.

=== Monitorial system ===
Dr Andrew Bell invented a system for educating hundreds of children with only one Master assisted by senior boys. This became known as the monitorial system. 1,000 children (600 boys and 400 girls) were educated by this system in a new building which was erected in Davenant Street.

The charity school continued to function in the original buildings which were eventually enlarged in 1818 to accommodate 100 boys and 100 girls. The school by now maintained two institutions educating 1,200 children – extraordinarily large for 1818. The third strand of the school came into being in 1858 when a Commercial or Grammar School was built in Leman Street under the direction of the Reverend Welden Champneys, the then rector of Whitechapel. In 1888 the two charities of Whitechapel and Davenant merged to become 'The Foundation School'.

=== New buildings ===
In 1896, the new Renaissance Building was erected behind the 1818 building providing additional classroom space and an assembly hall which remains. In 1939 the school was evacuated and the buildings were taken over by the Heavy Rescue Service. In 1944 the school became Davenant Foundation Grammar School for Boys, a title which it retained until 1980. By then it educated only some 200 boys.

=== Move to Loughton ===
In 1965, at the invitation of the Essex County Council, the school moved to the suburb of Loughton.

=== Comprehensive and coeducational school ===
The school continued as a two-form entry boys' grammar school until 1980. In that year Her Majesty Queen Elizabeth the Queen Mother made her second visit to the school, to celebrate 300 years since its founding. The school returned to co-educational status and developed as a Christian Ecumenical School for 1,000 girls and boys. The school also gained specialist status as a Language College and a Sports College.

=== Davenant International ===
Davenant International was a student forum on global issues launched by the students of the school. It launched in September 2005. Davenant International was formed against a backdrop of increased awareness and concern for social justice and a stand against world poverty. Davenant International, was headed by Mr Lennox Morris-Whitehead, a science teacher at the school. The students heeded the call to take global issues such as Make Poverty History, Aids, The Tsunami Disaster, Children of Chernobyl seriously:

'We live in one world. What we do affects others, and what others do affects us, as never before. To recognise that we are all members of a world community and that we all have responsibilities to each other is not romantic rhetoric, but modern economic and social reality.'

'The school curriculum should contribute to the development of pupils' sense of identity through knowledge and understanding of the spiritual, moral, social and cultural heritages of Britain's diverse society and of the local, national....and global dimensions of their lives....the schools curriculum should...secure their commitment to sustainable development at a personal local, national and global level.'

Her Majesty Queen Elizabeth II sent her best wishes to all those present for a successful and enjoyable event. The former president of South Africa, Nelson Mandela also sent his warm greetings to Davenant students. Former British prime minister, John Major, writing to the students in Loughton hoped that they would take these issues seriously.

The prime minister of the United Kingdom, Tony Blair in a special message to Davenant students said: 'I am delighted to hear about the launch of 'Davenant International'. The forum will provide an opportunity for pupils to debate and discuss a range of global issues in a lively and meaningful way. It is essential that all young people be given the opportunity to learn about the global community of which they are a part. I wish the school every success in fostering the enthusiasm and creativeness of their pupils through this forum and their future work in this area.'

Lee Scott MP, speaking to Davenant students said: 'You are our future. You must make sure you make that difference that I think you can make.'

Headteacher Christopher Seward said: 'Congratulations to the students who have worked hard in getting Davenant International launched and to Mr. Ivan Corea (Head of Religious Education) who worked hard in giving this some vision and then making it a reality.'

=== Academy ===
The school converted to academy status on 1 April 2011.

=== Television ===
Davenant students appeared on Channel 4's Teens programme in 2015.

== Rugby ==
The school has been on four rugby tours so far; Canada, New Zealand, South Africa and South America. On the tour to South Africa the team won 3 matches out of 5; while on this tour Davenant played a team which came from the local townships. The Canada tour in 1994 was more successful as all 5 games were won.

== Notable former pupils and staff ==
- James Brokenshire, Conservative MP for Hornchurch since 2005. He was appointed the Northern Ireland Secretary in July 2016 in Theresa May's cabinet.
- Sir Samuel Goldman, civil servant and banker
- Phil Piratin, Communist MP for Mile End from 1945 to 1950
- Sir Martin Roth, Professor of Psychiatry at the University of Cambridge from 1977 to 1985 and president of the Royal College of Psychiatrists from 1971 to 1975
- Leslie Solley, Labour MP for Thurrock from 1945 to 1950 (expelled from the Labour Party in 1949 for opposing the North Atlantic Treaty)
- Carl Jenkinson, Charlton Athletic, Arsenal and West Ham United footballer, 2003–10
- Nina Mackay, Metropolitan Police Constable killed in the line of duty in 1997
- Robert Pedre, Commander United Kingdom Strike Force
- Naomi Scott, actress, singer and musician, star of Aladdin
- James Bransgrove, Colchester United footballer

== Cycling event ==
The school was the start and end point for the 2017 London–Edinburgh–London cycle ride.

== Arms ==
Coat of arms of Davenant Foundation School
Notes Granted on 9 November 1961. Crest On a wreath Argent, Gules and Sable, a lymphad Sable, pennons and flags flying Gules, at the masthead a beacon enflamed Proper, the sail charged with the Arms. Escutcheon Gules, three escallops between seven cross crosslets fitchee, three, one, two, and one, Argent, within a bordure of the same charged with eight lows of flame Proper.

== See also ==
- Davenant Centre
- The History of the Davenant Foundation Grammar School by Roland R. Reynolds, M.A., Former Headmaster
- The Davenant Foundation Grammar School: The War Years 1939 - 1945. Edited by Arnold A. Zimmerman. ISBN 0-934314-49-7. (LCCN 00-13242)
