= Mary Hughes (social worker) =

English social worker

Mary "May" Hughes (1860–1941. Apr 2nd) was an English social worker in Whitechapel.

== Biography ==
Born at 80 Park Street, Mayfair, Mary was the youngest daughter of Thomas Hughes, Christian Socialist and author of Tom Brown's Schooldays.

At the age of 23, she left home to become housekeeper for her uncle John Hughes, a vicar in Berkshire, and in 1892 joined the local Board of Guardians, who helped run the local workhouses. She reportedly caused controversy by suggesting the paupers who lived in the workhouses might be allowed to drink tea twice a day instead of once. The resulting row lasted several months, but Mary got her way in the end.

In 1895, her uncle died, and Mary went to live with her sister Lily, wife of the Rev. Ernest Carter, in Whitechapel, East London, and soon joined the Board of Guardians for Stepney. After her sister and brother-in-law drowned on the Titanic, in 1915 Mary moved to live with friends, Doris and Muriel Lester, in the buildings that were later to become Kingsley Hall, Bow.

She joined the Quakers in 1918 and moved back to Whitechapel, living in the Blackwall Buildings continuing her work as a poor law Guardian and volunteer visitor to the local infirmary and children's home.

In 1926, Mary acquired an old pub, the Earl Grey, 71 Vallance Road, Whitechapel, which she turned into a refuge, renaming it the Dewdrop Inn (a pun on 'Do Drop In'). Here, Mary slept in a tiny room near the front door on a sort of padded bench, which she often gave up to homeless woman. She would go without food to feed others, and more than once ended up in hospital with bronchitis from sleeping on the cold stone floor. When a passage about her life was being considered for the 1949 Quaker publication, Christian Faith and Practice, an objection was made to her being described as 'sometimes verminous'. However, the words were accepted when someone declared "Her lice were her glory!" (the resulting paragraphs on her can now be read online).

She was well known in the area. Beth Allen remembers: She used to wave her umbrella and step out to cross the road, saying "The dear trams, they always stop for me" until one day a tram didn't stop. She was knocked down, but refused to be put in an ambulance until she had written down on a piece of paper, "It was not the tram driver's fault, it was my fault. Mary Hughes." She was taken to hospital and when told that she was getting better faster than expected, she sat up in bed and shouted "Three cheers for vegetarianism and teetotalism!"

In early 1941, she began to fail and was taken to St. Peter's Hospital nearby, where she died on 2 April. There is a blue plaque commemorating her on the side of the old Dewdrop Inn building and she is remembered in a panel in the Quaker Tapestry. Soon after she died, her close friend and fellow Quaker and social activist published a biography of Mary Hughes. 'Mary was among ‘that great passing generation of Christian Socialists’ wrote Rosa, ‘to whom the Labour Party owes so much and acknowledges so little'.
