= Whitechapel =

Area in London, England

Coordinates: 51°30′59″N 0°04′09″W

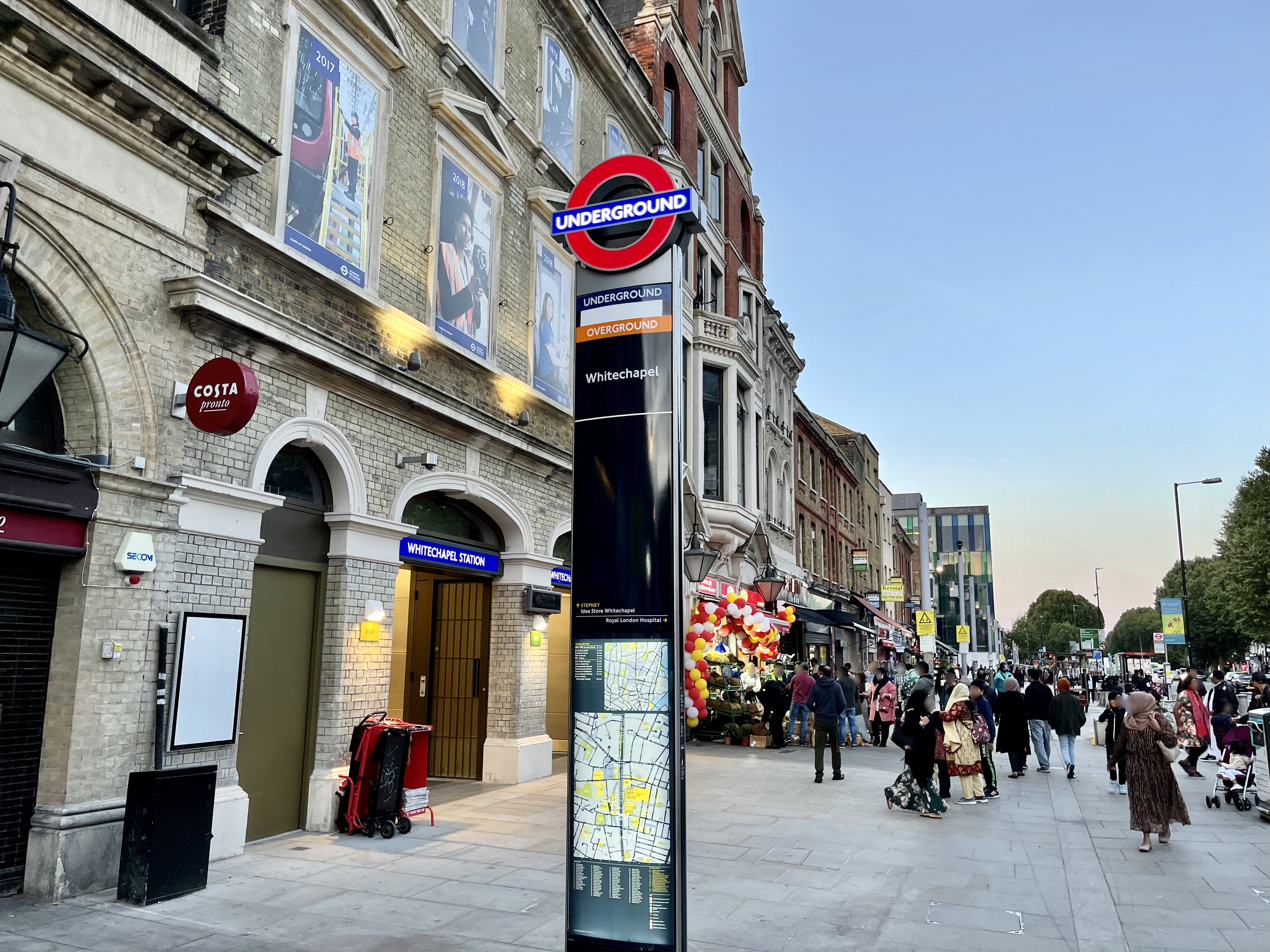
- Entrance to Whitechapel station

- Location within Greater London
- Population: 14,862 (Whitechapel ward 2011)
- OS grid reference: TQ335815
- London borough: Tower Hamlets
- Ceremonial county: Greater London
- Region: London
- Country: England
- Sovereign state: United Kingdom
- Post town: LONDON
- Postcode district: E1
- Dialling code: 020
- Police: Metropolitan
- Fire: London
- Ambulance: London
- UK Parliament: Bethnal Green and Stepney
- London Assembly: City and East

Whitechapel (/ˈwaɪtˌtʃæpəl/) is an area in the London Borough of Tower Hamlets, London, England. It is in East London and part of the East End. It is the location of Tower Hamlets Town Hall and the borough town centre. It is located approximately 3.4 miles (5.5 km) east of Charing Cross. Before the creation of Greater London, it was part of the historic county of Middlesex.

The district is primarily built around Whitechapel High Street and Whitechapel Road, which extend from the City of London boundary to just east of Whitechapel station. These two streets together form a section of the originally Roman road from the Aldgate to Colchester, a route that later became known as the Great Essex Road. Population growth resulting from ribbon development along this route led to the creation of the parish of Whitechapel, a daughter parish of Stepney, from which it was separated in the 14th century.

Whitechapel has long been known for its diverse immigrant communities. From the late 19th century until the late 20th century the area had a very high Jewish population, with multiple Yiddish-language theatres, newspapers and synagogues. Much of this community moved away after the area suffered extensive bomb damage during the Blitz in the Second World War. It subsequently became a significant settlement for the British Bangladeshi community, which now makes up approximately 40% of the population of Whitechapel. According to the 2021 UK census, 56.3% of Whitechapel residents identify as Asian, 28.8% as White, 6.6% as Black, 4.1% as Mixed, and 4.3% as Other.

Whitechapel and neighbouring Spitalfields were the locations of the infamous 11 Whitechapel murders (1888–91), some of which were attributed to the unidentified serial killer known as Jack the Ripper. These factors and others have led to Whitechapel being seen by many as the embodiment of London's East End, and for that reason it is often used to represent the East End in art and literature.

Landmarks include the Royal London Hospital, the Whitechapel Gallery, and the East London Mosque, one of the largest mosques in Western Europe.

== History ==
=== Origin and toponymy ===
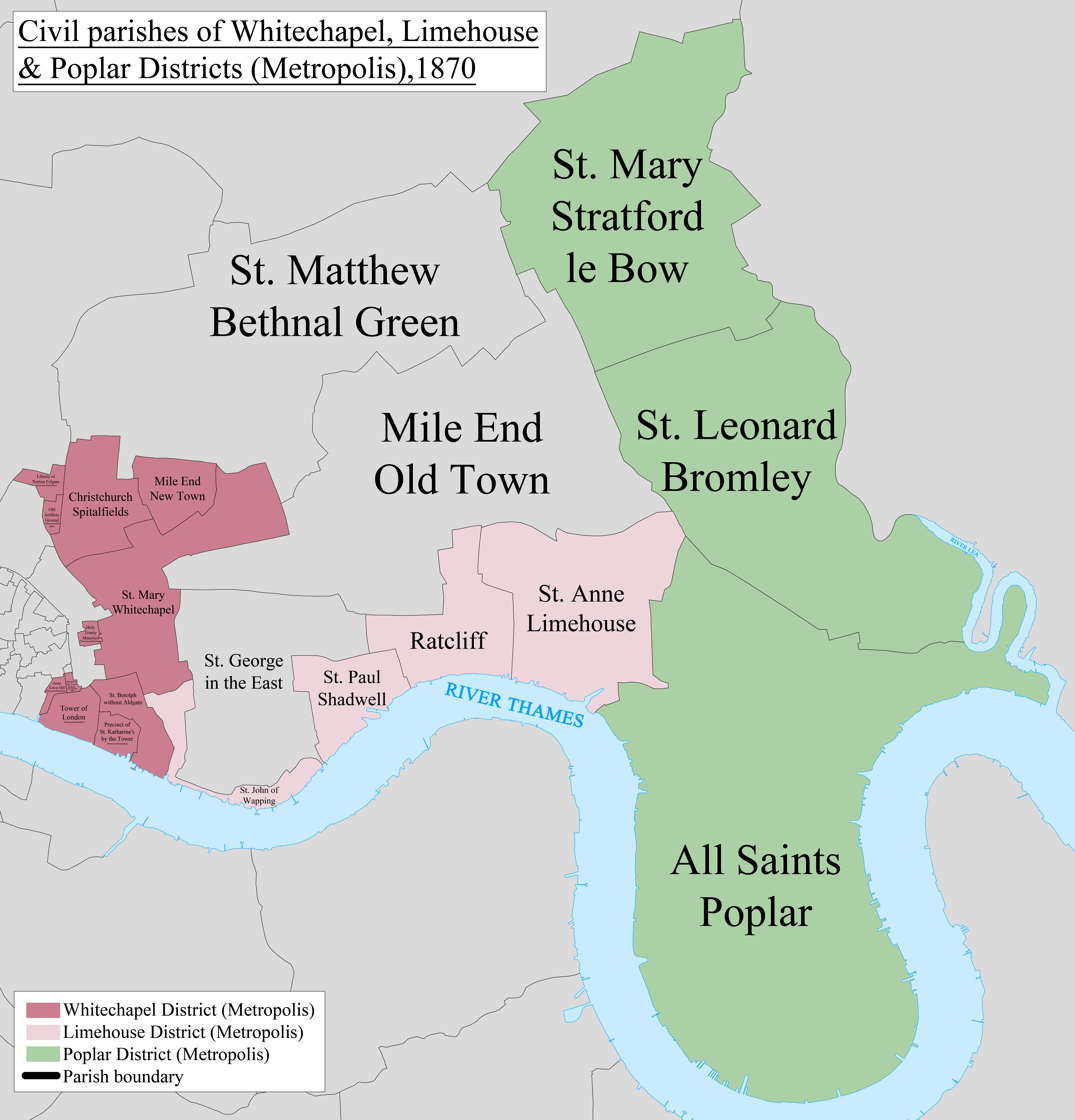
The daughter-parishes of Stepney that would evolve into the modern London Borough of Tower Hamlets

Whitechapel was originally part of the Manor and Parish of Stepney, but population growth resulting from its position just outside the Aldgate on the Roman Road to Essex resulted in significant population growth, so a chapel of ease, dedicated to St Mary was established so people did not have to make the longer journey to Stepney's parish church St Dunstans. The earliest known rector was Hugh de Fulbourne in 1329. Whitechapel was historically part of Middlesex.

Whitechapel takes its name from the church, St Mary Matfelon, which like the nearby White Tower of the Tower of London was at one time whitewashed to give it a prominent and attractive appearance. The etymology of the Matfelon element is unclear and apparently unique.

Around 1338, Whitechapel became an independent parish, with St Mary Matfelon, originally a chapel of ease within Stepney, becoming the parish church.

=== Geography of the ancient parish ===
Whitechapel's spine is the old Roman Road, that ran from the Aldgate on London's Wall, to Colchester in Essex (Roman Britannia's first capital), and beyond. This road, which was later named the Great Essex Road, is now designated the A11. This historic route has the names Whitechapel High Street and Whitechapel Road as it passes through, or along the boundary, of Whitechapel. For many centuries travellers to and from London on this route were accommodated at the many coaching inns that lined Whitechapel High Street.

The area of the parish extended around 1400 metres from the City of London boundary, originally marked by Aldgate Bars around 180 metres east of the Aldgate itself, to vicinity of the junction with Cambridge Heath Road where it met the boundaries of Mile End and Bethnal Green.

The northern boundary included Wentworth Street and parts of Old Montague Street. The parish also included an area around Goodman's Fields, close to the City and south of St Mary's, the parish church.

=== Administrative history ===
The parish of Whitechapel formed three of the wards, in the Metropolitan Borough of Stepney, which was created in 1900.

The area became an independent parish around 1338. At that time parish areas only had an ecclesiastical (church) function, with parallel civil parishes being formed in the Tudor period. The original purpose of the civil parishes was poor relief. The area was part of the historic (or ancient) county of Middlesex, but military and most (or all) civil county functions were managed more locally, by the Tower Division (also known as the Tower Hamlets).

The role of the Tower Division ended when Whitechapel became part of the new County of London in 1889, and most civil parish functions were removed when the area joined the Metropolitan Borough of Stepney in 1900. On 1 April 1927 the parish was abolished and merged with Stepney. At the 1921 census (the last before the abolition of the parish), Whitechapel had a population of 53,855.

In 1965 there was a further round of changes when the Metropolitan Borough of Stepney merged with the Metropolitan Borough of Bethnal Green and the Metropolitan Borough of Poplar to form the new London Borough of Tower Hamlets. The new borough of Tower Hamlets covered only part of the historic Tower Division (or Tower Hamlets). At the same time, the area became part of the new Greater London, which replaced the older, smaller County of London.

=== Early history ===
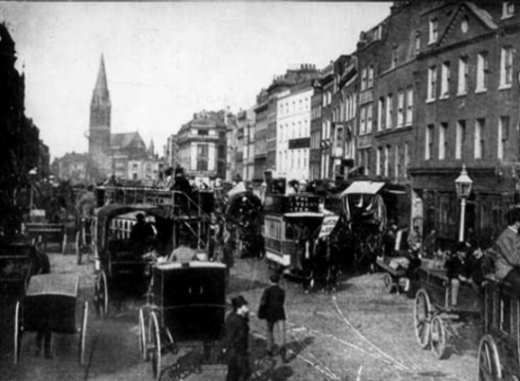
Whitechapel High Street, and St Mary Matfelon, in 1905

==== Early development ====
Whitechapel, along with areas such as neighbouring Shoreditch, Holborn (west of the city) and Southwark (south of the Thames), was one of London's earlier extra-mural suburbs. Beyond controls of the City of London Corporation, Whitechapel was used for more polluting and land-intensive industries the city market demanded, such as tanneries, builders' goods yards, laundries, clothes dyers, slaughterhouse-related work, soaperies, and breweries. Whitechapel was strongly notable for foundries, foremost of which was the Whitechapel Bell Foundry, which later cast Philadelphia's Liberty Bell, Westminster's Big Ben, Bow Bells and more recently the London Olympic Bell in 2012. Population shifts from rural areas to London from the 17th century to the mid-19th century resulted in great numbers of more or less destitute people taking up residence amidst the industries, businesses and services ancillary to the City of London that had attracted them.

==== Whitechapel Mount ====
The Whitechapel Mount was a large, probably artificial mound, of unknown origin, that stood on the south side of Whitechapel Road, about 1200 metres east of the Aldgate, immediately west of the modern Royal London Hospital. The Mount is widely believed to have formed part of London's defences during the Wars of the Three Kingdoms in the mid-17th century. This was either as part of a ring of fortifications known as the Lines of Communication, which were in operation from 1642 to 1647, or additionally or alternatively, as one of the three forts replacing that system of defence immediately afterwards.

The mount was removed to allow residential development in 1807–1808.

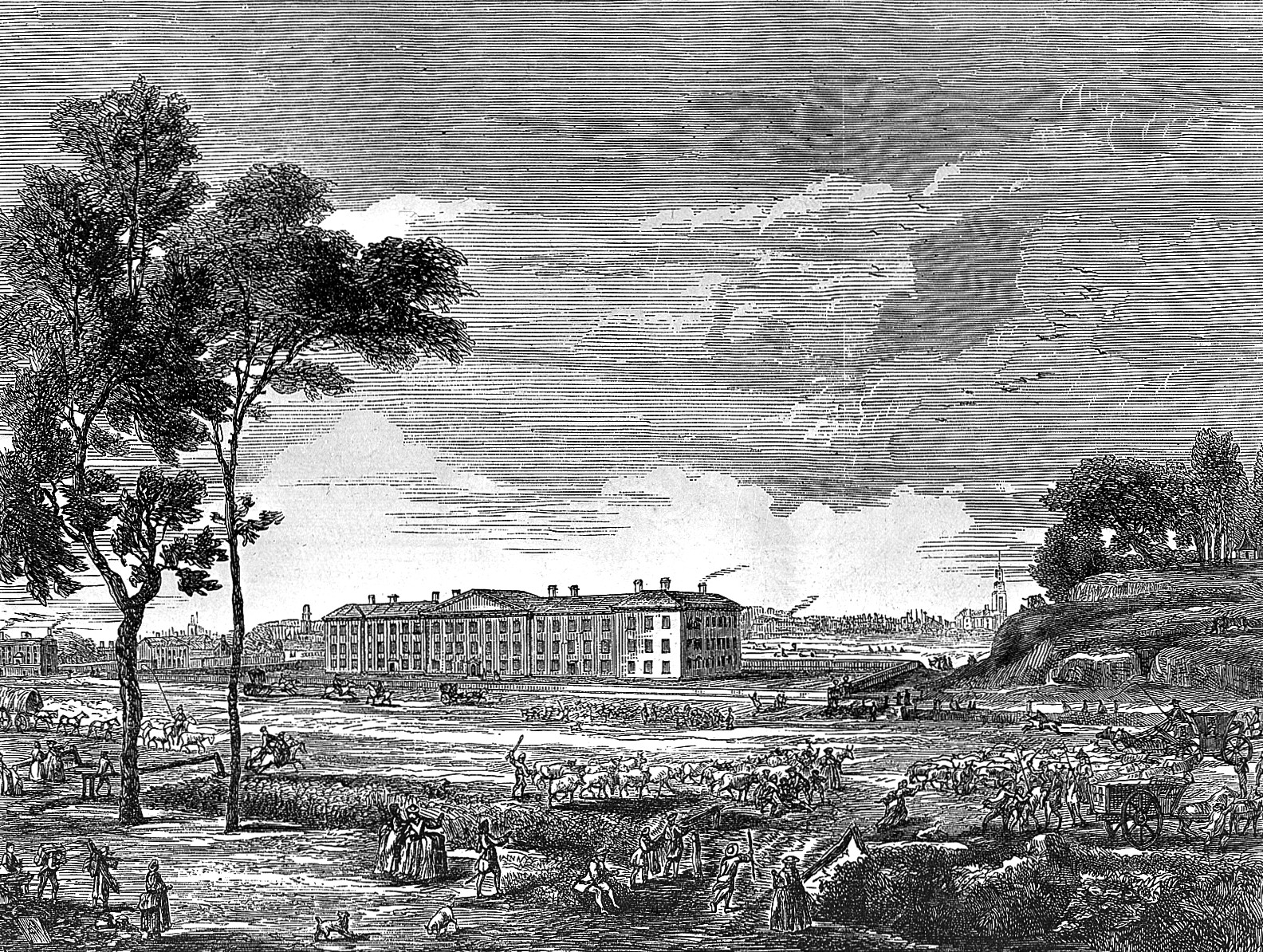
The London Hospital, Whitechapel in 1753. The Whitechapel Mount stands immediately to the right (west).

==== Davenant Foundation School ====
In 1680, Ralph Davenant (rector of the parish of Whitechapel), his wife and his sister-in-law bequeathed a large sum for a schoolmaster to teach literacy, numeracy and the "principles of the Church of England" to forty boys of the parish. In the same deed Henry and Sarah Gullifer undertook to provide for the education of thirty poor girls; namely a schoolmistress was to teach them the "catechism, reading, knitting, plain sewing, and any other useful work". In 1701 an unknown donor gave the foundation £1,000 (equivalent to £180,000 in 2025) so the children might be suitably clothed as well as educated. Between 1783 and 1830 the school received twenty gifts totalling over £5,000. Typical income seems to have been about £500 per year, which was much more than most vicar's and rector's livings, net. Supporting modern education, the Davenant Centre continues and the Davenant Foundation School has, since 1966, been based at Loughton in Essex.

==== Royal London Hospital ====
The London Infirmary was established as a voluntary hospital in 1740, and within a year soon moved from Finsbury to Prescot Street, a very densely populated and deprived part of southern Whitechapel. Its aim was "The relief of all sick and diseased persons and, in particular, manufacturers, seamen in the merchant service and their wives and children".

The hospital moved to the then largely rural Whitechapel Road site in 1757, and was renamed the London Hospital. It became known as the Royal London Hospital on its 250th anniversary in 1990. The new building, adjacent to the old building it replaced, was opened in 2012.

In 2023 the old hospital building became the new Tower Hamlets Town Hall, replacing the Mulberry Place site in Poplar.

=== 18th and 19th centuries ===
In common with many other parts of the East End of London, Whitechapel gained a reputation for severe poverty, overcrowding, and the social problems that came with it.

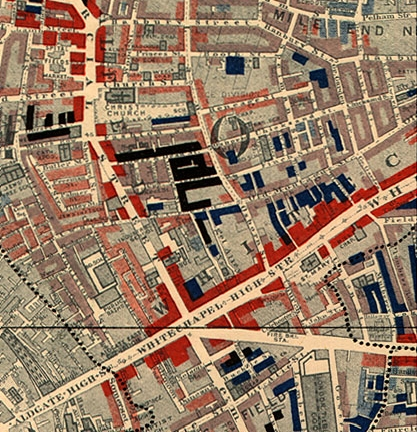
Part of Charles Booth's map of Whitechapel, 1889. The red areas are "middle-class"; the black areas are "semi-criminal".

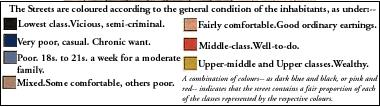
Colour key for Booth's poverty map

William Booth began his Christian Revival Society, preaching the gospel in a tent, erected in the Friends Burial Ground, Thomas Street, Whitechapel, in 1865. Others joined his Christian Mission, and on 7 August 1878 the Salvation Army was formed at a meeting held at 272 Whitechapel Road. A statue commemorates both his mission and his work in helping the poor.

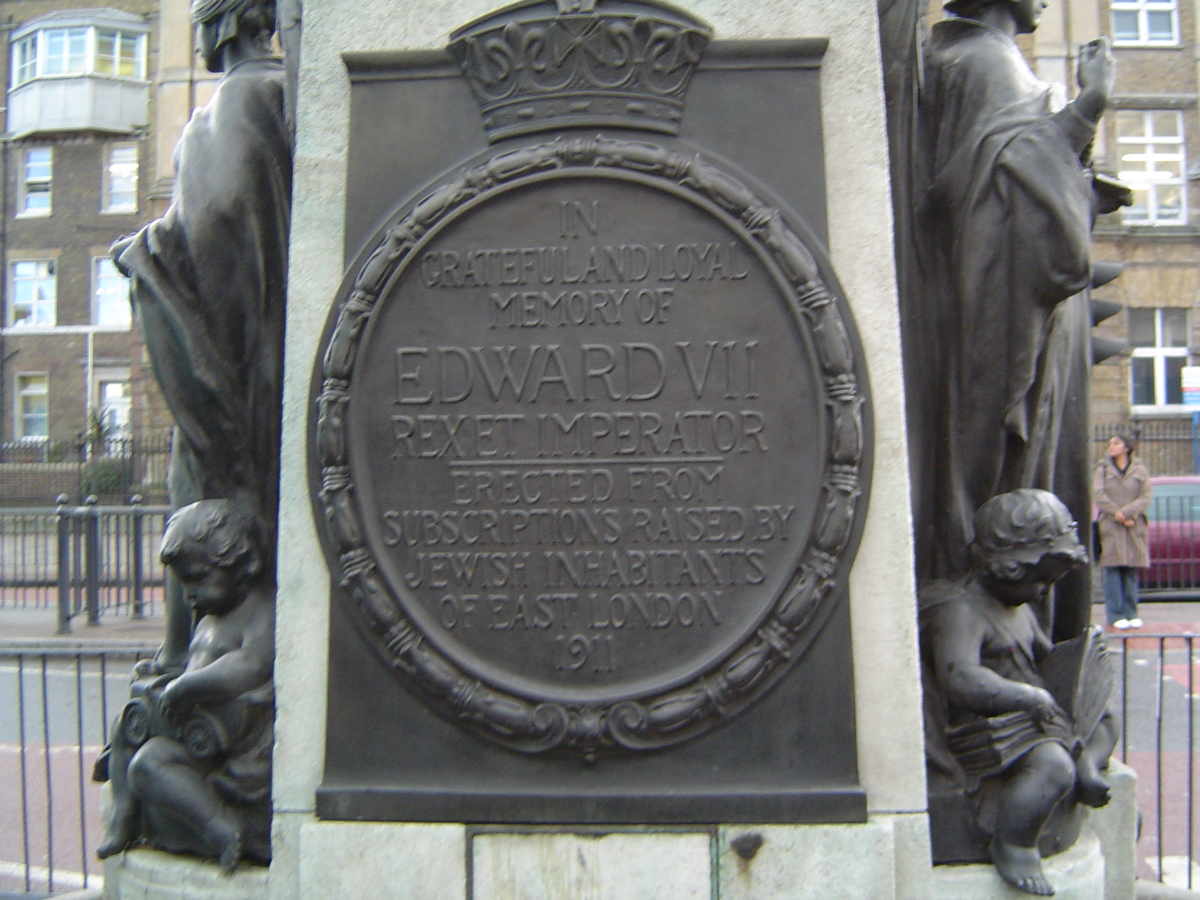
Plaque commemorating King Edward VII, with the inscription "erected with subscriptions raised by Jewish inhabitants of East London 1911"

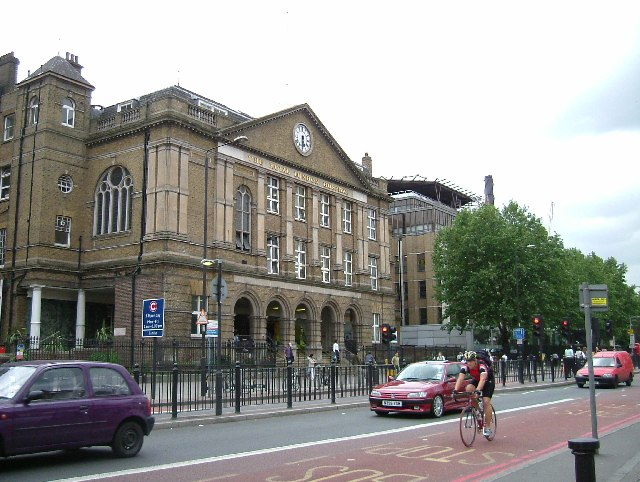
Royal London Hospital's old building from the 18th century

The population grew quickly with migrants from the English countryside and further afield. Many of these incomers were Irish or Jewish. Western Whitechapel, and neighbouring areas of Wapping, became known as Little Germany due to the large numbers of German people who came to the area; many of these people, and their descendants, worked in the sugar industry. The St George's German Lutheran Church on Alie Street is a legacy of that part of the community.

Writing of the period 1883–1884, Yiddish theatre actor Jacob Adler wrote, "The further we penetrated into this Whitechapel, the more our hearts sank. Was this London? Never in Russia, never later in the worst slums of New York, were we to see such poverty as in the London of the 1880s."

This endemic poverty drove many women to prostitution. In October 1888 the Metropolitan Police estimated that there were 1,200 prostitutes "of very low class" resident in Whitechapel and about 62 brothels. Reference is specifically made to them in Charles Booth's Life and Labour of the People in London, especially to dwellings called Blackwall Buildings belonging to Blackwall Railway. Such prostitutes were numbered amongst the 11 Whitechapel murders (1888–1891), some of which were committed by the serial killer known as "Jack the Ripper". These attacks caused widespread terror in the district and throughout the country and drew the attention of social reformers to the squalor and vice of the area, even though these crimes remain unsolved today.

London County Council, founded 1889, helped deliver investment in new housing and slum clearance; objectives which were a popular cause at the time.

The "Elephant Man" Joseph Merrick (1862–1890) became well known in Whitechapel – he was exhibited in a shop on the Whitechapel Road before being helped by Frederick Treves (1853–1923) at the Royal London Hospital, opposite the actual shop. There is a museum in the hospital about his life.

=== 20th century ===
In 1902, American author Jack London, looking to write a counterpart to Jacob Riis's seminal book How the Other Half Lives, donned ragged clothes and boarded in Whitechapel, detailing his experiences in The People of the Abyss.

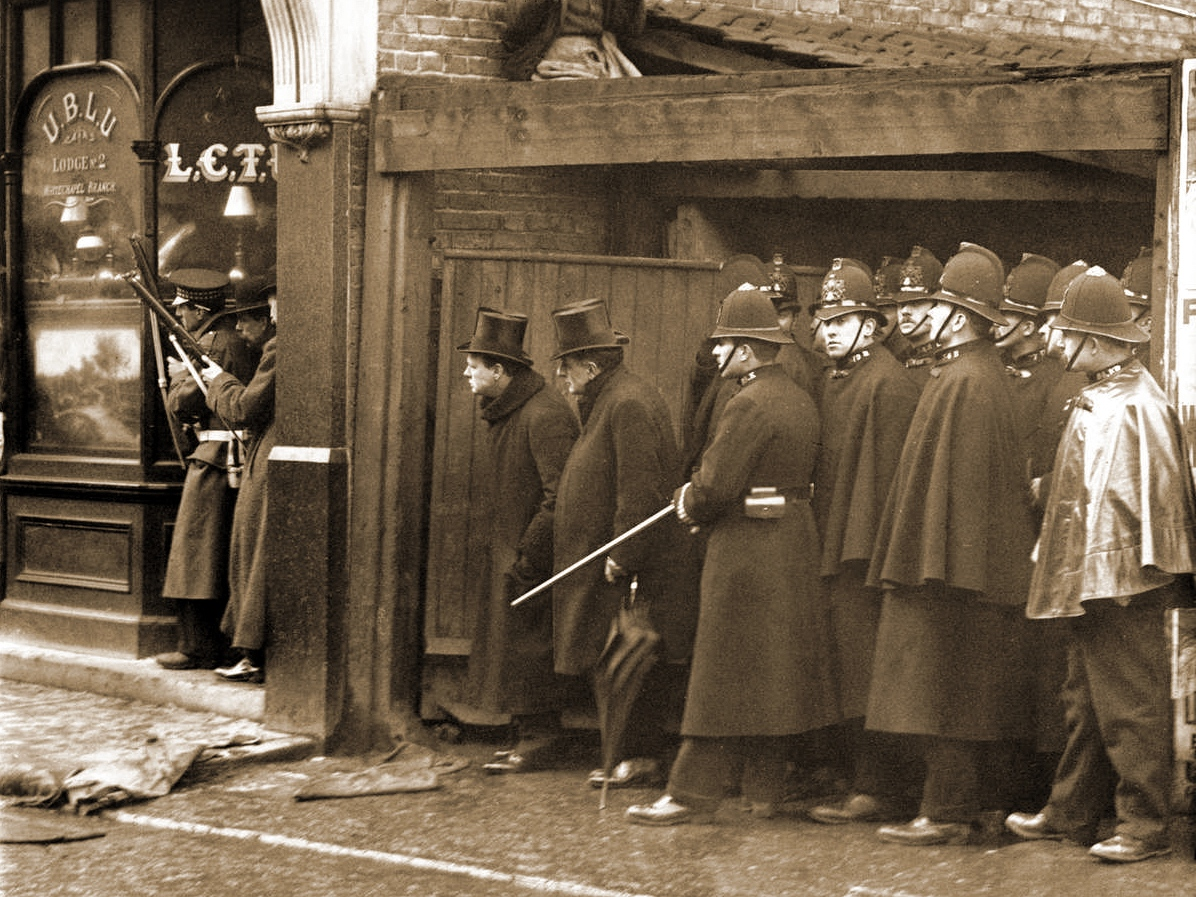
Home Secretary Winston Churchill observing the events at Sidney Street, Whitechapel

The Siege of Sidney Street (also known as the Battle of Stepney, after the Metropolitan Borough of Stepney of which Whitechapel was part) in January 1911 was a gunfight between police and military forces, and Latvian revolutionaries. Then Home Secretary Winston Churchill took over the operation, and his presence caused a political row over the level of his involvement during the time. His biographers disagreed and claimed that he gave no operational commands to the police, but a Metropolitan Police account states that the events of Sidney Street were "a very rare case of a Home Secretary taking police operational command decisions". (Note: Subsequent stories that a bullet passed through Churchill's top hat are apocryphal, and no reference to such an occurrence appears in either the official records, or Churchill's accounts of the siege.)

The Freedom Press, a socialist publishing house, thought it worthwhile to explore conditions in the leading city of the nation that had invented modern capitalism. He concluded that English poverty was far rougher than the American variety. The juxtaposition of the poverty, homelessness, exploitative work conditions, prostitution, and infant mortality of Whitechapel and other East End locales with some of the greatest personal wealth the world has ever seen made it a focal point for leftist reformers and revolutionaries of all kinds, from George Bernard Shaw, whose Fabian Society met regularly in Whitechapel, to Vladimir Lenin, who led rallies in Whitechapel during his exile from Russia. The area is still home to Freedom Press, the anarchist publishing house founded by Charlotte Wilson.

During World War I, "Little Germany" was destroyed by riots and the men were sent to the Isle of Man, with only a few churches left standing today.

On Sunday 4 October 1936, the British Union of Fascists led by Oswald Mosley, intended to march through the East End, an area with a large Jewish population. The BUF mustered on and around Tower Hill and hundreds of thousands of local people turned out to block the march. There were violent clashes with the BUF around Tower Hill, but most of the violence occurred as police tried to clear a route through the crowds for the BUF to follow.

The police fought protesters at nearby Cable Street – the series of clashes becoming known as the Battle of Cable Street – and Tower Hill, but the largest confrontations took place at Aldgate and Whitechapel, notably at Gardiner's Corner, at the junction of Leman Street, Commercial Street and Whitechapel High Street.

The Halal restaurant on the junction of St Mark Street and Alie Street opened in 1939 to serve the many Indian seamen living in the area. It is now the oldest Indian restaurant in East London.

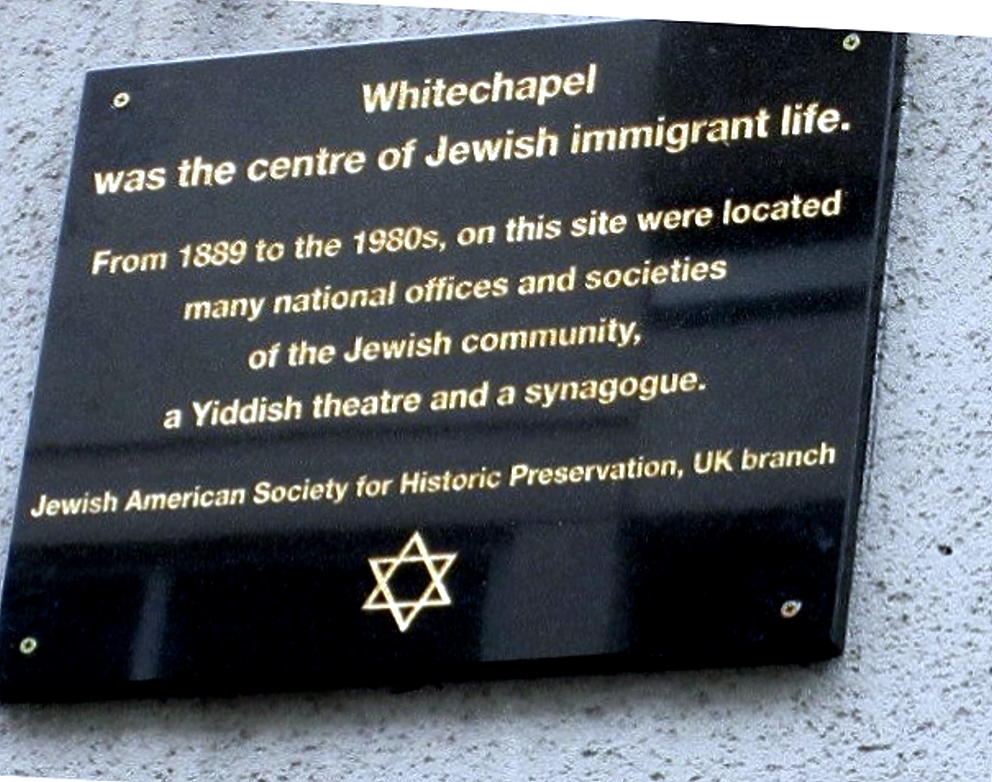
Whitechapel was the centre of British Jewish refugee immigrant life in the late 19th and early 20th century.

Whitechapel remained poor through the first half of the 20th century following the end of the Second World War, though somewhat less desperately so. It suffered great damage from enemy bombers during the Blitz, and from the subsequent German V-weapon attacks, leading to widespread rebuilding and the dispersal of much of its Jewish population to suburban districts. The parish church, St Mary Matfelon, was badly damaged in a raid on 29 December 1940, a raid so damaging that it caused the Second Great Fire of London. The remains were demolished in 1952, with St Mary's traced stone footprint and former graveyard remaining as part of Altab Ali Park.

Post-war slum clearance and the decline of the London Docks deepened economic hardship. From the 1950s onwards, the area saw new waves of immigration, notably from South Asia, including Bengali seamen and later Bangladeshi families who established community centres, cafés and mosques.

On 4 May 1978, three teenagers murdered Altab Ali, a 24-year-old Bangladesh-born clothing worker, in a racially motivated attack, as he walked home after work. The attack took place on Adler Street, by St Mary's Churchyard, where St Mary Matfelon had previously stood. The reaction to his murder provoked the mass mobilisation of the local Bengali community. The gardens of the former churchyard were later renamed Altab Ali Park in his memory.

The Metropolitan line between Hammersmith and Whitechapel was withdrawn in 1990 and shown separately as a new line called the Hammersmith & City line.

=== 21st century ===
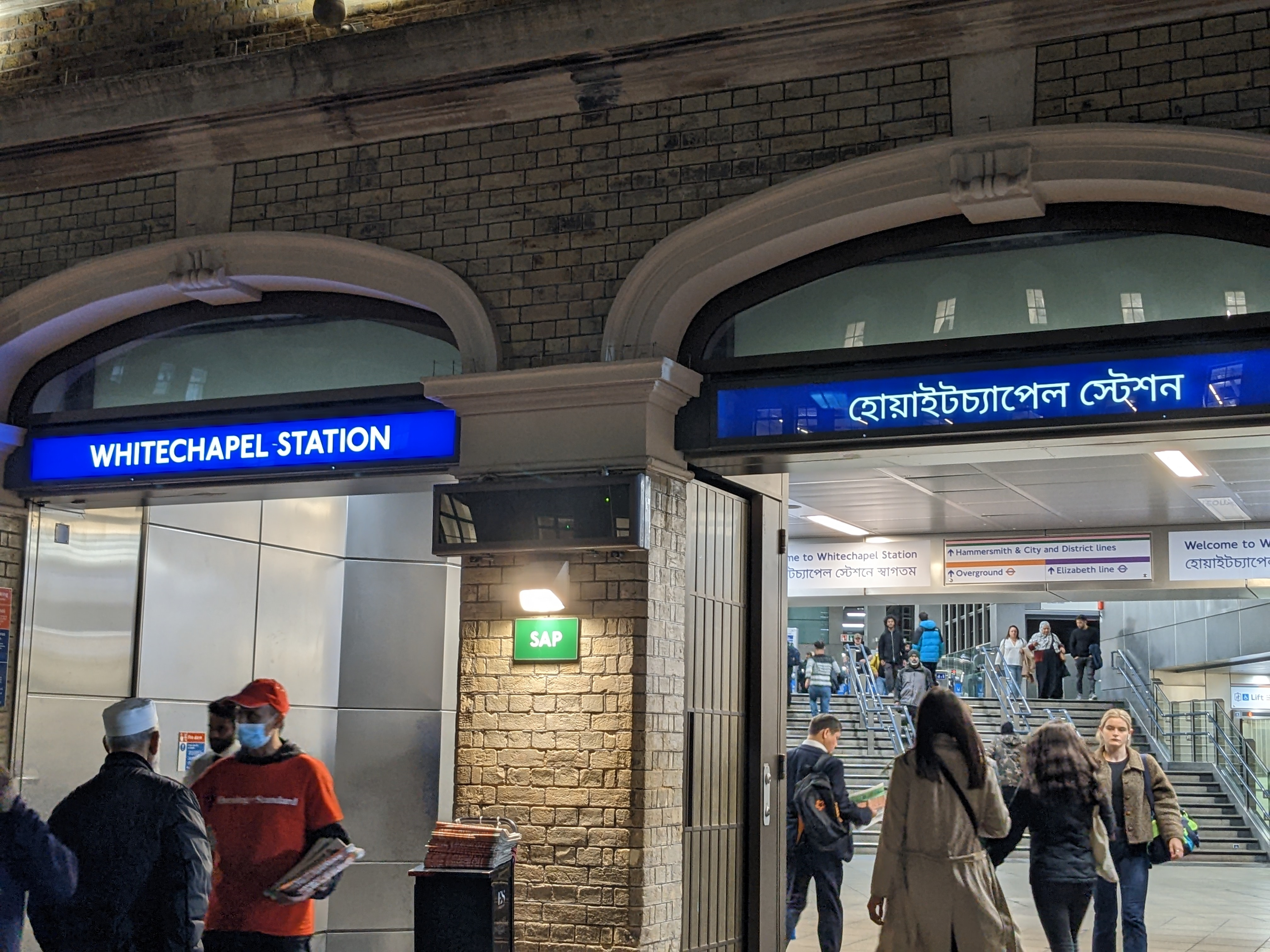
Bengali signage on Whitechapel station

Crossrail calls at Whitechapel station on the Elizabeth line. Eastbound services will be split into two branches after leaving the historic station, which underwent a massive redevelopment that started in 2010.

In order to prepare for Crossrail, in January 2016, the old Whitechapel station was closed for refurbishment and modernisation work in order to improve services and increase capacity in the station.

The Royal London Hospital was closed and re-opened behind the original site in 2012 in a brand new building costing £650 Million. The old site was then repurchased by the local council to open a new town hall, replacing the existing Town Hall at Mulberry Place.

In March 2022, Whitechapel station signs had "হোয়াইটচ্যাপেল" in Bengali installed. The British-Pakistani Mayor of London Sadiq Khan was "delighted" that the signage was installed ahead of Bangladesh Independence Day on 26 March. The installation was attended by Bangladeshi diplomats and Mamata Banerjee, the Chief Minister of West Bengal.

Also in 2022 a historical marker was placed in Whitechapel, on the site of the former Adler House at the junction of Adler and Coke Streets by the Jewish American Society for Historic Preservation UK Branch. Adler House was named in honour of the Chief Rabbi of the British Empire, Herman Adler, 1891–1911. The marker recognises the significance of Whitechapel as the centre of British Jewish refugee life in the late 19th and early 20th centuries.

Whitechapel's Jewish heritage faced a stark modern threat in the mid-2020s when the former East London Central Synagogue on Nelson Street, in East London, was damaged in an arson attack in May 2026. The attack occurred amid a wider rise in antisemitic incidents and hate crime in London, with the Metropolitan Police announcing additional measures to protect the city's Jewish community and stating that hate crime "in all its forms" had increased.

== Governance ==
Local council facilities will be grouped within the old Royal London Hospital building as a civic centre. The local library, now called an Idea Store is located on Whitechapel Road.

== Culture ==
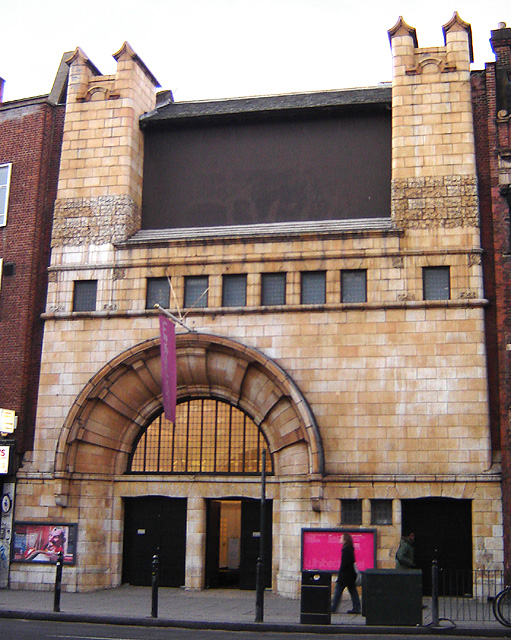
The distinctive tiled frontage of the Whitechapel Art Gallery

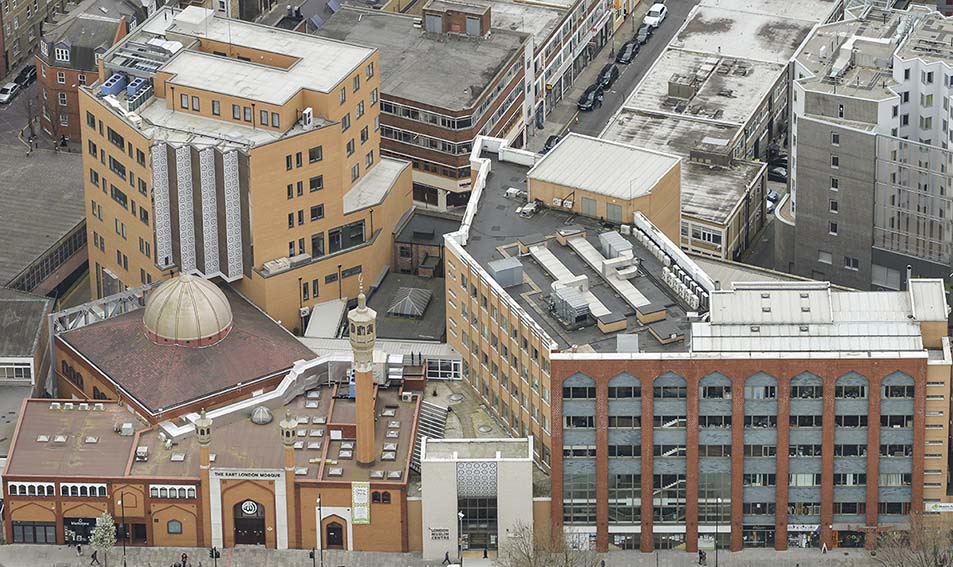
The East London Mosque was one of the first in Britain to be allowed to use loudspeakers to broadcast the adhan.

Whitechapel Road was the location of two 19th-century theatres: The Effingham (1834–1897) and The Pavilion Theatre (1828–1935; building demolished in 1962). Charles Dickens Jr. (eldest child of Charles Dickens), in his 1879 book Dickens's Dictionary of London, described the Pavilion this way: "A large East-end theatre capable of holding considerably over 3,000 persons. Melodrama of a rough type, farce, pantomime, &c." In the early 20th century it became the home of Yiddish theatre, catering to the large Jewish population of the area, and gave birth to the Anglo-Jewish 'Whitechapel Boys' avant-garde literary and artistic movement.

Since at least the 1970s, Whitechapel and other nearby parts of East London have figured prominently in London's art scene. Probably the area's most prominent art venue is the Whitechapel Art Gallery, founded in 1901 and long an outpost of high culture in a poor neighbourhood. As the neighbourhood has gentrified, it has gained citywide, and even international, visibility and support. From 2005 the gallery underwent a major expansion, with the support of £3.26 million from the Heritage Lottery Fund. The expanded facility opened in 2009.

Whitechapel in the early 21st century has figured prominently in London's punk rock and skuzz rock scenes, with the main focal point for this scene being Whitechapel Factory and Rhythm Factory bar, restaurant, and nightclub. This scene includes the likes of The Libertines, Zap!, Nova, The Others, Razorlight, and The Rakes, all of whom have had some commercial success in the music charts.

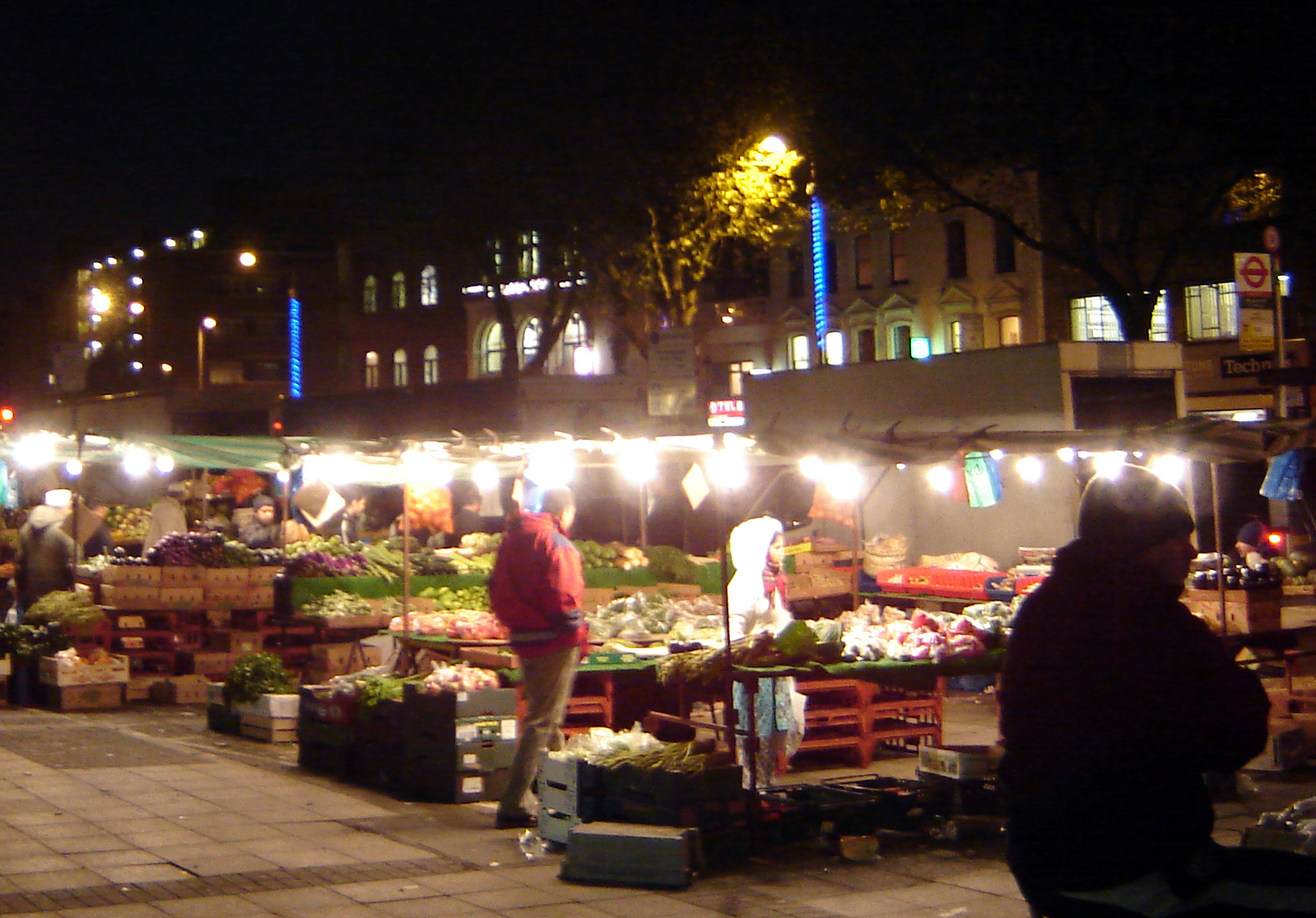
Whitechapel Street Market at night

=== Demographics ===
According to 2024 estimates, Whitechapel has a total population of 22,000.

51.3% of Whitechapel residents identify as Asian, 34.6% as White, 4.9% as Black, 4.5% as Mixed, 1.8% as Arab, and 2.8% as Other. 46.5% identified as Muslim, 28.5% with no religion, 19.7% as Christian, 2.8% as Hindu, 1.1% as Buddhist, 0.4% as Jewish and Sikh, and 0.6% as Other.

The East London Mosque at the end of Whitechapel Road is one of the largest mosques in Europe. The mosque group was established as early as 1910, and the demand grew as the Sylheti community grew rapidly over the years. In 1985, a mosque with a dome and minaret was built in the heart of Whitechapel, attracting thousands of worshippers every week, which was further expanded with the London Muslim Centre in 2004.

A library, the Whitechapel Idea Store, constructed in 2005 at a cost of £12 million by William Verry to a design by David Adjaye, was nominated for the 2006 Stirling Prize.

Place	White British or Other White	Asian British	Black British	Other British
Whitechapel (22,000)	34.6%	51.3%	4.9%	9.1%
Tower Hamlets (334,000)	39.4%	44.4%	7.3%	8.9%

=== In literature ===
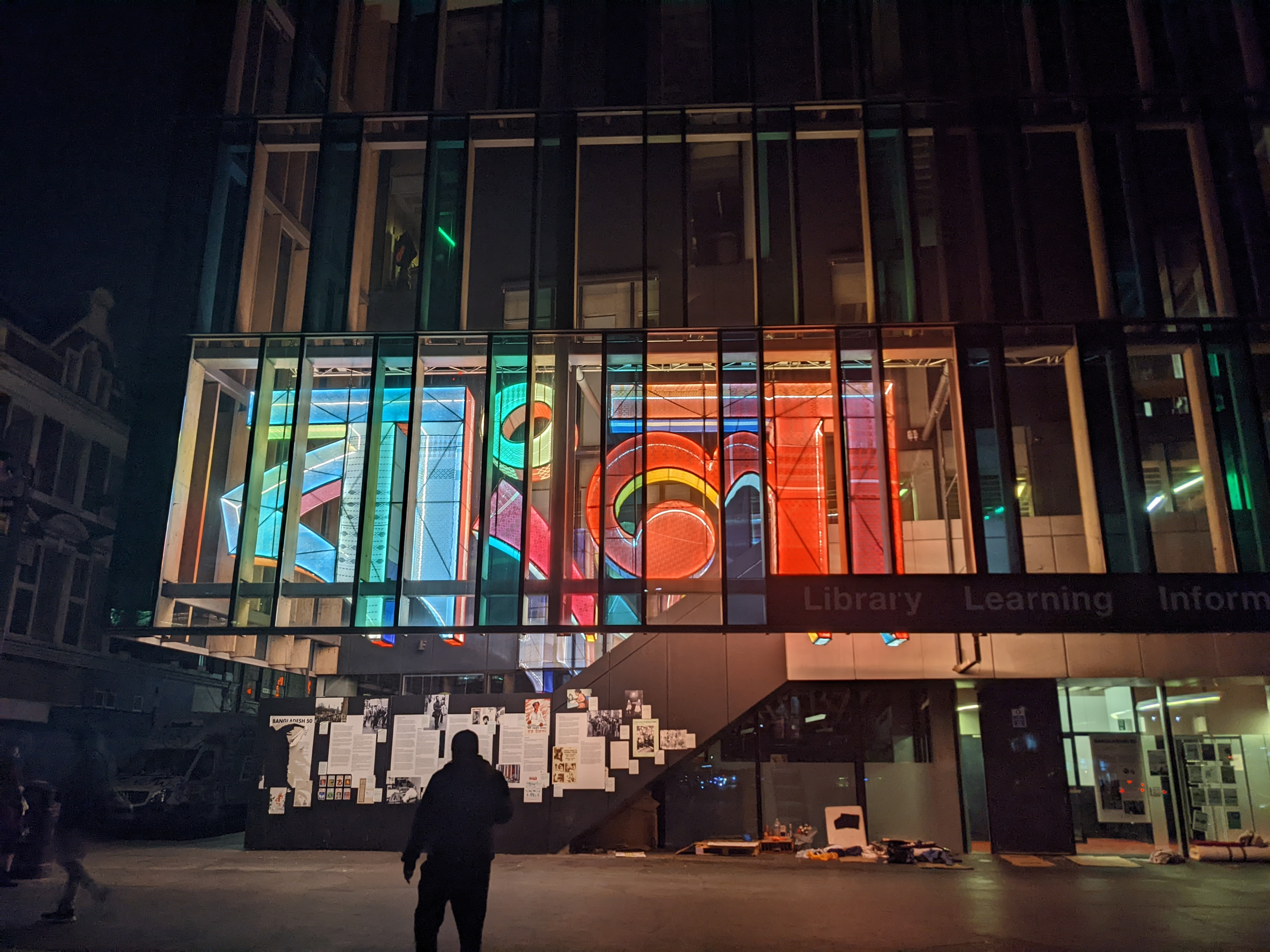
The Whitechapel Library with the word "বাংলা" illuminated in its front

Whitechapel features in Charles Dickens's Pickwick Papers (chapter 22) as the location of the Bull Inn, where the Pickwickians take a coach to Ipswich. En route, driving along Whitechapel Road, Sam Weller opines that it is "not a very nice neighbourhood" and notes the correlation between poverty and the abundance of oyster stalls here. One of Fagin's dens in Dickens's Oliver Twist was located in Whitechapel, and Fagin himself was possibly based on a notorious local 'fence' named Ikey Solomon (1785–1850).

Whitechapel is also the setting of several novels by Jewish authors such as Children of the Ghetto and The King of Schnorrers by Israel Zangwill and Jew Boy by Simon Blumenfeld. Several chapters of Sholem Aleichem's classic Yiddish novel Adventures of Mottel the Cantor's Son take place in early 20th-century Whitechapel, depicted from the point of view of an impoverished East European Jewish family fleeing the pogroms. The novel Journey Through a Small Planet by Emanuel Litvinoff vividly describes Whitechapel and its Jewish inhabitants in the 1920s and 1930s.

The prostitute and daughter of a Luddite leader Sybil Gerard, main character of William Gibson and Bruce Sterling's novel The Difference Engine comes from Whitechapel. The novel's plot begins there.

One of the episodes in Michael Moorcock's novel Breakfast in the Ruins takes place in 1905 Whitechapel, described from the point of view of an eleven year old Jewish refugee from Poland, working with his parents at a sweatshop, who is caught up in the deadly confrontation between Russian revolutionaries and agents of the Czar's Secret Police.

Brick Lane, the 2003 novel by Monica Ali is based in Whitechapel and documents the life of a young Bangladeshi woman's experience of living in Tower Hamlets in the 1990s and early 2000s.

Whitechapel is used as a location in most Jack the Ripper fiction. One such example is the bizarre White Chappel Scarlet Tracings (1987) by Iain Sinclair. It also features as the setting for the science fiction Webcomic FreakAngels, written by popular comics writer Warren Ellis.

Whitechapel is one of the worldwide locations referenced in Edith Piaf's song C'est à Hambourg , describing the harsh life of prostitutes.

In 2002, Whitechapel was used as the setting for a Sherlock Holmes film, The Case of the Whitechapel Vampire, based on the Arthur Conan Doyle story The Adventure of the Sussex Vampire.

Whitechapel serves as the setting for the television series Ripper Street, which aired 2013–2016.

=== In music ===
Whitechapel is the setting for the song "Fogwalking", a track on the 1970s album A Black Box, by English musical artist Peter Hammill.

The American death metal/deathcore band Whitechapel is named after the area, and many of their earlier albums reference the Whitechapel murders.

== Transport ==
=== Current railway stations ===
Whitechapel has two underground stations: Aldgate East and Whitechapel. Aldgate East is served by the District line and the Hammersmith & City. Whitechapel is also served by these lines, as well by the Elizabeth line and the London Overground Windrush line.

=== Historic railway stations ===
Whitechapel station was originally called Whitechapel (Mile End) to reflect its position just inside Whitechapel's boundary with Mile End and also its boundary with Bethnal Green.

Aldgate East station was originally 150 metres west of its current location and there was once an additional district line station immediately east of the modern East London Mosque called St Mary's (Whitechapel Road).

In the 1930s, Aldgate East station was relocated 150 metres east of its original position, meaning there would then be three stations in very close proximity; as a result, the railway economised by closing St Mary's, in the middle of the three stations.

=== Other modes ===
London Buses 15, 25, 106, 115, 135, 205, 254, D3, N15, N205, N253, N550 and N551 all operate within the area.

Whitechapel is connected to the National Road Network by both the A11 on Whitechapel Road in the centre and, to the south, the A13 and The Highway A1203 running east–west.

Cycle Superhighway CS2 runs from Aldgate to Stratford on the A11.

== Nearest places ==
Districts

- Aldgate
- Bethnal Green
- City of London
- East Smithfield
- Spitalfields
- Tower Hill
- Wapping
- Shadwell
- Stepney
- Mile End
- Mile End New Town

== Notable natives or residents ==
In addition to the prominent figures detailed in the article:

=== Born in Whitechapel ===
- Damon Albarn – musician, lead singer of Blur and co-creator of virtual cartoon rock band Gorillaz, born 1968
- Julius Stafford Baker, cartoonist
- Abraham Beame, first Jewish mayor of New York City, 1906–2001
- Jack Kid Berg, boxer, "The Whitechapel Windmill", British Lightweight Champion 1934
- Stanley Black, bandleader, 1913–2002.
- Simon Blumenfeld, novelist, playwright and columnist, 1907–2005.
- Georgia Brown (born Lillian Klot), actress and singer, 1933–1992
- Tina Charles, 1970s disco artist, born 1954
- Peter Cheyney, mystery writer and journalist, 1896–1951
- Jack Cohen, Anglo-Jewish businessman who founded the Tesco supermarket chain, 1898–1979
- Ashley Cole, Chelsea and England footballer 1980
- Jack "Spot" Comer, Jewish gangster and anti-Fascist, 1912–1996
- Roger Delgado, actor (known for playing "The Master" in Doctor Who), 1918–1973
- Lloyd Doyley, footballer
- Bud Flanagan (born Chaim Reuven Weintrop), music hall comedian on stage, radio, film and television, 1896–1968
- Micky Flanagan, comedian
- Kemal Izzet, footballer
- Muzzy Izzet, footballer
- Kenney Jones, drummer
- Morris Kestelman, artist
- Charlie Lee, Leyton Orient footballer
- Emanuel Litvinoff, Anglo-Jewish author of Journey Through a Small Planet
- Margaret Pepys (née Kite), mother of diarist Samuel Pepys, d. 1667
- Brendan Perry, founding member of music group Dead Can Dance
- Ella Purnell, actress
- Abe Saperstein, founder of the Harlem Globetrotters basketball team
- Barry Silkman (born 1952), footballer
- Sarah Taylor, cricketer
- Alan Tilvern, film and television actor, 1918–2003
- Anwar Uddin, captain of Dagenham and Redbridge
- Gary Webster, actor

=== Resident in or otherwise associated with Whitechapel ===
- Altab Ali, murdered in a Whitechapel park in 1978
- Barney Barnato, diamond mining industrialist and Randlord, 1851–1897
- Richard Brandon (? – 20 June 1649), the reputed executioner of King Charles I was buried at the Whitechapel parish church of St Mary Matfelon. The church register records that he lived in Rosemary Lane (modern Royal Mint Street).
- Mary Hughes (1860–1941), a voluntary parish worker who initially lived in the Blackwall Buildings before moving to a converted pub on Vallance Road where she offered food and shelter to the needy.
- Jack the Ripper, serial killer
- Charles Lahr (1885–1971), German-born anarchist, London bookseller and publisher, secretary of the Whitechapel branch of the Industrial Union of Direct Actionists (IUDA)
- Jack London, who wrote The People of the Abyss while staying in Whitechapel – an account of his 1902 stay amongst the East End poor
- Richard Parker, Royal Navy mutineer buried in St Mary Matfelon
- Rudolf Rocker, anarcho-syndicalist writer, historian and prominent activist, active in Whitechapel 1895–1918, 1873–1958
- Obadiah Shuttleworth, composer, violinist and organist of the parish church, d. 1734
- Avrom Stencl (1897–1983), Polish-born Yiddish poet, early companion of Franz Kafka, published Loshn and Lebn in Whitechapel

== Future developments ==
Whitechapel Market and the A11 corridor is currently the subject of a £20 million investment to improve the public spaces along the route. The London Boroughs of Tower Hamlets & Newham are working with English Heritage and Transport for London to refurbish the historic buildings at this location and improve the market.

== See also ==
- British Bangladeshi
- Stepney Historical Trust
- Whitechapel Mount
