= Journey Through a Small Planet =

1972 memoir by Emanuel Litvinoff

- First edition
- Author: Emanuel Litvinoff
- Language: English
- Genre: Memoir
- Publisher: Michael Joseph
- Publication date: 1972
- Publication place: United Kingdom
- Media type: Print (Paperback)
- Pages: 256 pp
- ISBN: 978-0-14-118930-7
- OCLC: 261924466

Journey Through a Small Planet is a memoir written by Emanuel Litvinoff.

== Synopsis ==
In Journey Through a Small Planet (1972), the writer Emanuel Litvinoff recalls his working-class Jewish childhood in the East End of London: a small cluster of streets right next to the city, but worlds apart in culture and spirit. With vivid intensity Litvinoff describes the overcrowded tenements of Brick Lane and Whitechapel, the smell of pickled herring and onion bread, the rattle of sewing machines and chatter in Yiddish. He also relates stories of his parents, who fled from Russia in 1914, his experiences at school and a brief flirtation with Communism. Unsentimental, vital and almost dream like, this is a masterly evocation of a long-vanished world.
