= Bournemouth School for Girls =

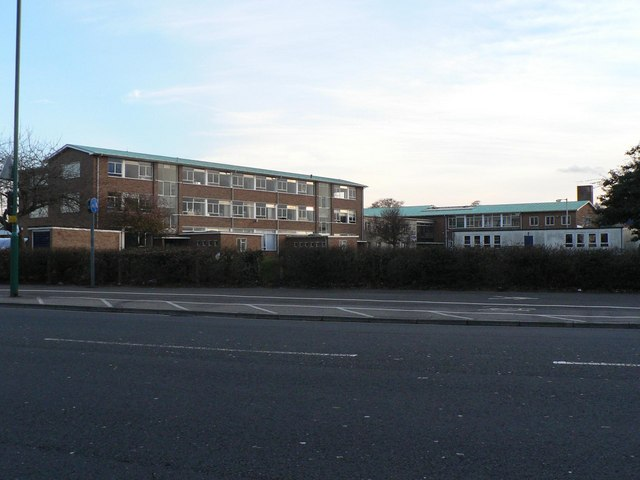

Location
- Castle Gate Close; Castle Lane West; Bournemouth, Dorset, BH8 9UJ; England; 50°45′00″N 1°51′10″W

Information
- Type: Grammar school Academy
- Motto: "Work hard Be kind Be ambitious"
- Established: 30 January 1918
- Local authority: Bournemouth, Christchurch and Poole
- Department for Education URN: 136996 Tables
- Ofsted: Reports
- Headmaster: David Sims
- Gender: Female
- Age: 11 to 18
- Enrolment: 1,200
- Houses: Austen (red); Curie (green); Franklin (blue); Parks (yellow); Rossetti (purple); Shelley (turquoise)
- Colours: Blue and white
- Website: www.wearebsg.uk

Bournemouth School for Girls is a grammar academy school in Bournemouth, Dorset, England. It is a girls' grammar school and sixth form college, teaching girls aged 11 to 18.

== History ==
The school opened with 160 pupils on 30 January 1918. It moved to new buildings in Castle Gate Close in 1961.

== Academics ==
Since September 2005, Bournemouth School for Girls has been a humanities specialist school. The school has approximately 1,200 students, including 300 in the sixth form. Until 2012, sixth form classes (including Theatre Studies, PE and Psychology) were open to Students at the boys-only Bournemouth School, with whom BSG share a sports and playing field.

== Productions ==
The school has a handbell team, who have played at the Royal Albert Hall. Every other year the school performs a musical which involves the whole school.

== Sport ==
In 2012, the school was selected by LloydsTSB to be a part of the National Olympic Torch Relay, in which 10 pupils carried an Olympic torch through Bournemouth.

=== CCF ===
The school has a Combined Cadet Force, a rarity for a state-funded school. The CCF has over 150 members from both Bournemouth School and Bournemouth School for Girls. The CCF is run by senior cadets and volunteer staff from both schools but hosted at Bournemouth School. The CCF is open to pupils in year 9 upwards with an annual recruitment usually in February. The CCF is split into three sections; Army, Navy and RAF, with each wearing rank-appropriate uniform.

== Ofsted ==
Bournemouth School for Girls has won praise from Inspectors following their visits, achieving 'Outstanding' in all aspects of school life in 2012. Inspectors noted 'the very good teaching and good leadership at all levels that enable pupils to achieve very well and develop into confident young adults.' They comment that 'staff are knowledgeable and supportive; they transfer their love of learning to the pupils and help them to achieve very well.'

Pupils at the school had 'their very high levels of determination to succeed' and 'exemplary behaviour'. The sixth form was described as ‘highly effective'. 'Provision is very good in academic subjects and for students' personal development.'

== Notable former pupils ==
- Lisa Dillon, actress
- Cherry Marshall (1923-2006), fashion model and agent, and non-fiction writer
- Tamaryn Payne, actress
- Pauline Rudd, Professor at University College Cork
- Sophie Rundle, actress
- Jennifer Worth, memoirist, nurse, midwife, musician. Her books were the source for the television series Call the Midwife.
- Lisa Lodwick, Archaeologist
