= Quaker Tapestry =

Embroidery depicting the history of Quakerism

Coordinates: 54.32849°N 2.74297°W

The Quaker Tapestry consists of 77 panels illustrating the history of Quakerism from the 17th century to the present day. The idea of Quaker Anne Wynn-Wilson, the tapestry found a long-term home at the Friends Meeting House at Kendal, Cumbria, England.

The design was heavily influenced by the Bayeux Tapestry, and includes similar design choices, including three horizontal divisions within panels, embroidered outlines for faces and hands, and solid infilling of clothing, which is embroidered in the Bayeux technique. The tapestry is worked in crewel embroidery using woollen yarns on a handwoven woollen background. In addition to using four historic and well-known stitches (split stitch, stem stitch, chain stitch and Peking knot), Wynn-Wilson invented a new corded stitch, known as Quaker stitch, to allow for tight curves on the lettering.

Each panel measures 25 inches (64 cm) wide by 21 inches (53 cm) tall.

4,000 men, women and children from 15 countries worked on the panels between 1981 and 1989.

Panels have been toured in traveling exhibitions including a North American tour in 1993/1994. An exhibition of 39 panels in Ely Cathedral in 2012 attracted 11,273 visitors during its 27-day stay.

In October 2021, the museum was one of 142 sites across England to receive part of a £35-million injection into the government's Culture Recovery Fund (a response to the COVID-19 pandemic). The museum received a "Hidden Gem" award for 2020-21 from VisitEngland.

The museum closed in December 2025.

== List of the panels ==
1. The Prism (Title Panel)
2. George Fox's convincement (A1)
3. James Nayler's call to ministry (A2)
4. James Parnell: Meetings for Sufferers (A3)
5. Richard Sellar (A4)
6. The good ship 'Woodhouse' (A5)
7. John Woolman (A6)
8. Conscientious objection (A7)
9. Manchester Conference 1895 (A8)
10. Oaths (A9)
11. George Fox travels to Sedbergh (B1)
12. Mary Fisher, Elizabeth Hooton (B2)
13. John Bright (B3)
14. Publishers of Truth (B4)
15. Stephen Grellet (B5)
16. Woodbrooke, Selly Oak, Birmingham (B6)
17. Service Overseas (B7)
18. Quaker Peace Action caravan (B8)
19. Swarthmoor Hall, Ulverston (C1)
20. Margaret Fell, Mother of Quakerism (C2)
21. Keep your meetings (C3)
22. Meeting houses (C4)
23. Meeting Houses overseas (C5)
24. Meeting Houses in the Community (C6)
25. Quaker schools (C7)
26. Marriage (C8)
27. Pilgrimages (C9)
28. Children and Young People (C10)
29. The Leaveners (C11)
30. George Fox at Lichfield, Pendle Hill (D1)
31. Quaker Simplicity (D2)
32. Personal Devotion (D3)
33. Coalbrookdale (D4)
34. Innocent Trades (D5)
35. Quaker merchants (D6)
36. Railways (D7)
37. Quaker Botanists (D8)
38. Quaker Doctors (D9)
39. Quaker Scientists (D10)
40. Industrial Welfare (D11)
41. Query 19 (D12)
42. Scott Bader Commonwealth (D13)
43. Fox at Ulverston (E1)
44. John Bellers (E2)
45. Banking (E3)
46. Criminal Justice (E4)
47. Elizabeth Fry (E5)
48. Elizabeth Fry and the Patchwork Quilts (E6)
49. First-day schools (E7)
50. The Great Hunger (E8)
51. Mary Hughes (E9)
52. Unemployment (E10)
53. Friends' Provident Institution (E11)
54. William Allen (E12)
55. Derby Gaol (F1)
56. Trial of Penn and Meade (F2)
57. Early Friends and slavery (F3)
58. Daniel Wheeler (F4)
59. Delegation to the Czar (F5)
60. Relief Work: British Isles (F6)
61. Relief of suffering (F7)
62. Friends' Ambulance Unit (F8)
63. Reconciliation (F9)
64. Underground Railway (F10)
65. William Penn and Pennsylvania (F11)
66. America and Milford Haven meeting (F12)
67. Quakers in Dolgellau (F13)
68. Quakerism in New Zealand (F14)
69. Workcamps (F15)
70. Building the institutions of Peace (F16)
71. Vigils for Peace (F17)
72. World Conference 1991 (F18)
73. Friends and the Boer War (F19)
74. Tasmania (F20)
75. Friends in Canada (F21)
76. The Netherlands 1940–1945 (F22)
77. World Family of Friends (Final Panel)
