= Emanuel Litvinoff =

British writer (1915–2011)

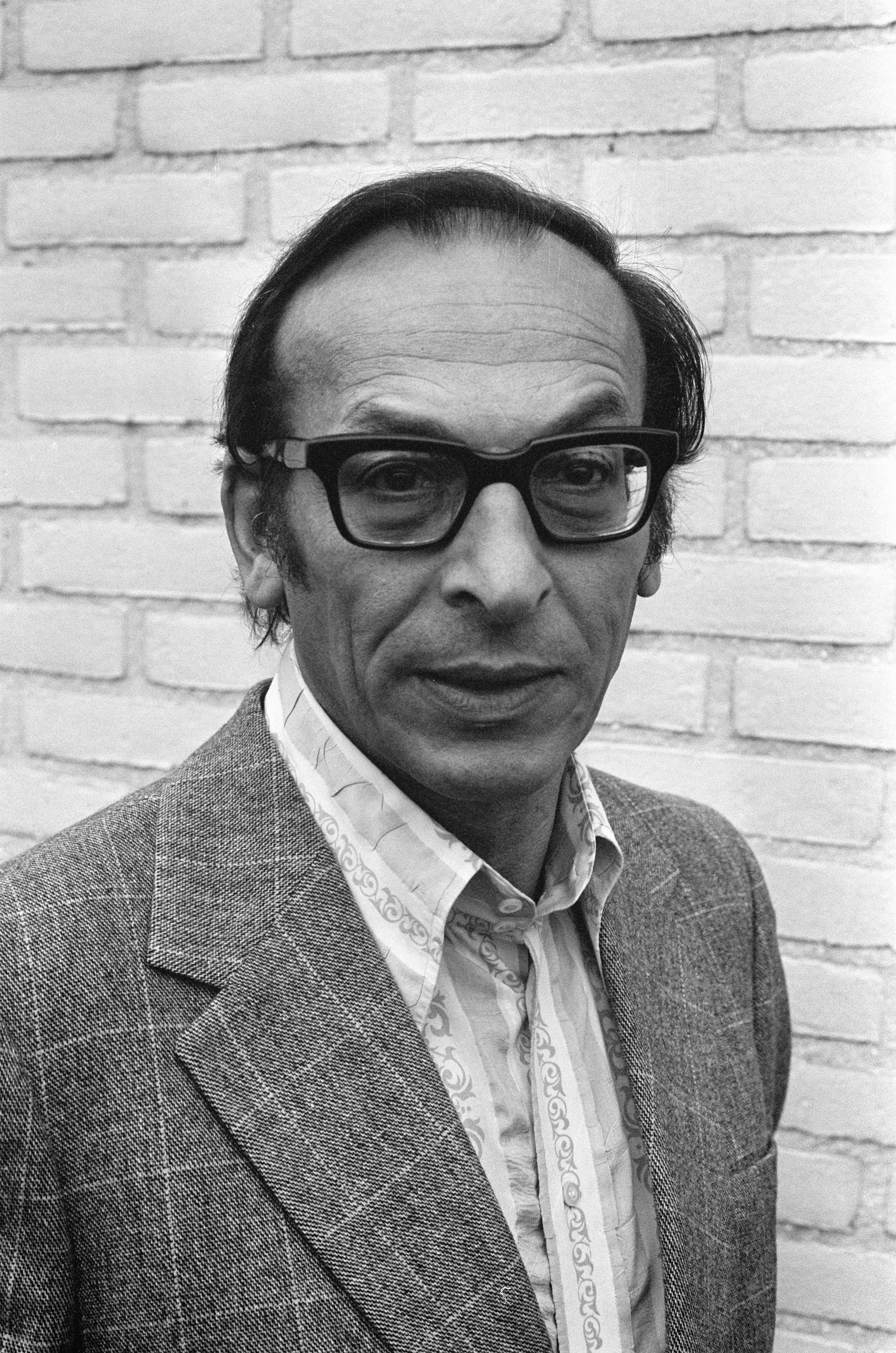
- Emanuel Litvinoff in 1973
- Born: 5 May 1915; Bethnal Green, London, England
- Died: 24 September 2011 (aged 96); Bloomsbury, London, England
- Occupation: Writer
- Known for: Autobiography, poetry, plays, human rights
- Spouses: Cherry Marshall (m. 1942; div. 1970); Mary McClory (m. 2006)
- Children: 4; Vida (d. 2010), Julian, Sarah, Aaron
- Website: http://www.emanuel-litvinoff.com

Emanuel Litvinoff (5 May 1915 – 24 September 2011) was a Jewish writer and well-known figure in Anglo-Jewish literature, known for novels, short stories, poetry, plays and human rights campaigning.

== Early years ==
Litvinoff's early years in what he frequently described as the Jewish ghetto in the East End of London made him very conscious of his Jewish identity, a subject he explored throughout his literary career. Litvinoff was born to Russian Jewish parents who emigrated from Odessa to Whitechapel, London, in 1915. His father was repatriated to Russia to fight for the czar and never returned: he is thought to have been killed in the Russian Revolution. Litvinoff was the second of nine children. One brother was the historian Barnet Litvinoff and one half-brother was David Litvinoff who was born to his mother Rosa's second husband Solomon Levy.

Litvinoff left school at 14 and, after working in a number of unskilled factory jobs, found himself homeless within a year. Drifting between Soho and Fitzrovia during the Depression of the 1930s, he wrote hallucinatory materials, since destroyed, and used his wits to survive.

Initially a conscientious objector, Litvinoff volunteered for military service in January 1940 on discovering the extent of the persecution suffered by Jews in Europe. He was commissioned into the Pioneer Corps in August 1942. Serving in Northern Ireland, West Africa and the Middle East, he rose through the ranks quickly, being promoted to major by the age of 27.

== Poems ==
Litvinoff became known as a war poet during his time in the Army. The anthology Poems from the Forces, published by Routledge in 1941, included some of his poems, as did the BBC radio feature of the same title. Conscripts: A Symphonic Declaration appeared in the same year, and his first collection, The Untried Soldier, followed in 1942. A Crown for Cain, published in 1948, included his poems from West Africa and Egypt. Over the years, he contributed poems to many anthologies and periodicals, including The Terrible Rain: War Poets 1939–1945 and Stand, a magazine edited by Jon Silkin. Litvinoff was a friend and mentor to many younger poets. His poems were collected in Notes for a Survivor (1973).

=== To T. S. Eliot ===
Litvinoff was one of the first to raise publicly the implications of T. S. Eliot's negative references to Jews in a number of his poems, in his own poem "To T. S. Eliot". Litvinoff, an admirer of Eliot, was appalled to find Eliot republishing lines he had written in the 1920s about "money in furs" and the "protozoic slime" of Bleistein's "lustreless, protrusive eye" only a few years after the Holocaust, in his Selected Poems of 1948. When Litvinoff got up to announce the poem at a poetry reading for the Institute of Contemporary Arts in 1951 the event's host, Sir Herbert Read, declared, "Oh Good, Tom's just come in," referring to Eliot. Despite feeling "nervous", Litvinoff decided that "the poem was entitled to be read" and proceeded to recite it to the packed but silent room:

So shall I say it is not eminence chills
but the snigger from behind the covers of history,
the sly words and the cold heart
and footprints made with blood upon a continent?
Let your words
tread lightly on this earth of Europe

lest my people’s bones protest.

In the pandemonium after Litvinoff read the poem Eliot reportedly stated, "It's a good poem, it's a very good poem."

=== Struma ===
Litvinoff is also known for his poem "Struma", written in response to the Struma disaster. Volunteering for military service in January 1940, Litvinoff saw his military officer as a straightforward matter of combating Nazi evil, but the sinking of the Struma in February 1942 complicated this. An old schooner with an unreliable second-hand engine, the Struma had left Romania in December 1941 crowded with nearly 800 Jewish refugees escaping the Nazis. After engine failure on the Black Sea she was towed into Istanbul harbour. Her passengers hoped to travel overland to Palestine, but Turkey forbade them to disembark unless Britain allowed them to settle in Palestine. As the refugees were attempting to illegally emigrate to Palestine in violation of the White Paper of 1939, the British refused; after weeks of deadlock Turkish authorities towed Struma back into the Black Sea and set her adrift. She sank on the next day, killing all but one of the 792 crew and passengers aboard. It emerged years later that the Struma had been torpedoed by a Soviet Navy submarine, but Litvinoff believed that the British were ultimately responsible. The disaster "blurred the frontiers of evil" for him and left Litvinoff reluctant to describe himself as "English" or to seek the kind of assimilation achieved by other Jewish writers in Britain.

The poem contains the lines:

Today my khaki is a badge of shame,
Its duty meaningless; my name
Is Moses and I summon plague to Pharaoh.
Today my mantle is Sorrow and O
My crown is Thorn. I sit darkly with the years

And centuries of years, bowed by my heritage of tears.

== Novels ==
After the war Litvinoff briefly worked as a ghostwriter for Louis Golding, writing most or all of The Bareknuckle Breed and To the Quayside, before going on to write his own novels. Litvinoff's novels explore the issue of Jewish identity across decades and in a variety of geographical contexts; Britain, Germany, the Soviet Union and Israel.

=== The Lost Europeans ===
Ten years after the war Litvinoff went to live in Berlin. He described it as "a strangely exhilarating experience, like being under fire". The Lost Europeans (1960) was Litvinoff's first novel and was born out of this experience. Set in post-war Berlin, it follows the return of two Jews to Berlin after the Holocaust. One returns for both symbolic and material restitution, the other for revenge on the man who betrayed him.

=== The Man Next Door ===
The Man Next Door (1968), described by The New York Times as "the British answer to Portnoy's Complaint", tackles British suburban anti-Semitism. Set in the fictional Home Counties town of Maidenford, it features a despondent middle-aged vacuum cleaner salesman who sees his new neighbours, wealthy self-made Jews, as the root of his problems and wages an escalating campaign of hatred against them.

=== Journey Through A Small Planet ===
Litvinoff's best-known work is probably Journey Through a Small Planet (1972), in which he chronicled his working-class Jewish childhood and early adult years in the East End, a small cluster of streets that was right next to the City of London, but had more in common with the cities of Kiev, Kharkov and Odessa. Litvinoff describes the overcrowded tenements of Brick Lane and Whitechapel, the smells of pickled herring and onion bread, the rattle of sewing machines, and chatter in Yiddish. He also relates stories of his parents, who fled from Russia in 1914, his experiences at school and a brief flirtation with Communism.

=== The Faces of Terror Trilogy ===
The trilogy Faces of Terror follows a pair of young revolutionaries from the streets of the East End and their political passage over the years to Stalinist Russia. The first novel, A Death Out of Season (1973), is set around the Siege of Sidney Street and the fermenting anarchism of East London. The novel describes youth seduced by revolution through the characters Peter the Painter and Lydia Alexandrova, a young aristocrat who rebels against her class. Blood on the Snow (1975), the sequel, finds Lydia and Peter now committed Bolsheviks, in the chaos of famine and civil war in the aftermath of the Russian Revolution. The final instalment of the trilogy, The Face of Terror (1978), is set under the regime of Stalin, where revolution has turned into repression, and the ideals of freedom that Peter and Lydia once had have crumbled under the weight of guilt and disillusion.

=== Falls the Shadow ===
Falls the Shadow (1983) was a controversial novel, written because Litvinoff had become concerned at how he considered Israel to be invoking the memory of the Holocaust to justify its own outrages. Its narrative concerns an apparently distinguished and benign Israeli citizen who is assassinated in the street, then found to have been a concentration camp officer who had escaped using the identity of one of his victims.

== Plays ==
During the 1960s and 1970s Litvinoff wrote plays prolifically for television, in particular Armchair Theatre. His play The World in a Room tackled the subject of interracial marriage.

== Campaign for Soviet Jewry ==
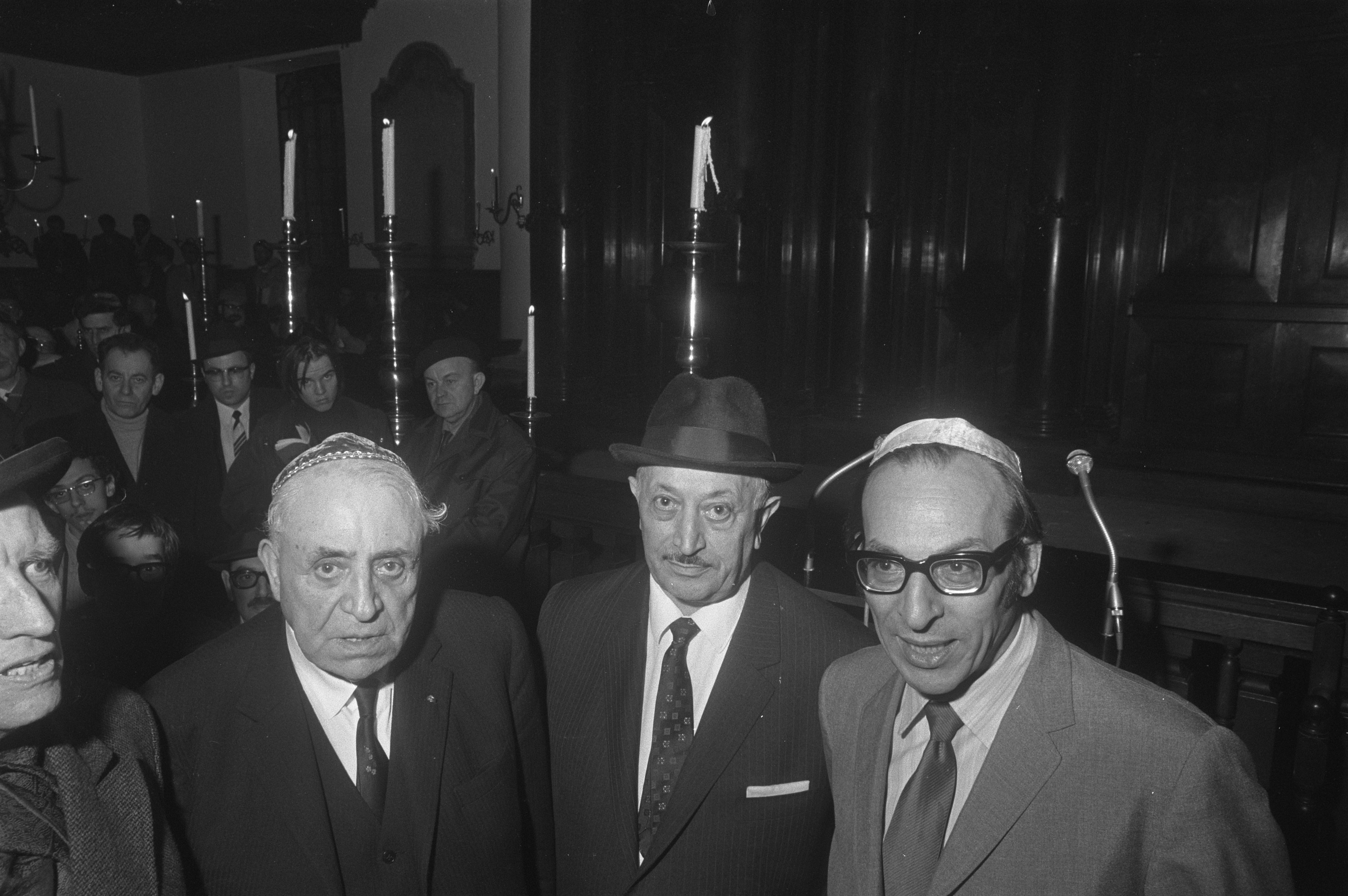
Emanuel Litvinoff (right) alongside "Nazi Hunter" Simon Wiesenthal (centre) and British MP Barnett Janner (left) at meeting in solidarity with Jews in Russia, Amsterdam, 1970

Although he was a successful poet, novelist and screenwriter, the majority of Litvinoff's career was spent spearheading a worldwide campaign for the liberation of Soviet Jewry. In the 1950s, on a visit to Russia with his first wife, Cherry Marshall, and her fashion show, Litvinoff became aware of the plight of persecuted Soviet Jews, and started a worldwide campaign against this persecution. One of his methods was editing the newsletter Jews in Eastern Europe and also lobbying eminent figures of the twentieth century such as Bertrand Russell, Jean-Paul Sartre, and others to join the campaign. Due to Litvinoff's efforts, prominent Jewish groups in the United States became aware of the issue, and the well-being of Soviet Jews became cause for a worldwide campaign, eventually leading to the mass migration of Jews from the Soviet Union to Israel and the United States. For this he has been described by Meir Rosenne, a former Israeli ambassador to the United States, as "one of the greatest unsung heroes of the twentieth century... who won in the fight against an evil empire" and that "thousands and thousands of Russian Jews owe him their freedom".

== Personal life ==
In 1942, he met Cherry Marshall at a Catterick Camp dance and they married at a register office a few months later. They had three children together but divorced in 1970. He had one child by his second wife, Mary McClory.

== Bibliography ==
=== Poetry ===
- Conscripts (1941)
- The Untried Soldier (1942)
- A Crown for Cain (1948)
- Notes for a Survivor (1973)

=== Prose ===
- The Lost Europeans (1960)
- The Man Next Door (1968)
- Journey Through a Small Planet (1972)
- A Death Out of Season (1973)
- Blood on the Snow (1975)
- The Face of Terror (1978)
- Falls the Shadow (1983)

=== Edited collections ===
- Soviet Anti-Semitism: The Paris Trial (1974)
- The Penguin Book of Jewish Short Stories (1979)

== Sources ==
Interviews

- Interview with Emanuel Litvinoff, 25 Jun 2011";
- Burman, Hannah. "Emanuel Litvinoff: Full Interview". London's Voices: Voices Online. Museum of London. Conducted on 11 March 1998. Retrieved 7 July 2008. (Summary and transcript of the interview, covering Litvinoff's life up to the 1950s.)
- "The Roots of Writing: With Bernard Kops, Emanuel Litvinoff, Harold Pinter, Arnold Wesker; Chair: Melvyn Bragg: Gala Festival Opening Event, In association with the Jewish Quarterly". 2003 Jewish Book Week. jewishbookweek.com (Archive), 1 March 2003. Retrieved 7 July 2008. (Session transcript and recorded audio clip.)
