= Pauline Rudd =

British biochemist

Pauline Rudd FRSM
- Born: Pauline Mary Rudd
- Education: Bournemouth School for Girls
- Alma mater: Westfield College (BSc); Open University (PhD)
- Scientific career
- Fields: Glycobiology
- Institutions: University College Dublin; University College Cork; University of Oxford; Scripps Research; Ben-Gurion University of the Negev; Wessex Biochmeicals
- Thesis: The structure and function of glycoforms (1995)
- Doctoral advisor: Peter Taylor
- Website: apc.ucc.ie/pauline-rudd/

Pauline Rudd FRSM is a British biochemist and Professor at the Microbiome Institute, University College Cork. She is a founder of Wessex Biochemicals, a Fellow of the Royal Society of Medicine and was awarded the James Gregory Medal in 2010.

== Early life and education ==
Rudd grew up in Bournemouth and attended Bournemouth School for Girls. As a child she wanted to be a physicist. Her uncle was a physicist, and Rudd joined the British Junior Astronomical Association. She was the only girl in a group of 48 boys, and said she was never allowed to look down the telescope. The male dominated environment of physics made Rudd consider a career in chemistry instead. When she was fourteen, she started to use washing machines and liquidisers to create rare sugars and sugar phosphates. She sold these chemicals through and co-founded Wessex Biochemicals. Rudd was an undergraduate chemistry student at Westfield College, then part of the University of London. After earning her degree, she joined Wessex Biochemicals which employed thirty people before being acquired by Sigma-Aldrich. She completed her PhD in 1995 which was awarded by the Open University.

== Research and career ==
Rudd joined the glycobiology institute at the University of Oxford in 1985. At the time, it was difficult for women scientists to secure jobs as academic personnel, and Rudd joined as a glass washer. She learned how to work with glycoproteins and large sugars and eventually completed a doctorate on glycoforms at the Open University in 1995. Rudd moved to the Scripps Research institute, and held a visiting position at the Ben-Gurion University of the Negev. She commercialised her work on liquid chromatography–mass spectrometry (LCMS) with Waters Corporation.

Rudd has worked to miniaturise technologies for glycol analysis. For example, she has used genome-wide association studies (GWAS) to link individual genomes to their serum glycome and individual proteins. She moved to University College Dublin in 2006, where was made head of the Dublin-Oxford glycobiology laboratory research group. She opened the National Institute for Bioprocessing Research and Training (NIBRT), where she developed new processes for protein glycosylation in an attempt to characterise recombinant protein drugs.

=== Awards and honours ===
- Elected a Fellow of the Royal Society of Medicine (FRSM)
- Awarded Fellowship of the International Society for Science and Religion
- 2010 James Gregory Medal
- 2010 Agilent Thought Leader Award
- 2012 Waters Corporation Center of Innovation Program Honors
- 2014 University of Gothenburg Sahlgrenska institute Honorary Doctorate
- 2016 The Analytical Scientist Power List
- 2017 International glycoconjugate organisation award

=== Selected publications ===
- Rudd PM; Elliott T; Cresswell P; Wilson IA; Dwek RA (1 March 2001). "Glycosylation and the immune system". Science. 291 (5512): 2370–2376. doi:10.1126/SCIENCE.291.5512.2370. ISSN 0036-8075. PMID 11269318. Wikidata Q34195578.
- James N Arnold; Mark R Wormald; Robert B. Sim; Pauline M Rudd; Raymond A Dwek (1 January 2007). "The impact of glycosylation on the biological function and structure of human immunoglobulins". Annual Review of Immunology. 25: 21–50. doi:10.1146/ANNUREV.IMMUNOL.25.022106.141702. ISSN 0732-0582. PMID 17029568. Wikidata Q36618276.
- P. Van den Steen; P. M. Rudd; R. A. Dwek; G. Opdenakker (1 January 1998). "Concepts and principles of O-linked glycosylation". Critical Reviews in Biochemistry and Molecular Biology. 33 (3): 151–208. doi:10.1080/10409239891204198. ISSN 1040-9238. PMID 9673446. Wikidata Q34749639.

== Personal life ==
Rudd serves as an associate of the Anglican Church at the Community of St Mary the Virgin in Wantage, Oxfordshire. She took a fifteen-year career break to raise her four children.
