= Stretford End =

Stand at Old Trafford

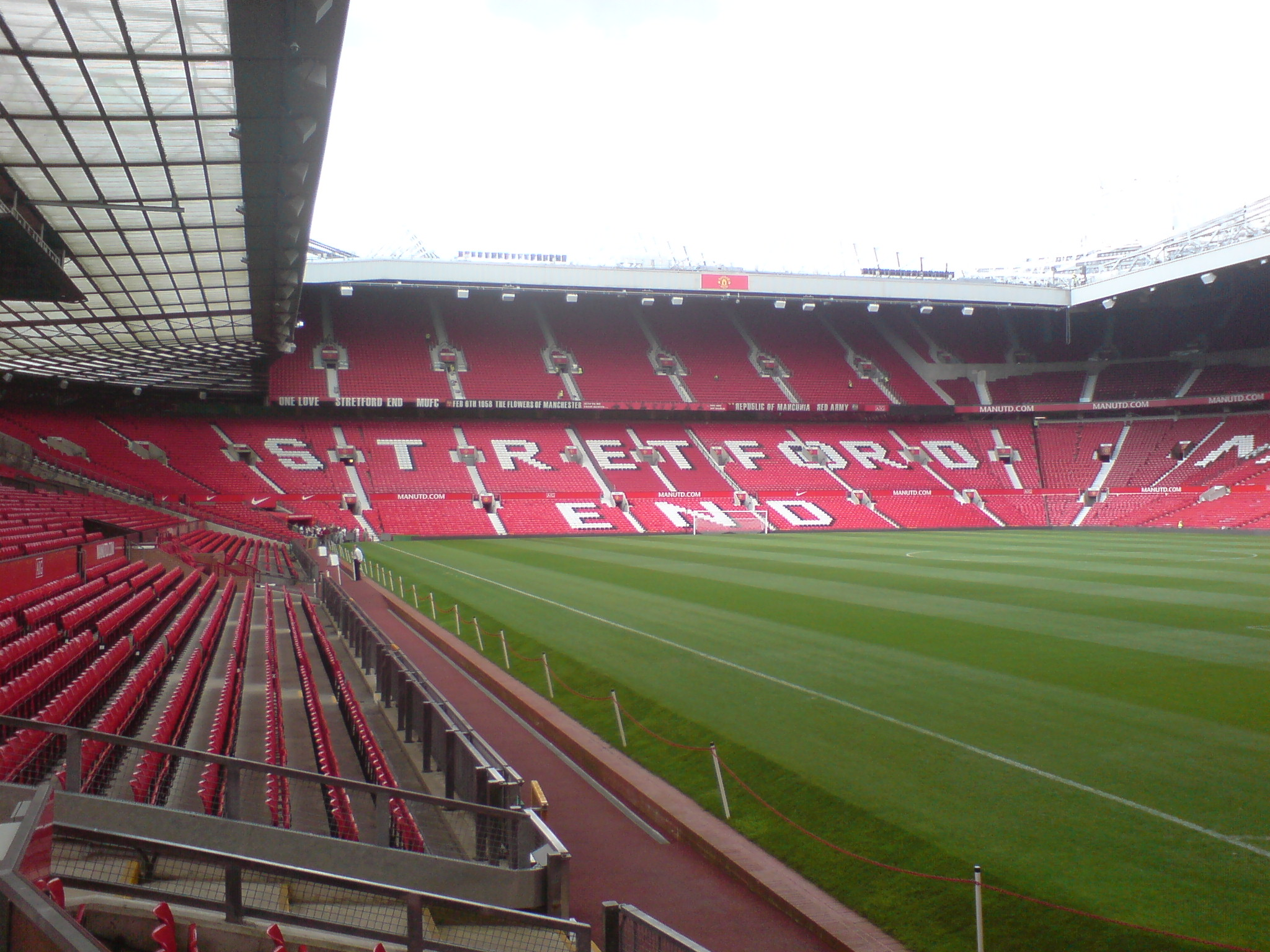
The Stretford End, taken from the South-East corner of the ground

The Stretford End, also known as the West Stand, is at Old Trafford, the stadium of Manchester United. It takes its name from nearby Stretford. The stand is divided into two tiers and, in common with the rest of the stadium, has a cantilever roof.

== History ==
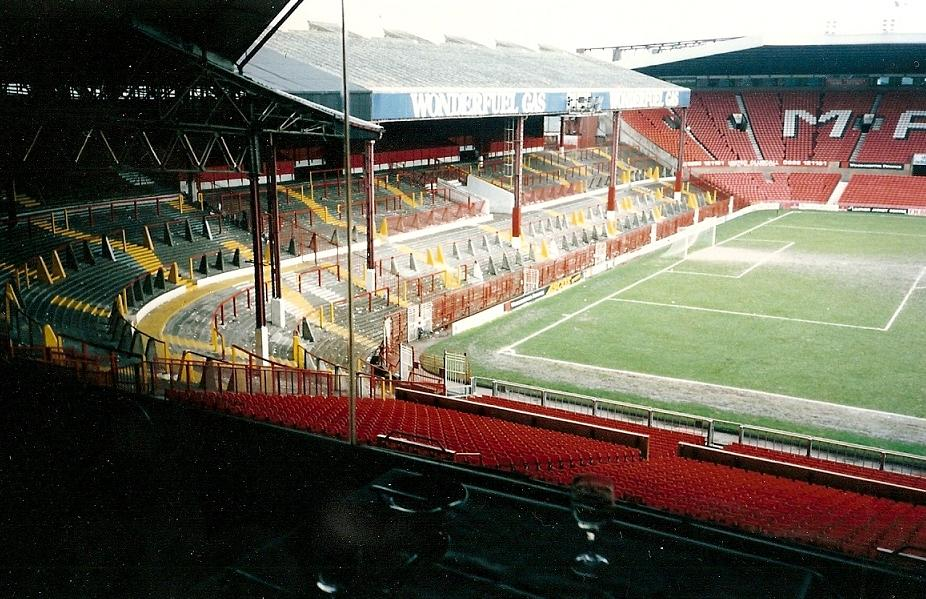
The Stretford End terraces before 1993.

Before the Taylor Report, which required all Premier League and Division One clubs to have all-seater stadia by the start of the 1994–95 season, the Stretford End was the main standing area at Old Trafford, accommodating around 20,000 fans. The very upper tier of the end did actually have form seating where generally families with younger children used to sit. The last game played in front of the terrace was the final match of the 1991–92 season, a 3–1 win over Tottenham Hotspur on 2 May 1992.

The terrace was demolished in the 1992 close-season and replaced with a £10 million all-seater cantilever stand by the end of the 1992–93 season, and its name officially changed to the West Stand, although it is still often referred to as the Stretford End and has white seats spelling the name out. The construction work was carried out by Birse Group.

The redevelopment of the Stretford End was already being planned by 1989, when chairman Martin Edwards was proposing to sell the club and was willing to sell his shares for £10 million and pledge £10 million to any new owner for the redevelopment of the Stretford End; however, the proposed sale of the club to Michael Knighton fell through and Edwards remained the club's owner for another 16 years.

For the 2000–01 season, a second tier of seating was added. As well as hosting a number of executive boxes, the first tier of the West Stand is now partly occupied by The Red Army, a fan led group dedicated to restoring the stand’s atmosphere. The players' tunnel is located at the corner of the Stretford End and the Sir Bobby Charlton (South) stand.

Strikers Denis Law (who played for United from 1962 to 1973) and Eric Cantona (1992 to 1997) were nicknamed "King of the Stretford End" by the club's fans, the former for his prolific scoring and the latter for his charisma as well as his contribution towards the club's success in the nineties.

== Statue ==
The Stretford End has a statue of Denis Law on the upper concourse, which was unveiled on 23 September 2002. Law was known as the "King of the Stretford End" as he was idolised by the End's faithful.
