= Louis Golding =

English writer (1895–1958)

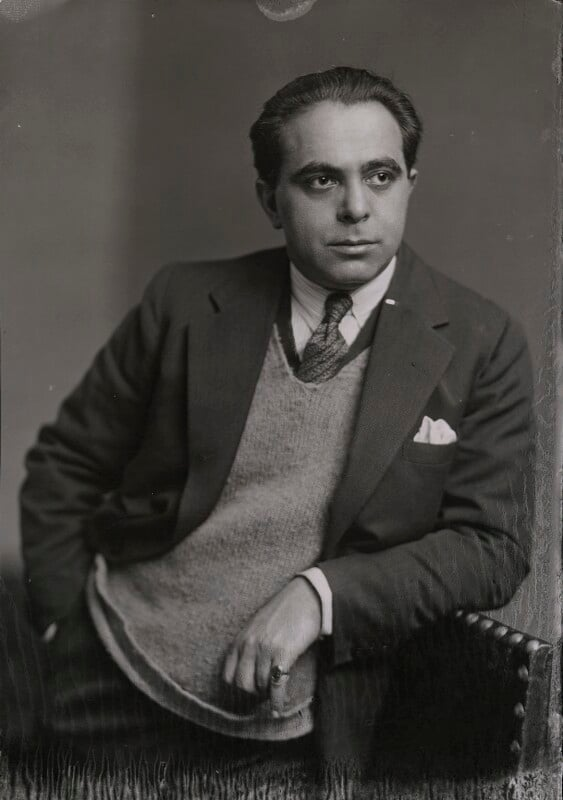
- Golding in 1954
- Born: 19 November 1895; Manchester, England
- Died: 9 August 1958 (aged 62); London, England
- Education: The Queen's College, Oxford
- Occupation: Writer

Louis Golding (19 November 1895 – 9 August 1958) was an English writer, famous in his time especially for his novels, though he is now largely neglected; he wrote also short stories, essays, fantasies, travel books, and poetry.

== Life ==
Born in Manchester, Lancashire into a Ukrainian-Jewish family, Golding was educated at Manchester Grammar School and Queen's College, Oxford. He used his Manchester background (as 'Doomington') and Jewish themes in his novels, the first of which was published while he was still an undergraduate (his student time was interrupted by service in World War I). Golding described Edgar Allan Poe and Alfred, Lord Tennyson as influences on his poetry.

His novel Magnolia Street was a bestseller of 1932; it is based on the Hightown area of Manchester, as it was in the 1920s. It features, authentically enough, a street divided into 'gentile' and 'Jewish' sides. It was a 1939 play for Charles B. Cochran in an adaptation by Golding and A. E. Rawlinson, and was also filmed as Magnolia Street Story. Magnolia Street was also dramatised by Allan Prior as a BBC Television series of the same name in 1961, which ran for 6 episodes.

Golding described his politics as "strongly to the left". In 1932, the Hogarth Press published Golding's A Letter to Adolf Hitler, an attack on anti-Semitism and Nazism. In 1940, Golding also criticized the Soviet Invasion of Finland.

Boucher and McComas named Honey for the Ghost the best supernatural novel of 1949, saying it "begins with infinite leisure but builds to an incomparable climactic terror."

Film screenplays on which Golding collaborated included that of the Paul Robeson film The Proud Valley (1940); this work with Robeson may have led to his later visa problems with the U.S. authorities. He also was involved in the script of the 1944 film of his novel Mr. Emmanuel.

Golding employed Gillian Freeman as a literary secretary. Freeman later became a novelist and screenwriter, often using her time with Golding as inspiration for her work.

He died from carcinoma of the pancreas at St George's Hospital, London, three weeks after an operation.

== Works ==
- Sorrow of War (1919) poems
- Forward from Babylon (1920) novel
- Shepherd Singing Ragtime: and other poems (1921)
- Prophet and Fool (1923) poems
- Seacoast Of Bohemia (1923)
- Sunward (1924) travel
- Sicilian Noon (1925) travel
- Day of Atonement (1925) novel
- Luigi of Catanzaro (1926)
- The Miracle Boy (1927) novel
- Store of Ladies (1927)
- Those Ancient Lands Being a Journey to Palestine (1928) travel
- The Prince or Somebody (1929)
- Adventures in Living Dangerously (1930)
- Give up Your Lovers (1930)
- Magnolia Street (1932) novel
- A letter to Adolf Hitler (1932)
- James Joyce (1933) criticism

Poems Drunk and Drowsy (1933) published by the Centaur Press

- The Doomington Wanderer (1934) stories
- Five Silver Daughters (1934) Tales of the Silver Sisters (1)
- The Camberwell Beauty (1935) novel
- The Pursuer (1936) novel
- In the Steps of Moses the Lawgiver [1937]
- The Jewish Problem (1938) non-fiction
- Mr. Emmanuel (1939) Tales of the Silver Sisters (2)
- Hitler through the Ages (1939) non-fiction
- The World I Knew (1940) non-fiction
- We Shall Eat and Drink Again (1944) with André Simon, essays on food and drink
- The Vicar of Dunkerly Briggs (1944) novel
- Who's There Within? (1944) novel
- The Call of the Hand: And Other Stories (1944) stories
- Pale Blue Nightgown: A Book of Tales (1944) stories
- No News from Helen (1945) novel
- The Glory of Elsie Silver (1945) Tales of the Silver Sisters (3)
- The Dance Goes On (1947) novel
- Bareknuckle Lover; and Other Stories (1947)
- Three Jolly Gentlemen (1949) novel
- Honey for the Ghost (1949) novel
- The Dangerous Places (1951) Tales of the Silver Sisters (4)
- To the Quayside (1954) (Ghostwritten by Emanuel Litvinoff)
- The Bareknuckle Breed (1952)(Ghostwritten by Emanuel Litvinoff), published by Hutchinson & Co Ltd
- The Loving Brothers (1953) novel
- The Little Old Admiral (1958)
- The Frightening Talent (1973) novel
