= Tower Hamlets Town Hall =

Municipal building in London, England

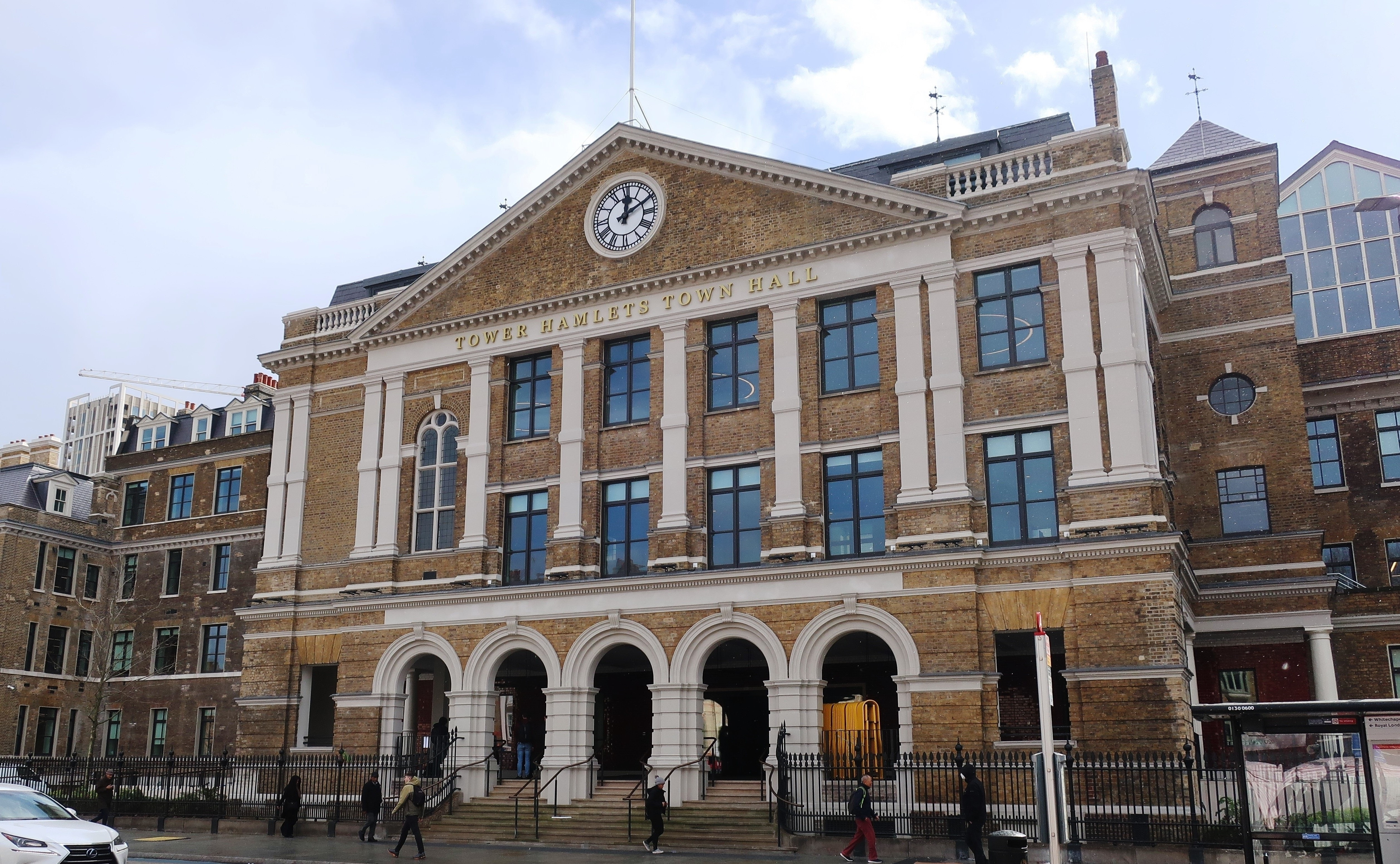
- Frontage of the Town Hall, 2023

- Shown in Tower Hamlets
- 51.5186°N 0.0601°W
- Location: 160 Whitechapel Road, London E1 1BJ

History
- Built: 1757 (façade)

Site notes
- Architect(s): Boulton Mainwaring (façade); Allford Hall Monaghan Morris (conversion)
- Architectural style: Neoclassical style

Listed Building – Grade II
- Official name: The London Hospital
- Designated: 21 September 1973
- Reference no.: 1065788

Tower Hamlets Town Hall is a municipal facility on Whitechapel Road, Whitechapel, London. The new structure, which has been commissioned as the headquarters of Tower Hamlets London Borough Council, incorporates the façade of the old Royal London Hospital which is a Grade II listed building.

== History ==
The original hospital was designed by Boulton Mainwaring in the neoclassical style, built in yellow brick and opened in September 1757. The design involved a symmetrical main frontage with seven bays facing onto Whitechapel Road; the central section of five bays featured an arcade of round headed windows on the ground floor, a mullioned window with tracery spanning the first and second floors in the left hand bay and sash windows on the first and the second floors in the other four bays. The windows were flanked by full-height Doric order pilasters supporting an entablature and a pediment with a clock in the tympanum. The Barts Health NHS Trust, who operated the hospital, vacated the old hospital building when it completed its relocation to modern facilities to the south of the old hospital in spring 2016.

In February 2015 Tower Hamlets London Borough Council acquired the old hospital for £9 million and announced plans to convert it into a new "civic centre" to which it would relocate from its existing premises at Mulberry Place. The project was intended to bring wider regeneration benefits to the Tower Hamlets area. Planning consent for the conversion was given in March 2018.

The construction required to deliver the conversion commenced in February 2019. The work was undertaken by Bouygues at a cost of £109.5 million to a design by Allford Hall Monaghan Morris. The design involved the retention of the listed facade and the construction of three new buildings behind the facade arranged around a new public square. The new building opened on 1 March 2023. It won the 2025 RIBA London Building of the Year.
