= Cherry Marshall =

English fashion model, agent and writer

- Marshall modelling for Susan Small
- Born: Irene Maud Pearson; 25 July 1923; Christchurch, Dorset, England
- Died: 28 January 2006 (aged 82); Frinton-on-Sea, Essex, England
- Education: Bournemouth School for Girls
- Occupations: Fashion model; agent; non-fiction writer
- Spouse: Emanuel Litvinoff (m. 1942; div. 1970)
- Children: 3

Cherry Marshall (25 July 1923 – 28 January 2006) was an English fashion model and agent, and non-fiction writer. She was married to the poet Emanuel Litvinoff.

== Early life ==
Marshall was born Irene Maud Pearson on 25 July 1923, at Girlsta Cottage, Jumpers Avenue, Christchurch, Dorset, the only daughter of Ernest Pearson, a sergeant in the Royal Engineers, and his wife, Catherine Margaret Pearson, née Baker, a photographer's assistant. She was educated at Bournemouth School for Girls.

In 1942, at the age of 19, she met Emanuel Litvinoff at a Catterick Camp dance and they married at a register office a few months later. They had three children together but divorced in 1970.

== Career ==
At the age of 15, she left school to become the singer with a dance band, but could not remember the lyrics. She then worked in a factory, then sat the civil service exams and went to work as a pay clerk at Chatham Dockyard. With the start of the Second World War and the risk of bombing, she moved to Nottingham, where her father was stationed.

In 1941, she worked as a fashion model for the first time, until at the age of 18 she joined the Auxiliary Territorial Service as a dispatch rider and driver.

She came up with the name Cherry Marshall based on "Cherry", her husband's nickname for her, and "Marshall" after the Marshall Plan. She did modelling for department stores, Vogue magazine, and became the house model for Susan Small, the ready-to-wear clothing company, through which she became known as "Miss Susan Small" in the early 1950s. Despite giving birth to three children she maintained her 22-inch waist and at one time held the record for London's smallest waist.

Marshall became bored with modelling, and changed career to become Susan Small's public relations manager. In 1954 she changed again, buying a modelling school and agency in London's Jermyn Street through which she became one of the most important modelling agents in London in the early 1960s. She moved to 65 Grosvenor Street, Mayfair W1 in the mid 1960s. Early on at the agency was a chance aberration of decision; a model placed on her books was Ruth Ellis, ultimately in 1955 for killing a lover, to be the last woman receiving death as punishment in Britain. The business became the Cherry Marshall Model Agency, and clients included Patti Boyd, Suzy Kendall, Anthea Redfern, Paulene Stone and Pat Booth.

She also worked as a fashion journalist, firstly at the Sunday Express. She ran the agency until 1976, whilst also appearing as a regular participant in Southern Television's Houseparty.

== Publications ==
In 1956, she published Fashion Modelling as a Career. In 1978, her memoir The Cat-Walk came out, followed by Primetime Woman in 1986.

== Later life ==
In the 1990s, Marshall bought a house in Frinton-on-Sea, Essex, and died there on 28 January 2006.
