= Birse Group =

British construction company

- Type: Private
- Industry: Construction and civil engineering
- Founded: 1970
- Founder: Peter Birse
- Defunct: 2014
- Headquarters: Tadcaster, England
- Area served: United Kingdom
- Products: Construction projects
- Number of employees: 786
- Parent: Balfour Beatty
- Website: www.birsecl.co.uk

Birse Group was a construction and civil engineering company based in North Yorkshire, England. It was acquired by Balfour Beatty in 2006 who retired the brand in 2014.

== History ==
The company was founded by Peter Birse as the Birse Group in Doncaster in 1970. It was floated on the stock market during 1989; one of the results of which being that the German civil engineering company Bilfinger Berger acquired a 15% shareholding in the firm. Peter Birse also held a considerable personal stake (at one point amounting to 14.1%) in the business, which he largely retained through to the 21st century.

Birse Group routinely worked with various state-owned bodies. In 1990, it was awarded a contract to extend HM Prison Leeds, as was a separate arrangement with the Property Services Agency valued at £3 million; the company also commenced construction of the Leighton Linsdale Bypass on behalf of Bedfordshire County Council under a £22 million project. By the end of that year, an almost 50 per cent rise in pre-tax profits was anticipated for 1990–91.

The company would often enter into consortiums for some of its undertakings, such as with Purac to fulfil a £14.7 million design and build contract for a new water treatment plant for Yorkshire Water. Road construction was a key area for the company during the early 1990s; however, despite being awarded multiple such contracts valued in the tens of millions that year, 1993 was a fiscally unsatisfactory year for Birse Group.

During 1996, Birse Rail was set up as a subsidiary of Birse Group for the purpose of providing high quality construction services to Britain's recently privatised railways. It worked with the national rail infrastructure company Network Rail, as well as other organisation active in the railway sector, on various civil engineering works, including one-off tendered design and build projects (for new stations and depot refurbishments), as well as longer term schemes delivered through long term framework contracts and the delivery of complex route works.

In mid-1996, the company recorded a profit of £1.12 million, the first such profit returned in five years. During July 1999, it was announced that Peter Birse would step aside from the day-to-day operations of the company.

Birse Group operated an off-the-shelf service for larger buildings; while initially targeted at football stadiums, this service was expanded to cover both business and retail units during 2002. That same year, the company took a £5.5 million write-off on a £27.5 million project to build Walkers Stadium for Leicester City F.C. after the latter declared bankruptcy.

During February 2002, following a dispute over payment, rival construction company Bovis took over a £21 million contract for Citibank that had previously been awarded to Birse Group. That same year, the company's construction arm was viewed as having underperformed.

Birse announced that it planned to reduce the size of building division due to persistent losses totaling £30m over the previous five-year period. In December 2005, the company recorded a £10 million loss.

During June 2006, Birse Group was acquired by rival construction company Balfour Beatty in exchange for £32 million. Less than a year after the acquisition, Peter Birse stood down from his roles with the company amid a boardroom reshuffle. Initially operated as a subsidiary, Birse Group was fully integrated into Balfour Beatty and all use of the brand ceased in January 2014.

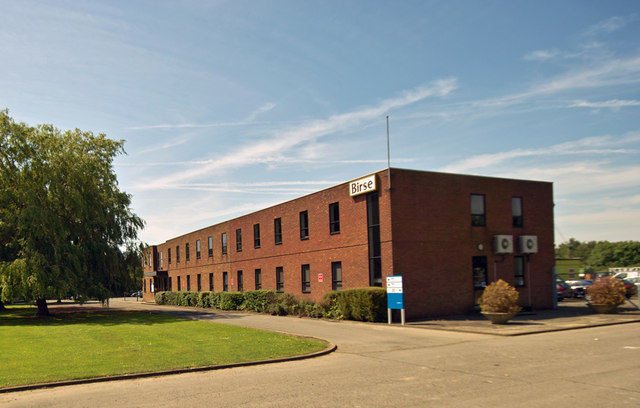
Birse Group Services in June 2008

== Notable projects ==
Notable projects included:

- Glanford Park, home of Scunthorpe United FC, completed in 1988
- Mulberry Place completed in 1992
- West Stand at Old Trafford in Manchester, completed in 1993
- Reebok Stadium in Bolton completed in 1997
- Restoration of the Royal Exchange, Manchester completed in 1998
- Madejski Stadium in Reading completed in 1998
- Walkers Stadium in Leicester completed in 2002
- KC Stadium in Kingston upon Hull completed in 2002
- BBC Yorkshire headquarters in Leeds completed in 2004
