= Mulberry Place =

Municipal building in London, England

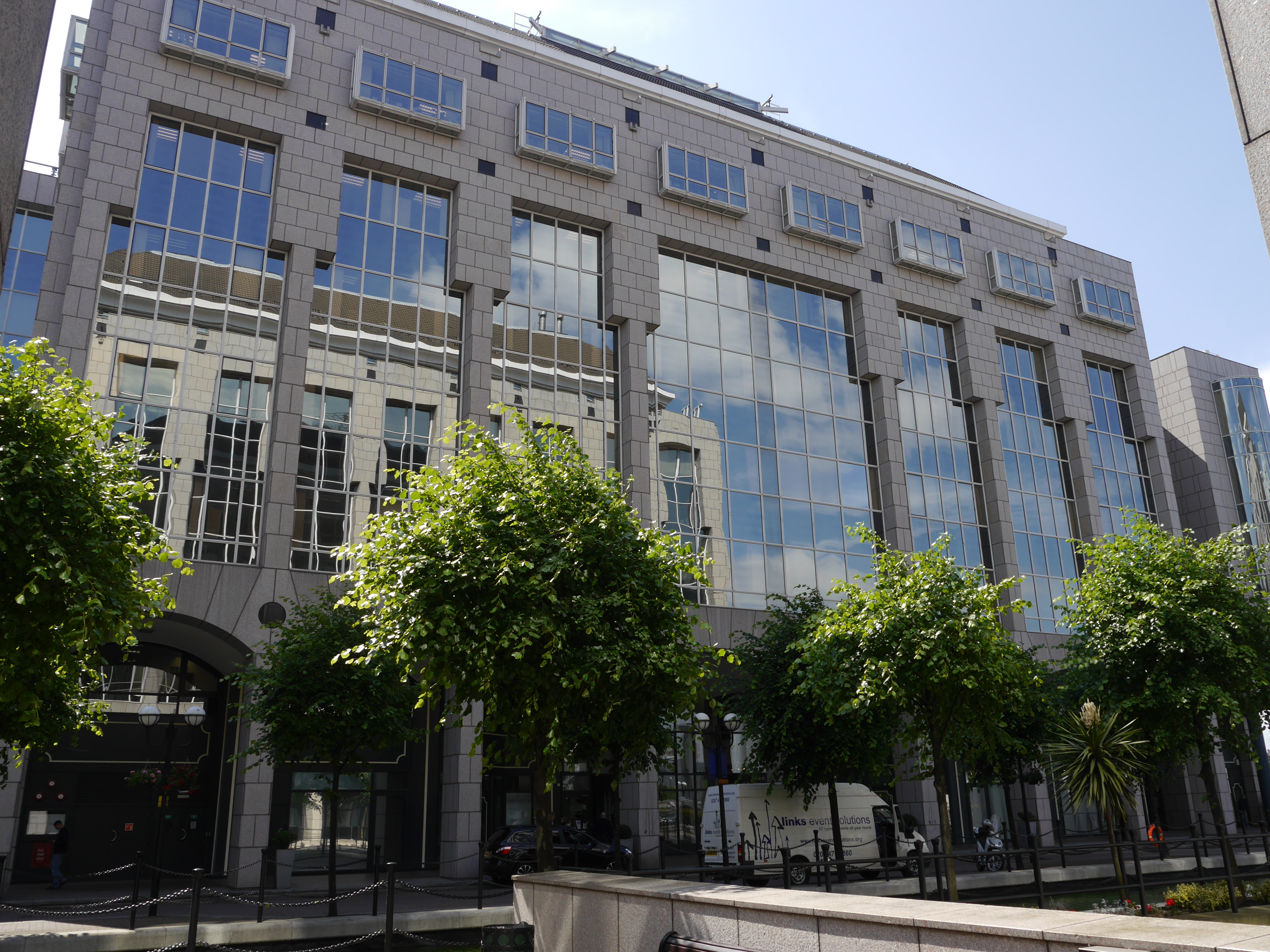
- View of Mulberry Place

- Shown in Tower Hamlets
- 51.5100°N 0.0062°W
- Location: Mulberry Place, Blackwall

History
- Built: 1992

Site notes
- Architect(s): Sten Samuelson and the Beaton Thomas Partnership
- Architectural style: Modernist style

Mulberry Place, formerly Tower Hamlets Town Hall, is a building in Nutmeg Lane, Blackwall, London. It was the headquarters of Tower Hamlets London Borough Council from 1992 to 2023, before their relocation to the new Tower Hamlets Town Hall in Whitechapel Road.

== History ==
The London Borough of Tower Hamlets was formed in 1965 by the merger of the Metropolitan Boroughs of Bethnal Green, Poplar and Stepney. The new authority was initially based at Bethnal Green Town Hall.

In the early 1990s, the council decided to move to a more modern building, on the site of the former East India Import Dock. The new Town Hall, completed in 1992 and occupied the following year, was built by the Nordic Construction Company, with Birse Construction the main contractor. The new building formed part of a larger development of four linked blocks, designed by Sten Samuelson and the Beaton Thomas Partnership in the Modernist style. The design made extensive use of reflective glazing and pink Sardinian granite.

The name Mulberry Place commemorates the construction of Mulberry harbours in the dock during the Second World War, and reflects the sprig of mulberry included in the boroughs coat of arms in recognition of the East End's weaving heritage. The ship bell of the sloop HMS Crane is placed in the Town Hall foyer. The ship was adopted by the Borough of Bethnal Green during the Second World War and the connection with the ship and its crew has been maintained ever since.

In February 2015 the council acquired the old Royal London Hospital in Whitechapel Road and announced plans to convert it for use as the new Tower Hamlets Town Hall to which the council would relocate when it became available.

In 2018, the Mulberry Place building's owner LaSalle Investment, which charges £5 million per year in rent for Mulberry Place, announced that it would convert the building into flats after the council moved. The move to the new site was completed on 1 March 2023.
