= Blackwall Buildings =

Former housing blocks in London, England

Coordinates: 51.5209°N 0.0626°W

Blackwall Buildings were housing blocks built in 1890 in Thomas Street, Whitechapel. Its first tenants were rehoused from an area that had been cleared during railway construction work, and they paid a nominal rent. By the late 1960s the buildings had fallen into disrepair.

Thomas Street was later renamed Fulbourne Street, and the housing was demolished in 1969.

== History ==
Originally built by the Great Eastern Railway Blackwall Buildings were started because of an obligation created by Parliament when large scale Engineering works were constructed and a number of houses were demolished, that these dwellings be replaced and the people re-housed. In 1885 the London and Blackwall Railway applied to Parliament for permission to widen their line between Fenchurch Street and Stepney. This was granted and as a result the houses demolished had to be replaced. Blackwall Buildings were the result. The Buildings were thought to have been actually built by Mark Gentry from Castle Hedingham, He had a depot in Stratford and built many similar philanthropic flats. There is no first hand proof of this, but it is highly likely from the style of the Buildings. The London and Blackwall Railway was leased to the Great Eastern Railway and all the major construction work for this line was carried out by the Great Eastern.

The first mention of the buildings is in Charles Booth's Life and Labour of the People of London. In 1889 Booth surveyed the area around Thomas Street and says of Blackwall Buildings,

North up Queen Ann St. 3 st. [3 storey[, rough, children very ragged, some prostitutes. Bread and bits of raw meat in the roadway, windows broken & dirty; all english: one woman called out "let us be guv'nor dont pull the houses down & turn us out! On the West side not coloured in map is a small court: hot potato can standing idle, dark, narrow. D/blue N (North) up Thomas St. at the N.W. corner 10 men waiting for the Casual Ward to open. (It opens at 4, it was now 1.45PM). North end of Thomas St is a gate leading to private Rd. on the West side of which are 3 blocks of dwellings called Blackwall Blds belonging to Blackwall Railway. decent class. purple. at either end is a gateway which is shut at night. The furthest gate opens on to the stoneyard of the White Chapel Union.

Purple refers to his classification of the state of poverty and is "Mixed. Some comfortable others poor". This gated community was at the time good quality housing and offered a relief from the poverty around. The gates were designed so the residents could not stay out late at night and get too drunk in local pubs. It was known as "philanthropic housing" as the tenants paid a nominal rent. However, not everyone liked this new housing, which was open and airy and very different from the surrounding slums. In "A Child of the Jago" by Arthur Morrison (1896) mention is made of the fact the slums offered refuge from the police and a place of sanctuary when this was needed. The new housing did not offer such a refuge.

In 1933 the Freehold of the Buildings were sold by the London and North Eastern Railway. This company took over the Great Eastern in 1923. The sale realised £21,300 and was managed by Reynolds and Eason of Bishopsgate. At the time the rent roll was £3226 for 156 flats. The purchasers were Challoner's of Kensington.

During the period from the sale until their demolition in 1969 the buildings fell into disrepair and by 1969 were regarded as slums by the residents.

== Layout of buildings ==
The buildings were in four blocks, each four stories high. They were mainly two room flats, although one flat on each floor of each of the blocks (making 16 flats in all) had three rooms. Up to a dozen people lived in each flat according to the United Kingdom Census 1901. The flats were staircase orientated - with four flats leading from each landing. There was a cast iron range in each flat and two communal toilets on each floor. There was also a washroom/scullery for communal use on each floor.

Most flats used blankets or curtains to divide the beds within a room for privacy. Bedbugs were rife as were other forms of vermin. It is thought they lived in the lathe and plaster walls.

== Notable residents ==
=== Mary Hughes (1860-1941) ===
Mary "May" Hughes was a voluntary parish worker. This work took her into slums, workhouses, doss houses and infirmaries (including ones for people with venereal disease, known as lock wards), to try to better the state of these places and share the troubles of the lower classes. She often became personally involved in cases. Hughes increasingly lived as one of the poor, keeping her diet simple (bread, margarine, little pieces of cheese and rudimentary vegetables), not buying goods such as new clothes that she saw as luxuries, not holidaying or sleeping on mattressed beds and in 1915 moving into the community settlement of Kingsley Hall, Bow. The Hall was an old chapel that was re-decorated and fitted by local volunteers in 1915. It was a 'people's house', where locals including, workmen, factory girls and children came together for worship, study, fun and friendship in order to better their lives.

In 1917 Hughes was made a Justice of the Peace for Shoreditch, she specialised in rates and educational cases and was commonly known to cry at the evidence and pay fines for the poor.

Hughes referred to herself as a Christian and a communist. She took part in marches of London's unemployed, even when mounted police were in attendance. She was also a pacifist for example, after the German blitz on London (1940) she was appalled by people, especially Christians, who called for retaliation. Christianity was an important factor in Hughes' life and what drove her social work. In 1918 she joined the Quakers (Society of Friends) and moved to Blackwall Buildings, Whitechapel in order to become a poor law guardian and volunteer visitor to the local poor law infirmary and children's home. Locally she was known as a benefactor of the poor and local unemployed people would knock on her door seeing if she knew of work. In 1928 Hughes moved to a converted pub on Vallance Road, Whitechapel and renamed it the Dew Drop Inn. The purpose of the Inn was to act as a social centre and refuge for the local homeless. Through the 1920s and 1930s she was passionately involved with the problems of the unemployed and she took part in a number of marches and rallies. In 1931 when Mohandas K. Gandhi was visiting Britain for the Commonwealth conference, he insisted on meeting Hughes. When they met, they clasped hands, looked at each other and burst out laughing. Hardly a word was said but "each had recognised the quality of the other's life".

Mary Hughes died on 2 April 1941 in Whitechapel.

=== Alfred Martin (1886-1915) ===
PC Alfred Arthur Martin was born on 12 March 1886 to James and Eliza Martin of Orpington, Kent. He lived at number 51 Blackwall Buildings with his wife Caroline Martin. The officer joined the Railway Police in June 1914 having transferred from the Engineers Department of the Great Eastern Railway. He served as a sergeant, number 5918, in the 10th Battalion of the Highland Light Infantry in World War I. He was killed in action on Friday 12 November 1915 at the young age of 31. Martin is buried at Ypres reservoir Cemetery in Belgium.

=== Cornelius James Murphy (1894-1960) ===
Son of a John Murphy, a post office porter, and his wife Johanna Jeffers, a tailoress, Cornelius James Murphy was born into relative poverty at 150 Blackwall Buildings on 11 June 1894. In spite of his under-privileged early childhood, he became a highly regarded Reuters journalist and foreign correspondent who was witness to and reported on some of the most momentous occasions of the 20th century. Special Operations Executive has personnel files on Murphy, for 1939–1946, open since 1 January 2003, but not digitised.

The following obituary for Murphy appeared in the Journal of the Institute of Journalists in 1960:

Mr. Cornelius James Murphy, noted over many years for his distinguished handling of Continental assignments in Reuter’s foreign news service, died recently in his early sixties at his London home. He had been a member of the Institute since 1929.

Educated in Belgium and Switzerland, Mr. Murphy was an accomplished linguist and, with his studies interrupted by the outbreak of the First World War, served with the British Military Intelligence in France and Italy, and also became a pilot in the Royal Flying Corps.

He joined Reuter’s in 1919, worked with them until 1936, first as a sub-editor on the Overseas Desk, and then as night chief sub-editor. During this home-based period he carried out a number of special journalistic missions abroad, including the Gialdini trial in Milan in 1933; the hazardous 1936 flight of the airship "Hindenburg" to America; and frontier reporting of the Spanish civil war the same year.

In September 1936 he went to Paris as Reuter’s chief correspondent and in October, 1938, he was transferred to Rome as chief Reuter man there for the critical events leading up to Mussolini’s break with this country and France. After the Fascist declaration of war in the summer of 1940, Mr. Murphy left Italy in an Anglo-Italian exchange of their respective London-Rome foreign correspondents; and after a short assignment with the Atlantic Fleet, he took over Reuter’s office in Lisbon. But in 1941 he left his long association with Reuter’s to engage in a journalistic-cum-special service mission in South America, on completion of which he served with the Intelligence Corps in the West of England.

On creation of the Brussels Treaty Organisation, Mr. Murphy was appointed their P.R.O., but left when work was confined to Cultural relations, and afterwards became P.R.O. to British-South American Airways, taking part in the first "week-end" south trans-atlantic flight. After a spell as leader-writer on foreign affairs at Kemsley House, Mr.Murphy switched to Australian news services and at the time of his death was still in harness, working with his perennial youthful verve at the London headquarters of the Australian Broadcasting Commission.
