= Whitechapel Road market =

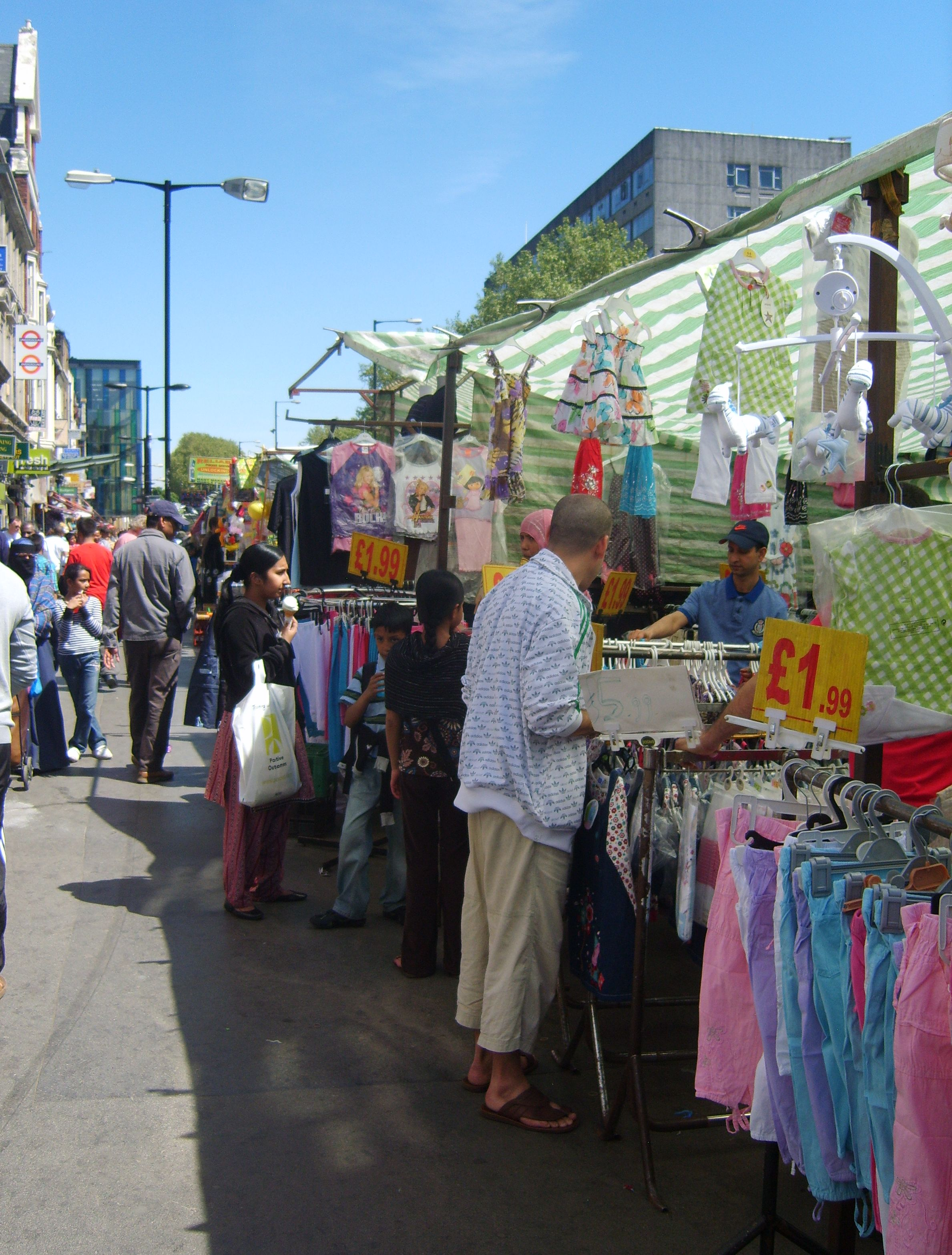
- Location: Whitechapel Road (Vallance Road to Cambridge Heath Road), London, E1 1DT; Whitechapel
- Opening date: 1904
- Management: Tower Hamlets Market Services
- Owner: Tower Hamlets London Borough Council
- Environment: Street
- Goods sold: General goods
- Days normally open: Monday to Saturday (8am to 6pm)
- Interactive map of Whitechapel Road market

Whitechapel Road market, also known as Whitechapel Market is a long-established historic London outdoor street market managed by the London Borough of Tower Hamlets which is centered on the A11 thoroughfare of the same name in Whitechapel in the East End of London, next to Whitechapel station and is the focus point of the Whitechapel Market Conservation Area that was set up in 1997 and extended in 2008.

== History ==
In 1904 Metropolitan Borough of Stepney sought to take control of the market on the waste in Whitechapel to regulate nuisance traders. Terms were agreed with the Manor of Stepney in 1909 and the Council acquired strips on both north and south sides from Vallance Road east into Mile End Gate where gardens were laid out in 1909–10. Once regulated, trading west of Mile End Gate came to be called Whitechapel Market, though it is still regularly referred to as ‘the Waste’. It was noted in the 1970s for clothing, jewellery, flowers, second-hand records and hi-fi equipment. By the 1980s, when there were 124 pitches between Vallance Road and Cambridge Heath Road, the market was being transformed by a transition to Bangladeshi stallholders. They remain predominant, and there is still much clothing, as well as a range of foods hard to come by elsewhere.

Whitechapel Market was the first market in the United Kingdom to recycle all the waste it generates in 2008. Tower Hamlets Council launched this special new service at a special event that was attended by television presenter, former borough resident and champion of the environment Oliver Heath. He helped the council mark the event by setting up a stall at the market to hand out information about recycling and re-usable shopping bags to passing market customers.

A major operation was coordinated by the Metropolitan Police and the UK Border Agency (UKBA) in 2013 that led to 38 people being arrested or detained. Police also seized more than 500 mobile phones as they rifled through goods at 10 shops and stalls for which search warrants were issued.

Members of Tower Hamlets Wheelers lobby group arrived at Whitechapel Market in 2014 to try to win over stall-holders who have objected to Tfl plans to upgrade a stretch of Whitechapel Road where six cyclists have been killed since 2011. The traders fear a segregated route would cut into the street market and block their deliveries. 30 campaigning cyclists arrived with baskets on their machines and filled up with shopping while trying to convince the traders about how upgrading the current CS2 route would be good for business. The group talked to stall-holders about their concerns and promised they would work with them to make sure the upgrade benefits all parties and were confident that more people will visit the market by bike if it’s made safe.

In 2015, Elsayed Hosny, 64, was punished after he pleaded guilty to failing protect food from contamination at the unit in Brady Street and his business was closed for several weeks after environmental health officers discovered a mouse infestation at the premises.

== Whitechapel Market Conservation Area ==
The Whitechapel Market Conservation Area was designated in June 1997 and extended in October 2008. The Conservation Area is named after the market and lies between Cambridge Heath Road to the East London Mosque and Davenant Centre to the West, Whitechapel Road to the south and Durward Street to the north. Many of the buildings fronting Whitechapel Road Market are of architectural and historical importance, and Whitechapel Road itself is an important and historically significant movement route within East London.

== Trade ==
The market has developed into a prosperous social and economic that sells a huge array of commodities 6 days a week (Monday to Saturday). Visitors can buy there fresh and exotic fruits and vegetables, different kind of spices, fashion such as cultural wear, bags, scarves and jewellery.

== Management ==
The market is publicly managed and owned by the London Borough of Tower Hamlets Market Service, the market regulatory service based in Commercial Street, Spitalfields who promotes, licences, develop and support to traders. They also take the approach to market management as an investment in the future, not just solely a regulatory function.
