= Muslim Community Radio =

Former Islamic radio station in the United Kingdom

Coordinates: 51°31′3″N 0°3′57″W

London; England
- Frequency: 1143 AM

Programming
- Languages: English and Bengali
- Format: Variety, Islamic radio

Ownership
- Owner: Islamic Forum Europe

History
- First air date: 1998
- Former frequencies: 101.4 FM, 87.8FM

Links
- Website: www.mcrlive.net

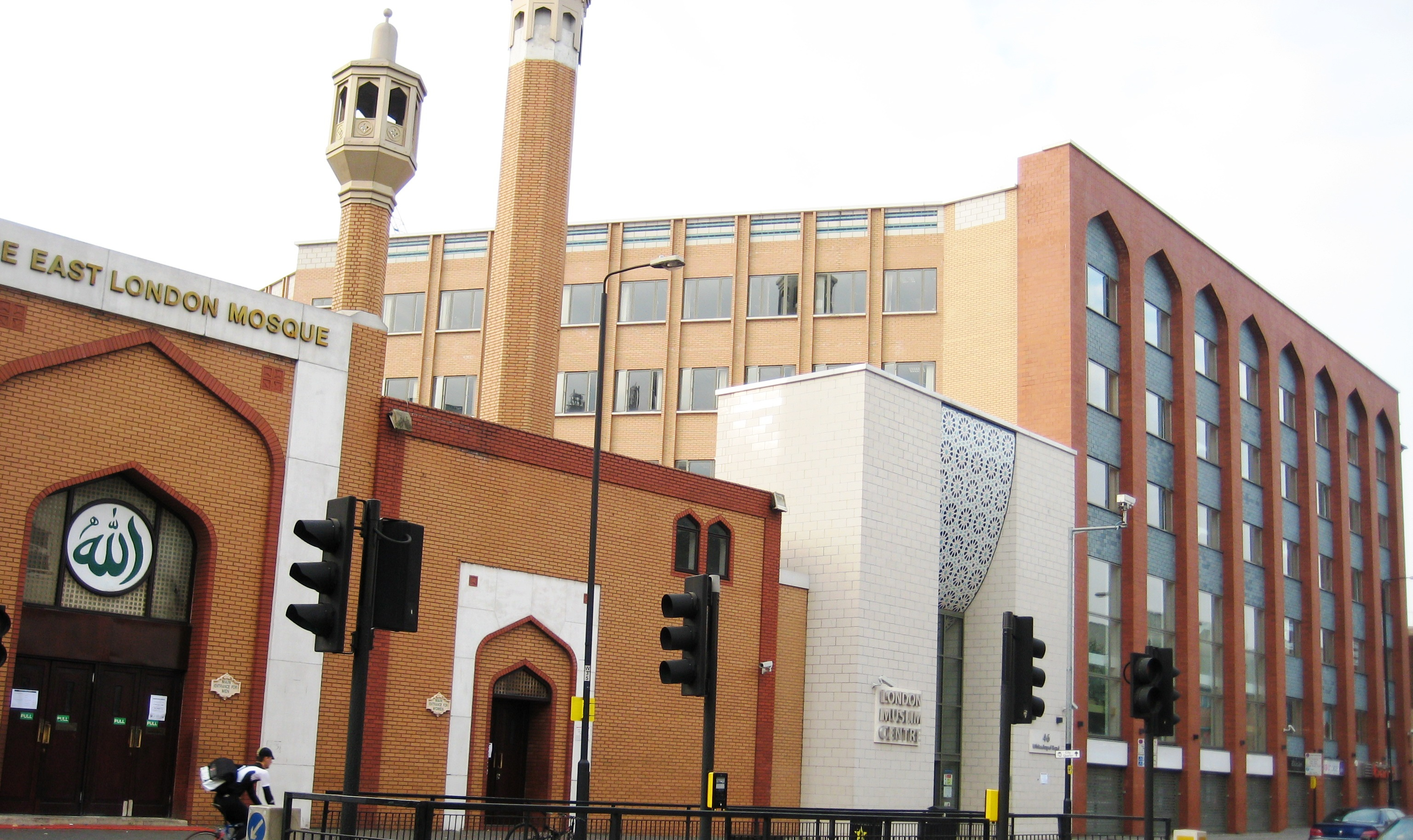
Mosque and London Muslim Centre

Muslim Community Radio (MCR) also known as Ramadan Radio was a radio station based in London, United Kingdom founded in 1998. The station used to run through FM radio, at 87.7 FM (formerly 1143AM, 87.8 FM & 101.4 FM prior to that), and only broadcast annually during the holy month of Ramadan. The slogan of the radio station is 'Ramadan Special'.

== History ==
The station broadcasts from the London Muslim Centre, which is located next to the East London Mosque on Whitechapel Road in Tower Hamlets. It started to broadcast in 1998 through a RSL, then through Spectrum in the next years, and since 2001 acquired the rights to broadcast 24 hours across east London during the holy month of Ramadan. Its presenters are volunteers. The Islamic Forum Europe runs the radio station with assistance from the Young Muslim Organisation, the Junior Muslim Circle, the East London Mosque and the London Muslim Centre.

It provides programmes for women, children's shows, quiz shows, fiqh sessions, taraweeh prayer, and shows such as Daily Halaqa, Qur'anic class, Easy Talk, Drive Time and others, in English and Bengali and is also popular among the Bengali community in East London.

In October 2008, Muslim Community Radio raised £1.2m along with viewers of ethnic satellite channel and Channel S for the East London mosque campaign. On the same year, East London Mosque & London Muslim Centre continued their partnership with Islamic Forum of Europe (IFE) to broadcast during Ramadan.

== Programmes ==
As of 2008

- Daily Halaqa
- Dhikr AM
- Women's Programme
- Notun Jeeboner Shuchona (Bengali)
- Qur'anic Arabic
- Qur'an Class
- Community Matters
- Journey to Islam
- Children's Show
- Drive Time
- Iftar Programme
- Prime Time MCR Local/Global
- Easy Talk
- Suhur Programme (Bengali)

As of 2013

- Children's Show
- Drive Time
- Women's Hour
- Dhikir AM
- Quranic Pearls
- Charity Fundraising

== See also ==
- East London Mosque
- Islamic Forum of Europe
