= Whitechapel Road =

Street in the London Borough of Tower Hamlets

Coordinates: 51°31′06″N 0°03′48″W

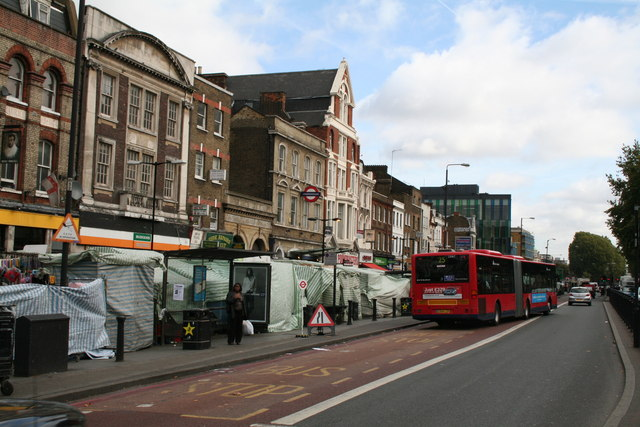
Looking east on Whitechapel Road, near Whitechapel tube station. The street market is on the left.

Whitechapel Road is a major arterial road in Whitechapel, Tower Hamlets, in the East End of London. It is named after a small chapel of ease dedicated to St Mary and connects Whitechapel High Street to the west with Mile End Road to the east in Stepney. The road is part of the historic Roman road from London to Colchester, now the A11.

The road had become built up by the 19th century and is now a main shopping district in the Whitechapel area. Along the road, there is an established market, Whitechapel station and the Royal London Hospital. It remains an important road and is marked with bus lanes, with limited parking.

Several ethnic minority communities have centred on Whitechapel Road. The road was a focal point of the Jewish Community from the 1850s to the 1930s, with many Jewish shops and market stalls. Towards the latter part of the 20th century, the street became an established settlement of the British Bangladeshi community, who now sell a range of authentic Asian food and clothes in the market and on shop fronts. Altab Ali Park sits on the site of the original church at the western end of Whitechapel Road, and is a memorial to an Asian worker who suffered a fatal racial attack in 1978.

== Geography ==
The road's name, along with the area, is derived from the original 14th century White Chapel. It follows the section of the Roman road between Londinium (London) and Camulodunum (Colchester), which connected to the Pye Road to Venta Icenorum (Caistor St Edmund near Norwich). The section of the Roman road that is now Whitechapel Road is a Primary A-road, the A11, and has bus lanes running along its length. Owing to the popularity of the market, parking is heavily restricted, limited to occasional parking metered spaces along the road.

Cycle Superhighway CS2 runs along Whitechapel Road. The nearest London Underground stations are Whitechapel station and Aldgate East station and the nearest National Rail station is Bethnal Green railway station. A number of local London Buses routes run along Whitechapel Road, including 25, 205 and 254.

== History ==
The road has been an important thoroughfare and coaching route for centuries. Whitechapel High Street and Whitechapel Road are shown on John Rocque's Map of London, 1746, both marked as "White Chapel". On John Cary's "Environs of London" of 1795 (published in his New Itinerary of 1798) there are properties on both sides of the road. By the ninth edition in 1821, the road is shown as extensively built up. In the mid-19th century, drovers steered livestock from local farms along the road towards Smithfield Market, causing considerable traffic congestion. By the 1870s, the road had become extensively developed with properties along the entire stretch of the road.

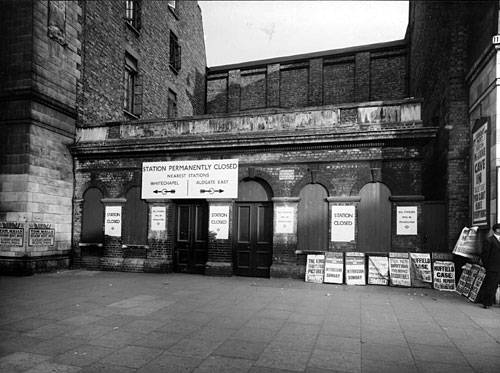
St. Mary's (Whitechapel Road) tube station on Whitechapel Road, shortly after closure in 1938. The building was destroyed in 1940.

The Whitechapel Bell Foundry, a principal supplier of church bells in Britain, was, until its closure in 2017, based at 32–34 Whitechapel Road. The buildings date from 1670 and are Grade II listed. Originally a coaching inn known as the Artichoke, it was occupied by the foundry from 1738, replacing smaller premises on the north side of the road. Davenant Foundation School moved to No. 173 Whitechapel Road in 1818. The school expanded with a new hall and classrooms in 1896, with further improvements in 1909. However, a decreasing child population meant that in 1965, the school moved to Loughton, Essex. The building remains on the north side and is Grade II listed.

Continuing eastwards, Whitechapel station is on the north side of the road, alongside the street market. Behind the tube station is the former site of Blackwall Buildings a set of philanthropic houses built in 1890. Just to the east of the market are almshouses at Trinity House, that were originally built in 1695 for retired seamen.

Nearby is the former site of St. Mary's (Whitechapel Road) tube station. It opened in March 1884 but its close proximity to both Whitechapel and Aldgate East tube stations made it superfluous, leading to its closure in April 1938. It was used as an air raid shelter in the Second World War, but was destroyed by bombing in 1940. Opposite to the south is the former Royal London Hospital building, built in 1740. The hospital suffered significant structural damage during the Second World War, but much of the 18th and 19th centuries architecture still remains. A new building now sits adjacent to the original.

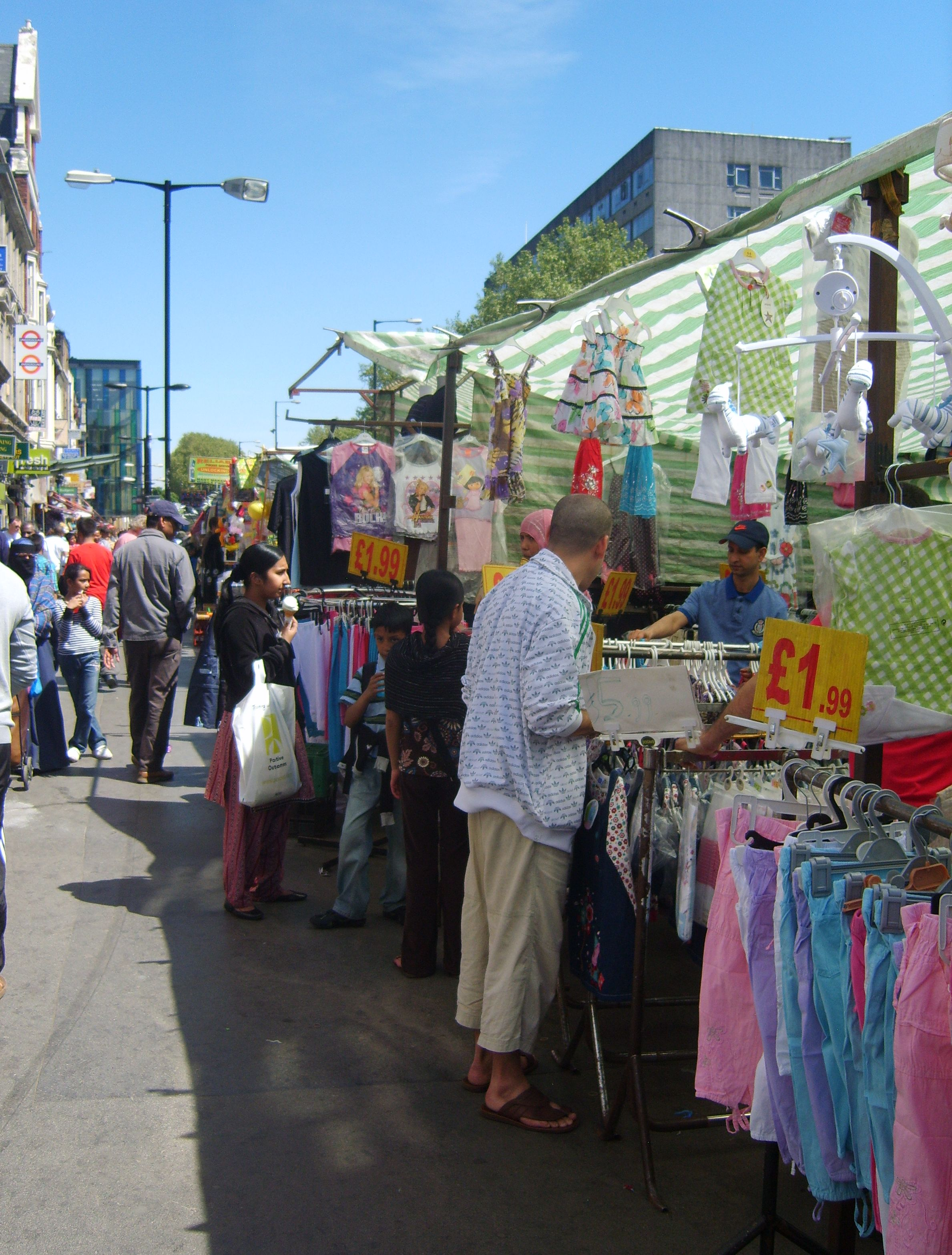
Whitechapel Road market

The Pavilion Theatre opened on Nos.191–193 Whitechapel Road, the site of a former clothes factory, in 1828. It was the first major theatre to open in the East End of London. The original building was destroyed in a fire in 1856, and was replaced by a larger theatre that could accommodate over 1,000 people, becoming the centre of Yiddish theatre in Britain. It closed in 1934.

During the 1940s, the Metropolitan Police attempted to crack down on illegal gambling held in social clubs along Whitechapel Road. The Brancroft Social Club was based at No. 69, and in March 1944, a police raid uncovered unlicensed horse and dog race betting which led to the arrest of the club's owner and 21 patrons.

The Albion Brewery was first established at the eastern end of Whitechapel Road in 1808 by Richard Ivory, landlord of the Blind Beggar. In 1860, the brewery was rebuilt, producing an average of 133,000 barrels of beer a year. It closed in 1979.

The Eastern District Post Office is based at the eastern end of Whitechapel Road, on the south side. This was the eastern terminus for the former London Post Office Railway (colloquially known as the "Mail Rail"), built to allow fast mail transfers across London. It closed in 2003. Beyond this is Mile End Gate – where the road becomes Mile End Road; and was the site of the former toll gate.

== Community ==
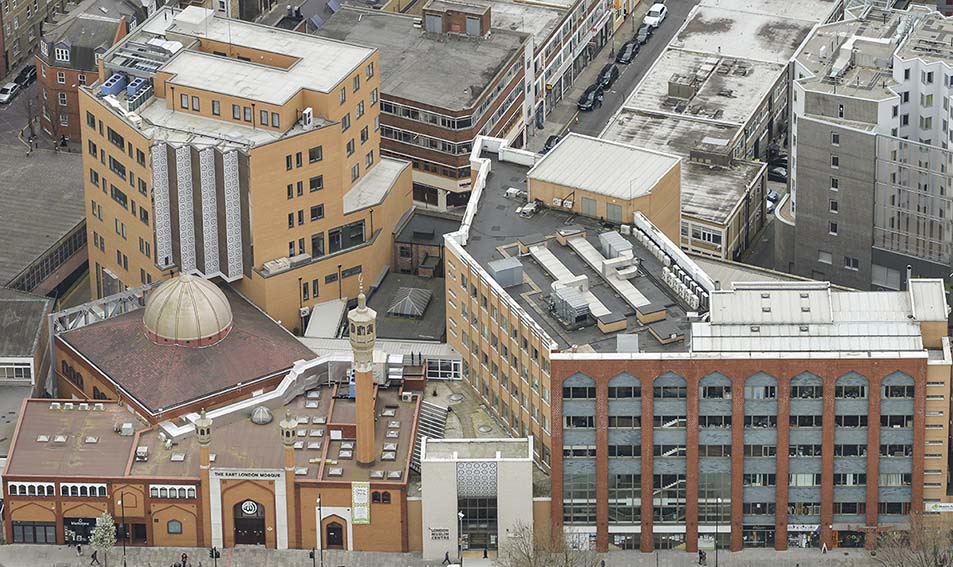
The East London Mosque has been established on Whitechapel Road since 1985.

The road has been the centre of several ethnic minority groups in London. In the 1840s, many Irish emigrated to avoid the Great Famine and began street selling at Whitechapel Market and along Whitechapel Road.

The Jewish community settled on and around Whitechapel Road from the 1850s onwards. In the 1880s, the community expanded rapidly as Ashkenazi Jews fled to Britain and took over many of the shops and market stalls on the street. For the remainder of the century and much of the 20th, the road was the focal point of the community. The nearby Jewish Free School was, at one point, the largest educational establishment in the world, with over 4,300 pupils. A fountain opposite the Royal London Hospital in memory of King Edward VII has the inscription "erected from subscriptions raised by Jewish inhabitants of East London". On 4 October 1936, British Union of Fascists leader Oswald Mosley organised an anti-Jewish parade through the East End that included passing through Whitechapel Road, but was stopped by a crowd of protesters. The sentiment against Jews in Whitechapel Road caused the community to dissolve from the 1930s onwards; the Pavilion Theatre closed and the Jewish Free School was destroyed in the Blitz during the Second World War. The Yiddish newspaper The Jewish Times (Die Zeit) was produced at No. 135 Whitechapel Road from 1913 to 1936.

Towards the end of the 20th century, the street, along with nearby Brick Lane became the centre of the British Bangladeshi community. The East London Mosque on Whitechapel Road was opened by Shaykh Abdullah bin Subayl in 1985 and can accommodate over 3,000 worshippers, with dedicated facilities for women. The nearby London Muslim Centre opened in 2003. Whitechapel Market caters well for the community, with stalls stocking Asian fruit and vegetables including okra and mangoes, clothing such as tunics and pashminas, and mobile phone cards for cheap long-distance calls. A racially motivated attack on local worker Altab Ali near Whitechapel Road in May 1978 was a significant event for the local Asian community, and his life is now commemorated in Altab Ali Park at the western end of the road, which was built on the former St Mary's Church grounds.

== Events ==
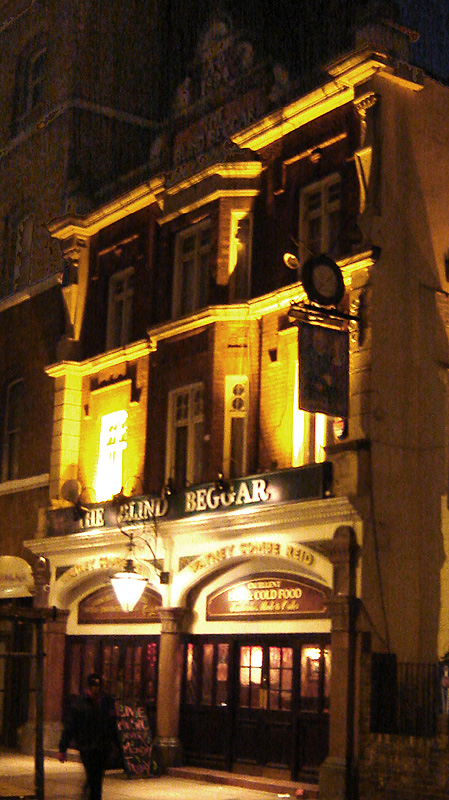
The Blind Beggar public house, 337 Whitechapel Road

The area around Whitechapel Road is notorious for the 19th century Whitechapel murders, which are believed to be linked to Jack the Ripper. One of the first victims was Martha Tabram, who was found with multiple stab wounds on George Yard Buildings, Whitechapel Road on 7 August 1888.

Joseph Merrick, the Elephant Man, moved to Whitechapel Road in 1884. Visitors paid to see him in the back room of a shop owned by showman Tom Norman. The shop was directly opposite the Royal London Hospital, and Merrick was frequently visited by doctors. Merrick later moved to the hospital permanently, where he spent the last years of his life.

The Blind Beggar is at No. 337 and was the founding point of the Salvation Army following a meeting outside the pub by William Booth in 1865. On 9 March 1966, the venue became notorious after Ronnie Kray fatally shot George Cornell at the pub. The premises remains open for business, though it has been refurbished several times. The Kray Twins also used the Blackwall Buildings, by then dilapidated, as a form of punishment by locking a victim in a flat alone with Ronnie's German Shepherd dog.

== Cultural references ==
Whitechapel Road is the equal cheapest property location on the British version of the Monopoly game board. Both it and the Old Kent Road are priced at £60. In reality, increasing property prices across London meant that the average house price on Whitechapel Road in 2013 was £295,082.

== See also ==
- Salomon v A Salomon & Co Ltd [1897] AC 22, the most famous UK company law case, about a business on Whitechapel High Street.
- Richard Plunkett (beadle)
- Whitechapel Mount, prominent landmark of disputed origin
