= Aldgate (disambiguation) =

Aldgate may refer to:

- Aldgate, one of the city gates of the City of London, the name of a road near the site of the gate, and the name of a Ward of the City centred on the road
- Aldgate tube station in the City of London
- Aldgate East tube station in the London Borough of Tower Hamlets
- Aldgate, Rutland a village in the County of Rutland, England
- Aldgate, South Australia, a town in the Adelaide Hills in Australia
