= Abdul Qayum (imam) =

British scholar and Imam (born 1960)

Sheikh Abdul Qayum
- আব্দুল কাইয়ুম
- Born: 1 March 1960 (age 66); Noakhali District, East Pakistan
- Citizenship: British
- Occupations: Imam, lecturer, religious leader
- Organization(s): East London Mosque; European Council for Fatwa and Research

Abdul Qayum (Bengali: আব্দুল কাইয়ুম, Arabic: مُحَمَّد عَبْدُ الْقَيُّوم; born 1 March 1960) is a British Bangladeshi scholar and the chief imam of the East London Mosque. A former lecturer at the International Islamic University Malaysia, Abdul Qayum also served as a presenter on Islamic programs on Peace TV and Channel 9.

== Background ==
Abdul Qayum was born in the District of Noakhali in East Pakistan (now Bangladesh). He studied Islamic sciences and Hadith at the Government Madrasah-e-Alia in Dhaka and then continued his studies of Islamic sciences under several scholars in Riyadh, Saudi Arabia. At the Imam Mohammad Ibn Saud Islamic University, he completed a Bachelor of Arts in Arabic language and literature and a Master of Arts in applied linguistics. He then became a lecturer of Classical Arabic at the International Islamic University Malaysia.

After moving to the United Kingdom with his family, he was elected as the Khatib of the East London Mosque in 1993. In 2008, he was made aware of Richard House Children's Hospice and in 2010 he became a patron. He is a member of European Council for Fatwa and Research and National Council of Imams and Rabbis, which is a registered operating name of the Joseph Interfaith Foundation. He is also a signatory to Istanbul's Environmental Declaration.

Abdul Qayum studied hadith and other Islamic sciences alongside Akram Nadwi and attended SOAS University of London.

In early January 2021, he and some of his family members had tested positive for COVID-19 amid the pandemic, and were admitted to the Royal London Hospital for care.

== Current employment ==
- Head Imam and Khateeb of the East London Mosque
