= St Mary's (Whitechapel Road) tube station =

Disused station on the London Underground

St Mary's (Whitechapel Road)
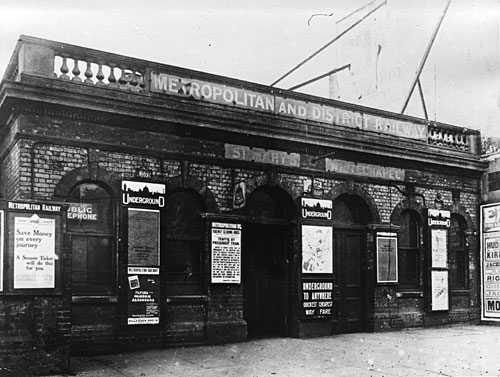
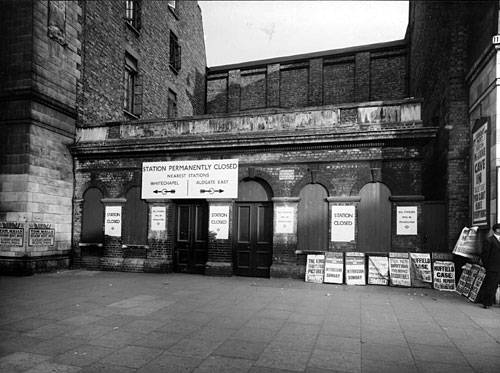
- Entrance in 1916 Shortly after closure in 1938

General information
- Location: Whitechapel, Stepney, London
- Coordinates: 51°31′04″N 0°03′52.5″W
- Owner: London Transport
- Platforms: 2

Other information
- Status: Disused

History
- Opened: 3 March 1884
- Closed: 1 May 1938
- Electrified: 1905
- Former names: St Mary's (Whitechapel)
- Original company: Metropolitan and Metropolitan District Joint Railway

Key dates
- 26 January 1923: Renamed St Mary's (Whitechapel Road)
Location
- Interactive map of the location

St Mary's (Whitechapel Road) was a London Underground station located on Whitechapel Road in Whitechapel, England. The station was opened as St Mary's (Whitechapel) on 3 March 1884 on a new route connecting the District Railway and Metropolitan Railway with Whitechapel and the East London Railway. Services were initially provided by the South Eastern Railway from 3 March to 30 September 1884. The Metropolitan Railway and the District Railway, the joint owners of the station, provided services from 1 October 1884. Steam trains were replaced by electric in 1905 and 1906. The name was changed to St Mary's (Whitechapel Road) in 1923.

The station closed on 1 May 1938, and was replaced by the eastern exits of the relocated and rebuilt Aldgate East station. A connection to the East London Railway to the east of the station called the St Mary's Curve ceased to be used for passenger services in 1939. The bricked-up platforms were used as air-raid shelters during the Second World War, and the above-ground station building was destroyed by bombing. The converted platforms and some underground structures are still in place.

== History ==
St Mary's (Whitechapel) station opened on 3 March 1884. It had two underground side platforms and a simple brick station building on the south side of Whitechapel Road. Both elements of the station name are derived from the church of St Mary Matfelon. It was located on an eastern spur of the Metropolitan and Metropolitan District Joint Railway, a line that connected the eastern end of the District Railway (DR) at Mansion House to the Metropolitan Railway (the Met) at Aldgate and completed the Circle line. (Note: Authorised as the Metropolitan and District (City Lines and Extensions) Railway and also known as the "City Lines".) The railway through St Mary's permitted the DR to reach their new eastern terminus at Whitechapel, the DR and the Met to route trains onto the East London Railway (ELR) and for the South Eastern Railway (SER) to access the Met via the ELR.

The first service at the station was run by the SER between St Mary's and Addiscombe Road station in Croydon, making use of the connection to the ELR. The SER service last ran on 30 September 1884 with DR and Met services starting on 1 October 1884. (Note: Until 6 October 1884, services did not carry passengers west of St Mary's.) DR services were extended eastwards from Whitechapel in 1902. Fourth-rail electric services replaced steam trains run by the DR, and services on to the ELR were withdrawn on 1 August 1905. The Met withdrew their services running on to the ELR on 3 December 1906. Following electrification of the ELR, through Met services resumed on 31 March 1913. It was renamed St Mary's (Whitechapel Road) on 26 January 1923.

The DR and the Met were incorporated into London Transport on 1 July 1933 and became known as the District and Metropolitan lines. The eastern section of the District line was very overcrowded by the mid 1930s. In order to relieve this, the peak-hours Metropolitan line service was diverted from the ELR to Barking in 1936. Aldgate East, the next station to the west was resited further east and new entrances provided at the eastern end. St Mary's was less well used and the new eastern entrances would be very near to it, so it could be abandoned. It closed to passengers on 1 May 1938.

In 1940, during the Second World War, the disused platforms were leased to Stepney Borough Council for use as air-raid shelters. Works were required to convert the space, including bricking-up the platform edges with fletton bricks. It was planned to accommodate 848 people and additional space was also found under an adjacent building. Costs increased because the platforms were found to be wooden with an asphalt surface and had to be strengthened with concrete. The former station booking hall was intended to provide the entrance. It was destroyed by bombing on 22 October 1940, during the Blitz. A replacement entrance was also destroyed by bombing on 19 April 1941. The bricked-up platforms remain. Cast iron platform columns, holding up girders and the jack-arched roof are still in situ. The lattice-design footbridge remains, with decking and steps removed.

== St Mary's Curve ==
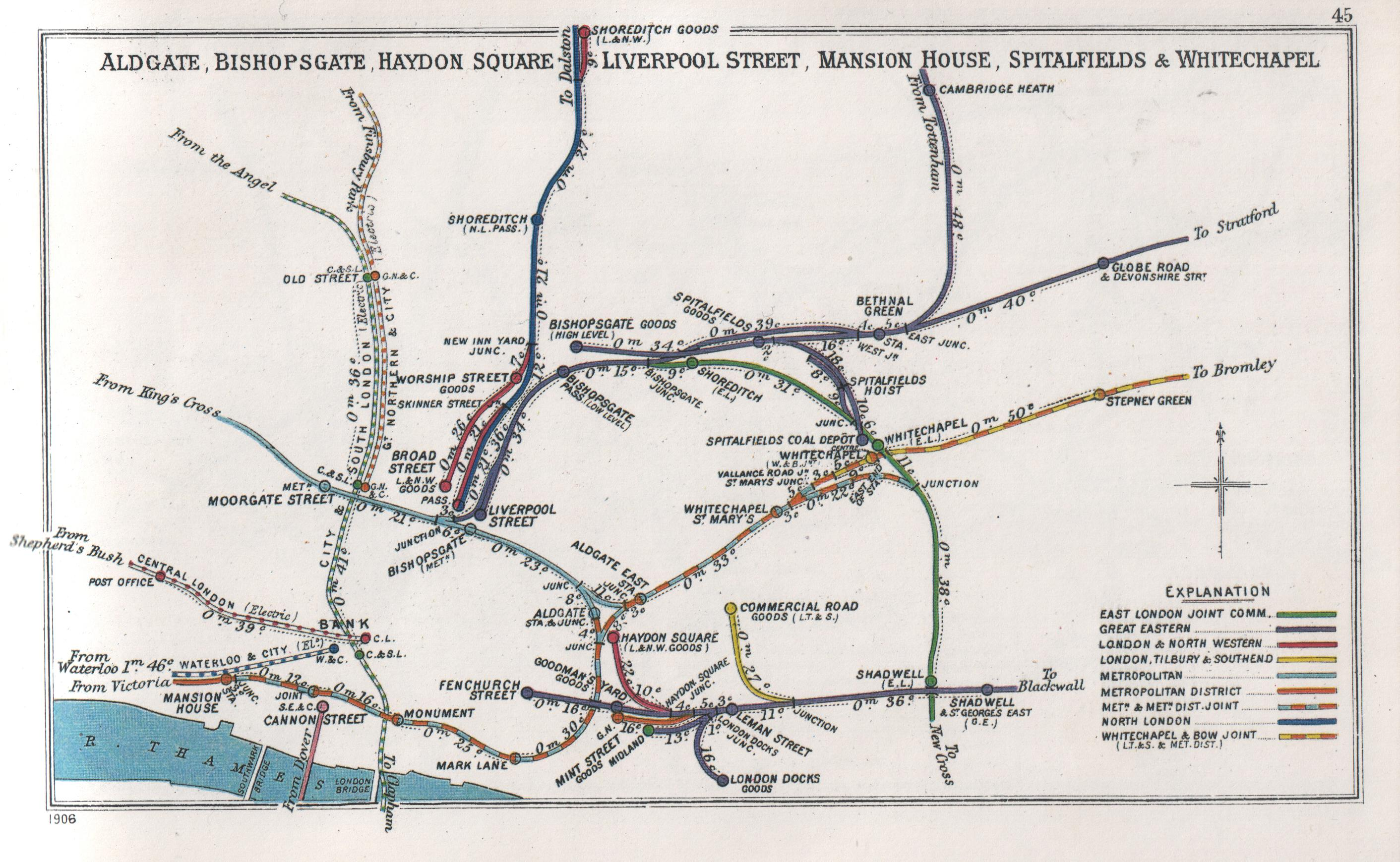
Railway Clearing House diagram of the Whitechapel area in 1906

The short 22-chain (1,500 ft; 440 m) connection between the DR/Met joint line and the ELR was known as the St Mary's Curve. It was built by the ELR and was first used on 3 March 1884 for the SER Addiscombe Road service. From 1 October 1884 ownership passed to the joint committee of the DR and the Met. The curve closed to passenger services on 3 December 1906, after the DR and the Met had converted to electric trains. The ELR and the curve were electrified and service resumed on 31 March 1913. Passenger services over the curve were withdrawn on 18 November 1939.

== Notes ==
Former services
Preceding station	London Underground	Following station
Aldgate East towards Wimbledon, Richmond or Ealing Broadway	District line (1884-1905)	Shadwell towards New Cross Gate
Aldgate East towards Wimbledon, Richmond or Ealing Broadway	District line (1884-1938)	Whitechapel towards Upminster
Aldgate East towards Hammersmith	Metropolitan line (1884-1906) (1913-38)	Shadwell towards New Cross or New Cross Gate
Aldgate East towards Verney Junction	Metropolitan line (1906-13)	Whitechapel Terminus
