= Beadle =

Officer or usher

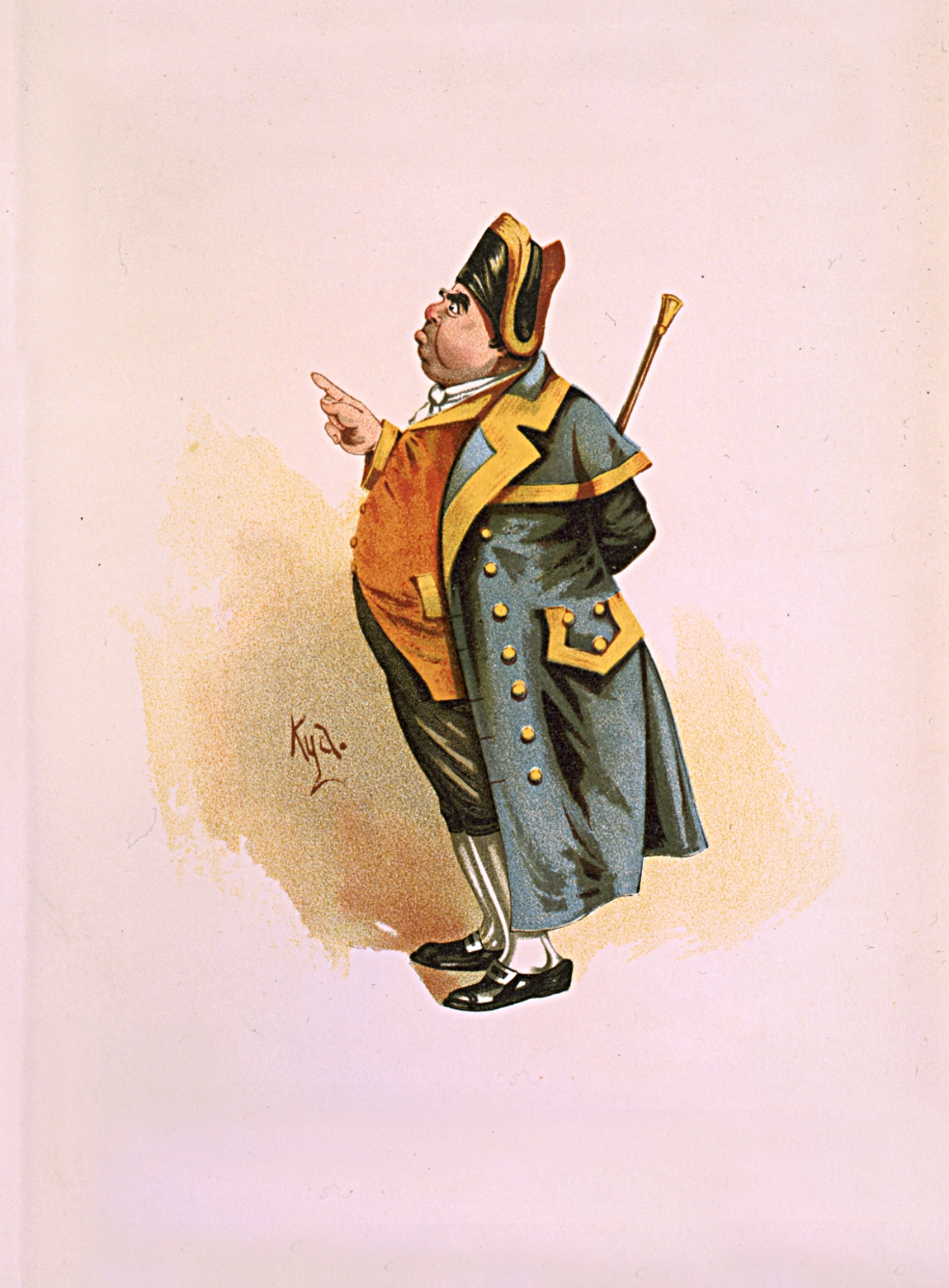
Mr. Bumble, a beadle in Oliver Twist, by 'Kyd' (Joseph Clayton Clarke)

A beadle, sometimes spelled bedel, is an official who may usher, keep order, make reports, and assist in religious functions; or a minor official who carries out various civil, educational or ceremonial duties on the manor.

The term has pre-Conquest origins in Old English, deriving from the Old English bydel ("herald, messenger from an authority, preacher"), itself deriving from beodan ("to proclaim", which has a modern descendant in the English verb bid). In Old English it was a title given to an Anglo-Saxon officer who summoned householders to council. It is also known in Medieval Latin as bedellus.

The Domesday Book refers to beadles as bedelli or undersheriffs of manors.

== In religion ==
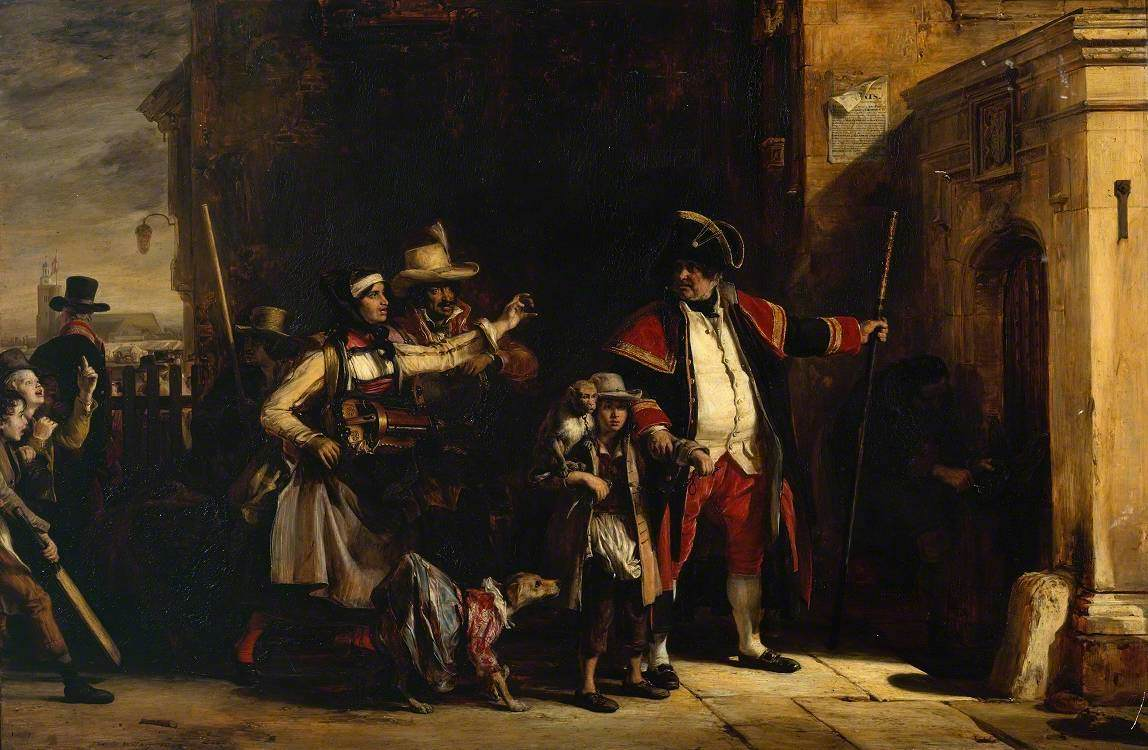
The Parish Beadle by David Wilkie, 1823

In England, the word came to refer to a parish constable of the Anglican Church, one often charged with duties of charity. A famous fictional constabulary beadle is Mr. Bumble from Charles Dickens's classic novel Oliver Twist, who oversees the parish workhouse and orphanage of a country town more than 75 miles (120 kilometres) from London. The work of a real constabulary beadle of Whitechapel in that period may be exemplified by Richard Plunkett.

In the Church of Scotland, the title is used for one who attends the minister during divine service as an assistant.

In Judaism, the term beadle or sexton (in Hebrew: שמש, romanized: shammash) is sometimes used for the gabbai, the caretaker or "man of all work", in a synagogue. Moishe the Beadle, the caretaker of a synagogue in Sighet in the 1940s, is an important character in Night by Elie Wiesel.

The equivalent in French catholic churches, however now obsolete, is bedeau, which shares a common etymology with beadle.

== In education ==
=== Post-secondary ===
In the medieval universities, beadles were students chosen by instructors to act as assistants: carrying books, taking attendance, and assisting in classroom management.

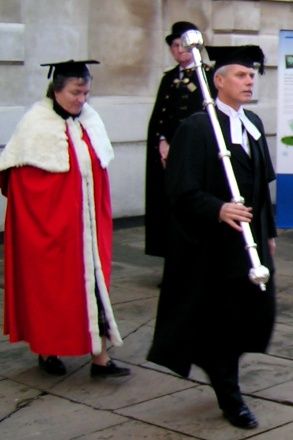
The Esquire Bedell of the University of Cambridge, carrying one of the university maces

In some universities in England, the post of bedel or esquire bedell still exists as a ceremonial role. At the University of Oxford, there are six bedels whose role is defined as being to "attend upon the Chancellor, Vice-Chancellor, the Proctors and other participating dignitaries on such occasions, and assist them and other University members to carry out ceremonial duties" and to "deputise for the University Verger as necessary". At the University of Cambridge there are two esquire bedells who "have certain important responsibilities at congregations", including carrying the university's ceremonial maces, the senior esquire bedell also having "general responsibility for the correct formulation and wearing of academical dress". At Durham University there are two bedels whose roles are to lead the graduand and academic processions carrying the university mace and Durham Cathedral's verge, and to direct students and honorary graduates at graduation and matriculation ceremonies. The University of London has an esquire bedell who carries the mace, as well as additional bedells who carry wands (poles with the university's coat of arms at the top) and have the responsibility for controlling the line of graduates. Bedels are also used at Newcastle University and the University of Bath, where they bear the university mace at graduation ceremonies, and at Keele University, where they bear a ceremonial baton and are accompanied by a mace bearer.

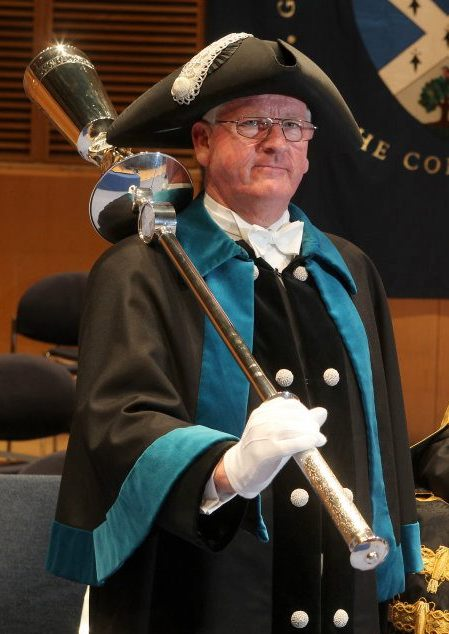
The Ceremonial Bedellus of Glasgow Caledonian University carrying the university's ceremonial mace

Some universities in Scotland, including the University of St Andrews, the University of Glasgow and the University of Dundee, have a ceremonial bedellus, who may also be the head janitor and be responsible for the maintenance of the university buildings. The bedellus traditionally carries or leads the mace in procession and may also be responsible for hooding graduates.

Some Commonwealth and US universities also have beadles in ceremonial roles, under a variety of different spellings. These include the bedel at Emory University, who is traditionally the president of the Student Government Association, the esquire or madam bedel at the University of Canterbury, the bedel at McMaster University, the esquire bedel at the Australian National University, the esquire bedell at the University of New England, and the beadle at the University of Queensland.

At some Dutch universities, including the Vrije Universiteit Amsterdam, University of Amsterdam, and Utrecht University, the Office of the Beadle manages doctoral and other ceremonies. They may mark the end of the question period by announcing the Latin phrases "Hora est!" or "Hora finita!"

=== Secondary ===
Jesuit secondary schools formerly maintained the post of beadle—some still do. In each classroom, a student designated as beadle reports attendance to the teacher, acts as messenger, assists in distributing materials, and leads the class in activities.

The position of Beadle also exists at the King's School, Canterbury, where the beadle's task is making sure that pupils are dressed correctly and arrive at lessons on time.

== Civic and other uses ==
Outside of religious and educational institutions, the designation of "beadle" is most often held by officers of secular bodies of some antiquity.

=== City of London ===
In the City of London the title is held by two distinct groups; both originated as "executors" or police for more senior persons.

==== Ward beadles ====
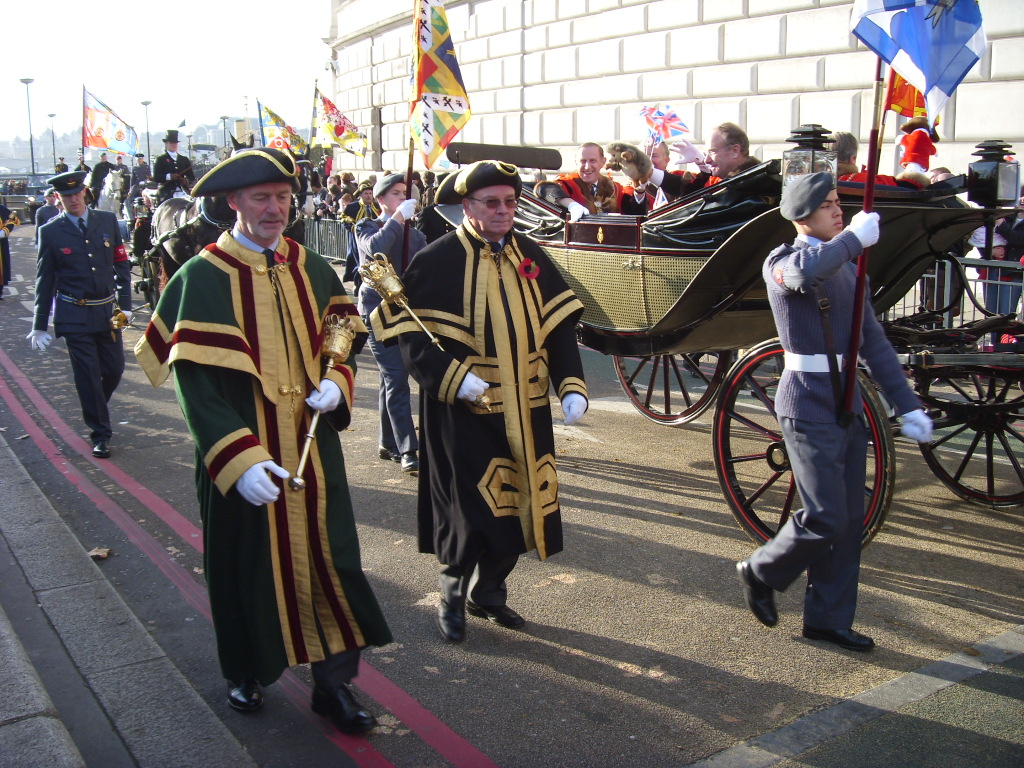
Ward beadles escorting their Aldermen at the Lord Mayor's Show.

The first group are the ward beadles, who hold the oldest elected office in the City (as functionaries, not as representatives) in their wards. Their duties today are largely ceremonial in that they accompany the aldermen in the eight major ceremonies of the civic calendar and open and close the wardmotes (the election meetings for members of the City's courts of Aldermen and Common Council). Previously (as described in the 15th-century Liber Albus) they were also responsible for preparing the register of the Freemen of their Wards, summoning them to the wardmotes and folk-motes [i.e. Common Hall], and administering fines for non-attendance. Elections in the City today are organised by specialist professionals and fines are no longer levied in this way.

==== Livery companies ====
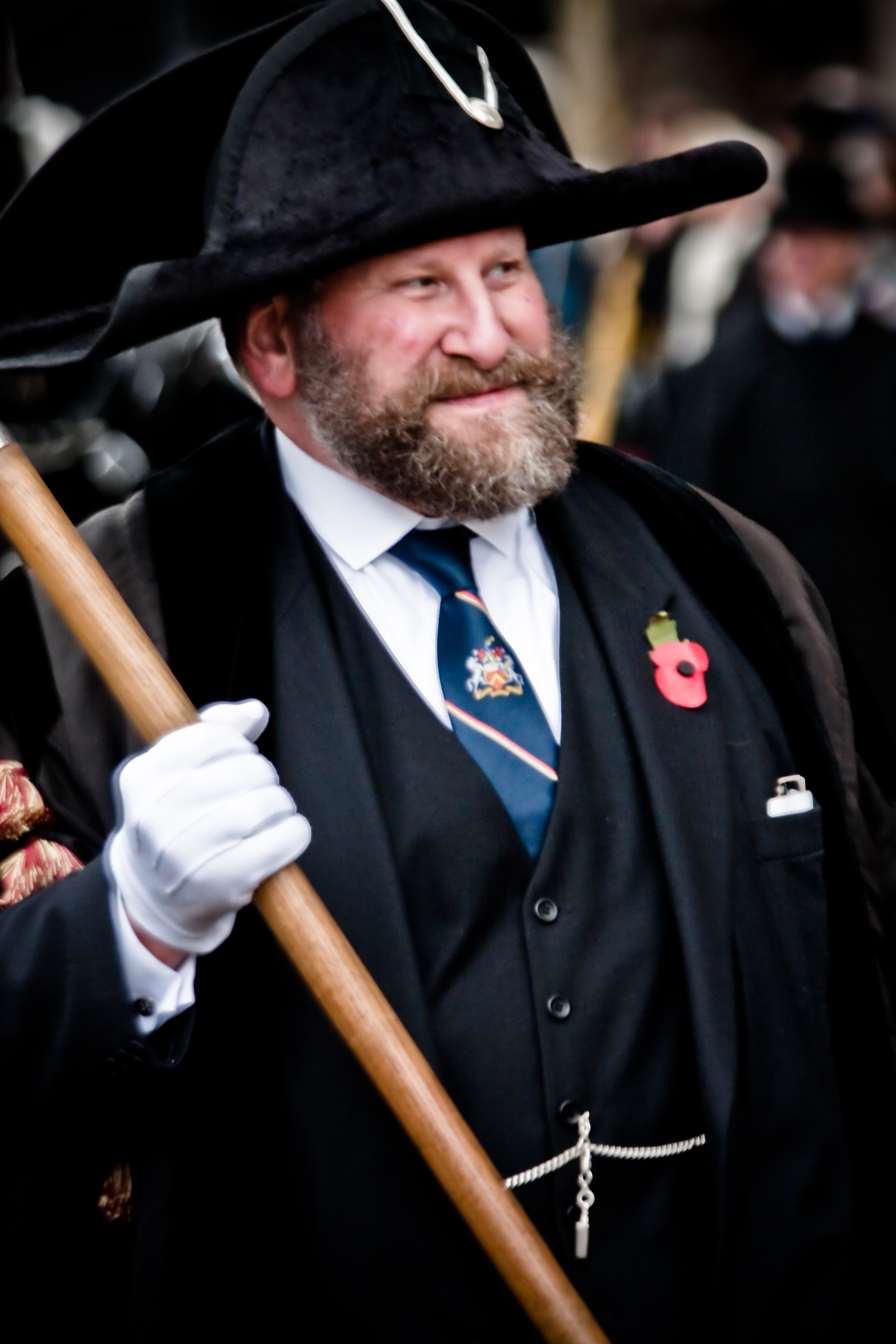
A Livery Company beadle.

The second group are paid employees of the livery companies of the City. These beadles are usually assistants to the company's clerk, being responsible for attendance on the court and master of the company, originally to enforce its trade policy and uphold discipline (especially among the company's apprentices) but now to act as masters-of-ceremony at formal banquets and to accompany the master on civic occasions. The title "hall beadle" is sometimes used by the hall manager of a livery hall responsible for the company's treasure and the efficient running of the hall, especially if let on a commercial basis.

=== Elsewhere ===
The Company of Cutlers in Hallamshire employs a beadle to perform ceremonial duties.

Sometimes the title is used by uniformed security guards. For example, security duties at the Burlington Arcade, an upmarket shopping mall in Piccadilly, London, are carried out by staff called beadles wearing what appear to be nineteenth century uniforms. The beadles enforce the bylaws of the Arcade, which (among other things) forbid singing, running and carrying large parcels or open umbrellas. At one time the beadles were all old soldiers of the 10th Hussars (the regiment of Lord Chesham, the sometime owner of the Arcade).
