= Richard Plunkett (beadle) =

London law officer, 1788–1832

Richard Plunkett (1788–1832) was a Parish Officer of the Law, variously described as a headborough, beadle or night-constable, in Whitechapel, in the East End of London, between 1817 and 1826. His duties were centred upon the Whitechapel watch-house, from which he and his watchmen had to deal with nocturnal criminality in an area of rapidly increasing population, crowded conditions with poor sanitation, and much urban poverty and squalor. Plunkett's term of office just preceded the Metropolitan Police Act 1829, by which a new system of policing was introduced. Plunkett was often called upon to give evidence at the Old Bailey, the cases being scheduled for hearings two or three times a year. His testimony and that of his officers in these more serious cases show his relations with the population at large, his investigations, pursuits and arrests, often based on personal knowledge of the offenders. The majority of these cases resulted in convictions leading to penal transportation. His work illustrates the real activities of the parish police of Whitechapel just over a decade before the writing of Oliver Twist.

== Background and family ==
Richard Plunkett was born, lived and died in Whitechapel. He was a son of Luke Plunkett and Margaret Read, who were married at Christ Church, Spitalfields in January 1772. From various different homes in the neighbourhood, Luke and Margaret christened their children at St Mary Matfelon, Whitechapel between 1776 (as of Bell Yard) and 1790 (as of Rosemary Lane, now Royal Mint Street). Richard was christened in April 1788 as of George Yard in Gunthorpe Street.

Not much is known about Richard's childhood, but in February 1808, at Christchurch Spitalfields, he married Ann Haffner, the middle of three daughters of Thomas Haffner and his wife Elizabeth Hunt. Haffner lived at No. 2 Union Court, Fashion Street, and Richard Plunkett and his wife lived at No. 3 soon after their marriage. Fashion Street was just north of Keate Street and Thrawl Street, between Brick Lane and Commercial Street. Plunkett was at that time clerk of a benefit society based at the Black Dog Inn in Church Street, Bethnal Green, under management of Mr Stokes: Haffner, a member of the society, made Plunkett sole executor of his will (dividing his property between his three daughters), proved in June 1811. Richard and Ann had four children, Richard James (1810), William (1812), Ann (1815) and Caroline (1817), all of whom were christened at St Mary's and survived infancy. Between 1812 and 1817 they were resident in Fieldgate Street, south of the Whitechapel Road.

In the same period his sister Mary had her own family. She married William Crowder, a stationer-bookbinder of Stepney, at Christ Church Spitalfields in May 1810, and their first two daughters were christened from an address on London Wall. The next two, Elizabeth (1815) and Sarah (1817), were christened at St Mary Whitechapel as from Fieldgate Street; later children were christened at the newly-rebuilt St Dunstan-in-the-East, as from Mile End Old Town, or from Ratcliff. All lived to be married.

== Plunkett's early cases ==
1817 seems to mark the completion of Richard's family-making intentions for the time being, and his first appearance as 'constable of the night' at the Old Bailey relates to an incident just a month before his youngest daughter's christening. As he stood at the corner of Whitechapel church a 19-year-old man ran past an unemployed servant-girl and snatched the shawl (value 2 shillings) from her shoulders. Plunkett took him in charge, and the miscreant got 7 years' transportation.

As keeper of the watch-house Plunkett received whatever prisoners the watchmen brought in, and a charge of grand larceny, with the same sentence, was successfully laid against Robert Miles the following April, when apprehended by two watchmen with a quantity of linen stolen from a carrier's wagon. A month later Plunkett made his own arrest of a carpenter's lad carrying home a plank of wood from his workplace at 3.30 a.m. Searching the house, Plunkett found two doors which he had also taken. Here a verdict of Not Guilty was returned, the master having made no complaint.

But in September 1818, following the wholesale theft of provisions (casks of butter and honey and a sackful of hams) from a warehouse in Goodman's Fields (an area around Leman Street and Alie Street), Plunkett, having taken one of the thieves prisoner, got information and went to his residence, where he recovered the goods from the man's wife and mother. About the same time a 15-year-old boy who had stolen a tablecloth and 11 shillings in copper coins from his master, proprietor of an eating-house in Wentworth Street, was made by his father to give himself up to Plunkett. Both criminals were transported for 7 years.

In a classic sting two years later, a young woman invited a printer of Coleman Street, who frequented Whitechapel, back to her house. When he had got into bed and put his pocket watch under the pillow, she extinguished the light and ran off, and two people came in and ordered him out of the house. Missing his watch the man made Plunkett arrest the girl, but nothing was found. In court Plunkett said he thought the complainant was drunk, and remarked that the man had accused him of stealing a pound from him when held in charge two nights previously for drunkenness. The girl was found Not Guilty.

By contrast, in November 1820, a man was invited in by a girl in George Yard, Wentworth Street: once he had paid her something to fetch gin, first the women and then the men of the house robbed his money and possessions and forcibly ejected him, padlocking the door. The man called an officer, who arrested one of the girls (aged 17). Further complaint was made to Plunkett, who (having been born in George Yard) knew the man responsible and arrested him. Both were transported for life.

== A dangerous occupation ==
Soon afterwards, on 16 January 1821, Plunkett faced a personal challenge. Now living at No. 5 Baker's Row (on the north side of Whitechapel High Street, just east of the Workhouse: now Vallance Road), his two sons usually closed the outer shutters of the windows on their return from school, but were delayed. Soon after 5 pm, while taking tea in his back room, he heard a noise and found that two men had broken into his house via the front window, and were moving about in the dark. Discovered, one jumped onto a table and out through the upper part of the sash. The other followed, his gaiter slipping from Plunkett's grasp. But Plunkett jumped after him, caught him, and gave him into charge of George Brock, who was standing by.

He then chased the other, whom he recognised, up Baker's Row and round the corner into Church Street, where the man appeared nonchalantly in the doorway of a public house. A fight ensued, and Plunkett took him. The two were found guilty of burglary and sentenced to death, but a special verdict was returned pending a decision as to whether the window had been secured. (This case established that the pulling down of the sash of a window, though unfastened, constituted a breaking within the definition of "breaking and entering".) William Haynes and William Harrison were transported for life on the second convict voyage of the Asia on 1 April 1822.

Mary Crowder, Plunkett's sister, also found herself in the Old Bailey in the winter of 1820–21. She was still living at Greenfield Street, and in mid-February her lodger, who had been with her since mid-December, disappeared owing her 24 shillings. Some spoons and a pair of ear-rings went missing at the same time. She had not threatened to arrest him for the money owing: the apparent theft came to court, but was not proved against the defendant.

In June 1821 Plunkett testified in two cases of pocket-picking, one of which had taken him back to George Yard. In September two women who had accosted a man walking home at 2 a.m. and had taken 27 shillings from him were sentenced to transportation for life. A year later Plunkett and his colleague John Clark went after two women known to them who were accused of stealing a coat and 35 sovereigns from a retired excise-officer in the street, but although the coat was found the court had doubt of their guilt. On the same day he gave evidence in a case of street robbery (classed as highway robbery with violence, though the work of a footpad) which led to a death sentence. Between December 1822 (when on one occasion he held an identification parade) and February 1825 Plunkett testified in nine other serious cases, mostly resulting in transportation.

== His last cases, and retirement ==
It happened that near to his house in Baker's Row stood the premises of Messrs. Brocks Fireworks factory. On 4 September 1825 two boys were engaged in ramming gunpowder into squibs when a spark ignited and the boys ran out in fright, throwing the firework aside. Fifty pounds of gunpowder and a large amount of saltpetre suddenly exploded, blowing the roof off, setting fire to the building, and smashing every pane of glass in most of the adjoining streets. "Females were frightened into hysterics" (runs the report), but the only serious injury was to Richard Plunkett's sister.

In November 1825 a respectable lady, Mrs Byrne, stopped at a house in Leman Street and remonstrated with the owner, an undertaker, who was beating his wife. The man then produced a constable's baton and had Mrs Byrne sent to the watch-house as a common prostitute. Plunkett kept her there for two hours among some rough company, and was about to lock her in a cell when her husband and brother arrived to rescue her. She was vindicated in court, severe criticism was levelled against the watch-houses, and the wife-beating constable was arrested and charged.

In the same week a respectable-looking young man was found lying drunk on Whitechapel Road. The watchman took him to the watch-house to sleep it off, but when Plunkett looked in on him at about 4 a.m. he found him weltering in blood, having stabbed himself in the neck with a penknife. With immediate attention he was able to explain that he wished to end his life, and when further recovered was sent home in a cab under medical supervision.

These events doubtless contributed to Plunkett's retirement as beadle, and the evidence he gave leading to two further convictions in 1826 are his last recorded in the Proceedings of the Old Bailey. At the time of the firework explosion his occupation is given as "writing ink maker", and in that capacity he took out insurance in December 1825. By March 1827 he had become the publican of the Green Man in Castle Street, Whitechapel. He was buried as from Castle Street at St Mary's Whitechapel on 10 June 1832, aged 44, perhaps a victim of the cholera epidemic. At her marriage in 1838 his daughter Ann recorded her late father's occupation as "publican".
