= The Blind Beggar =

Historic London pub

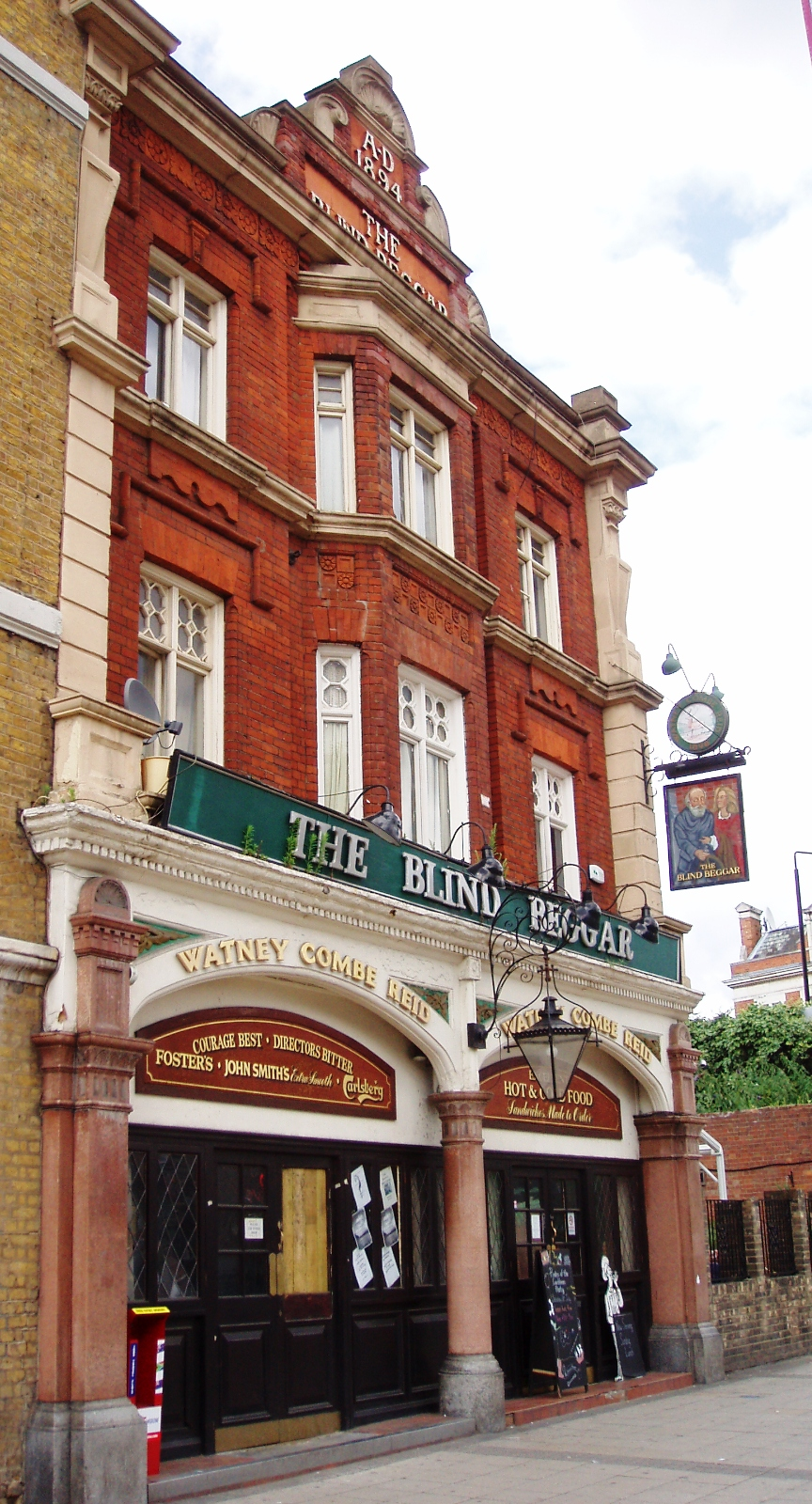
- The Blind Beggar in 2008

- Location within East London
- Interactive map of the The Blind Beggar area

General information
- Location: 337 Whitechapel Road, London E1 1BU
- Coordinates: 51°31′12″N 0°03′25″W
- Opened: 1894

Website
- theblindbeggar.com

The Blind Beggar is a pub in Whitechapel Road in the East End of London, England, at the junction with Cambridge Heath Road.

Owing to its location close to Whitechapel Station, the pub is often described as being in Whitechapel. Strictly speaking, however, it stands just on the Bethnal Green side of the historic boundary between Bethnal Green and Whitechapel.

The pub takes its name from the ballad and legend The Blind Beggar of Bethnal Green. The pub is reputed to be built on the site on which the blind beggar begged.

It is where Ronnie Kray murdered George Cornell in front of witnesses. It is also the location of William Booth's first sermon, which led to the creation of the Salvation Army. It was the nearest outlet (or brewery tap) for the Manns Albion brewery, where the first modern brown ale was brewed. The pub was built in 1894 on the site of an inn which had been established before 1654.

== History ==
The pub was built in 1894 on the site of an inn which had been established before 1654, and named after the famous ballad.

In 1865, William Booth preached his first open-air sermon outside the Blind Beggar, which led to the establishment of the East London Christian Mission, later to become the Salvation Army. William Booth is commemorated by a nearby statue.

The Blind Beggar is notorious for its connection to East End gangsters the Kray twins. On 9 March 1966, Ronnie Kray shot and murdered George Cornell, an associate of a rival gang, the Richardsons, as he was sitting at the bar. The murder took place in the then saloon bar.

The pub is also a popular starting point for the Monopoly pub crawl, despite being located on the board's third space.

The pub was frequented by Harry Redknapp and was at one stage owned by Bobby Moore.

== Henry de Montfort legend ==
The pub takes its name from the ballad and legend The Blind Beggar of Bethnal Green. It stands at the junction of the Whitechapel Road (part of the route from the Aldgate to Colchester later known as the Great Essex Road) and Cambridge Heath Road, and is reputed to be on the site of the beggar's activities. In some versions of the ballad, the beggar was an impoverished noble, Henry de Montfort.

In the legend, de Montfort was wounded and lost his sight in the Battle of Evesham in 1265. He was nursed to health by a baroness, and together they had a child named Besse. He became the "Blind Beggar of Bethnal Green" and used to beg at the crossroads. The story of how he went from landed gentry to poor beggar became popular in the Tudor era, and was revived by Thomas Percy's Reliques of Ancient English Poetry, published in 1765. In 1900, the legend was depicted on the seal of the Metropolitan Borough of Bethnal Green.
