= East London Mosque =

Mosque in United Kingdom

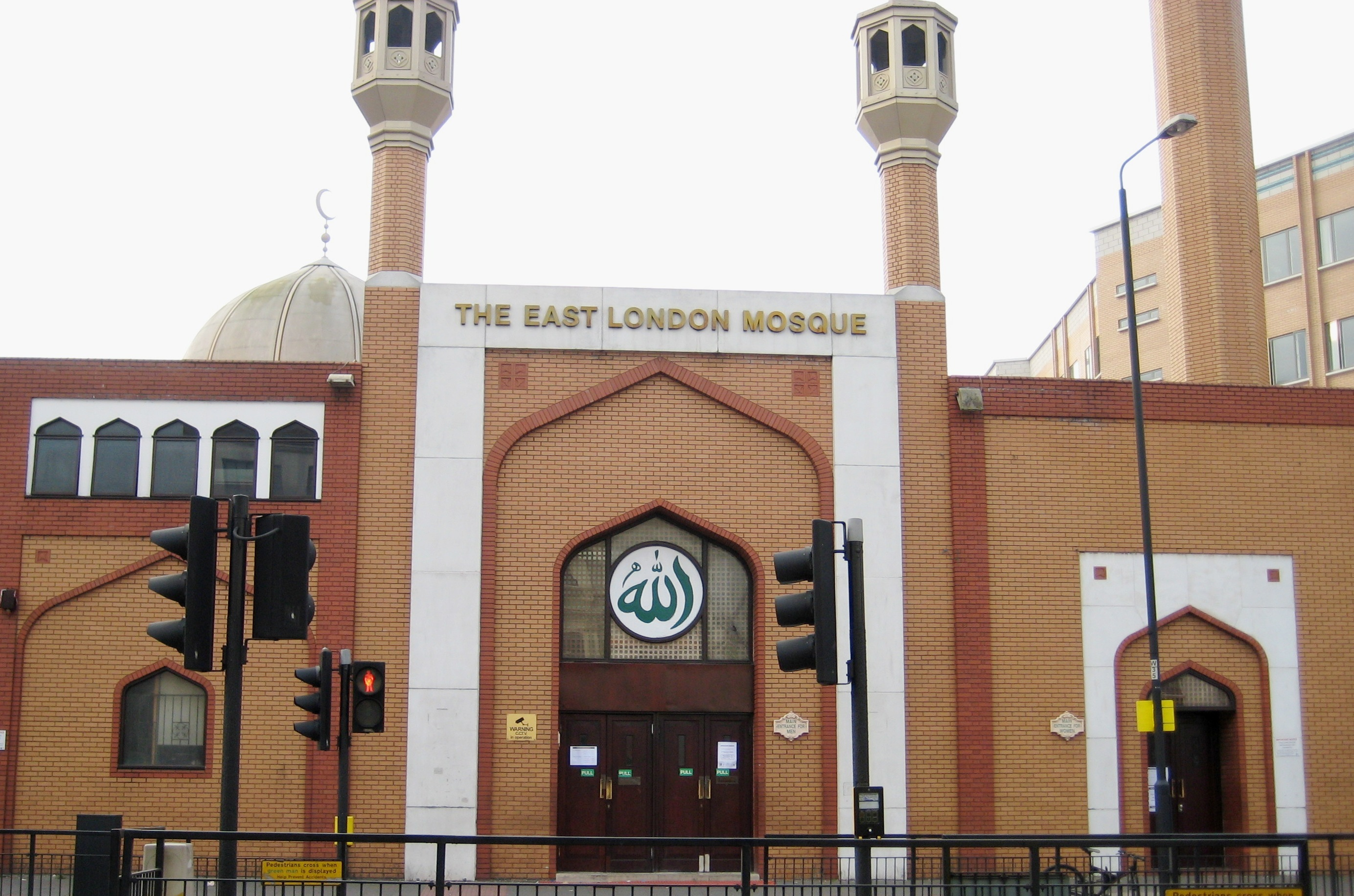

Religion
- Affiliation: Sunni Islam
- Leadership: Head Imam: Abdul Qayum; CEO: Junaid Ahmed; Chairman: Abdul-Hayee Murshad
- Year consecrated: 1985
- Status: active

Location
- Location: Whitechapel, Tower Hamlets, London, England
- State: England
- Interactive map of East London Mosque
- Coordinates: 51.5176°N 0.0656°W

Architecture
- Architects: Webb Gray Ltd (2011–2015); Studio Klaschka Ltd (2007–2010); Markland Klaschka Limited (2002–2004); John Gill Associates (1982–1985)
- Type: Mosque
- Style: Islamic architecture
- Construction cost: £22.3 million (including complex)

Specifications
- Capacity: 7,000
- Dome: 1
- Minaret: 3

Website
- eastlondonmosque.org.uk

The East London Mosque (ELM) is situated in the London Borough of Tower Hamlets between Whitechapel and Aldgate East. Combined with the adjoining London Muslim Centre and Maryam Centre, it is one of the largest mosques in Western Europe accommodating more than 7,000 worshippers for congregational prayers. The mosque was one of the first in the UK to be allowed to use loudspeakers to broadcast the adhan.

== Building details ==
Construction of the three-storey East London Mosque began in 1982 on land left empty after bombing during World War II, and was completed in 1985. The architect was John Gill Associates. The exterior is a distinctive brick pattern in two colours, with the front facing Whitechapel Road and the rear on Fieldgate Street. The mosque is capped with a golden dome of about 8.5m diameter. The minaret rises to about 28.5m above ground level, and the main entrance is finished with two smaller copies of the minaret. The mosque has two large halls, a gallery, classrooms, offices and a retail unit.

Construction for phase 1 of the mosque's expansion, called the London Muslim Centre, began in 2002 and was completed in 2004. Adjoining and connected to the mosque, it is a six-storey building with a prominent entrance featuring a sweeping mosaic pattern. The centre has two multipurpose halls, a seminar suite, a nursery, classrooms, a fitness centre, a small Islamic library, a radio station, retail units and offices. It was designed by Markland Klaschka Limited.

In 2009 phase 2 commenced, a nine-storey addition on the Fieldgate Street side to be known as the Maryam Centre, on a site originally used by the mosque's funeral services, designed by the same architect. The Maryam Centre opened to the public on 4 July 2013, adding a new main prayer hall, improved funeral services, a visitor centre, and over five floors of facilities for women including prayer spaces, education facilities, a fitness centre, and support services.

== History ==
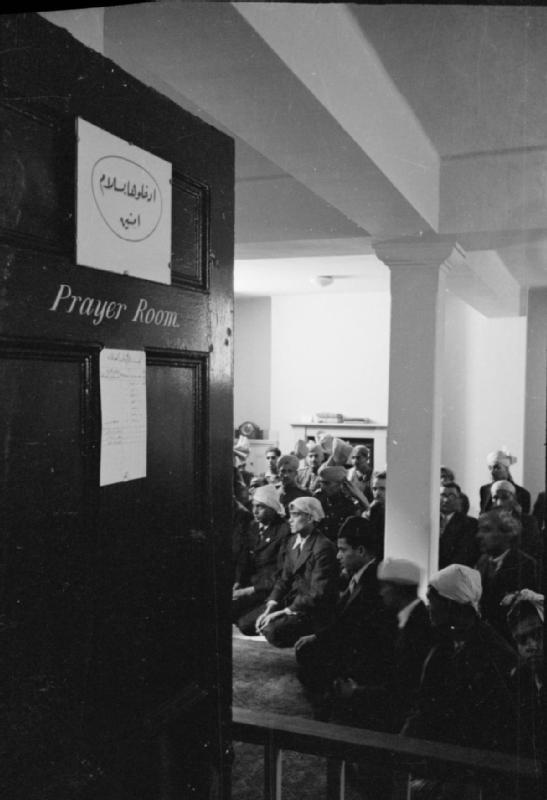
The prayer room of the original East London Mosque during the Eid ul Fitr celebrations in 1941

=== 1910–1939: The London Mosque Fund ===
At the beginning of the 20th century, London was the capital of the extensive British Empire, which contained many millions of Muslims, but had no mosque for Muslim residents or visitors. On 9 November 1910, at a meeting of Muslims and non-Muslims at the Ritz Hotel, the London Mosque Fund was established with the aims of organising weekly Friday prayers and providing a permanent place of worship for Muslims in London.

People associated with the London Mosque Fund over the years include:

- Syed Ameer Ali, the first Indian Privy Counsellor, was the Chairman of the Fund's executive committee until his death in 1928
- Sir Hassan Suhrawardy also served as the Chairman of the executive committee
- The Aga Khan III served as life president of the board of trustees
- Both Abdullah Yusuf Ali and Mohammed Marmaduke Pickthall, translators of the Quran, were trustees of the Fund
- Nathan Rothschild served as a trustee
- Lord Lamington became Vice-Chairman
- Historian T. W. Arnold became its secretary, and was later replaced by Sir Ernest Houston
- Sir John Woodhead became its treasurer
- The Earl Winterton was also a trustee of the Fund

=== 1940–1974: The original East London Mosque ===
From 1910 to 1940 various rooms had been hired for Jumu'ah prayers on Fridays. Finally, in 1940, three houses were purchased at 446–448 Commercial Road in the east end of London as a permanent place of prayer. On 2 August 1941 the combined houses were inaugurated as the 'East London Mosque and Islamic Culture Centre' at a ceremony attended by the Egyptian Ambassador, Colonel Sir Gordon Neal (representing the Secretary of State for India). The first prayer was led by the Ambassador for Saudi Arabia, Shaikh Hafiz Wahba. The number of East Pakistanis in Britain, one of the largest Muslim ethnic groups in the country, rose from 2,000 in 1951 to 6,000 in 1961. The increase was due mainly to immigration from the small towns of Sylhet division, in what became Bangladesh in 1971. During the 1970s, the Bangladeshi-origin population in Britain grew from 22,000 to 65,000.

=== 1975–1984: Preparing for a purpose-built mosque ===
In 1975 the local authority bought the properties in Commercial Road under a compulsory purchase order, in return providing a site with temporary buildings on Whitechapel Road next to the Fieldgate Street Great Synagogue. The local community set about raising funds to erect a purpose-built mosque on the site. King Fahd of Saudi Arabia donated £1.1 million of the £2 million fund, and the governments of Kuwait and Britain also donated to the fund. Seven years later, the building of the new mosque commenced, with foundations laid in 1982 and construction completed in 1985.

=== 1985–2000: The new East London Mosque ===
It was one of the first mosques in the United Kingdom to broadcast the adhan (call to prayer) from the minaret using loudspeakers. Some local non-Muslim residents protested it as noise pollution, leading to coverage by the Daily Mail and the Daily Star; in response, local Church of England clerics gave their support for the adhan in a letter to the East London Advertiser. It had a capacity of 2,000, with prayer areas for men and women, and classroom space for supplementary education. However, by the 1990s the capacity was already insufficient for the growing congregation and for the range of projects based there. The land next to the mosque had been left vacant after bomb damage during World War II, and was used as a car park. Under the leadership of chairman Haji Akbor Ali, the mosque launched a campaign to buy the land; the purchase was completed in 1999.

=== 2001–2008: The London Muslim Centre ===
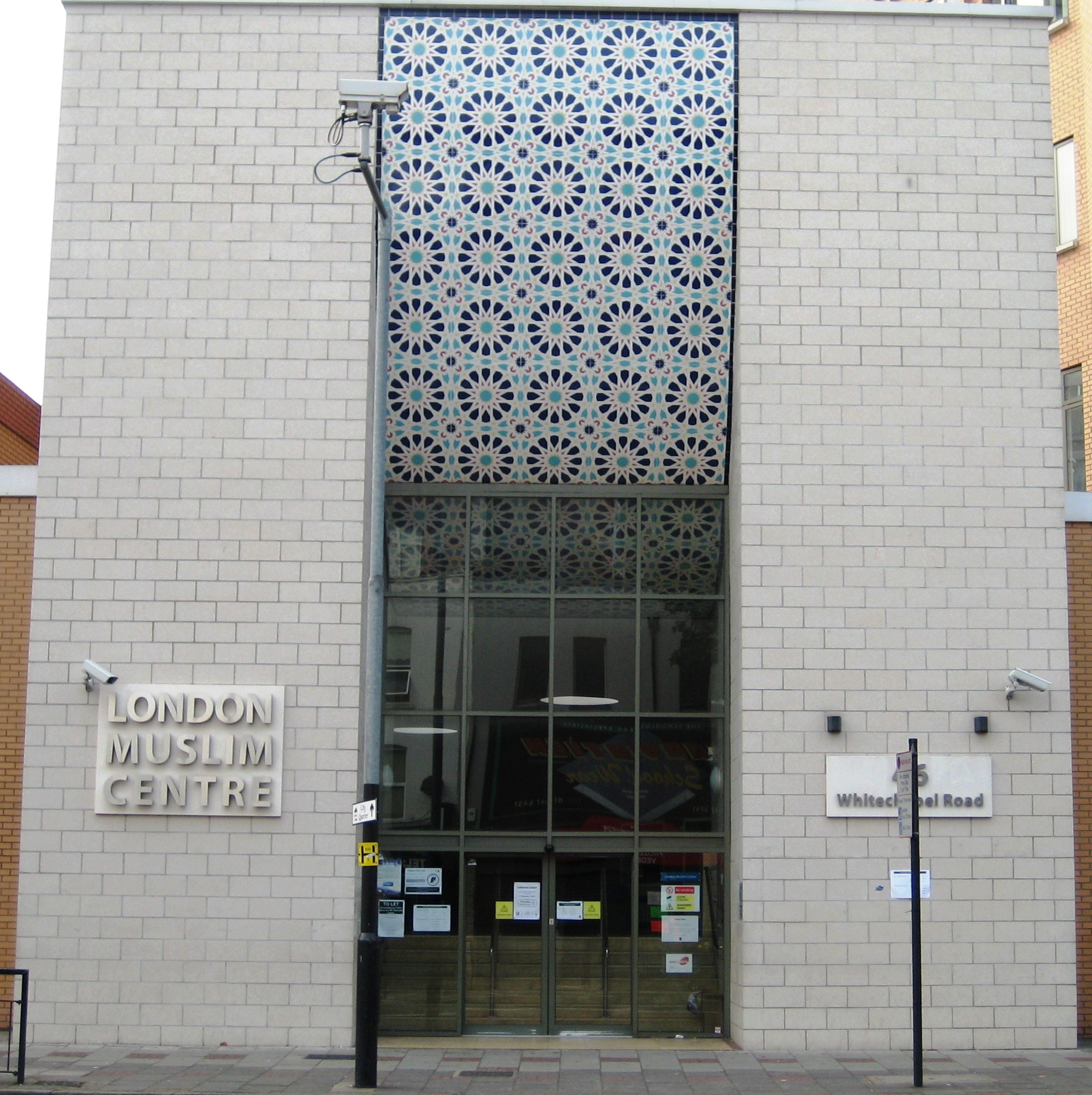
London Muslim Centre front entrance

In 2001 Prince Charles launched the project to build the London Muslim Centre (LMC). Construction began in 2002, and the new centre opened on 11 June 2004, with over 15,000 people attending the opening prayers. The prayer capacity of the mosque and centre rose to about 5,000, with a greatly increased range of services. The building cost £10.4 million, funding was provided by the London Development Agency, European Development Fund, London Borough of Tower Hamlets and Sure Start. Around £4 million was donated by members of the public.

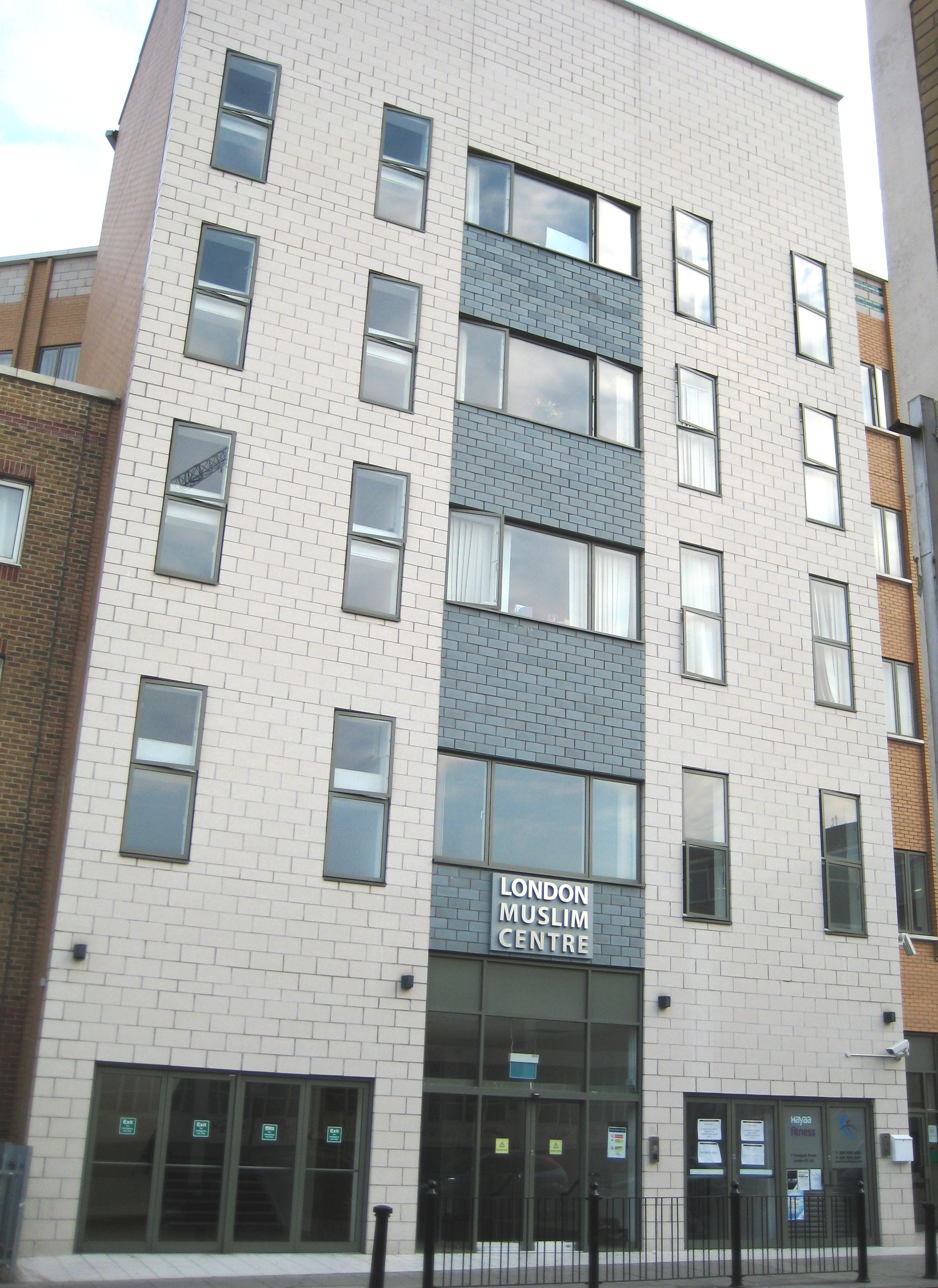
London Muslim centre rear view

On the opening day Sheikh Abdur Rahman Al-Sudais, Imam of the Great Mosque of Mecca, led the Friday prayer. Amongst the guests were Racial Equality Minister Fiona Mactaggart, the chair of the Equality and Human Rights Commission Trevor Phillips and senior officials from the Muslim Council of Britain. Prince Charles, who was in Washington for the funeral of former US president Ronald Reagan, sent a video message of support.

In July 2004 the Malaysian prime minister, Abdullah Ahmad Badawi, visited the mosque and centre.

In November 2004 Prince Charles returned to see the centre. The following month Elizabeth II featured excerpts of his visit in her Christmas message.

Following the 7 July 2005 London bombings, on 22 July, the mosque was evacuated due to a bomb hoax. The hoax was blamed on extremist Muslims after it condemned the 7/7 bombings and opposed extremist teaching.

In July 2008 the Lord Chief Justice, Lord Phillips, delivered a speech on "Equality Before The Law" at an event highlighting the pro bono legal service at the LMC.

In October 2008 the East London Mosque and London Muslim Centre won Islam Channel's Super Model Mosque award presented at the Global Peace and Unity event at the Excel Centre.

In December 2008 the East London Mosque planned to allow Noor Pro Media to hold a conference on 1 January 2009 which would include a videotaped lecture by Anwar al-Awlaki. Former Shadow Home Secretary Dominic Grieve expressed concern over al-Awlaki's involvement. A spokesman for the mosque said that "Mr Awlaki has not been proven guilty in a court of law. Everyone is entitled to their point of view", and that "We didn't organise this event, they are just using our facilities." But the controversy brought the mosque management to review and tighten its booking procedures for private hire of facilities by third-party groups; subsequently, publicity materials were to be approved previous to booking mosque space for events. This was accompanied by a strong statement: "The mosque will not tolerate its facilities being used for extremist groups or speakers and is now vetting all speakers and publicity materials." Shortly after, at the end of January 2009 Awlaki published his views on Jihad and more information about him gradually emerged. The mosque then decided to ban all materials from Awlaki; people who had already hired the mosque's facilities for public events and were planning to use Awlaki's materials had to remove said materials from their programme.
Later in 2009, Al-Awlaki expressed support of the Fort Hood murders; the mosque issued a statement condemning his extreme views and renewed that condemnation at the end of 2009 when possible connections to Umar Farouk Abdulmutallab emerged. It also prohibited the sale or distribution of Awlaki materials in the mosque and its centre.

=== From 2009: The Maryam Centre and the neighbouring Synagogue ===
19 Jun 2009: construction began of the mosque's Phase 2 expansion, the 'Maryam Centre'.

4 Mar 2010: hosted 'The BIG Read' organised with IF Charity, Islamic Forum Europe, Muslim Aid, and Tower Hamlets Council, and broke the world record for 'Most children reading with an adult', with 3,234 children listened to readings from Roald Dahl's Charlie and the Chocolate Factory.

5 Mar 2010: hosted the BBC's weekly live topical debate Any Questions?, chaired by Jonathan Dimbleby and with panellists Ken Livingstone (former Mayor of London), Shadow Business Secretary Kenneth Clarke, Mehdi Hasan (senior politics editor at the New Statesman) and Julia Goldsworthy (Liberal Democrat spokesperson on Communities and Local Government).

25 Aug 2010: subject of a BBC documentary, Middle EastEnders, that "chronicles the setbacks and triumphs of an institution which has shaped the identity of a corner of London", timed to anticipate the centenary of the mosque.

4 Sep 2010: the mosque raised over £1.1 million in one night in Ramadan on Channel S, breaking the record for ethnic television for the third year in a row, in an appeal for the building of their Phase 2 expansion.

24 Jun 2011: first beehive installed on roof of London Muslim Centre.

3 Sep 2011: the English Defence League (EDL) wanted to march past the mosque, but after widespread opposition were prevented by a ban imposed by Home Secretary Theresa May. The EDL instead held a static demonstration in Aldgate, and were stopped by police from entering Tower Hamlets, whilst a larger 'United East End' counter-demonstration was held by an alliance of groups and organisations.

20 Jan 2012: the president of the International Court of Justice, Hisashi Owada, delivered the keynote speech at Evolving World at the London Muslim Centre.

4 Jul 2013: the Maryam Centre opens to the public, increasing the capacity for prayers to over 7,000 people.

28 Oct 2013: the president of Bosnia and Herzegovina, Bakir Izetbegović visited the Mosque and Centre for an evening dinner reception. He delivered a key note speech to guests and dignitaries in attendance.

15 Jan 2015: launch of Britain's first ever Muslim archives in a joint project with The National Archives, with guests Jeff James, CEO of The National Archives, Simon Hughes and Sadiq Khan.

June 2015: Purchase of the Fieldgate Street Great Synagogue

30 Sep 2015: subject of BBC documentary Welcome to the Mosque by filmmaker Robb Leech.

== Management ==
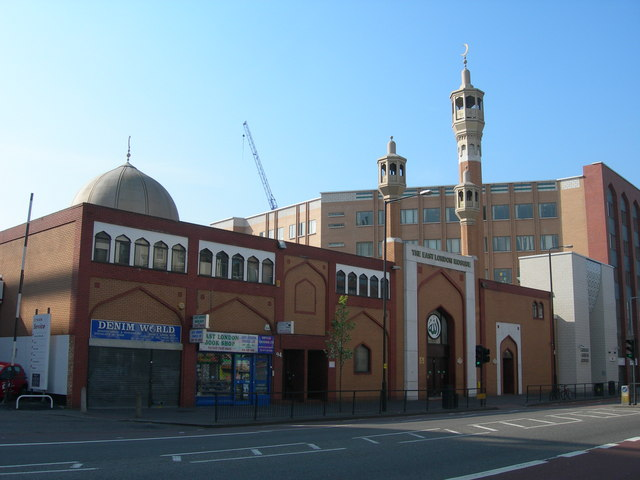
The East London Mosque and London Muslim Centre in their wider setting on Whitechapel Road

The East London Mosque Trust is a registered charity (previously registered as The London Mosque Fund) and a private company (limited by guarantee, no share capital). The mosque is managed by trustees who are elected biennially by its members at the Annual General Meeting. The Director is Dilowar Hussain Khan, The Khatib and Head Imam of the mosque is Abdul Qayum, the CEO is Junaid Ahmed, and the Chairman is Abdul-Hayee Murshad.

In 2025, the Charity Commission warned the Trust of regulatory action for “failing to responsibly manage charity funds" over the loss of £1m on an investment the trust had expected to pay 20% in 6 months, and a repeated lack of appropriate oversight.

== Controversies ==
The mosque is a member of the Tower Hamlets Inter Faith Forum, a founding member of The East London Communities Organisation (TELCO), and an affiliate of the Muslim Council of Britain. The Islamic Forum of Europe (IFE) and the mosque are very closely intertwined, the organisation was created in 1989 by Muslims involved in the running of the East London Mosque. Some of the mosque's practices reflect the Hanafi school of law.

Gay rights campaigners accused the mosque of hosting homophobic speakers, although the mosque had earlier condemned homophobia. In 2014 Oxfam cancelled an event at the mosque after it learned the headline speaker, Ibrahim Hewitt, had written a book in 1994 for GCSE students, What Does Islam Say, calling homosexuality a "great sin" and saying gay people should be "severely punished" under Islamic law.

In July 2017 the mosque and others complained to Pride London about placards displayed in their march by the Council of Ex-Muslims of Britain (CEMB), claiming they were Islamophobic. Gay rights campaigner Peter Tatchell defended the CEMB and criticised the mosque's record on homophobia, writing "In the last two years, I and my colleagues at the Peter Tatchell Foundation have 11 times contacted the mosque and LMC, requesting them to have a dialogue with the LGBT community: to build bridges and solidarity between LGBTs and Muslims to combat the prejudice, discrimination and violence that both communities suffer. All our requests have been rebuffed." In reply, the mosque stated it had met with LGBT groups, and also with Tatchell himself in 2012.

In October 2025, the mosque was criticized for hosting a charity fun run only open to men and girls under the age of 12.

== Prominent visitors ==
Prominent imams and Muslim scholars who have visited the mosque: Abdul Rahman Al-Sudais and Saud Al-Shuraim (imams of Masjid al-Haram), Salah Al Budair (imam of Al-Masjid al-Nabawi and a judge of the High Court of Madina), Adel Salem Al Kalbani (former Imam of Masjid al-Haram), Mustafa Cerić (Grand Mufti of Bosnia), Delwar Hossain Sayeedi (former MP of Bangladesh and one of the leaders of the Jamaat-e-Islami), Ismail ibn Musa Menk (Mufti of Zimbabwe).

British politicians who have visited the mosque: Fiona MacTaggart (former Home Office Minister), Sadiq Khan (Mayor of London), Simon Hughes (former Minister of State for Justice and Civil Liberties) and Boris Johnson (then Mayor of London).

Other visitors include King Charles (then Prince of Wales), Prince William, Abdullah Ahmad Badawi (former Prime Minister of Malaysia), Dzulkefly Ahmad, (Health Minister of Malaysia), Brendan Barber (Secretary General of TUC), Louis Susman (United States Ambassador to the United Kingdom), Sarah Mullally (Church of England, Bishop of London).

== Services ==
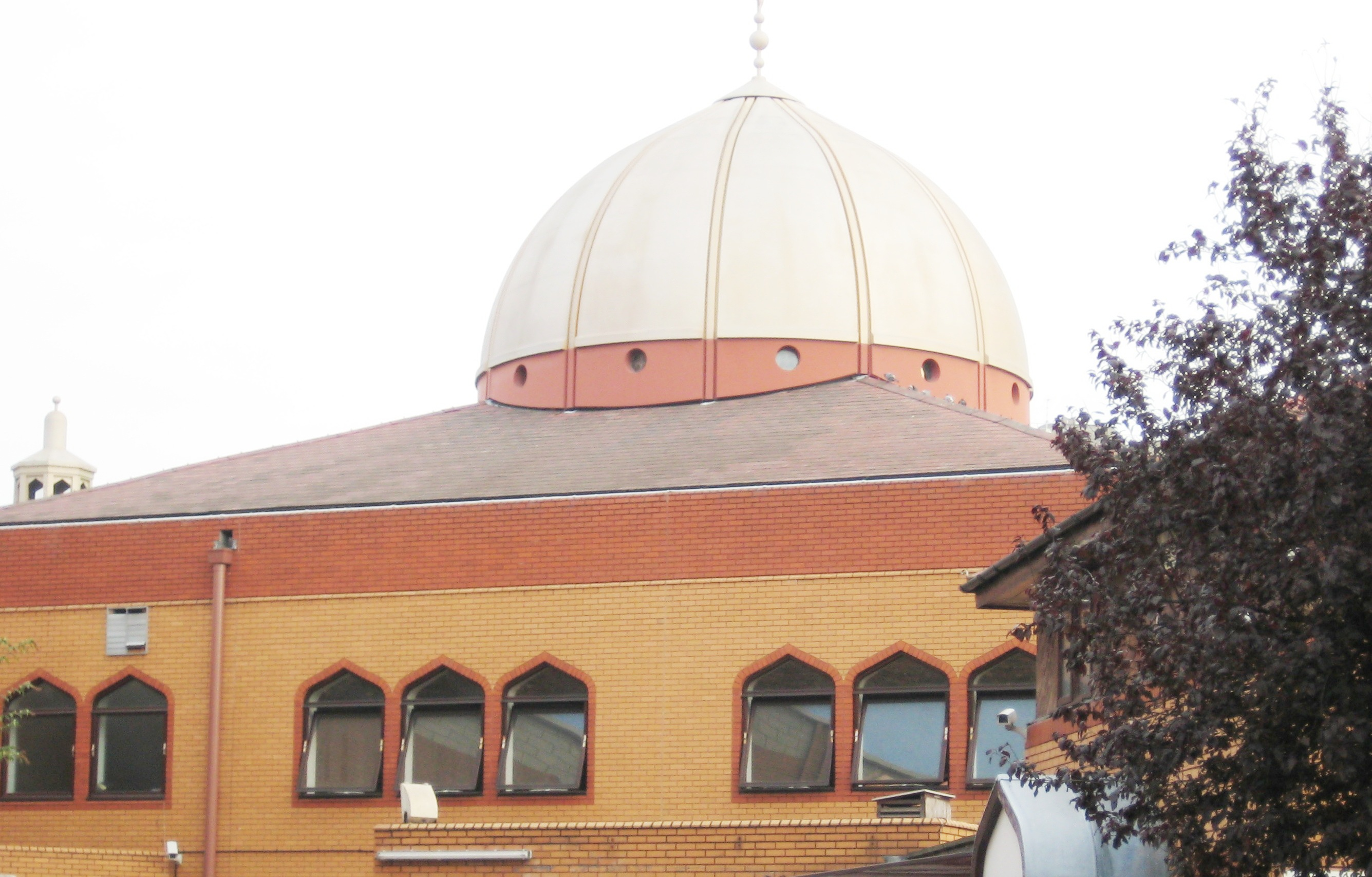
Dome of the mosque viewed from the rear

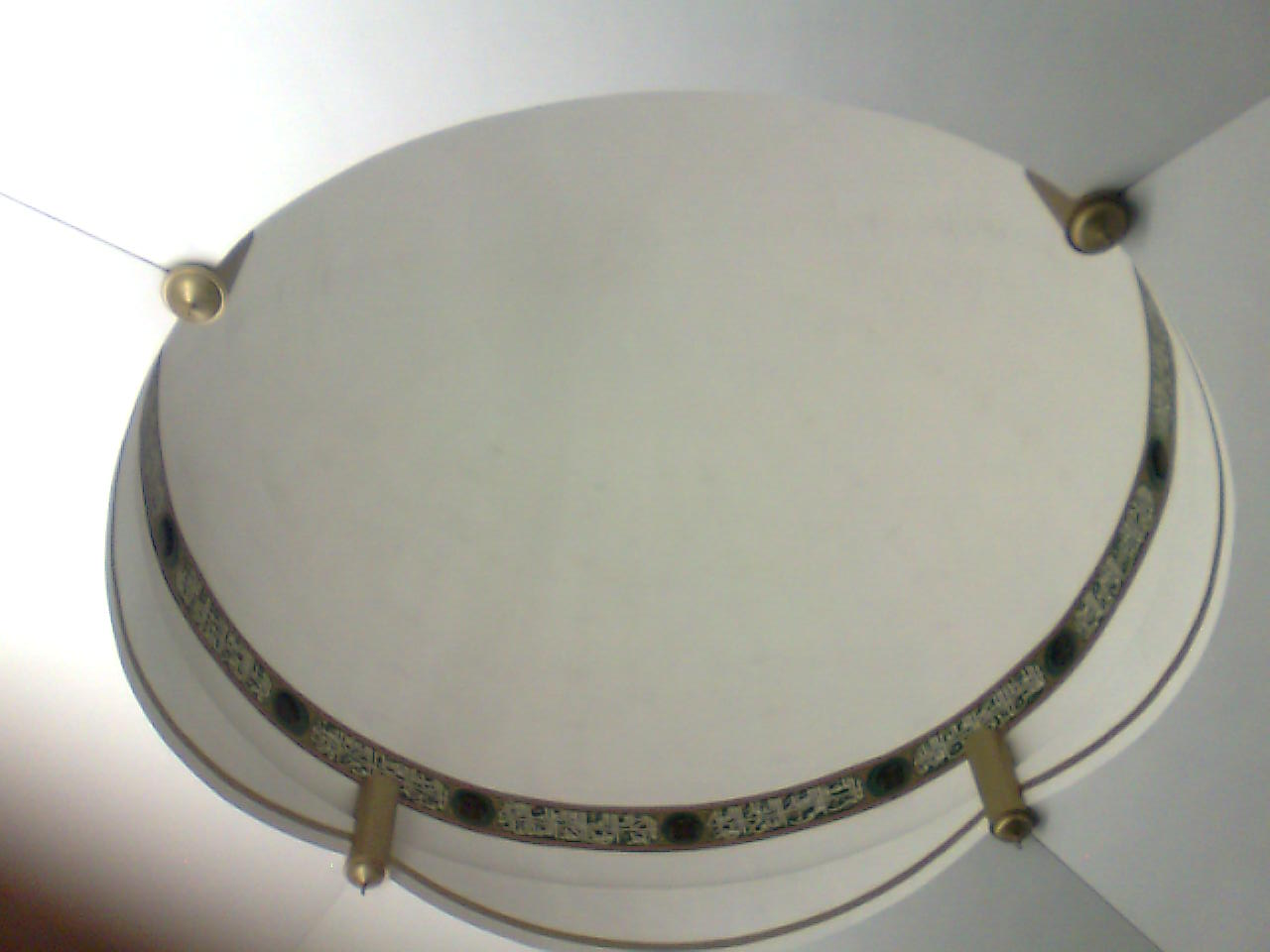
The interior of the dome in the mosque

The mosque has a stated mission to:

"serve, educate and inspire."

— Annual Review 2013–14, East London Mosque Trust

The Friday sermon is delivered in Arabic, Bengali and English.

Services provided to the community include: nursery, primary and secondary schools; supplementary education; library; fitness centres; wedding and conference hire; support for deaf children and adults; ICT Training and English classes; advice and counselling; and exhibitions and open days.

The mosque previously ran Muslim Community Radio (MCR), in partnership with the Islamic Forum of Europe, which started to broadcast in 1998 through an RSL, then through Spectrum. In the month of Ramadan from 2001 to 2013 MCR broadcast 24 hours a day across parts of east London. In 2005 it moved into a new studio in the London Muslim Centre. It was run by volunteers, and provided programmes in English, Bengali and Arabic.

== See also ==
- Islam in London
- Islamic architecture
- Abul A'la Maududi (alternative spelling Maudoodi)
- Jamaat-e-Islami
- Brick Lane Mosque
- British Bangladeshi
- Islamic schools and branches
- Islamism in London
- List of mosques in the United Kingdom
