= Aldgate East tube station =

London Underground station

Aldgate East
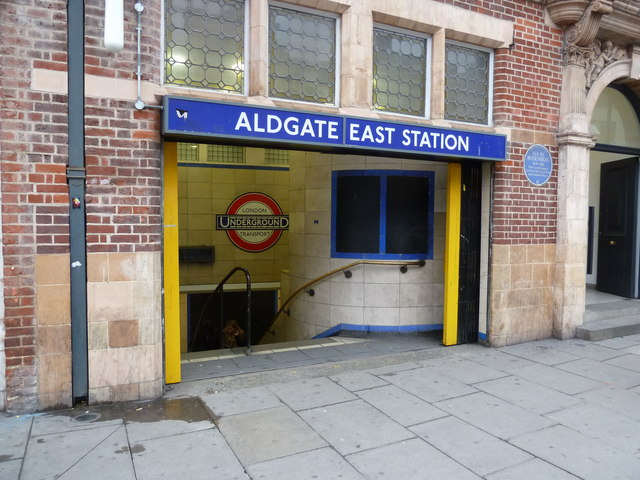
- The northeastern entrance is part of the Whitechapel Gallery building

General information
- Location: Whitechapel, Tower Hamlets
- Coordinates: 51.5152°N 0.0722°W
- Owner: Transport for London
- Manager: London Underground
- Platforms: 2
- Connections: Aldgate

Other information
- Fare zone: 1
- Website: Official website

History
- Opened: 6 October 1884

Key dates
- 31 October 1938: Resited

Passengers

London Underground annual entry and exit
- 2021: ▲5.61 million
- 2022: ▲10.23 million
- 2023: ▲10.95 million
- 2024: ▲11.80 million
- 2025: ▼11.61 million
Location
- Location in Tower Hamlets

Aldgate East (/ˈɔːldɡeɪt ˈiːst/) is a London Underground station located on Whitechapel High Street in the Whitechapel neighbourhood of the London Borough of Tower Hamlets, East London. It is on the District and Hammersmith & City lines, between Whitechapel to the east, and Tower Hill and Liverpool Street to the west. The station was opened on 6 October 1884 on a new route connecting the District Railway and Metropolitan Railway with Whitechapel and the East London Railway. Steam trains were replaced by electric in 1905 and 1906. The station was rebuilt and resited in 1938. It is in London fare zone 1.

== History ==
The original Aldgate East station opened on 6 October 1884. It was located on an eastern spur of the Metropolitan and Metropolitan District Joint Railway, a line that connected the eastern end of the District Railway (DR) at Mansion House to the Metropolitan Railway (the Met) at Aldgate and completed the Circle line. (Note: Authorised as the Metropolitan and District (City Lines and Extensions) Railway and also known as the "City Lines".) During planning for the station, the name "Commercial Road" was considered. The railway through Aldgate East permitted the DR to reach their new eastern terminus at Whitechapel, the DR and the Met to route trains onto the East London Railway (ELR) and for the South Eastern Railway to access the Met via the ELR. DR services were extended eastwards from Whitechapel in 1902. Fourth-rail electric services replaced steam trains run by the DR in 1905 and the Met in 1906.

By 1912 the DR was running eight-car trains that were too long for the platforms. As well as causing problems for passengers alighting from the eighth carriage, DR trains in the eastbound platform could block the points and prevent westbound Met trains from departing. The DR and the Met drew up plans to extend the platforms but could not agree on how to share the costs and no progress was made. In 1914, a larger Harry Wharton Ford-designed station building was opened. The DR and the Met were incorporated into London Transport on 1 July 1933 and became known as the District and Metropolitan lines.

The eastern section of the District line was very overcrowded by the mid-1930s. Capacity was constrained by the flat junctions west of the station. Most Metropolitan line passengers interchanged to District line services at Aldgate East, which was increasing dwell times. In order to relieve this, the peak-hours Metropolitan line service was diverted to Barking in 1936. With the station now under single ownership, a number of improvements could be made as part of the 1935 New Works Plan. This included providing a replacement station slightly to the east of the old one, a subway connection to an additional exit on the south side of Whitechapel High Street, adding entrances at the east end of the platforms to improve circulation, and remodelling the junctions to the west of the station to allow longer eight-car Metropolitan line trains to operate to Barking.

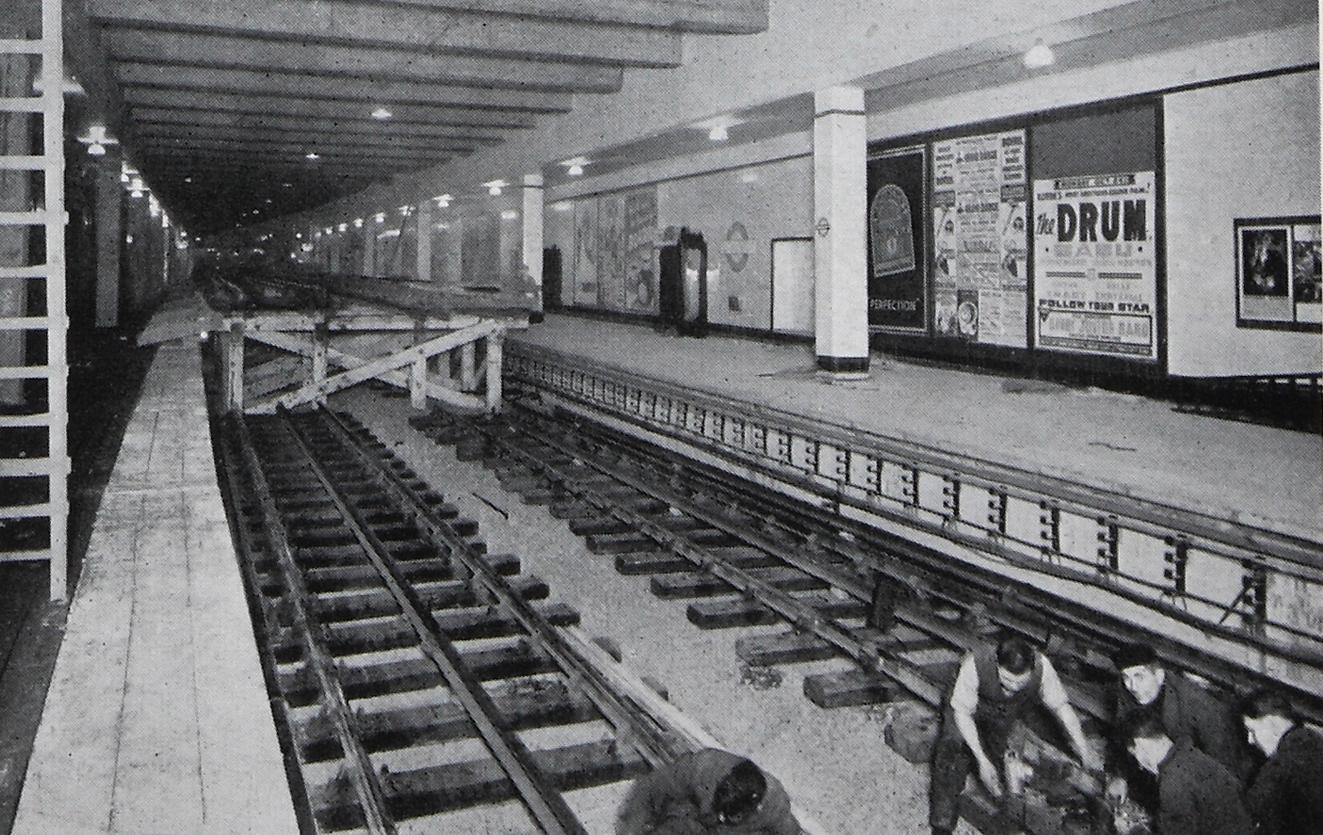
Tracks being lowered into place at the replacement station

The new eastern entrances would be very near to St Mary's (Whitechapel Road), the next station along the line, and as it was much less well used it was abandoned. It closed to passengers on 1 May 1938. In order to accommodate the subterranean ticket offices at either end of the platforms, the track through the station had to be lowered by seven feet (2 m) and gradients built at either end. This was achieved by building the enlarged tunnel around the old one. The tracks were held at their original level by wooden trestles. The line remained open throughout the works, which took place mostly at night. The line was closed only on Sunday 30 October 1938 to allow the changeover to take place. The engineers and 900 workers lowered 1,400 feet (430 m) of track. The new station opened on 31 October 1938. The track and signalling was then remodelled, with the new layout coming in to service on 27 November 1938. Eight-car Metropolitan line service commenced on 17 July 1939, with eight trains per hour at peak times between Uxbridge and Barking. This service was suspended on 6 October 1941 and reverted to the shorter Hammersmith trains.

On 30 July 1990, the Hammersmith–Barking service of the Metropolitan line gained a separate identity as the Hammersmith & City line. In 2006, a campaign was launched by a Tower Hamlets councillor to change the name of the station to "Brick Lane" by 2012, but this was not supported. The same councillor campaigned to have Shoreditch High Street station renamed "Banglatown".

== Design ==
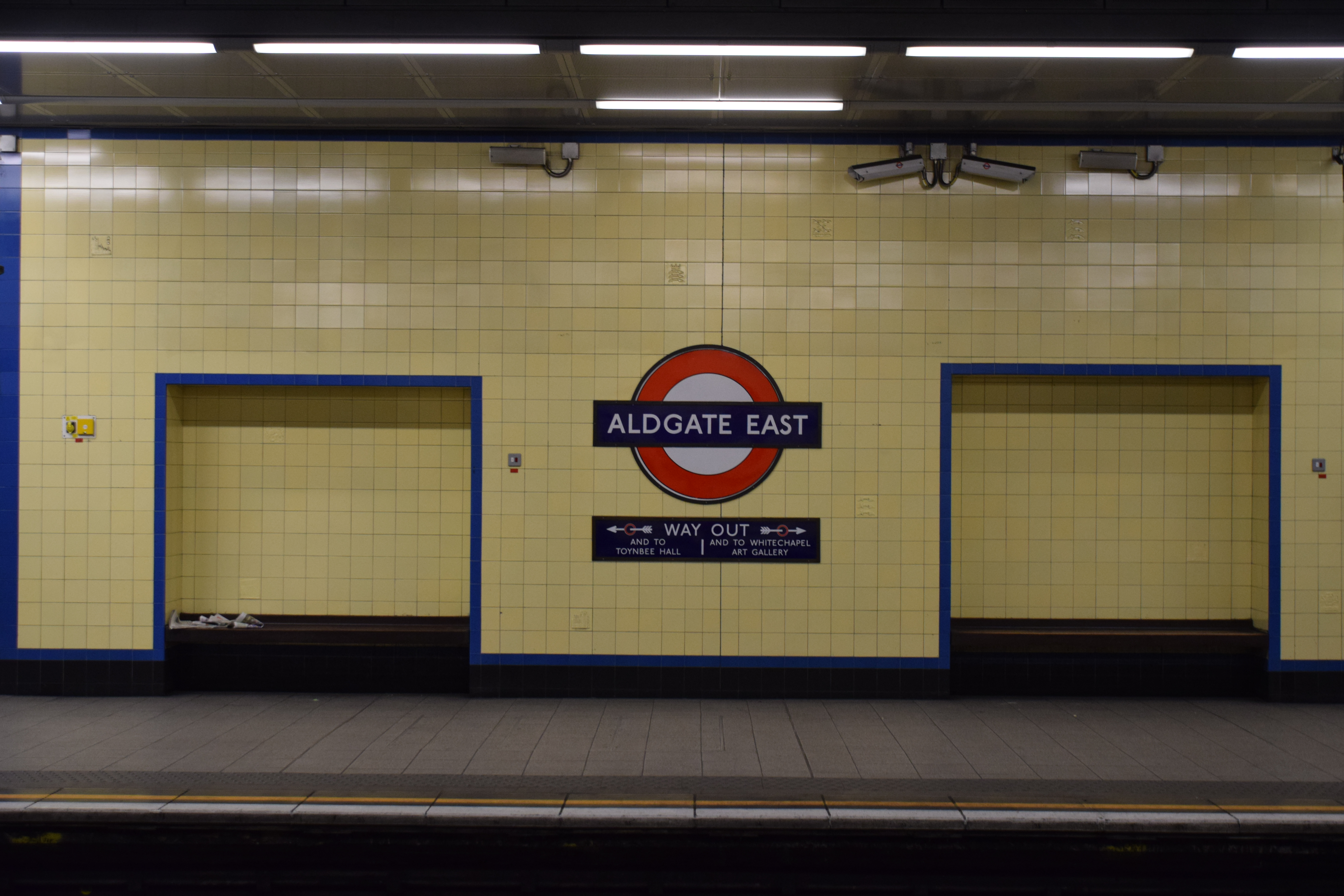
Cream and blue tilework with Stabler-designed relief tiles and alcove seating

There is little trace of the 1884 station, with the above-ground Ford-designed building from 1914 and the old underground platforms now demolished. The former platform columns and the remains of the footbridge can be seen from passing trains. The station consists of two subterranean side platforms—numbered 1 for westbound and 2 for eastbound—either side of the tracks. Metal eye bolts can be seen in the ceiling that were used to temporarily suspend the track during the station relocation. The station is finished in bright cream and blue tiled walls. The platform walls include Harold Stabler-designed relief tiles representing locations around London, commissioned by the London Passenger Transport Board in 1936. The tilework was replaced with replicas in 2009 and 2010. The station has four entrances that are incorporated into buildings, except for the southeastern subway entrance. The northern entrances are from 1938, with the northeastern one part of the Whitechapel Gallery building. The southwestern 1938 entrance was demolished c. 2012 with a modern replacement.

== Location ==
The station is located on Whitechapel High Street in the Whitechapel neighbourhood of the London Borough of Tower Hamlets. It is served by London Buses routes 15, 25, 115, 135, 205, 242, 254, D3, and night routes N15, N25, N205, N253 and N550.

Whitechapel is 0.82 kilometres (0.51 mi) to the east of the station. Liverpool Street is 0.92 kilometres (0.57 mi) to the northwest and Tower Hill is 0.8 kilometres (0.50 mi) to the southwest. It is 23.88 kilometres (14.84 mi) from the eastern terminus at Upminster.

== Services ==
The station is managed by London Underground. It is in London fare zone 1. The typical off-peak service from the station is twelve District line trains per hour to Upminster with a further three trains to Barking. There are fifteen trains westbound to Earl's Court, of which six continue to Ealing Broadway, six continue to Richmond and three to Wimbledon. At peak periods the number of trains per hour increases. There are six Hammersmith & City line trains an hour to Barking and six to Hammersmith at all times.

Services towards central London operate from approximately 05:20 to 00:20 and services to Upminster operate from approximately 05:40 to 01:00. With 11.61 million entries and exits in 2025, it was ranked the 54th busiest London Underground station.

== Notes ==
Preceding station	London Underground	Following station
Tower Hill towards Wimbledon, Richmond or Ealing Broadway	District line	Whitechapel towards Upminster
Liverpool Street towards Hammersmith	Hammersmith & City line	Whitechapel towards Barking
Former services
Preceding station	London Underground	Following station
Mark Lane towards Wimbledon, Richmond or Ealing Broadway	District line (1884–1938)	St Mary's (Whitechapel Road) towards Upminster
Mark Lane towards Wimbledon, Richmond or Ealing Broadway	District line (1938–1967)	Whitechapel towards Upminster
Liverpool Street towards Hammersmith	Metropolitan line (1884–1938)	St Mary's (Whitechapel Road) towards New Cross
