= East End literature =

Literature set in London's East End

East End literature comprises novels, short stories, plays, poetry, films, and non-fictional writings set in the East End of London. Crime, poverty, vice, sexual transgression, drugs, class-conflict and multi-cultural encounters and fantasies involving Jews, Chinamen (and women) and Indian immigrants are major themes.

== Novels and short stories ==
Among the first and most prominent authors to depict the East End in fiction was Charles Dickens (1812–1870). His godfather had a sail making business in Limehouse, and he based the Six Jolly Fellowship Porters in Our Mutual Friend (1864–65) on a public house still standing there. The Red Bull, a now demolished inn situated in Whitechapel, features in his Pickwick Papers. On leaving it Sam Weller makes the sage remark that Whitechapel is "not a wery nice neighbourhood". Fagin in Dickens's Oliver Twist appears to be based on a notorious 'fence' named Ikey Solomon (1785–1850) who operated in 1820s Whitechapel. Dickens was also a frequent visitor to the East End theatres and music halls of Hoxton, Shoreditch and Whitechapel, writing of his visits in his journals and his journalism. A visit he made to an opium den in Bluegate Fields inspired certain scenes in his last, unfinished, novel The Mystery of Edwin Drood (1870).

Arthur Morrison (1863–1945), a native East-Ender, wrote A Child of the Jago (1896) a fictional account of the extreme poverty encountered in the Old Nichol rookery. Oscar Wilde (1854–1900) observed the practice of 'people of quality' visiting the many entertainments available in Whitechapel and sent his hedonistic hero Dorian Gray there to sample the delights on offer in his novel The Picture of Dorian Gray.

The experiences of the Jewish community in the East End inspired many works of fiction. Israel Zangwill (1864–1926), educated in Spitalfields, wrote the influential Children of the Ghetto (1892) and other novels on this subject. Zangwill's The Big Bow Mystery (1898) was a notable detective story set in the East End, and was adapted for the screen three times. Another Jewish writer, Simon Blumenfeld (1907–2005) wrote plays and novels, such as Jew Boy (1935), informed by his years in Whitechapel. Wolf Mankowitz, born in Fashion Street, Spitalfields was another Jewish writer from the area. His 1953 book A Kid for Two Farthings, set in the East End, was adapted for the cinema three years later. The local Jewish writer Alexander Baron (1917–1999), wrote fiction on lowlife, gambling and crime in the East End. Baron's The Lowlife (1963), set in Hackney, is dubbed as "a riotous, off-beat novel about gamblers, prostitutes and lay-abouts of London's East End". However, arguably the most famous novel documenting the Jewish existence in the East End is Journey Through a Small Planet (1972) by Emanuel Litvinoff. The autobiographical novel contains a series of stories first broadcast on the radio in the 1960s, that document the young Litvinoff's experiences in the East End and those of his community.

Chinatown, Limehouse, also provided inspiration for novelists. Sax Rohmer (1883–1959) wrote fantasies set there, featuring many scenes in opium dens, introducing one of the 20th century's master villains, Fu Manchu, in a series of novels of which the first was The Mystery of Dr. Fu Manchu (1913). Thomas Burke (1886–1945) explored the same territory in Limehouse Nights (1916).

As demonstrated above the area has been productive of much local writing talent, however, from the time Oscar Wilde's Dorian Gray the idea of 'slumming it' in the 'forbidden' East End has held a fascination for a coterie of the literati. One contemporary manifestation of this is the school of psychogeography espoused most prominently by Peter Ackroyd, (particularly in his novel Hawksmoor) and Iain Sinclair. A colder eye on contemporary gentrification of the area and the rise of the yuppie is cast by Penelope Lively in Passing On (1989) and City of the Mind (1991) and by P. D. James in Original Sin (1994).

Emblematic of the worldwide clash of civilisations between West and East, of which the East End has historically been a microcosm, are Brick Lane (2003) by Monica Ali and Salman Rushdie's controversial The Satanic Verses (1988) both of which are set amongst the Bangladeshi community of Spitalfields. Brick Lane is set in Whitechapel and documents the life of a young Bangladeshi woman's experience of living in Tower Hamlets in the 1990s and early 2000s.

The main character of William Gibson and Bruce Sterling's novel The Difference Engine, Sybil Gerard, a political courtesan and the daughter of a Luddite leader, came from Whitechapel, and the novel begins there. This novel is based on Benjamin Disraeli's novel Sybil.

== Plays ==
Playwrights have often located their work in the East End. During the 1950s and 1960s, much drama was inspired and encouraged by the work of Joan Littlewood and Theatre Workshop, based in the Theatre Royal Stratford East. Their new works explored the experiences and position of their local audience. Many productions transferred both to the West End and were made into films. In the 1970s and 1980s the Half Moon Theatre presented premières of European works and new works by London playwrights, such as Edward Bond and Steven Berkoff.

Plays set in the East End include The Hamlet of Stepney Green by Bernard Kops. Kops was born in the East End, the son of Dutch Jewish immigrants,

Nobel Prize-winning dramatist Harold Pinter (1930–2008) was born and raised in the Hackney, and educated at Hackney Downs School. Another playwright from the East End is Arnold Wesker, author of Chicken Soup with Barley (1956). It is the first of a trilogy and was first performed on stage in 1958 at the Belgrade Theatre in Coventry, where Wesker's two other plays of that trilogy—Roots and I'm Talking About Jerusalem—also premiered. The play is about the Jewish Kahn family living in 1936 in London, and traces the downfall of their ideals in a changing world, parallel to the disintegration of the family, until 1956. The character Sarah is based on Arnold Wesker's aunt, Sarah Wesker, who was a trade union activist in the East End of London.

== Poetry ==
East London

’TWAS August, and the fierce sun overhead
Smote on the squalid streets of Bethnal Green,
And the pale weaver, through his windows seen
In Spitalfields, look’d thrice dispirited;

I met a preacher there I knew, and said:
‘Ill and o’erwork’d, how fare you in this scene?’
‘Bravely!’ said he; ‘for I of late have been
Much cheer’d with thoughts of Christ, the living bread.’

O human soul! as long as thou canst so
Set up a mark of everlasting light,
Above the howling senses’ ebb and flow,

To cheer thee, and to right thee if thou roam,
Not with lost toil thou labourest through the night!
Thou mak’st the heaven thou hop’st indeed thy home.

Matthew Arnold. First published in New Poems, 1867.

Although the poet Isaac Rosenberg (1890–1918) was born in Bristol, in 1897, the family moved to Stepney. His parents, Barnett (formerly Dovber) and Hacha Rosenberg, were Lithuanian Jewish immigrants to Britain from Dvinsk (now in Latvia). Isaac Rosenberg attended St. Paul's Primary School at Wellclose Square, St George in the East parish. Later, he went to the Baker Street Board School in Stepney, which had a strong Jewish presence. Rosenberg's Poems from the Trenches are recognized as some of the most outstanding poetry written during the First World War.

Future Prime Minister Clement Attlee wrote a poem "In Limehouse" (1922) about that district. Beside the Thames, Shadwell Dock Stair is immortalised in Wilfred Owen's poem "Shadwell Stair".

== Non-fiction ==
An early example of a memoir of the East End is The People of the Abyss by Jack London, which describes his experiences of Whitechapel in 1903. This inspired George Orwell to repeat the experiment in the same area in the 1930s for part of Down and Out in Paris and London (1933). Later East End memoirs include East End My Cradle (1940) by Willy Goldman, The World Is A Wedding (1963) by Bernard Kops, No Tears in Aldgate (1963) (reissued as Time Remembered) and Spring In Aldgate (1968) (reissued as Grief Forgotten) by Ralph L. Finn, Between High Walls: A London Childhood (1972) and My Part Of The River (1974) (reissued together as Four Meals For Fourpence) by Grace Foakes, Growing up Poor in London (1973) by Louis Heren, and Scenes From a Stepney Youth (1988) by Charles Poulsen.

More recent memoirs of the area include Limehouse Days (1991) by Daniel Farson, Silvertown (2002) by Melanie McGrath, Poplar Memories (2002) by John Hector, and Tarquin Hall's Salaam Brick Lane (2005).

Rodinsky's Room (1999) by Rachel Lichtenstein and Iain Sinclair tells the story of Lichtenstein's attempts to uncover the story of the reclusive Jewish autodidact David Rodinsky, who disappeared in the late 1960s, with his room, above a synagogue at 19 Princelet Street, Spitalfields, discovered undisturbed twenty years later.

Where There's A Will, There's A Way (2012) by Jim Crooks is a biographical, fact-based account of the life story of Labour MP, social reformer and Mayor of Poplar, Will Crooks (the Will Crooks Estate in Poplar is named after him).

Other non-memoir histories include East End Story by A.B. Levy (1951) and Point Of Arrival (1975) by Chaim Bermant.

== Bibliography ==
- Ed Glinert (2000) A Literary Guide to London
- William Taylor (2001) This Bright Field: A Travel Book in One Place
