= A Stitch in Time =

A Stitch in Time may refer to:

- A Stitch in Time (EP), 2006, by The Twilight Singers
- "A Stitch in Time", a Mike Waterson song
- "A Stitch in Time", a song by The Smashing Pumpkins on their 2009 album Teargarden by Kaleidyscope
- A Stitch in Time (Lively novel), a 1976 novel by Penelope Lively
- A Stitch in Time (Robinson novel), a 2000 Star Trek: Deep Space Nine novel by Andrew J. Robinson
- "A Stitch in Time", a story from the 1970 collection Paddington Takes the Air, featuring Paddington Bear
- A Stitch in Time, a 1919 American comedy silent film directed by Ralph Ince
- A Stitch in Time (1963 film), a British comedy film with Norman Wisdom
- A Stitch in Time (2022 film), an Australian drama film
- "A Stitch in Time" (Continuum), a 2012 television episode
- "A Stitch in Time" (Doctor in the House), a 1970 television episode
- "A Stitch in Time" (The Outer Limits), a 1996 television episode

== See also ==
- Kim Possible: A Sitch in Time, a 2003 television movie
- The switch in time that saved nine, a metaphorical aphorism used to describe a purported change in the direction of the US Supreme Court
