= Victorian literature =

English literature during the era of Queen Victoria

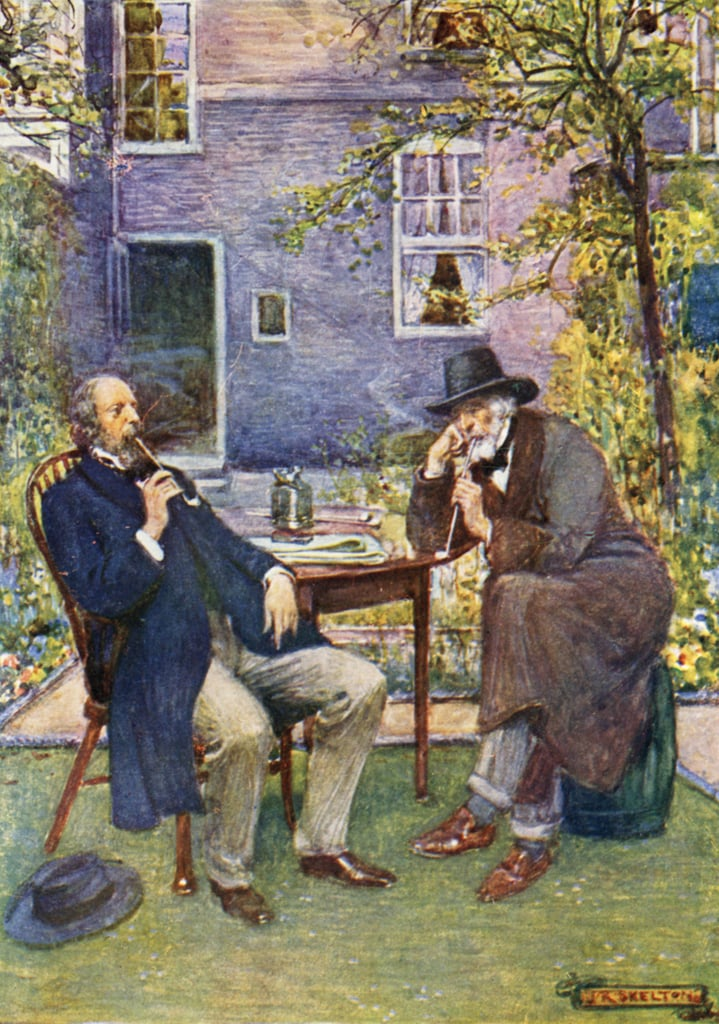
'Carlyle and Tennyson talked and smoked together.' Drawing by J. R. Skelton, 1920

Victorian literature is English literature during the reign of Queen Victoria (1837–1901). In the Victorian era, the novel became the leading literary genre in English. English writing from this era reflects the major transformations in most aspects of English life, from scientific, economic, and technological advances to changes in class structures and the role of religion in society. The number of new novels published each year increased from 100 at the start of the period to 1000 by the end of it. Famous novelists from this period include Charles Dickens, William Makepeace Thackeray, the three Brontë sisters (Charlotte, Emily, and Anne Brontë), Elizabeth Gaskell, George Eliot (Mary Ann Evans), Thomas Hardy, and Rudyard Kipling.

The Romantic period was a time of abstract expression and inward focus; during the Victorian era, writers focused on social issues. Writers such as Thomas Carlyle called attention to the dehumanizing effects of the Industrial Revolution and what Carlyle called the "Mechanical Age". This awareness inspired the subject matter of other authors, like poet Elizabeth Barrett Browning and novelists Charles Dickens and Thomas Hardy. Barrett's works on child labor cemented her success in a male-dominated world where women writers often had to use masculine pseudonyms. Dickens employed humor and an approachable tone while addressing social problems such as wealth disparity. Hardy used his novels to question religion and social structures.

Poetry and theatre were also present during the Victorian era. Robert Browning and Alfred Tennyson were Victorian England's most famous poets. With regard to the theatre it was not until the last decades of the 19th century that any significant works were produced. Notable playwrights of the time include Gilbert and Sullivan, George Bernard Shaw, and Oscar Wilde.

== Prose fiction ==
Charles Dickens is the most famous Victorian novelist. With a focus on strong characterization, Dickens became extraordinarily popular in his day and remains one of the most popular and read authors of the world. Dickens began his literary career with Sketches by Boz (1833–1836) which collected short stories published in various newspapers and other periodicals. His first novel, The Pickwick Papers (1836–1837) written when he was twenty-five, was an overnight success, and all his subsequent works sold extremely well. The comedy of his first novel has a satirical edge and this pervades his writing. While at the beginning of the 19th century most novels were published in three volumes, monthly serialization was revived with the publication of Charles Dickens' Pickwick Papers in twenty parts between April 1836 and November 1837. Demand was high for each episode to introduce some new element, whether it was a plot twist or a new character, so as to maintain the readers' interest. Dickens worked diligently and prolifically to produce the entertaining writing that the public wanted, but also to offer commentary on social problems and the plight of the poor and oppressed. His most important works include Oliver Twist (1837–1839), Nicholas Nickleby (1838–1839), A Christmas Carol (1843), Dombey and Son (1846–1848), David Copperfield (1849–1850), Bleak House (1852–1853), Little Dorrit (1855–1857), A Tale of Two Cities (1859), and Great Expectations (1860–1861). His later novels become progressively darker, mirroring a tendency in much of Victorian writing.

William Makepeace Thackeray was Dickens' great rival in the first half of Queen Victoria's reign. With a similar style but a slightly more detached, acerbic and barbed satirical view of his characters, he also tended to depict a more middle-class society than Dickens did. He is best known for his novels The Luck of Barry Lyndon (1844) and Vanity Fair (1847–1848) which are examples of a popular form in Victorian literature: a historical novel in which recent history is depicted.

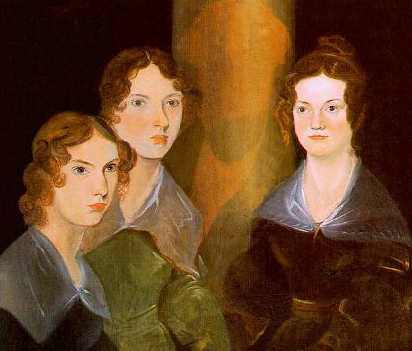
The Brontë sisters wrote fiction rather different from that common at the time.

The three Brontë sisters, Charlotte, Emily, and Anne Brontë, produced notable works of the period, although these were not immediately appreciated by Victorian critics. Jane Eyre (1847), by Charlotte Brontë, is a major Victorian novel with Gothic themes inspired by the previous generation of gothic writers. Her novel features many similar characteristics of Ann Radcliffe's The Mysteries of Udolpho (1794) including gloomy, isolated mansions and supernatural elements. Alongside Jane Austen's Pride and Prejudice (1813), it is considered one of the greatest novels in the English language. Wuthering Heights (1847), Emily's only work, is an example of Gothic Romanticism from a woman's point of view, which examines class, myth, and gender. Anne's second novel, The Tenant of Wildfell Hall (1848), written in a realistic rather than romantic style, is mainly considered to be the first sustained feminist novel.

Elizabeth Gaskell produced notable works during this period, including Mary Barton (1848), Cranford (1851–1853), North and South (1854–1855), and Wives and Daughters (1864–1866).

George Eliot (Mary Ann Evans) also produced major works during this period, most notably Adam Bede (1859), The Mill on the Floss (1860), Silas Marner (1861), Middlemarch (1871–1872), and Daniel Deronda (1876). Like the Brontës she published under a masculine pseudonym.

Later in this period, Thomas Hardy's best-known novels are Far from the Madding Crowd (1874), The Mayor of Casterbridge (1886), Tess of the d'Urbervilles (1891), and Jude the Obscure (1895). Renowned for his cynical yet idyllic portrayal of pastoral life in the English countryside, Hardy's work pushed back against widespread urbanization that came to symbolize the Victorian age.

Other significant novelists of this era were Anthony Trollope (1815–1882), Wilkie Collins (1824–1889), George Meredith (1828–1909), and George Gissing (1857–1903).

== Poetry ==
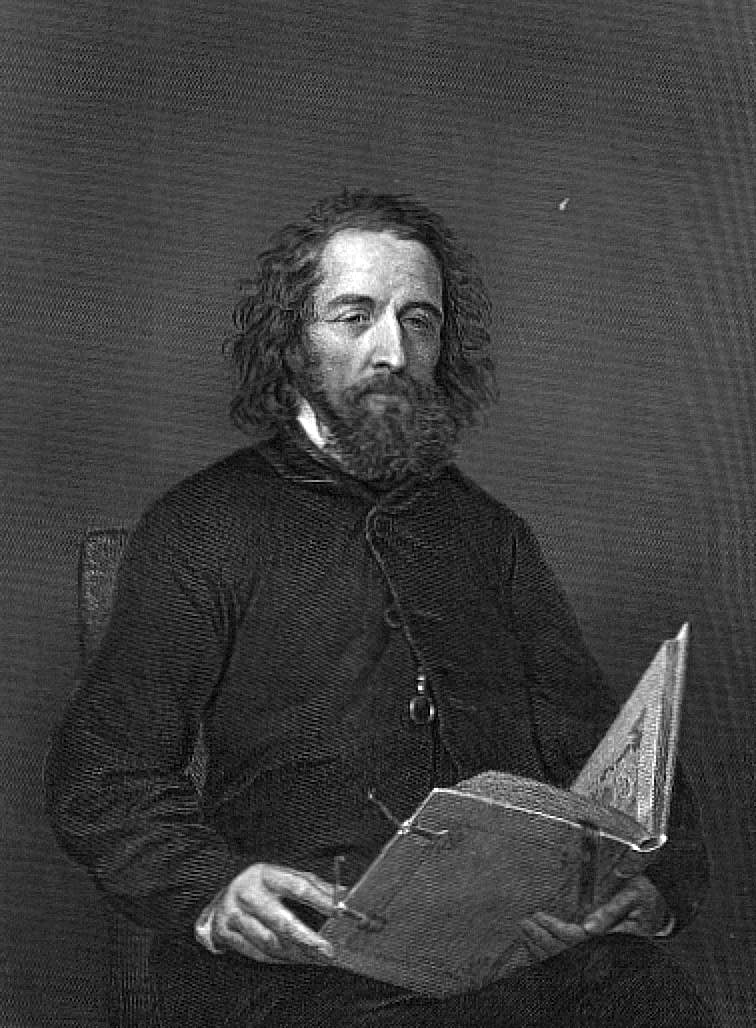
Lord Tennyson, the Poet Laureate

Robert Browning (1812–1889) and Alfred Tennyson (1809–1892) were notable poets in Victorian England. Thomas Hardy wrote poetry throughout his life, but did not publish a collection until 1898. The poetry of Gerard Manley Hopkins (1844–1889) was published posthumously in 1918. Algernon Charles Swinburne (1837–1909) is also considered an important literary figure of the period, especially his poems and critical writings. Early poetry of W. B. Yeats was also published in Victoria's reign.

Elizabeth Barrett Browning and Robert Browning became acquainted first by reading each other's poetry and both produced poems inspired by their relationship. Both Matthew Arnold and Gerard Manley Hopkins wrote poems that sit somewhere in between the exultation of nature of the Romantic poetry and the Georgian poetry of the early 20th century. However, Hopkins's poetry was not published until 1918. Arnold's works anticipate some of the themes of these later poets, while Hopkins drew inspiration from verse forms of Old English poetry such as Beowulf.

The reclaiming of the past was a major part of Victorian literature with an interest in both classical literature and also medieval literature of England. This movement can be traced back to Letitia Elizabeth Landon and her poetry collections. Victorians loved chivalrous stories of knights of old; they hoped to regain some of that courtly behaviour for readers at home and in the wider empire. The best example of this is Alfred Tennyson's Idylls of the King, which blended the stories of King Arthur, particularly those by Thomas Malory, with contemporary concerns and ideas. The Pre-Raphaelite Brotherhood also drew on myth and folklore for their art, with Dante Gabriel Rossetti contemporaneously regarded as the chief poet amongst them, although his sister Christina is now held by scholars to be a stronger poet. Another poet, now regarded as of importance, who looked more to the future and dealt with the social and political issues relating to women's place in society was Augusta Webster.

== Drama ==
In drama, farces, musical burlesques, extravaganzas and comic operas competed with Shakespeare productions and serious drama by the likes of James Planché and Thomas William Robertson. In 1855, the German Reed Entertainments began a process of elevating the level of (formerly risqué) musical theatre in Britain that culminated in the famous series of comic operas by Gilbert and Sullivan and were followed by the 1890s with the first Edwardian musical comedies. The first play to achieve 500 consecutive performances was the London comedy Our Boys by H. J. Byron, opening in 1875. Its astonishing new record of 1,362 performances was bested in 1892 by Charley's Aunt by Brandon Thomas. After W. S. Gilbert, Oscar Wilde became the leading poet and dramatist of the late Victorian period. Wilde's plays, in particular, stand apart from the many now-forgotten plays of Victorian times and have a closer relationship to those of the Edwardian dramatists such as George Bernard Shaw, whose career began in the 1890s. Wilde's 1895 comic masterpiece, The Importance of Being Earnest, was the greatest of the plays in which he held an ironic mirror to the aristocracy while displaying virtuosic mastery of wit and paradoxical wisdom. It has remained extremely popular. The plays of Arthur Wing Pinero have been staged again in the last few decades.

== Children's literature ==
The Victorians are credited with "inventing childhood", partly via their efforts to stop child labor and the introduction of compulsory education. As children began to be able to read, literature for young people became a growth industry, with not only established writers producing works for children (such as Dickens' A Child's History of England) but also a new group of dedicated children's authors. Writers like Lewis Carroll (Alice's Adventures in Wonderland), Anna Sewell (Black Beauty), and R. M. Ballantyne (The Coral Island) wrote mainly for children, although they had an adult following. Other authors such as Robert Louis Stevenson (Treasure Island) and Anthony Hope (The Prisoner of Zenda) wrote mainly for adults, but their adventure novels are now generally classified as for children. Other genres include nonsense verse, poetry which required a childlike interest (e.g. Lewis Carroll's "Jabberwocky"). School stories flourished: Thomas Hughes' Tom Brown's Schooldays and Kipling's Stalky & Co. are classics.

Rarely were these publications designed to capture a child's pleasure; however, with the increase in the use of illustrations, children began to enjoy literature and were able to learn morals in a more entertaining way. With the newfound acceptance of reading for pleasure, fairy tales and folk tales became popular. Compiling folk tales by many authors with different topics made it possible for children to read literature about many topics which interested them. There were different types of books and magazines written for boys and girls. Girls' stories tended to be domestic and to focus on family life, whereas boys' stories were more about adventures.

== Nonfiction ==
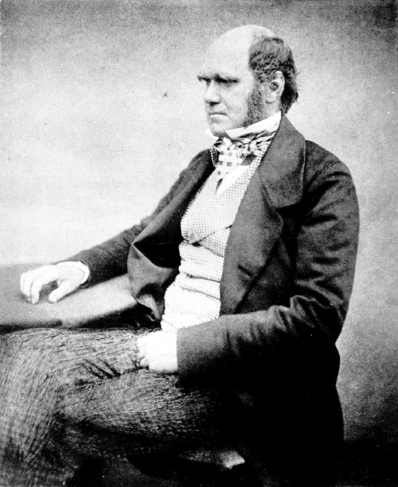
Charles Darwin's work On the Origin of Species affected society, throughout the Victoria era, and still does today.

=== Science, philosophy, and discovery ===
The Victorian era was an important time for the development of science and the Victorians had a mission to describe and classify the entire natural world. Much of this writing does not rise to the level of being regarded as literature but one book in particular, Charles Darwin's On the Origin of Species, remains famous. The theory of evolution contained within the work challenged many of the ideas the Victorians had about themselves and their place in the world. Although it took a long time to be widely accepted, it would dramatically change subsequent thoughts and literature. Much of the work of popularizing Darwin's theories was done by his younger contemporary Thomas Henry Huxley, who wrote widely on the subject.

A number of other non-fiction works of the era made their mark on the literature of the period. The philosophical writings of John Stuart Mill covered logic, economics, liberty and utilitarianism. The large and influential histories of Thomas Carlyle, The French Revolution: A History (1837), and On Heroes, Hero-Worship, & the Heroic in History (1841) permeated political thought at the time. The writings of Thomas Babington Macaulay on English history helped codify the Whig narrative that dominated the historiography for many years. John Ruskin wrote a number of highly influential works on art and the history of art and championed such contemporary figures as J. M. W. Turner and the Pre-Raphaelites. The religious writer John Henry Newman's Oxford Movement aroused intense debate within the Church of England, exacerbated by Newman's own conversion to Catholicism, which he wrote about in his autobiography Apologia Pro Vita Sua.

A number of monumental references works were published in this era, most notably the Oxford English Dictionary which would eventually become the most important historical dictionary of the English language. Also published during the later Victorian era was the Dictionary of National Biography and the ninth edition of the Encyclopædia Britannica.

=== Nature writing ===
In the United States, Henry David Thoreau's works and Susan Fenimore Cooper's Rural Hours (1850) were canonical influences on Victorian nature writing. In the UK, Philip Gosse and Sarah Bowdich Lee were two of the most popular nature writers in the early part of the Victorian era. The Illustrated London News, founded in 1842, was the world's first illustrated weekly newspaper and often published articles and illustrations dealing with nature; in the second half of the 19th century, books, articles, and illustrations on nature became widespread and popular among an increasingly urbanized reading public.

=== Supernatural and fantastic literature ===
The old Gothic tales that came out of the late 19th century are the first examples of the genre of fantasy fiction. These tales often centered on larger-than-life characters such as Sherlock Holmes, famous detective of the times, Sexton Blake, and other fictional characters of the era, such as Dracula, Edward Hyde, The Invisible Man, and many other fictional characters who often had exotic enemies to foil. Spanning the 18th and 19th centuries, there was a particular type of story-writing known as gothic. Gothic literature combines romance and horror in an attempt to thrill and terrify the reader. Possible features in a gothic novel are foreign monsters, ghosts, curses, hidden rooms, and witchcraft. Gothic tales usually take place in locations such as castles, monasteries, and cemeteries, although the gothic monsters sometimes cross over into the real world, making appearances in cities such as London.

== The influence of Victorian literature ==
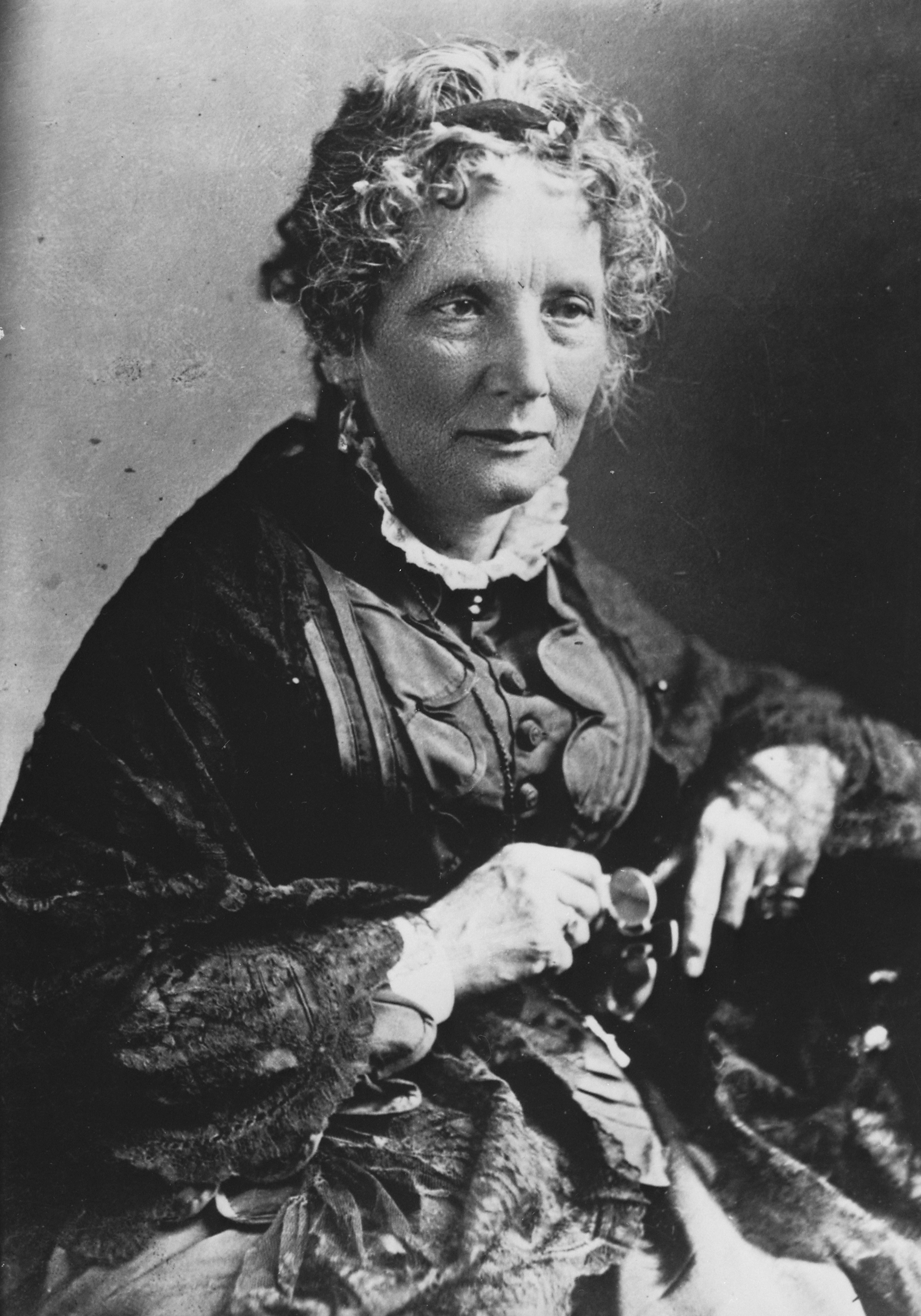
Harriet Beecher Stowe wrote Victorian fiction outside Victoria's domains.

Writers from the United States and the British colonies of Australia, New Zealand, and Canada were influenced by the literature of Britain and are often classed as a part of Victorian literature, although they were gradually developing their own distinctive voices. Victorian writers of Canadian literature include Grant Allen, Susanna Moodie and Catherine Parr Traill. Australian literature has the poets Adam Lindsay Gordon and Banjo Paterson, who wrote Waltzing Matilda, and New Zealand literature includes Thomas Bracken and Frederick Edward Maning. From the sphere of literature of the United States during this time are some of the country's greats including: Emily Dickinson, Ralph Waldo Emerson, Nathaniel Hawthorne, Oliver Wendell Holmes Sr., Henry James, Herman Melville, Harriet Beecher Stowe, Henry David Thoreau, Mark Twain and Walt Whitman.

The problem with the classification of "Victorian literature" is the great difference between the early works of the period and the later works which had more in common with the writers of the Edwardian period and many writers straddle this divide. People such as Arthur Conan Doyle, Rudyard Kipling, H. G. Wells, Bram Stoker, H. Rider Haggard, Jerome K. Jerome and Joseph Conrad all wrote some of their important works during Victoria's reign but the sensibility of their writing is frequently regarded as Edwardian.

== Other Victorian writers ==
- Sabine Baring-Gould (1834-1924)
- Samuel Butler (1835–1902)
- Arthur Hugh Clough (1819–1861)
- Wilkie Collins (1824–1889)
- A. E. Housman (1859–1936)
- William Henry Giles Kingston (1814–1880)
- Letitia Elizabeth Landon (1802–1838)
- Mary Louisa Molesworth (1839–1921)
- R. D. Blackmore (1825 – 1900)
- George Moore (1852–1933)
- Walter Pater (1839–1894)
- Coventry Patmore (1823–1896)
- John Ruskin (1819–1900)
- John Millington Synge (1871–1909)
- Charlotte Mary Yonge (1823–1901)
- Arthur Conan Doyle (1859–1930)

== See also ==
- British literature
- British regional literature
- Industrial novel
- English literature
- Victorian pessimism

== Notes ==
Preceded by Romanticism	Victorian literature 1837–1901	Succeeded by Modernism
