= Anne Catherine Monkland =

- Born: 1787
- Died: July 25, 1869; Bath
- Occupation: Novelist
- Relatives: Sarah Ferrand Busfield, Walker Ferrand

Anne Catherine Monkland (1787 – 25 July 1869) was a British novelist.

She was born Anne Ferrand in 1787, the daughter of John Ferrand of Barnard Castle and Sarah Dale. Her siblings included Walter Ferrand, MP for Tralee. In 1809, she married Edward Surtees of Seatonburn and they had one son. Edward Surtees died in 1812. Her second husband was Captain George T. B. Monkland of Bath.

Her first novel was Life in India; or, The English at Calcutta (1828). It is a series of interconnected stories about a group of young women travelling to India aboard the Cumberland. Comic relief is provided by the ship's surgeon, Dr. Pillet, in the form of pratfalls and his use of American English. Her Village Reminiscences by an Old Maid (1837) was a rural local colour story in the manner of Our Village by Mary Russell Mitford. Most of her work was related to India so it is thought she may have visited or lived there.

Anne Monkland died on July 25, 1869 in Bath.

== Bibliography ==
- Life in India; or, The English at Calcutta. 3 vol. London, Henry Colburn, 1828.
- Village Reminiscences by an Old Maid. London: Bentley, 1834.
- The Nabob's Wife. 3 vol. London: Bentley, 1837.
- The Nabob at Home: or, The Return to England. 3 vol. London: Henry Colburn, 1842.
