= Valentine Low =

British journalist

Valentine Low is a British journalist. He was the royal correspondent for The Times from 2008 to 2023.

== Early life ==
Low was educated at Winchester College and Wadham College, Oxford. The novelist Penelope Lively is Low's half-sister.

== Career ==
Low worked on local newspapers in Northampton and Sheffield before joining The London Evening Standard in 1987. Low started a column on the card game poker at the Evening Standard, and also wrote a column about his allotment. Low's writings about his allotment formed the basis for his 2008 book One Man and His Dig which was described as a "guidebook for green-fingered urbanites". He covered the September 11 attacks in 2001 and the 2004 Indian Ocean earthquake and tsunami among other major news stories while at the paper.

Low joined the Times in 2008 from the Evening Standard saying that "Perhaps I'm being impetuous but after 21 years I thought it was time to move on". Low replaced Alan Hamilton, who had been the royal correspondent for The Times since 1982.

Low broke the story of claims of bullying of royal staff by Meghan, Duchess of Sussex in an article for The Times in May 2021. The story was published a few days before the broadcast of Oprah with Meghan and Harry, an interview by Oprah Winfrey with Meghan and her husband, Prince Harry, Duke of Sussex. In an interview with Amol Rajan for his documentary The Princes and the Press, Low denied that the story of bullying allegations had been leaked to him with the "tacit approval" of William, Prince of Wales, Harry's brother. Low subsequently elaborated further on the reason behind the report's publishing: "It wasn't my desire to get the story out before Oprah, or even the wishes of a sinister cabal of Palace plotters: it was the victims of the alleged bullying who wanted to have their story heard." He later stated that they received "several strongly worded letters from their lawyers before we published – after we published we didn't hear a word from them. So that speaks volumes, too."

== Courtiers ==
Low's book Courtiers: The Hidden Power Behind the Crown was published on 6 October 2022 by Headline. Excerpts from Courtiers were published in The Times in September 2022.

== Bibliography ==
- One Man and His Dig (Simon & Schuster, 2008) ISBN 9781847391285
- Courtiers: The Hidden Power Behind the Crown (Headline, 2022) ISBN 9781472290908
- Power and the Palace: The Inside Story of the Monarchy and 10 Downing Street (Headline, 2025) ISBN 9781035418817
