= The Road to Lichfield =

1977 novel by Penelope Lively

- First UK edition
- Author: Penelope Lively
- Publisher: Heinemann (UK); Grove Weidenfeld (US)
- Publication date: 1977
- Pages: 215
- ISBN: 9780434427352

The Road To Lichfield is the first novel for adults by Penelope Lively, published in 1977. It made the short-list for the Booker Prize. It was rereleased by Penguin Essentials in 2017.

== Synopsis ==
Anne Linton, a 40-year-old suburban mother, leaves her family in Berkshire to accompany her dying father's when he is taken into a nursing home in distant Lichfield. Outside of visiting hours, she stays in her father's house in a village, and falls in love with one of his neighbours.

== Reception ==
The New York Times praised Lively's "clear and unpretentious" style and the plausible characters, but noted that the characters remained two-dimensional unlike Lively's later works.
