= British regional literature =

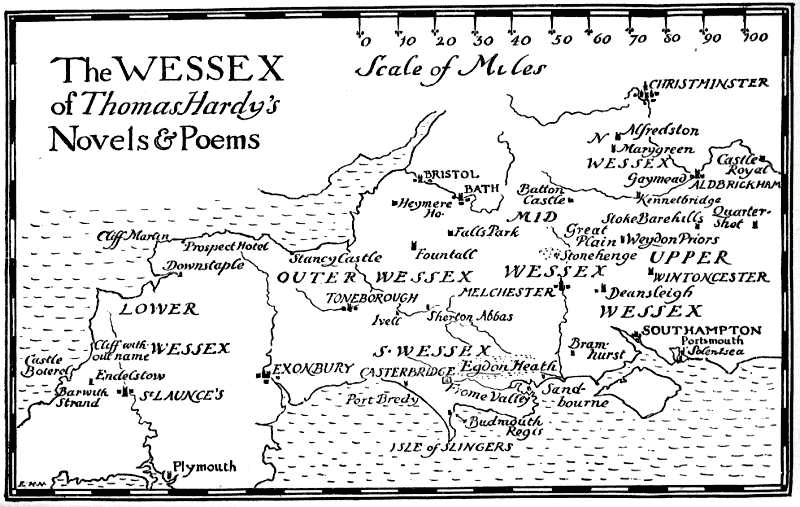
Locations in Wessex, from The Wessex of Thomas Hardy by Bertram Windle, 1902, based on correspondence with Hardy

In literature regionalism refers to fiction or poetry that focuses on specific features, such as dialect, customs, history, and landscape, of a particular region (also called "local colour"). The setting is particularly important in regional literature and the "locale is likely to be rural and/or provincial."

== Development ==
=== Novelists ===
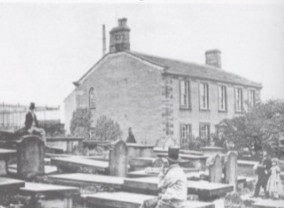
Haworth parsonage soon after Patrick Brontë's death

Thomas Hardy's (1840–1928) novels can be described as regional because of the way he makes use of these elements in relation to a part of the West of England, that he names Wessex. On the other hand, it seems much less appropriate to describe Charles Dickens (1812–1870) as a regional novelist of London and the south of England. John Cowper Powys has been seen as a successor to Thomas Hardy, and Wolf Solent, A Glastonbury Romance (1932), along with Weymouth Sands (1934) and Maiden Castle (1936), are often referred to as his Wessex novels. As with Hardy's novels, the landscape plays a major role in Powys's works, and an elemental philosophy is important in the lives of his characters. Powys's first novel Wood and Stone was dedicated to Thomas Hardy. Maiden Castle, the last of the Wessex novels, is set in Dorchester, Thomas Hardy's Casterbridge, and which he intended to be a "rival" to Hardy's Mayor of Casterbridge. Mary Butts was a modernist novelist who works are also associated with the idea of Wessex. "Like [John Cowper] Powys, she found a key to both personal and national identity by tuning into the deep history of the Dorset landscape [with emphasis on] sacred places and folk traditions".

The regional novel is generally seen as originating with Maria Edgeworth and Walter Scott, but their regions are hardily "comparable to Hardy's Wessex, Blackmore's Exmoor, or Arnold Bennett's potteries, [... because] they are nations." The term has also been used, in the past, disparagingly, especially with regard to women writers, as a synonym for minor writing.

Other writers that have been characterized as regional novelists, are the Brontë sisters from West Yorkshire. In 1904, novelist Virginia Woolf visited their birthplace Haworth and published an account in The Guardian on 21 December. She remarked on the symbiosis between the village and the Brontë sisters. She wrote: "Haworth expresses the Brontës; the Brontës express Haworth; they fit like a snail to its shell".

Mary Webb (1881–1927), Margiad Evans (1909–1958) and Geraint Goodwin (1903–1942), are associate with the Welsh border region. George Eliot (1801–1886), on the other hand, is particularly associated with the rural English Midlands, whereas Arnold Bennett (1867–1931) is the novelist of the Potteries in Staffordshire, or the "Five Towns", (actually six) that now make-up Stoke-on-Trent. R. D. Blackmore (1825–1900), was one of the most famous English novelists of the second half of the nineteenth century, and he shared with Thomas Hardy a Western England background and a strong sense of regional setting in his works. Noted for his eye for and sympathy with nature, critics of the time described this as one of the most striking features of his writings. He may be said to have done for Devon what Sir Walter Scott did for the Highlands and Hardy for Wessex. However, Blackmore is now remembered for one work, Lorna Doone.

Catherine Cookson (1906 – 1998), who wrote about her deprived youth in South Tyneside, County Durham was one United Kingdom's most widely read novelists in the twentieth century. Sid Chaplin (1916–1986) is another writer from North-east England, who wrote, amongst other things, The Day of the Sardine, published in 1961, which is set in a working-class community in Newcastle upon Tyne, North Tyneside at the very beginning of the 1960s.

=== Poets ===
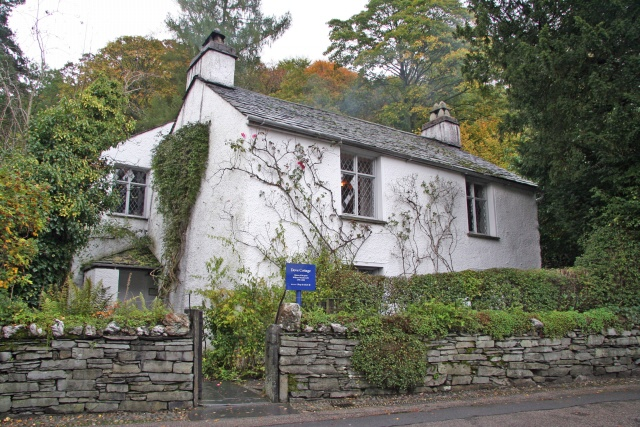
Dove Cottage, Grasmere in the Lake District, of England, where William Wordsworth lived for 14 years.

Amongst poets there is William Wordsworth (1770–1850), and the other Lake Poets, while the poet William Barnes (1801–1886) is seen as primarily a Dorset poet, especially because of his use of Dorset dialect. John Clare (1793 – 1864) was commonly known as "the Northamptonshire Peasant Poet". His formal education was brief, his other employment and class-origins were lowly. Clare resisted the use of the increasingly standardised English grammar and orthography in his poetry and prose, alluding to political reasoning in comparing "grammar" (in a wider sense of orthography) to tyrannical government and slavery, personifying it in jocular fashion as a "bitch". He wrote in his Northamptonshire dialect, introducing local words to the literary canon such as "pooty" (snail), "lady-cow" (ladybird), "crizzle" (to crisp) and "throstle" (song thrush). Alfred Tennyson (1809–1892) has been identified as a Lincolnshire poet, while Philip Larkin (1922–1985) is principally associated with the city of Hull. Basil Bunting's (1900–1985) semi-autobiographal poem Briggflatts can be read as a meditation on the limits of life and a celebration of Northumbrian culture and dialect, as symbolised by events and figures like the doomed Viking King Eric Bloodaxe.

== Ondaatje Prize ==
The Royal Society of Literature Ondaatje Prize is an annual literary award given by the Royal Society of Literature. The £10,000 award is given for a work of fiction, non-fiction or poetry which evokes the "spirit of a place", and which is written by someone who is a citizen of or who has been resident in the Commonwealth or the Republic of Ireland. The prize bears the name of its benefactor Christopher Ondaatje and incorporates the Winifred Holtby Memorial Prize which was presented up to 2002 for regional fiction.

== Other British regional novelists ==
Other British regional novelists:

- North of England:
  - Phyllis Bentley (1894–1977) – the West Riding of Yorkshire
  - Harold Heslop (1898–1983) – Durham
  - James Hanley (1897–1985) – Liverpool, Lancashire
  - Constance Holme (1881–1955) – Westmorland
  - Winifred Holtby (1898–1935) – East Riding of Yorkshire
  - Storm Jameson (1891–1986) – Yorkshire
  - Oliver Onions (1873–1961) – Yorkshire
  - Elizabeth Gaskell ( 1810 – 1865) – Cheshire and Lancashire
  - Howard Spring (1889–1965) – Lancashire
  - Leo Walmsley (1892–1966) – Yorkshire North coast
  - Hugh Walpole (1884–1941) – Cumberland
- Midlands:
  - H. E. Bates (1905–1974) – Northamptonshire
  - D. H. Lawrence (1885–1930) – Nottinghamshire
- West of England:
  - Mary Butts (1890 – 1937) – Dorset
  - Joseph Hocking - Cornwall
  - Winston Graham (1908–2003) – Cornwall
  - Richard Jefferies (1848 – 1887) – Wiltshire
  - Katharine Lee (Kitty Lee Jenner, 1854–1936) - Cornwall
  - Daphne du Maurier (1907–1989) – West Country
  - Eden Phillpotts (1862–1960) – Dartmoor, Devon
  - T. F. Powys ( 1875–1953) – Dorset
  - Arthur Quiller-Couch - Cornwall
  - Silas Hocking - Cornwall
- Wales
Further information: Welsh literature
  - Rhys Davies (1901–1978) – the Rhondda Valley, South Wales
  - Lewis Jones (1897–1939) – South Wales
  - Gwyn Thomas (1913–1981) – the Rhondda Valley
  - Gwyn Jones (1907–1999) – South Wales
  - Jack Jones (1884–1970) – Merthyr Tydfil, South Wales
- Scotland:
  - Lewis Grassic Gibbon (1901–1935) – The Mearns: The County of Kincardine, Scotland
  - Nan Shepherd (1893–1981) – Cairngorm Mountains, Scotland
- South East
  - East End Literature (London, England)
  - Sheila Kaye-Smith (1887–1956) – the border of Sussex and Kent

== See also ==
- American Literary Regionalism
- Criollismo in Latin America
- Nationalisms and regionalisms of Spain
- Regional literature of France

== Bibliography ==
- Bellamy, Liz, Regionalism and Nationalism: Maria Edgeworth, Walter Scott and the definition of Britishness. Cambridge: Cambridge University Press, 1998.
- Bentley, Phyllis Eleanor, The English regional novel 1894–1977. London: Allen & Unwin, [1941].
- Keith, W. J., Regions of the imagination: the development of British rural fiction. Toronto; Buffalo: University of Toronto Press, c1988.
- Pite, Ralph, Hardy's geography: Wessex and the regional novel. Palgrave, 2002.
- Radford, Andrew D., Mapping the Wessex novel: landscape, history and the parochial in British literature, 1870–1940. London; New York: Continuum International Pub., 2010.
- Snell, K. D. M., The regional novel in Britain and Ireland. 1800–1990. Cambridge: Cambridge University Press, 1998;
  - and The Bibliography of Regional Fiction in Britain and Ireland: 1800–2000. Aldershott: Ashgate, 2002.
