= Harold Jones (artist) =

British artist, illustrator and writer

Harold Jones (22 February 1904 – 1992) was a British artist, illustrator and writer of children's books. Critic Brian Alderson (children's book critic) called him "perhaps the most original children's book illustrator of the period". He established his reputation with lithographs illustrating This Year: Next Year (1937), a collection of verses by Walter de la Mare.

Jones was born in London and studied illustration there from 1920 at Goldsmiths College, under Edmund Sullivan, a former teacher of Arthur Rackham; at the Camberwell School of Arts and Crafts in 1922–1923; and then on scholarship at the Royal College of Art.

Jones's most acclaimed work was Lavender's Blue: A book of nursery rhymes (1954), a collection of nursery rhymes named for one of them, "Lavender's Blue". The British Library Association awarded Jones "Special Commendation" for the 1954 Carnegie Medal, which recognised the year's outstanding children's book written by a British subject; it provided a "major reason" for the organisation to establish its companion Kate Greenaway Medal for illustration that year (1955). Lavender's Blue, published in the U.S. by Franklin Watts in 1956, was named a Notable Book by the American Library Association and to the Lewis Carroll Shelf Award list in 1960.

The largest public archive of Harold Jones's papers and illustrations is at Seven Stories, National Centre for Children's Books (deposited by the Harold Jones estate in 2005). Other of Harold Jones's papers, deposited from 1966 to 1980, are in the de Grummond Children's Literature Collection at the University of Southern Mississippi.

== Selected works ==
=== Written and illustrated by Harold Jones ===
- The Visit to the Farm (1939)
- The Enchanted Night (1947)
- The Childhood of Jesus (1964)
- There and Back Again (1977)
- Tales from Aesop (1981)
- The Forest: Peep Show (1981)
- A Happy Christmas (1983)
- Tales to Tell (1984)

=== Books by other authors, illustrated by Harold Jones ===
- Mary Evelyn Atkinson – August Adventure (1936)
- Walter de la Mare – This Year, Next Year (1937)
- C.S. Lewis – Out of the Silent Planet (1938)
- M. E. Atkinson - The Compass Points North (1938)
- M. E. Atkinson - Crusoe Island (1941)
- M. E. Atkinson - Going Gangster (1942)
- John Pudney – Elegy for Tom Riding (1947)
- M. E. Atkinson - Smugglers' Gap (1947)
- Kathleen Lines – Four to Fourteen: A Library of Books for Children (1950)
- Kathleen Lines – Lavender’s Blue: A Book of Nursery Rhymes (1954)
- Kathleen Lines - Once in Royal David’s City: A Picture Book of the Nativity (1956)
- Henry A. Fagan - Ninya, A Fantasy of a Strange Little World (1956). May only be dust jacket illustration.
- Donald Suddaby – Prisoners of Saturn: An Interplanetary Adventure (1957)
- William Blake – Songs of Innocence (1958)
- Kathleen Lines – A Ring of Tales (1958)
- Elfrida Vipont – Bless This Day: A Book of Prayer for Children (1958)
- Kathleen Lines – Jack and the Beanstalk: A Book of Nursery Stories (1960)
- Kathleen Lines – Noah and the Ark (1961)
- Charles Kingsley – The Water Babies (text by Kathleen Lines) (1961)
- William Shakespeare – Songs from Shakespeare (1961)
- Robert Browning – The Pied Piper of Hamelin (1962)
- Five Little Pigs (Warren Editions, 1974)
- Lewis Carroll – The Hunting of the Snark (1975)
- Oscar Wilde – The Fairy Stories of Oscar Wilde (1976)
- Paul Ries Collin - Calling Bridge (1976)
- Ruth Manning-Sanders – The Town Mouse and the Country Mouse: Aesop’s Fable Retold (1977)
- Penelope Lively – The Voyage of QV66 (1978)
- Naomi Lewis – The Silent Playmate (or The Magic Doll) – A Collection of Doll Stories (1979)
- Harold Jacobs – Silver Bells and Cockle Shells: A Bunby Adventure (1979)

=== Books by other authors, with dust jacket illustrations by Harold Jones ===
- H. G. Wells - Star Begotten (UK edition)
- H. G. Wells - The Brothers (UK edition)
- H. G. Wells - The Croquet Player (UK edition)
