= Jack Lively (political scientist) =

English academic (1930–1998)

- Born: John Frederick Lively; 15 June 1930; Newcastle upon Tyne, England
- Died: 27 October 1998 (aged 68); London, England
- Education: Royal Grammar School, Newcastle upon Tyne
- Alma mater: St John's College, Cambridge
- Occupation: Political scientist
- Known for: Democracy (1975)
- Title: Professor emeritus
- Spouse: Penelope Lively (m. 1957)
- Children: 2

John Frederick Lively (15 June 1930 – 27 October 1998) was emeritus professor of politics at the University of Warwick. He is known for his influential study of democracy (1975).

== Early life and family ==
Jack Lively was born in Newcastle upon Tyne on 15 June 1930. He was educated at the Royal Grammar School, Newcastle, and then St John's College, Cambridge.

He was married to the novelist Penelope Lively.

== Career ==
Lively was professor of politics at the University of Warwick for 14 years. He was a specialist on utilitarianism and wrote an influential study of democracy.

== Death ==
Lively died in London on 27 October 1998.

== Selected publications ==
- Social and Political Thought of Alexis de Tocqueville. Clarendon Press, Oxford, 1965.
- The Enlightenment. Longmans, London, 1966.
- Democracy. Blackwell, Oxford, 1975. ISBN 0631154604
- Utilitarian Logic and Politics: James Mill's "Essay on Government". Clarendon Press, Oxford. 1978. ISBN 0198271980
- Democracy in Britain: A Reader. Blackwell, Oxford, 1994. (edited with Adam Lively)
