= According to Mark =

1984 novel by Penelope Lively

- First edition
- Author: Penelope Lively
- Cover artist: Sue Hillwood-Harris
- Language: English
- Publisher: Heinemann
- Publication date: 1984
- Publication place: United Kingdom
- Media type: Print & Audio
- Pages: 208
- ISBN: 978-0-434-42742-0

According to Mark is a 1984 novel written by Penelope Lively. It was shortlisted for Booker Prize for fiction.

== Plot ==
Mark Lamming, a biographer, leads a quiet life in London with his wife Diana, who works at a gallery. In order to gain information for a contracted biography of the dead writer and essayist Gilbert Strong, Mark visits Strong's granddaughter, Carrie. She runs a garden centre at Strong's former residence, Dean Close. Mark regularly stays at Dean Close for several days, and in the course of this falls in love with Carrie. After some time he comes up with the idea to visit Hermione, Carrie's mother who lives in France, so as to ask her some questions about the relationship between her and her father, Gilbert Strong. He asks Carrie to join him – partly because he needs her to speak to her mother and partly because he wants to spend time with her. Hesitantly Carrie agrees, and together they leave for France – Diana, Mark's wife, plans to join them later.

The trip to France turns into a fiasco. During their journey, Mark and Carrie have sex at several hotels. When they arrive at Hermione's place, Carrie becomes extremely reclusive because of the way Hermione, her mother, is treating her. Diana, who in the meantime has arrived there too, is shocked by the state the house is in, and Mark finds that, after all, Hermione is not the right person to get information from for his book. They leave Hermione's place and plan to visit several French cities and villages. As Carrie feels extremely uncomfortable while travelling with Mark and Diana, she simply leaves them without saying a word while they are in a supermarket. She travels to Paris where she gets to know Nick, an Englishman.

Back in England Carrie tells Mark that she has fallen in love with Nick. Mark and Carrie sort out their problems and Mark leaves for Porlock, a village in the south west of England where he hopes to find out more about Gilbert Strong's life. He visits a Major whose aunt Irene was associated with Strong years ago, becoming confined to stay with the Major after acquiring an ankle injury in an accident caused by the ratting activity of the Major's elderly labrador dog. To Mark's delight, the Major produces a bunch of letters that Strong wrote to Irene. These letters solve the mystery of a gap in the record of Strong's life that Mark had noticed in the materials available at Dean Court: Strong had been deeply in love with Irene, who died a short time after she had agreed to leave her husband for him. Strong had never really got over this heavy loss.

These findings enable Mark to understand what made Strong tick and why he had never in his further life been able to develop any happy long-term relationship with women. Having found out about this, Mark feels that he has all the information he needs to finish his book about Strong. He leaves Porlock and heads for London where he visits Carrie.

In the last chapter of the book, Mark is at a broadcast station where a radio transmission about Gilbert Strong is being produced.

== Characters ==
Mark Lamming is a moderately successful biographer. He lives in the suburbs of London with his wife, Diana. His modesty and reclusiveness make him seem a person people can trust in. As he is very well-educated, literate and intellectual, he feels slightly uncomfortable and even superior when faced with people like Carrie; people who have read hardly any books and who are not schooled with literature. In this specific case, concerning his relationship with Carrie, Mark tries to make up for him feeling superior to her by asking her questions about her plant business. Falling in love with Carrie confronts him with a moral dilemma: On the one hand he still admires his wife, on the other hand he cannot help thinking about Carrie.

Carrie is a naïve young woman. She is light-hearted and easy-going. When Mark tells her that he has fallen in love with her, she does not know how to react and simply accepts his advances.

Diana, Mark's wife, is an orderly person. She plans everything in advance and makes lists. Wherever she goes, her outfit is perfect. She is gifted with an exceptional memory and can recall even the most insignificant details. Carrie admires her for her well-educated and straightforward appearance.
