= The Voyage of QV66 =

1978 novel by Penelope Lively

- First edition.
- Author: Penelope Lively
- Illustrator: Harold Jones
- Language: English
- Genre: Children's novel
- Publisher: Heinemann
- Publication date: 1978
- Publication place: United Kingdom
- Media type: Print (Hardback & Paperback)
- Pages: 192 pp
- ISBN: 0-434-94898-5

The Voyage of QV66 is a 1978 children's novel by British author Penelope Lively. It is set in a strange, flooded, somewhat post-apocalyptic England devoid of people, and centres on a group of animals consisting of a dog, a cat, a cow, a horse, a pigeon, and a mysterious character named "Stanley".

== Plot ==
The characters travel in a boat (the titular QV66) with the intention of reaching London Zoo so that they can discover what Stanley is. They have a number of adventures along the way, including being joined by a parrot, several characters losing their way in a balloon, and Stanley himself getting locked in a bank vault. It is eventually revealed that Stanley is a monkey.
