= Moon Tiger =

1987 novel by Penelope Lively

- First edition
- Author: Penelope Lively
- Language: English
- Publisher: André Deutsch
- Publication date: 1987
- Publication place: United Kingdom
- Media type: Print (Hardback & Paperback)

Moon Tiger is a 1987 novel by British author Penelope Lively which spans the time before, during and after World War II. The novel won the 1987 Booker Prize. It is written from multiple points of view and moves backward and forward through time. It begins as the story of a woman who, on her deathbed, decides to write a history of the world, and develops into a story of love, incest and the desire to be recognized as an independent free thinking woman of the time.

== Plot summary ==
Claudia Hampton, a 76-year-old English woman and a professional historian, is terminally ill and is spending her last remaining moments in and out of consciousness thinking of writing a history of the world with her life as a blueprint. Her first, primordial recollections are of a father who died in World War I, and of the summer of 1920, when she was 10 and competing with her 11-year-old brother Gordon for fossils.

Claudia and Gordon are, at times throughout their lives, rivals, lovers, and best friends to each other. When the two are in their late teens they begin an incestuous relationship and find it hard to relate to almost any other person their own age. Soon, however, their college careers and other events allow both to open up to the outside world, and look outward for companionship.

At the outset of World War II, Gordon, a would-be economist, is sent to India, whereas Claudia sets aside her studies in history to become a war correspondent. Independent and enterprising, Claudia talks her way into a correspondent's post in Cairo, where she meets Tom Southern, a captain of an English armoured tank division, who sweeps her off her feet.

Tom and Claudia fall in love during several long weekends together while he is on leave from the front. But their future together is never to materialize: shortly after their time together, the English are called to defend Egypt from Erwin Rommel's offensive at the First Battle of El Alamein, and Tom is declared missing. Later on, Claudia receives news that he has been killed.

Shortly after Tom's death, Claudia finds out she is pregnant, and decides that she will have the child, even though she would have to raise it alone. It isn't to be: Claudia miscarries, and is never told whether the child she had carried was a boy or a girl. That uncertainty, along with her fear that Tom died a horrible and painful death, will haunt her for the rest of her life.

After the War, Claudia and Gordon reunite, but the encounter is more friendly than passionate. Each of them has obviously been changed by the War, but they are both sparse on actual details during their conversations. Gordon marries a girl named Sylvia, whom Claudia finds insipid and boring. Claudia meanwhile met Jasper, a well connected young man with whom she goes on to have an on-and-off, rather stormy relationship, and one that Gordon openly disapproves of.

In 1948 Claudia finds herself pregnant again, this time by Jasper, and while she has no intention of marrying him, she decides to have the child, Lisa. While Claudia loves Lisa, she finds she has little patience and time to care for a child, and so Lisa ultimately ends up being raised by her maternal and paternal grandmothers, who share her custody and dictate her upbringing. Not surprisingly, Lisa grows up sullen and indifferent to Claudia, and marries a respectable (boring) man at a young age.

After reading an article Claudia has written condemning the Soviet invasion, a Hungarian functionary who becomes implicated in the 1956 Hungarian Revolution contacts Claudia out of the blue. Knowing that he will soon be imprisoned, the functionary decides to ask Claudia to make sure that his son Laszlo, who is in England at art college, does not attempt to return to Hungary. Claudia becomes a sort of surrogate mother to Laszlo, whom she grows to love and admire over the years, recognizing that he is drastically different from anyone else she knows: an open, painfully honest, sensitive, self-destructive artist.

Claudia writes several popular history books, earning accolades from the public and occasional scorn from academic historians. She also briefly becomes a consultant for a film based on her history of the Spanish invasion of Mexico, which leads to a personal scandal when she is in a car accident with the star of the movie, and the press suspects there is more to the relationship than just friendship. The event earns scorn from Jasper, who refuses to see her when she is in the hospital. Gordon, on the other hand, visits her to let her know that she is not alone.

Later in life, Claudia decides to travel to Egypt alone but finds it much changed. Yet the desert brings back powerful memories of her intense love for Tom Southern and enduring pain at his death, a pain she is still unable to share with anyone else even after all the years that have passed.

Shortly thereafter, Gordon dies, and leaves a gaping void in Claudia's life. A few years later, when she is diagnosed with cancer, and knowing her own death is imminent, she apologizes to Lisa for having been a cold and distant mother. Lisa accepts the apology, but is not sure how to feel about it: it is the most unlikely thing Claudia (who to Lisa seemed to revel in being an almost omnipotent figure) has ever done for Lisa.

Long after the War, Tom's sister Jennifer reads an article Claudia wrote about her experiences in Egypt, realizes she is the "C." Tom had often referred to in letters home, and mails Claudia his wartime diary. Soon before she dies, Claudia asks Laszlo to fetch Tom's diary for her. Reading over the short entries in Tom's diary, many of which refer to his love for her, Claudia allows herself to reflect on her grief for Tom, her sorrow at having been left behind, and the course her life might have taken had he survived. She comes to peace with the fact that she too will soon become a set of imperfect memories of those who knew her. The next day, Claudia dies.
