= The Ghost of Thomas Kempe =

1973 fantasy novel by Penelope Lively

- First edition
- Author: Penelope Lively
- Illustrator: Anthony Maitland
- Language: English
- Genre: Children's fantasy novel, supernatural fiction
- Publisher: Heinemann (UK); E. P. Dutton (US)
- Publication date: 26 March 1973
- Publication place: United Kingdom
- Media type: Print (hardcover & paperback)
- Pages: 156 pp (first edition)
- ISBN: 0-434-94894-2 (US)
- OCLC: 673929
- LC Class: PZ7.L7397 Gh

The Ghost of Thomas Kempe is a low fantasy novel for children by Penelope Lively, first published by Heinemann in 1973 with illustrations by Anthony Maitland. Set in present-day Oxfordshire, it features a boy and his modern family who are new in their English village, and seem beset by a poltergeist. Soon the boy makes acquaintance with the eponymous Thomas Kempe, ghost of a 17th-century resident sorcerer who intends to stay.

Lively won the annual Carnegie Medal from the Library Association, recognising the year's best children's book by a British subject. (Note: Penelope Lively also won the 1987 Booker Prize, recognising Moon Tiger as the year's best novel. She is the only author to win both of the most prestigious British book awards, which have covered books for children from 1937 and novels for adults from 1968. Nationality conditions have varied.)

== Characters ==
Major characters

- James Harrison, the main character
- Mrs Harrison, James's mother
- Mr Harrison, James's father
- Helen Harrison, James's sister
- Tim the dog
- Thomas Kempe, the poltergeist who troubles James

Minor characters

- Simon, James's friend
- Bert, the local handyman who tries to deal with the poltergeist
- Mrs Verity, an old lady whom Thomas Kempe accuses of being a witch
- Arnold, a Victorian boy who experienced the ghost before James
- Aunt Fanny, Arnold's aunt
- Mr Hollings, James's teacher
- The vicar
- Julia, Helen's friend

== Themes ==
An interest in history, the passage of time and local change is a running theme in the work of Penelope Lively and can be seen in many of her books. Beside Mr Kempe from the 17th century, this story involves both a 20th-century resident of the cottage and the history of the surrounding countryside.

== Adaptations ==
In 1978, a film was made based on the novel, which aired on the ABC Weekend Special, a showcase for a variety of different films aimed at children. The film was re-broadcast many times over the years, and has had several releases on home video, and is currently hosted on YouTube. The book was also read on BBC's Jackanory. In 1977, a radio play version was aired over a number of weeks on Australia's ABC radio. In 1978 the book was adapted as a radio play by the Norwegian Broadcasting Corporation.

== Notes ==
Awards
Preceded by Watership Down	Carnegie Medal recipient 1973	Succeeded by The Stronghold
