= Adam Lively =

British novelist

Adam Lively (born 20 January 1961) is a British novelist.

He was born in Swansea and educated in England and America. His debut novel Blue Fruit was published in 1988. In 1993, he was included in the Granta Best of Young British Novelists list.

Lively is the son of Booker Prize–winning novelist, Penelope Lively.

Lively has also worked as a producer/director of TV documentaries and reviews fiction for The Sunday Times newspaper.

== Selected works ==
- Blue Fruit (1988)
- The Burnt House (1989) TCT
- Parliament: The Great British Democracy Swindle (1990) (pamphlet)
- The Snail (1991)
- Sing the Body Electric (1993)
- Democracy in Britain: A Reader (1994) (with Jack Lively)
- Masks: Blackness, Race and the Imagination (1998) (history/criticism)
