= Regional literature of France =

The Regional literature of France, besides literature written in the French language, may include literature written in other languages of France. In the medieval period many of the competing standard languages in various territories that later came to make up the territory of modern France each produced literary traditions, such as Anglo-Norman literature and Provençal literature.

Literature in the regional languages continued through to the 18th century, although increasingly eclipsed by the rise of the French language and influenced by the prevailing French literary model. Conscious language revival movements in the 19th century, such as Félibrige in Provence, coupled with wider literacy and regional presses, enabled a new flowering of literary production in the Norman language and others.

Frédéric Mistral, a poet in Occitan (1830–1914), was awarded the Nobel Prize in Literature in 1904.

Breton literature since the 1920s has been lively, despite the falling number of speakers. In 1925, Roparz Hemon founded the periodical Gwalarn which for 19 years tried to raise the language to the level of other great "international" languages by creating original works covering all genres and by proposing Breton translations of internationally recognized foreign works. In 1946, Al Liamm took up the role of Gwalam. Other reviews came into existence and gave Breton a fairly large body of literature for a minority language. Among writers in Breton are Yann-Ber Kalloc'h, Anjela Duval and Per-Jakez Hélias.

Picard literature maintains a level of literary output, especially in theatrical writing. Walloon literature is bolstered by the more significant literary production in the language in Belgium.

Catalan literature and literature in the Basque language also benefit from the existence of a readership outside the borders of France.
