= A Stitch in Time (Lively novel) =

1976 children's novel by Penelope Lively

- British edition cover
- Author: Penelope Lively
- Language: English
- Publisher: Heinemann
- Publication date: 1976
- Publication place: United Kingdom
- Pages: 139
- ISBN: 9780434948970
- OCLC: 906166114

A Stitch in Time is a 1976 children's novel by British writer Penelope Lively. It won the 1976 Whitbread Award for children's book. 40 years later, it was re-published by Collins under the modern classics range.

The book follows Maria Foster during a summer holiday in Lyme Regis. She begins to hear sounds that no one else can and connects with a Victorian girl called Harriet, but as she becomes more immersed in Harriet's world she wonders if something tragic took place.
