= Penelope Lively =

British novelist (born 1933)

Dame Penelope Lively DBE FRSL
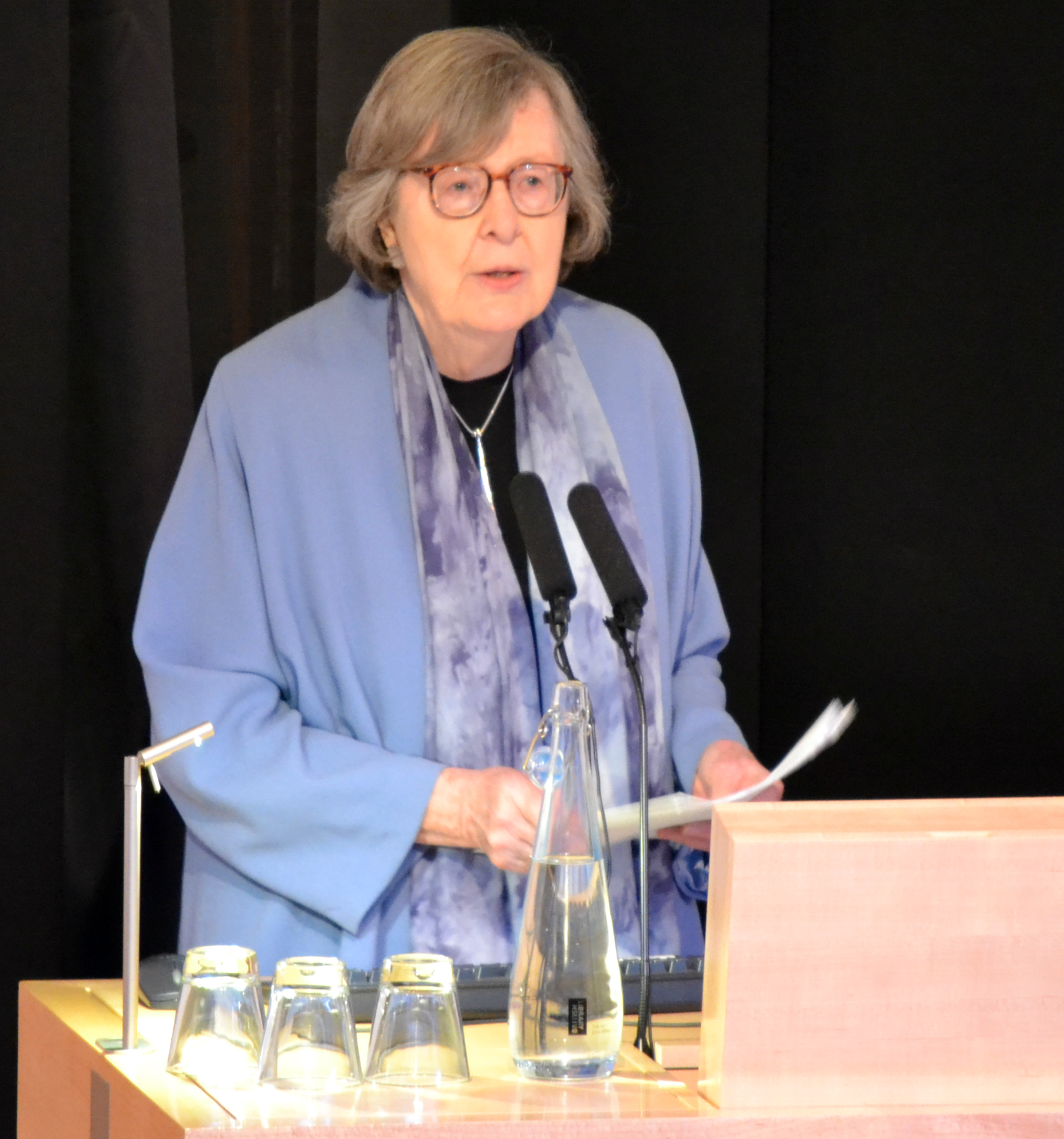
- Lively in 2013
- Born: Penelope Margaret Low; 17 March 1933 (age 93); Cairo, Egypt
- Education: St Anne's College, Oxford
- Occupation: Writer
- Spouse: Jack Lively (m. 1957; died 1998)
- Children: 2, including Adam Lively
- Relatives: Valentine Low (half-brother); Rachel Reckitt (aunt)
- Writing career
- Language: English
- Period: 1970–present
- Genres: Novels, short stories, children's fiction (notably contemporary fantasy)
- Notable awards: Carnegie Medal; 1973; Booker Prize; 1987
- Website: penelopelively.co.uk

Dame Penelope Margaret Lively DBE FRSL (née Low; born 17 March 1933) is a British writer of fiction for both children and adults. Lively has won both the Booker Prize (Moon Tiger, 1987) and the Carnegie Medal for British children's books (The Ghost of Thomas Kempe, 1973).

== Children's fiction ==
Lively first achieved success with children's fiction. Her first book, Astercote, was published by Heinemann in 1970. It is a low fantasy novel set in a Cotswolds village and the neighbouring woodland site of a medieval village wiped out by Plague.

Lively published more than twenty books for children, achieving particular recognition with The Ghost of Thomas Kempe and A Stitch in Time. For the former she won the 1973 Carnegie Medal from the Library Association, recognising the year's best children's book by a British subject. For the latter she won the 1976 Whitbread Children's Book Award. The three novels feature local history, roughly 600, 300, and 100 years past, in ways that approach time slip but do not posit travel to the past.

== Adult works ==
Lively's novel Going Back was initially published as a children's book, because up to then she had only written books for children. The story is largely set during World War II at a country house where a local man is a conscientious objector and a young boy and his sister meet the man and discuss aspects of the war. Superficially the sustained focus on the boy and girl make it seem suitable for children, and there is no sex or bad language that would make it more appropriate for adults. But this long-ago story of the children during World War II is being remembered by the sister when she is a grown up woman, returning to the country house. Although this is not highlighted in the novel, by the end of the World War II remembering, the woman makes a powerful emotional connection with how she and her brother responded to their friend deciding to set aside his pacifist objections and join the military, and this memory from World War II is suddenly linked with her recollection of herself as a young adult, grieving when her brother was killed serving in the military during the Korean War. The importance of these adult memories later resulted in Going Back being reissued as an adult novel after Lively began to establish a new reputation as a writer for adults. Going Back is a novel that defies categories, as is her later novel The House in Norham Gardens, with the central character being an orphan teenager. Published as a children's book, it is better categorised as for "Young Adults", and the two important elderly maiden great-aunts who are raising the teenager make much of the book "adult" in many ways.

Lively's first novel expressly published for adults, The Road to Lichfield, was published in 1977 and made the shortlist for the Booker Prize. She repeated the feat in 1984 with According to Mark, and won the 1987 prize for Moon Tiger, which tells the story of a woman's tempestuous life as she lies dying in a hospital bed. As with all of Lively's fiction, Moon Tiger is marked by close attention to the power of memory, the impact of the past upon the present, and the tensions between "official" and personal histories.

She explored the same themes more explicitly in her non-fiction works, including A House Unlocked (2001) and Oleander, Jacaranda: A Childhood Perceived (1994), a memoir of her Egyptian childhood. Her latest non-fiction work Ammonites & Leaping Fish: A Life in Time, (latterly known as Dancing Fish and Ammonites: A Memoir) was published in 2013.

Besides novels and short stories, Lively has also written radio and television scripts, presented a radio programme, and contributed reviews and articles to various newspapers and journals.

== Personal life ==
Lively married academic and political theorist Jack Lively in 1957. They had a son and a daughter. Her husband died in 1998. She currently lives in London. Her house contains paintings, woodcuts and Egyptian potsherds.

The journalist Valentine Low is Lively's half-brother.

== Honours ==
Lively is a Fellow of the Royal Society of Literature. She is also a vice-president of the Friends of the British Library. She was appointed Officer of the Order of the British Empire (OBE) in 1989, Commander of the Order of the British Empire (CBE) in 2001, and Dame Commander of the Order of the British Empire (DBE) in the 2012 New Year Honours for services to literature.

Lively was shortlisted for the Booker Prize: once in 1977 for her first novel, The Road to Lichfield, and again in 1984 for According to Mark. She won the 1987 Booker Prize for her novel Moon Tiger.

In 2023, Lively was honoured by the introduction of a rose with her namesake: Penelope Lively Rose. Lively has written, “The two central activities in my life – alongside writing – have been reading and gardening.” The aroma of the rose is described as medium-strong, old rose and fruity.

== Books ==
=== Fiction for children ===
- Astercote (1970)
- The Whispering Knights (1971)
- The Wild Hunt of Hagworthy (1971)
- The Driftway (1972)
- The Ghost of Thomas Kempe (1973) – Carnegie Medal
- The House in Norham Gardens (1974)
- Going Back (1975)
- Boy Without a Name (1975)
- A Stitch in Time (1976) – Whitbread Children's Book Award
- The Stained Glass Window (1976), illustrated by Michael Pollard
- Fanny's Sister (1976)
- The Voyage of QV66 (1978)
- Fanny and the Monsters (1979)
- Fanny and the Battle of Potter's Piece (1980)
- The Revenge of Samuel Stokes (1981)
- Uninvited Ghosts and other stories (1984), collection
- Dragon Trouble (1984), illus. Valerie Littlewood
- Debbie and the Little Devil (1987)
- A House Inside Out (1987)
- Princess by Mistake (1993)
- Judy and the Martian (1993)
- The Cat, the Crow and the Banyan Tree (1994), illus. Terry Milne
- Good Night, Sleep Tight (1995), illus. Adriano Gon
- Two Bears and Joe (1995), illus. Jan Ormerod
- Staying with Grandpa (1995)
- A Martian Comes to Stay (1995)
- The Disastrous Dog (1995), illus. Robert Bartlett
- Ghostly Guests (1997)
- One, Two, Three ... Jump! (1998), illus. Jan Ormerod
- Dragon Trouble (1999), new edition illus. Andrew Rowland
- In Search of a Homeland: The Story of The Aeneid (2001), illus. Ian Andrew

=== Fiction for adults ===
- The Road to Lichfield (1977) – Booker Prize finalist
- Nothing Missing but the Samovar, and other stories (1978), collection – Southern Arts Literature Prize
- Treasures of Time (1979) – Arts Council National Book Award
- Judgment Day (1980)
- Next to Nature, Art (1982)
- Perfect Happiness (1983)
- Corruption, and other stories (1984), collection
- According to Mark (1984) – Booker Prize finalist
- Pack of Cards, collected short stories 1978–1986 (1986), collection
- Moon Tiger (1987) – Booker Prize; Whitbread finalist
- Passing On (1989)
- City of the Mind (1991)
- Cleopatra's Sister (1993)
- Heat Wave (1996)
- Beyond the Blue Mountains (1997), collection (U.S. title: The Five Thousand and One Nights)
- Spiderweb (1998)
- The Photograph (2003)
- Making it up (2005)
- Consequences (2007)
- Family Album (2009) – Costa finalist
- How It All Began (2011)
- The Purple Swamp Hen and Other stories (2017)
- Metamorphosis (2021), collection

=== Non-fiction ===
- The Presence of the Past: An Introduction to Landscape History (1976)
- Oleander, Jacaranda: A Childhood Perceived (1994), autobiographical
- A House Unlocked (2001), autobiographical
- Ammonites and Leaping Fish (2013), memoir (subsequently Dancing Fish and Ammonites: A Memoir)
- Life in the Garden (2018), memoir
