= Passing On =

1989 novel by Penelope Lively

- First edition (publ. André Deutsch)
- Author: Penelope Lively
- Language: English
- Publisher: André Deutsch
- Publication date: 1989
- Publication place: United Kingdom
- Media type: Print (Hardback & Paperback)

Passing On is a novel written by Penelope Lively and published in 1989. It tells the sensitive and intimate story of how a brother and sister’s lives change after their imperious mother dies. The story is set in the South of England in the late eighties.

== Plot ==
The book starts with the funeral of Dorothy Glover, mother of Helen, Edward, and Louise. From the very beginning of the book it is clear that Dorothy was a cold and self-absorbed parent. Rather than treat her children with love and affection, she tended to resent and bully them. Only Louise, her youngest daughter, had had the strength to escape from her dominant influence. During the priest's sermon at the grave, Helen thinks: "Eternal life is an appalling idea, especially in mother’s case." In her will, Dorothy leaves her house not to Helen and Edward, who have lived there and cared for her, but to their teenaged nephew. This is ostensibly to avoid some inheritance tax, but as in fact the savings are negligible, it appears to be rather a manifestation of Dorothy's grudging, manipulative character.

Slowly but steadily, Helen and Edward get used to their mother’s absence and they start to slightly change their lives. Helen feels much freer than before her mother's death and falls in love with Giles Carnaby, their lawyer. She becomes more confident and starts to perceive life differently. Nevertheless, Dorothy, even after her death, makes her presence felt. At one point, Helen finds love-letters that a former boyfriend had written to her in one of her mother's old cloaks. Her mother had never given these letters to her and therefore had caused the separation of Helen and her boyfriend. Helen is upset, but she comes to terms with it.

Edward is a teacher at a local girls' school. His mother’s death does not change much about his life - he remains as reclusive as he had been before she died. He spends most of his leisure time in the Britches, the wood that is part of the estate where he and Helen live. There he tends plants and watches birds. In the course of the book he is revealed to be homosexual, and Helen helps Edward through what seems to be a life crisis, thus reinforcing her own sense of self and strength.

Helen and Edward live modestly. They only buy what they absolutely need; their lifestyle is rather old-fashioned. This is in stark contrast to the life their sister Louise and her husband Tom lead in London, who every once in a while drop in on Helen and Edward. Louise and Tom's problems are those typical of people that live in big cities: lack of time and psycho-somatic illnesses. Helen and Edward, by contrast, lead a calm, monotonous and rather rural life.

Ron Paget, a wealthy builder who owns the yard next to the Britches, has spent years prodding first Dorothy, and then Helen and Edward to sell him their land. Like the other villagers, he cannot understand why they cling to an undeveloped plot of land rather than sell it to improve their lifestyle. Ron Paget's materialistic outlook and lack of regard for conservation reflects trends in modern British life which the Glovers resist. Although Dorothy's resistance seems to have stemmed from mere obstinacy, Edward's comes from a desperate desire to save the wildlife, and Helen's from respect for Edward's feelings.

Throughout the book it seems as though Helen and Giles Carnaby, the lawyer, will end up in a happy relationship. This does not happen, as Giles turns out to be something of a philanderer; but the relationship seems beneficial to Helen as she forces herself to take an active role in breaking it off, rather than letting events take their course passively as when her mother was alive,

== Characters ==
Helen Glover is a modest woman who lives together with her younger brother, Edward. She works as a librarian, a job that she enjoys. After her mother's death she cannot quite forget her mother and still feels her presence. For example, whenever she is about to make an important decision she seems to hear her mother making dismissive remarks.

Edward Glover, Helen's brother, is a very reclusive man. He is an ardent conservationist who feels strong empathy toward threatened animals. He teaches at a girls' school and devotes his spare time to looking after the ecology of the Britches, a plot of land he and Helen have inherited from their mother.

Dorothy Glover is Helen, Edward, and Louise's mother. The book opens with her funeral, but her children continue to feel her presence for some time after her death. She never showed affection to her children, ruling them with a rod of iron and a violent temper. Her children's feelings toward her are ambiguous; Helen once reflects, “I am her daughter and so in the nature of things came nearer to loving her than anyone else did.”

Louise Dyson, Helen and Edward's sister, lives a life very different to that of her siblings. In contrast to her brother and her sister, she managed to flee from her mother's domination when she was a teenager. She is married to Tim, and they have two teenage children, Phil and Suzanne.

Giles Carnaby, a widowed lawyer who is in charge of managing Dorothy's legacy, becomes friends with Helen.

Ron Paget, the owner of a builder's yard across from the Britches, has an expansive and materialistic temperament that contrasts with the modest Glovers. Throughout the novel he tries different ways to persuade Helen and Edward to sell him their land, even resorting to blackmail.
