= City of the Mind =

1991 novel by Penelope Lively

- First edition
- Author: Penelope Lively
- Language: English
- Publisher: Deutsch
- Publication date: 1991
- Publication place: United Kingdom
- Media type: Print
- Pages: 220
- ISBN: 0233986618

City of the Mind is a 1991 novel written by Penelope Lively. It is an introspective novel which offers an attempt to explain the varying and complex relationships between the past and the present.

== Plot ==
Through the daily life and thoughts of Matthew Halland, a recently divorced architect suffering from his relationship with his own past the reader is introduced to various characters he meets during his travels around London and given glimpses of the city's past and the relevance of that past to the present. The presence in his life of his young daughter Jane and the promise of renewed romance with a woman he encounters by chance serve to save him from descending into loneliness and despair.
