= Bluegate Fields =

Slum in Victorian London

Coordinates: 51°30′37″N 0°03′22″W

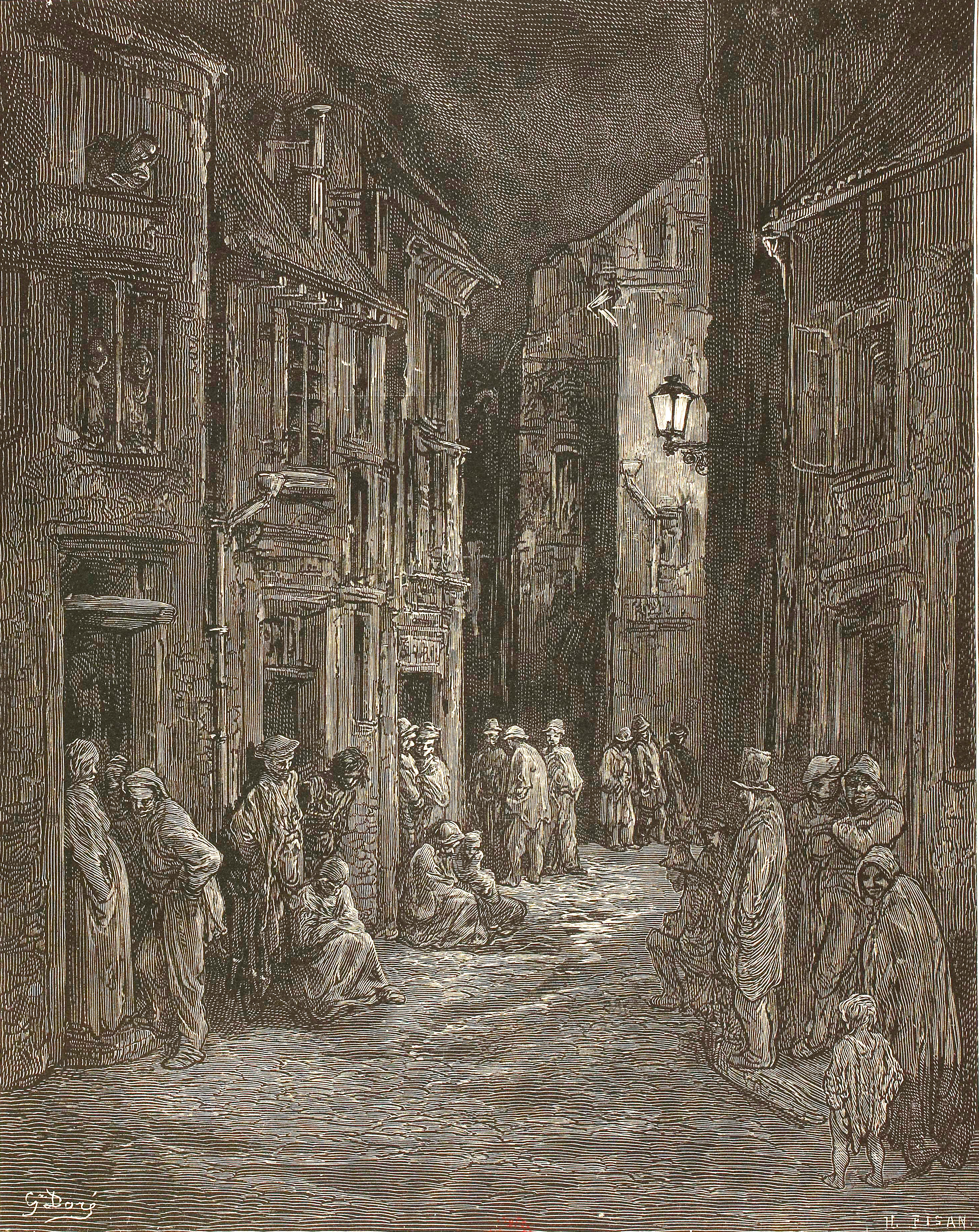
Bluegate Fields in 1872, by Gustave Doré.

Bluegate Fields (also known as Blue Gate Fields) was one of the worst slum areas that once existed just north of the east London docks during the Victorian era. Two streets in the area had actually been named Bluegate Fields at different times: present-day Dellow Street (along the eastern edge of the St George in the East churchyard and Cable Street (along the northern edge of the churchyard).

The area is visited by the eponymous character in The Picture of Dorian Gray (1890) by Oscar Wilde, and inspired a scene in The Mystery of Edwin Drood (1870) by Charles Dickens. It also features in Arthur Morrison's novel The Hole In The Wall, published 1902 but set in an earlier decade. It is referenced in the title of a song (and live album recorded at Wilton's Music Hall in Graces Alley off Cable Street) by Marc Almond. It provided the title for Anne Perry's mystery novel Bluegate Fields, published in 1984.
