= Simon Blumenfeld =

Simon Blumenfeld (25 November 1907 – 13 April 2005) was a British columnist, novelist, playwright, theatre critic and editor.

Although he described himself as Jewish, he was born to a family of Sicilian refugees, who eventually settled in Whitechapel, in the East End of London. In the late 1930s he authored four books beginning with Jew Boy (1935), "the first in what became a genre of East End-based 'proletarian novels".

During World War II he served in the Royal Army Ordnance Corps as an expert in German munitions, before becoming a scriptwriter for Stars in Battledress, an army talent show.

At the end of the war he founded the entertainment magazine Band Wagon, with Norman Kark. He adopted a number of pseudonyms for his writing, including Sidney Vauncez (the Yiddish word for moustache), CV Curtis, and Peter Simon. He founded the Weekly Sporting Review, which collapsed when sued for libel by the managers of Tommy Steele; and then Record Mirror with Benny Green.

Simon Blumenfeld died at Barnet Hospital in North London on 13 April 2005, at the age of 97. He had maintained his writing output until a few weeks before his passing, and his name was listed in the Guinness Book of Records as the 'World's Oldest Columnist'. He was cremated at Golders Green Crematorium, where a memorial plaque remains in the 'communist corner'.

== Works ==
=== Novels ===
- Jew Boy - published in the US as The Iron Garden (1932) [reprinted: Lawrence and Wishart, 1986; London Books, 2011 (with an introduction by Ken Worpole)]
- Phineas Kahn: Portrait of an Immigrant (1937) [reprinted by Lawrence and Wishart, 1987, with an introduction by Steven Berkoff, and by London Books, 2019, with an introduction by Peter Mason]
- Doctor of the Lost (1938) [republished by London Books, 2013, with an introduction by Paolo Hewitt]
- They Won't Let You Live (1939) [republished by London Books, 2022]
- The Catalones Bandit (1947) [as Huck Messer (Yiddish: carving knife)]

=== Plays ===
- The Battle of Cable Street (1987)

=== Editor and columnist ===
- Band Wagon
- Weekly Sporting Review
- Record Mirror
- The Stage

== Personal ==
Simon was married to Deborah Blumenfeld, who died in 1960. They had two children, son Eric and daughter Sheba.
