= 1555 =

1555 in various calendars
- Gregorian calendar: 1555; MDLV
- Ab urbe condita: 2308
- Armenian calendar: 1004; ԹՎ ՌԴ
- Assyrian calendar: 6305
- Balinese saka calendar: 1476–1477
- Bengali calendar: 961–962
- Berber calendar: 2505
- English Regnal year: 1 Ph. & M. – 2 Ph. & M.
- Buddhist calendar: 2099
- Burmese calendar: 917
- Byzantine calendar: 7063–7064
- Chinese calendar: 甲寅年 (Wood Tiger); 4252 or 4045 — to — 乙卯年 (Wood Rabbit); 4253 or 4046
- Coptic calendar: 1271–1272
- Discordian calendar: 2721
- Ethiopian calendar: 1547–1548
- Hebrew calendar: 5315–5316
- Hindu calendars
- Vikram Samvat: 1611–1612
- Shaka Samvat: 1476–1477
- Kali Yuga: 4655–4656
- Holocene calendar: 11555
- Igbo calendar: 555–556
- Iranian calendar: 933–934
- Islamic calendar: 962–963
- Japanese calendar: Tenbun 24 / Kōji 1 (弘治元年)
- Javanese calendar: 1473–1475
- Julian calendar: 1555; MDLV
- Korean calendar: 3888
- Minguo calendar: 357 before ROC 民前357年
- Nanakshahi calendar: 87
- Thai solar calendar: 2097–2098
- Tibetan calendar: ཤིང་ཕོ་སྟག་ལོ་ (male Wood-Tiger); 1681 or 1300 or 528 — to — ཤིང་མོ་ཡོས་ལོ་ (female Wood-Hare); 1682 or 1301 or 529

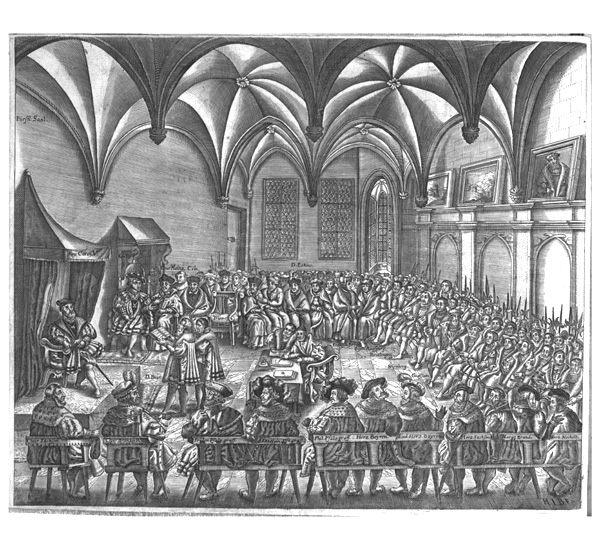
September 25: The Peace of Augsburg is signed

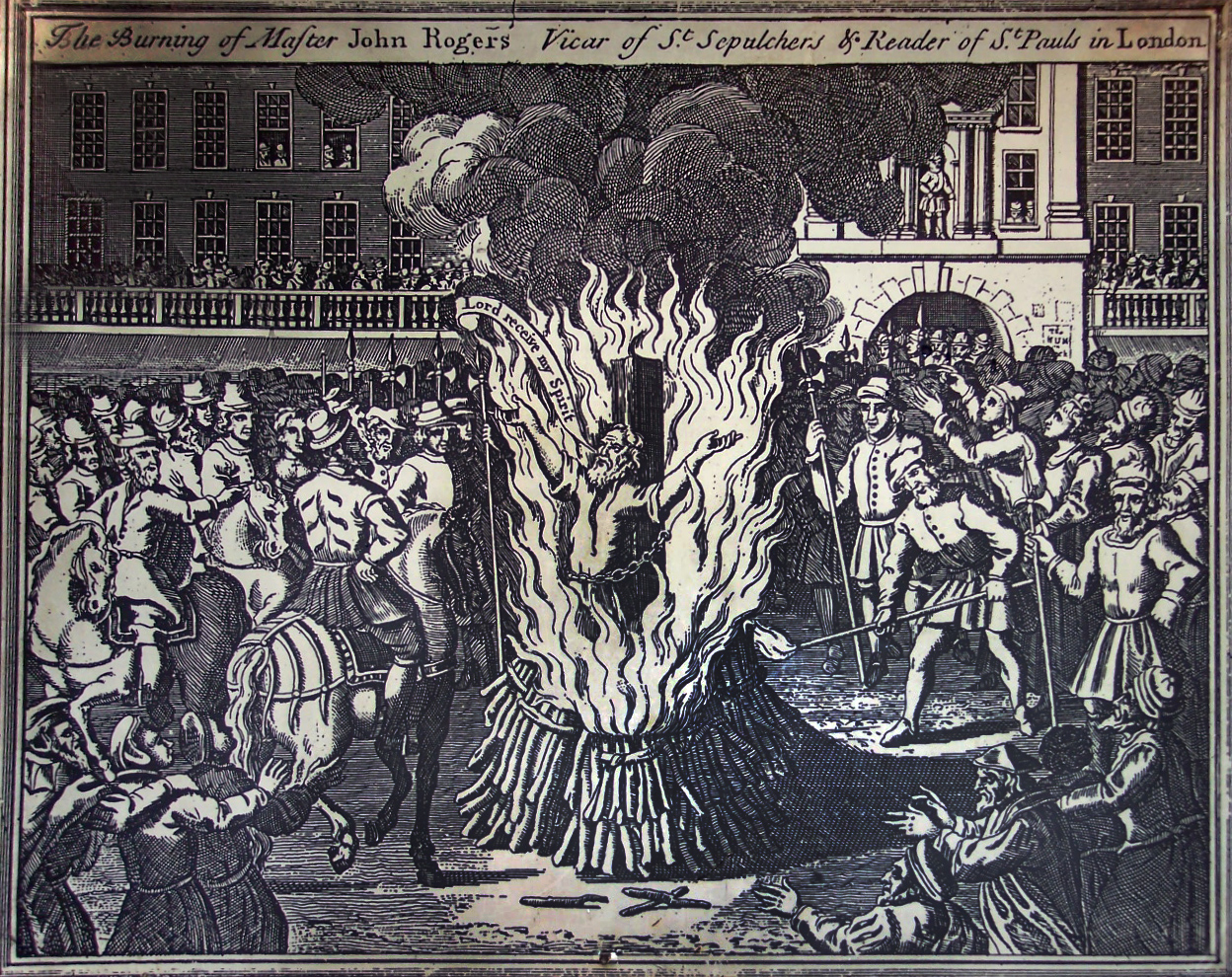
February 4: John Rogers is burned at the stake.

1555 (MDLV) was a common year starting on Tuesday of the Julian calendar.

== Events ==
=== January–March ===
- January 22 – The Kingdom of Ava in Upper Burma falls.
- February 2 – The Diet of Augsburg begins.
- February 4 – John Rogers is burned at the stake at Smithfield, London, becoming the first of the 284 Protestant martyrs of the English Reformation to be killed during the five and one-half year reign of Queen Mary I of England. His death is followed within the week by that of Laurence Saunders on February 8 in Coventry, and Rowland Taylor, Rector of Hadleigh, Suffolk, and John Hooper, deposed Bishop of Gloucester on February 9.
- February 26 – The Muscovy Company is chartered in England to trade with the Tsardom of Russia and Richard Chancellor negotiates with the Tsar.
- March 25 – Valencia, Venezuela, is founded by Captain Alonso Díaz Moreno.

=== April–June ===
- April 9 – Marcello Cervini degli Spannocchi is unanimously chosen as the successor to Pope Julius III, who died on March 23, and takes the name of Pope Marcellus II as the 222nd Pontiff of the Roman Catholic Church. He will reign for 22 days.
- April 17 – After 18 months of siege, the Republic of Siena surrenders to the Florentine–Imperial army.
- May 1 – Foundation of St John's College, Oxford, England, to teach Catholic theology.
- May 30 – Foundation of Trinity College, Oxford, England, to teach Catholic theology.
- May 15 – The conclave opens with 42 of the 56 Roman Catholic cardinals to choose a successor to Pope Marcellus II, who had died on May 1.
- May 23 – Giovanni Pietro Carafa, Cardinal of Naples, is elected as the new Pope after Giacomo del Pozzo fails to obtain the necessary two-thirds approval. Carafa, the 223rd Pope, takes the name Pope Paul IV.
- May 25 – Jeanne d'Albret becomes the Queen of Navarre upon the death of her father, King Henry II.
- June 1 – The Treaty of Amasya between the Ottoman Empire and Safavid Persia concludes the Ottoman-Safavid War.
- June 22 – Adil Shah Suri becomes the Sultan of the Sur Empire at Delhi in India after Sikandar Shah Suri is forced to flee from the Mughal Empire forces.

=== July–September ===
- July 12 – Pope Paul IV creates the Roman Ghetto, the first Jewish ghetto in Rome.
- August 24 – England's Thomas Thirlby, the first and only Roman Catholic Archbishop of Norwich and Queen Mary's envoy to Pope Paul IV, returns to London from bearing a papal bull that confirms Queen Mary's jurisdiction over Ireland.
- September 25 – The Peace of Augsburg is signed between Charles V, Holy Roman Emperor, and the Lutheran Schmalkaldic League, establishing the principle Cuius regio, eius religio, that is, rulers within the Empire can choose the religion of their realm.
- September – The 1555 Kashmir earthquake causes widespread destruction and death in Kashmir, India.

=== October–December ===
- October 16
  - (1st day of 10th month Tenbun 24) – At the Battle of Miyajima Island, Mori Motonari defeats Sue Harukata.
  - The first two Protestant Oxford Martyrs, Hugh Latimer and Nicholas Ridley, are burned at the stake in England.
- October 25 – Charles V abdicates as Holy Roman Emperor and is succeeded by his brother Ferdinand.
- November 1 – French Navy Vice-Admiral Nicolas Durand de Villegaignon leads a small fleet of two ships and 200 soldiers and colonists to take possession of Serigipe Island, near modern-day Rio de Janeiro in Brazil at Guanabara Bay, and builds Fort Coligny.
- November 13 – Thomas Cranmer is officially removed from office as the Protestant Archbishop of Canterbury by order of Pope Paul IV and Queen Mary I.
- December 11 – Cardinal Reginald Pole is made a cardinal-priest in the Roman Catholic Church and made the administrator of the See of Canterbury in England, though he will not become the new Archbishop of Canterbury until the following March 20.

=== Date unknown ===
- Russia breaks a 60-year-old truce with Sweden by attacking Finland.
- Humayun resumes rule of the Mughal Empire.
- The Adal Sultanate in the Horn of Africa collapses.
- English captain John Lok returns from Guinea, with five Africans to train as interpreters for future trading voyages.
- Richard Eden publishes The Decades of the Newe Worlde or West India, a translation into English of parts of Pietro Martire d'Anghiera's De orbe novo decades, the Gonzalo Fernández de Oviedo y Valdés work Natural hystoria de las Indias and others, urging his countrymen to follow the lead of Spain in exploring the New World; the work includes the first recorded use in English of the country name 'China'.
- Establishment in England of the following grammar schools: Boston Grammar School, Gresham's School at Holt, Norfolk (founded by Sir John Gresham) and Ripon Grammar School (re-foundation).
- William Annyas becomes the Mayor of Youghal, Ireland, the first Jew to hold such a position in Ireland.
- John Dee is charged, but cleared, of treason in England.
- Orlande de Lassus' first book of madrigals is published, in Antwerp.

== Births ==
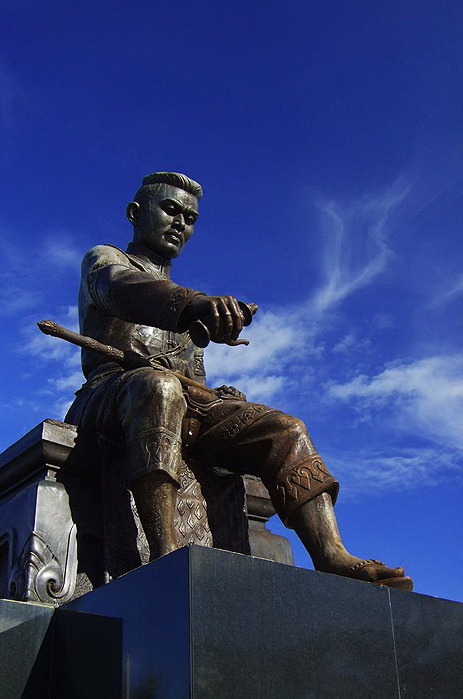
King Naresuan

- January 26 – Charles II, Lord of Monaco (d. 1589)
- February 25 – Alonso Lobo, Spanish musician (d. 1617)
- March 18 – François, Duke of Anjou, youngest son of Henry II of France and Catherine de' Medici (d. 1584)
- March 21 – John Leveson, English politician (d. 1615)
- March 31 – Elizabeth Stuart, Countess of Lennox, English countess (d. 1582)
- April 21 – Ludovico Carracci, Italian painter (d. 1619)
- April 28 – Karl Friedrich of Jülich-Cleves-Berg, heir apparent of Jülich-Cleves-Berg (d. 1575)
- May 5 – Queen Uiin, Korean royal consort (d. 1600)
- May 9 – Jerónima de la Asunción, founder of the first Catholic monastery in Manila, the Monastery of Santa Clara (d. 1630)
- May 29 – George Carew, 1st Earl of Totnes, English earl, general and administrator (d. 1629)
- June 11 – Lodovico Zacconi, Italian composer and music theorist (d. 1627)
- June 13 – Giovanni Antonio Magini, Italian mathematician, cartographer and astronomer (d. 1617)
- June 16 – Duke Otto Henry of Brunswick-Harburg, Hereditary Prince of Brunswick-Lüneburg-Harburg (d. 1591)
- July – Henry Garnet, English Jesuit (d. 1606)
- July 6 – Louis II, Cardinal of Guise, French Catholic cardinal (d. 1588)
- July 17 – Richard Carew, English scholar (d. 1620)
- August 1 – Edward Kelley, English spirit medium (d. 1597)
- September 3 – Jan Zbigniew Ossoliński, Polish nobleman (d. 1628)
- September 21 – John Thynne, English landowner and politician (d. 1604)
- September 23 – Louise de Coligny, princess consort of Orange (d. 1620)
- September 28 – Henri de La Tour d'Auvergne, vicomte de Turenne, duc de Bouillon, Marshal of France (d. 1623)
- October 6 – Ferenc Nádasdy, Hungarian noble (d. 1604)
- October 12 – Peregrine Bertie, 13th Baron Willoughby de Eresby, English baron (d. 1601)
- November 8 – Nyaungyan Min, king of Burma (d. 1605)
- December 4 – Heinrich Meibom, German historian and poet (d. 1625)
- December 27 – Johann Arndt, German Lutheran theologian (d. 1621)
- date unknown
  - Lancelot Andrewes, English clergyman and scholar (d. 1626)
  - Adam Sędziwój Czarnkowski, Polish nobleman (d. 1628)
  - Samuel Eidels, Polish Jewish rabbi and Talmudist (d. 1631)
  - Joshua Falk, Polish Jewish rabbi and commentator (d. 1614)
  - Elijah Loans, German Jewish rabbi and kabbalist (d. 1636)
  - François de Malherbe, French poet (d. 1628)
  - Okudaira Sadamasa, Japanese nobleman (d. 1615)
  - Konishi Yukinaga, Japanese Christian daimyō (d. 1600)
  - Moderata Fonte, Italian poet, writer and philosopher (d. 1592)
  - Maria van Schooten, Dutch war heroine (d. 1573)
  - Naresuan, King of Ayutthaya (d. 1605)

== Deaths ==
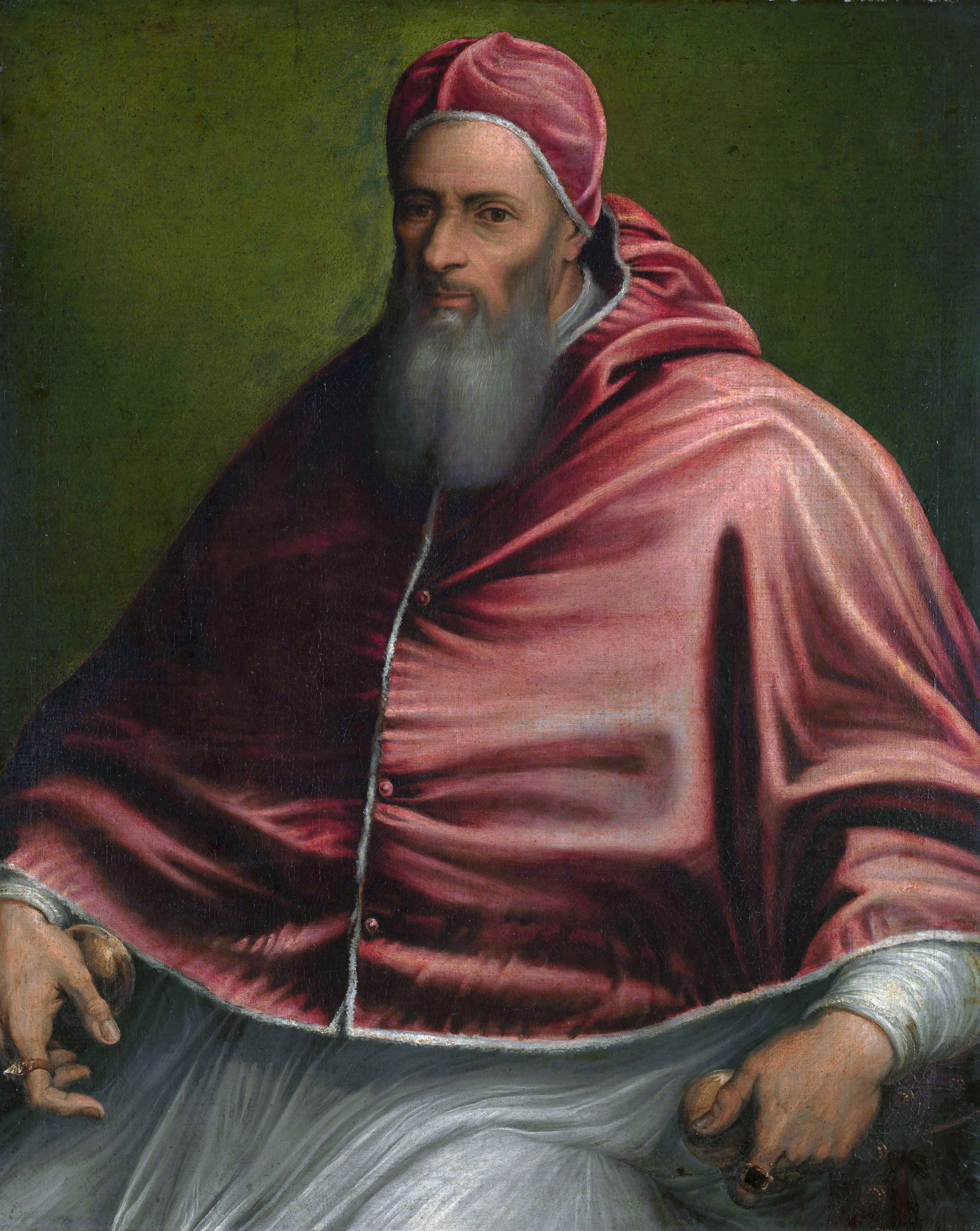
Pope Julius III

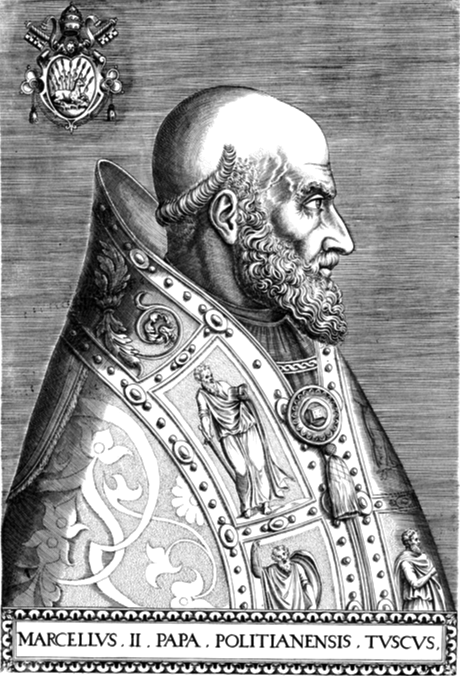
Pope Marcellus II

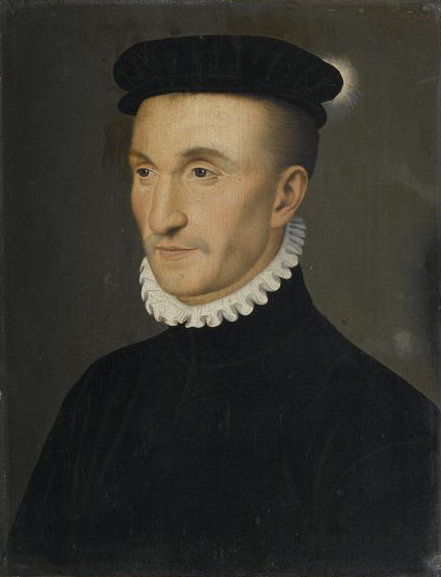
King Henry II of Navarre

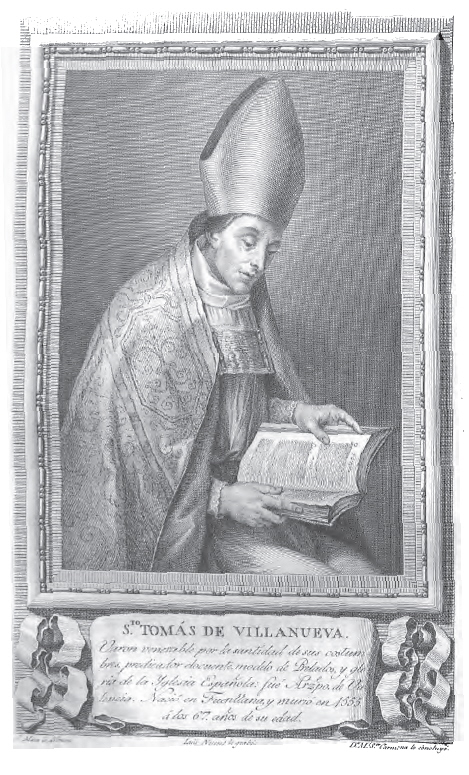
Saint Thomas of Villanova

- January 14 – Jacques Dubois, French anatomist (b. 1478)
- February 4 – John Rogers, English clergyman (burned at the stake) (b. c. 1505)
- February 8 – Laurence Saunders, English clergyman (burned at the stake) (b. 1519)
- February 9
  - Christian Egenolff, German printer (b. 1502)
  - John Hooper, English churchman (burned at the stake) (b. c. 1497)
  - Rowland Taylor, English Protestant martyr (burned at the stake) (b. 1510)
- February 17 – Giuliano Bugiardini, Italian painter (b. 1475)
- March 14 – John Russell, 1st Earl of Bedford (b. 1485)
- March 23 – Pope Julius III (b. 1487)
- March 27 – Al-Mutawakkil Yahya Sharaf ad-Din, Imam of the Zaidi state in Yemen (b. 1473)
- April 12 – Queen Joanna of Castile, long under confinement (b. 1479)
- April 18 – Polydore Vergil, English historian (b. 1470)
- May 1 – Pope Marcellus II (b. 1501)
- May 21 – George III, Landgrave of Leuchtenberg (b. 1502)
- May 25
  - Gemma Frisius, Dutch mathematician and cartographer (b. 1508)
  - Henry II of Navarre (b. 1503)
- June 10 – Elizabeth of Denmark, Electress of Brandenburg (1502–1535) (b. 1485)
- September 8 – Thomas of Villanova, Spanish Roman Catholic bishop and saint (b. 1488)
- October 5 – Edward Wotton, English zoologist (b. 1492)
- October 9 – Justus Jonas, German Protestant reformer (b. 1493)
- October 16
  - Hugh Latimer, English clergyman (burned at the stake) (b. c. 1487)
  - Nicholas Ridley, English clergyman (burned at the stake)
  - Sue Harukata, Japanese retainer under the Ouchi clan (b. 1521)
- October 26 – Olympia Fulvia Morata, Italian classical scholar (b. 1526)
- November 4 – Agnes of Hesse, German nobleman, by marriage, Princess of Saxony (b. 1527)
- November 12
  - Stephen Gardiner, English bishop and Lord Chancellor (b. 1493)
  - Yang Jisheng, Ming Chinese statesman (beheaded) (b. 1516)
  - Zhang Jing, Ming Chinese general (beheaded)
- November 21 – Georgius Agricola, German scientist (b. 1490)
- December 9 – Elisabeth of Culemborg, German noble (b. 1475)
