= Battle of Rio de Janeiro (1558) =

1558 battle

- Part of France Antarctique
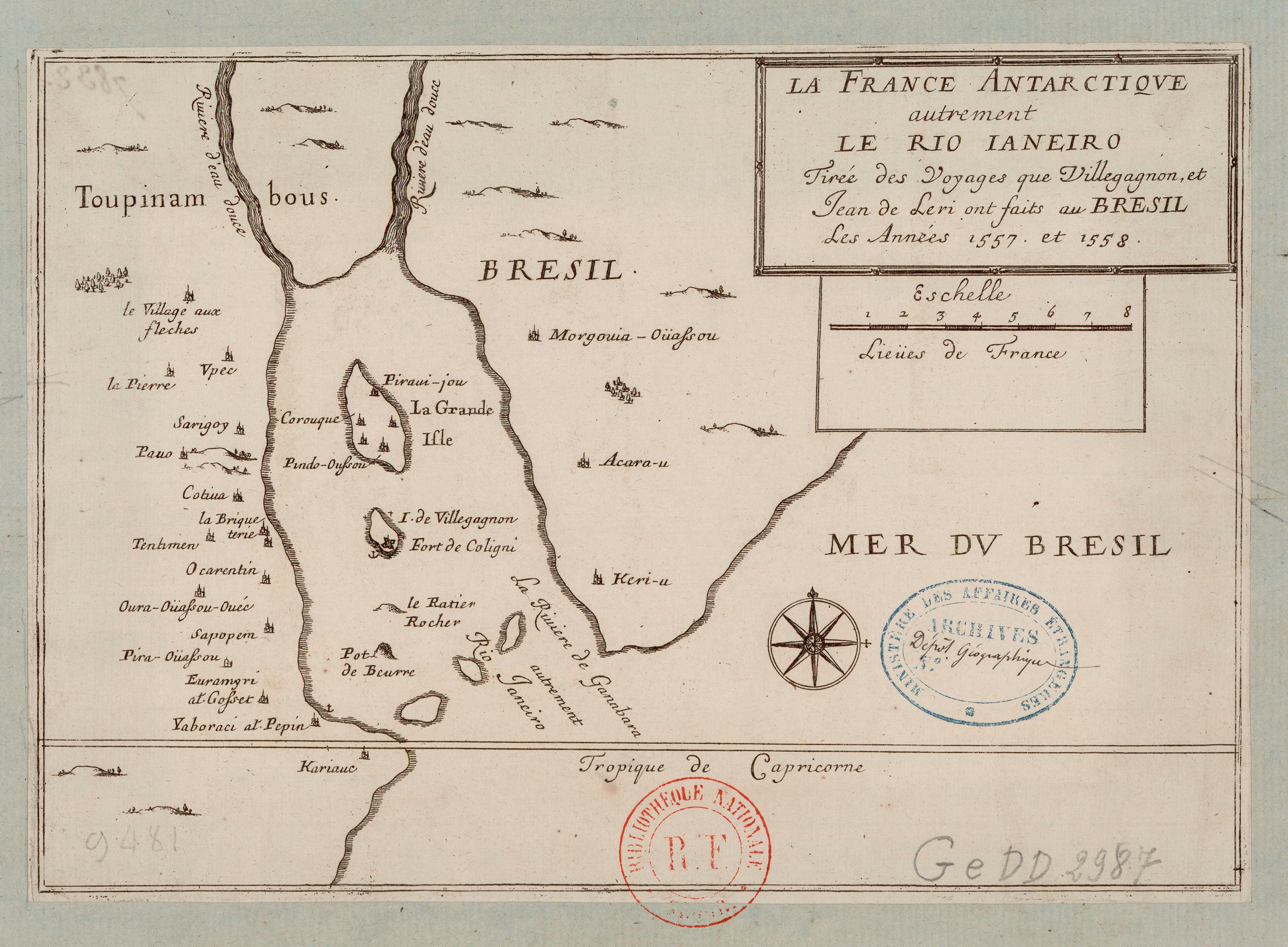
- 1550s accounts–based 1660s map of France Antarctique in the Guanabara Bay, 1555
| Date | 1558 |
| Location | Rio de Janeiro, Brazil |
| Result | Portuguese victory |
| Territorial changes | Henriville destroyed |

Belligerents
| Portugal | France; Tamoyo allies |

Commanders and leaders
| Mem de Sá | Bois-le-Comte |

Strength
| 260 men | 1,150 men |

Casualties and losses
| Unknown | Unknown |

The Battle of Rio de Janeiro took place in 1558 on the French town at Rio de Janeiro, called Henriville. The Portuguese, though in far smaller numbers, defeated the French and made them flee to the jungle. The French town was then burnt by Mem de Sá, the Portuguese governor.

== Background ==
A few years before, the French admiral and colonist Villegagnon and his friend and comrade, Admiral Coligny, managed to build a fort in the area of modern-day Rio de Janeiro which they called Fort Coligny. As the French colony grew in size and power it was named Henriville and became a serious threat to the Portuguese establishment in Brazil.
