= Jean de Cointac =

French Dominican friar

Jean de Cointac, also Contat or Cointa, was a former French Dominican friar who was one of the voyagers attempting the French colonization of Brazil called France Antarctique. His theological theories brought him into conflict in the French fort of Coligny (in present-day Rio de Janeiro), resulting in two Huguenots being expelled. Later on, Jean de Cointac himself was expelled from the fort.

== France Antarctique ==
Jean de Cointac was a student at the Sorbonne and a Dominican friar who converted to Calvinism. Cointac was aboard the second set of ships to reach France Antarctique, after Nicolas Durand de Villegaignon and his crew made the first successful voyage in November, 1555. At the time, many Huguenots were seeking a safe haven from religious persecution in France. King Henry II, although Catholic, financially supported these voyages to the New World in an effort to avoid religious conflict at home and to expand his kingdom, though the Treaty of Tordesillas technically did not permit this colonization. The second embarkation headed to France Antarctique was prepared under the name of King Henry II, under Bois-Lecompte, a nephew of Villegagnon, with 290 voyagers sailing on three ships. After sailing for four months, they landed at Fort Coligny on 9 March 1557.

Jean de Cointac was among a group of new arrivals who participated in theological debates in the new land, which eventually filled the fort with wranglings, factions, and feuds. Villegagnon took part with the student, and together devised a new religious doctrine that denounced both Catholicism and Calvinism. Supposedly inspired by the opinions of Cointac, Villegagnon declared that his opinion of Calvin had changed, and that he now held the so-called reformer to be an arch-heretic and an apostate.

By 1558, the Portuguese overtook the Fort Coligny, destroying France Antarctique.

== See also ==
- Villegagnon Island
