= Guanabara Bay oil spill =

The Guanabara Bay oil spill may be one of three oil spills in Guanabara Bay:

- 1975 Guanabara Bay oil spill
- 1997 Guanabara Bay oil spill
- 2000 Guanabara Bay oil spill
