= Pedra de Itapuca =

Rock formation in Niterói

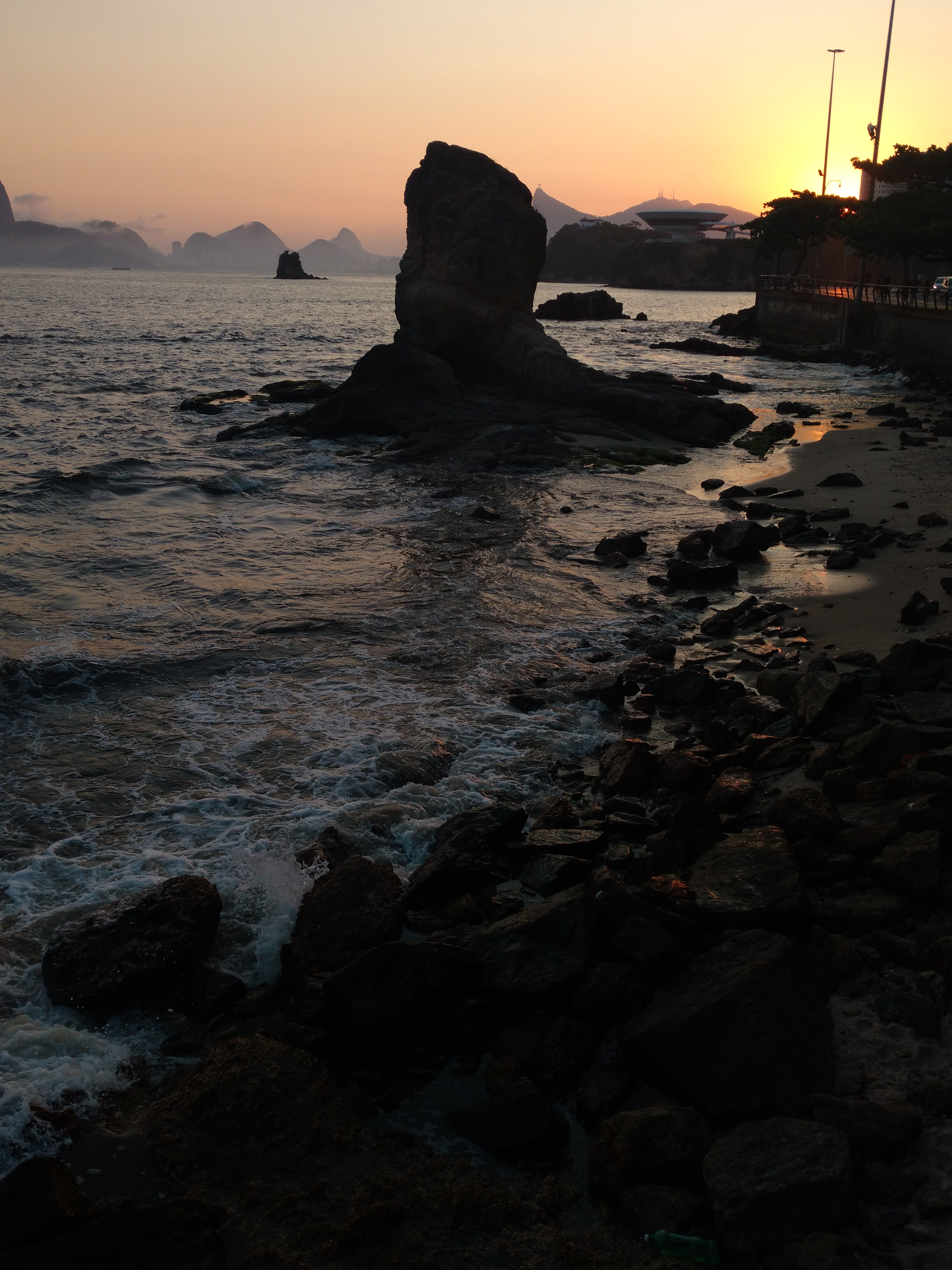
- Interactive map of Pedra de Itapuca

Geography
- Location: Ingá, Niterói
- Coordinates: 22°54′20.784″S 43°7′11.407″W

Administration
- Brazil

Pedra de Itapuca is a rock formation that is located between Praia de Icaraí, in the neighborhood of Icaraí and Praia das Flechas, in the neighborhood of Ingá, in the municipality of Niterói, in the state of Rio de Janeiro, Brazil. It is one of the symbols of the city of Niterói. The waters around it are a traditional surfing spot in the city.

== Etymology ==
"Itapuca" is a term of Tupi origin, meaning "cleft stone", through the junction of the terms itá (stone) and puca (cleft). The name is a reference to the old shape of Pedra de Itapuca, before it was imploded, in 1840, for the street of the region.

The stone formed a natural arc with the mainland, hence its Tupi name meaning "split stone". With the implosion, the arch was undone, leaving it, currently, only a rocky pillar in the sea, a few meters from the mainland.

== See also ==
- Guanabara Bay
- Niterói
