= Fort Coligny =

Former fortress in Rio de Janeiro, Brazil

Coordinates: 22°54′50″S 43°09′35″W

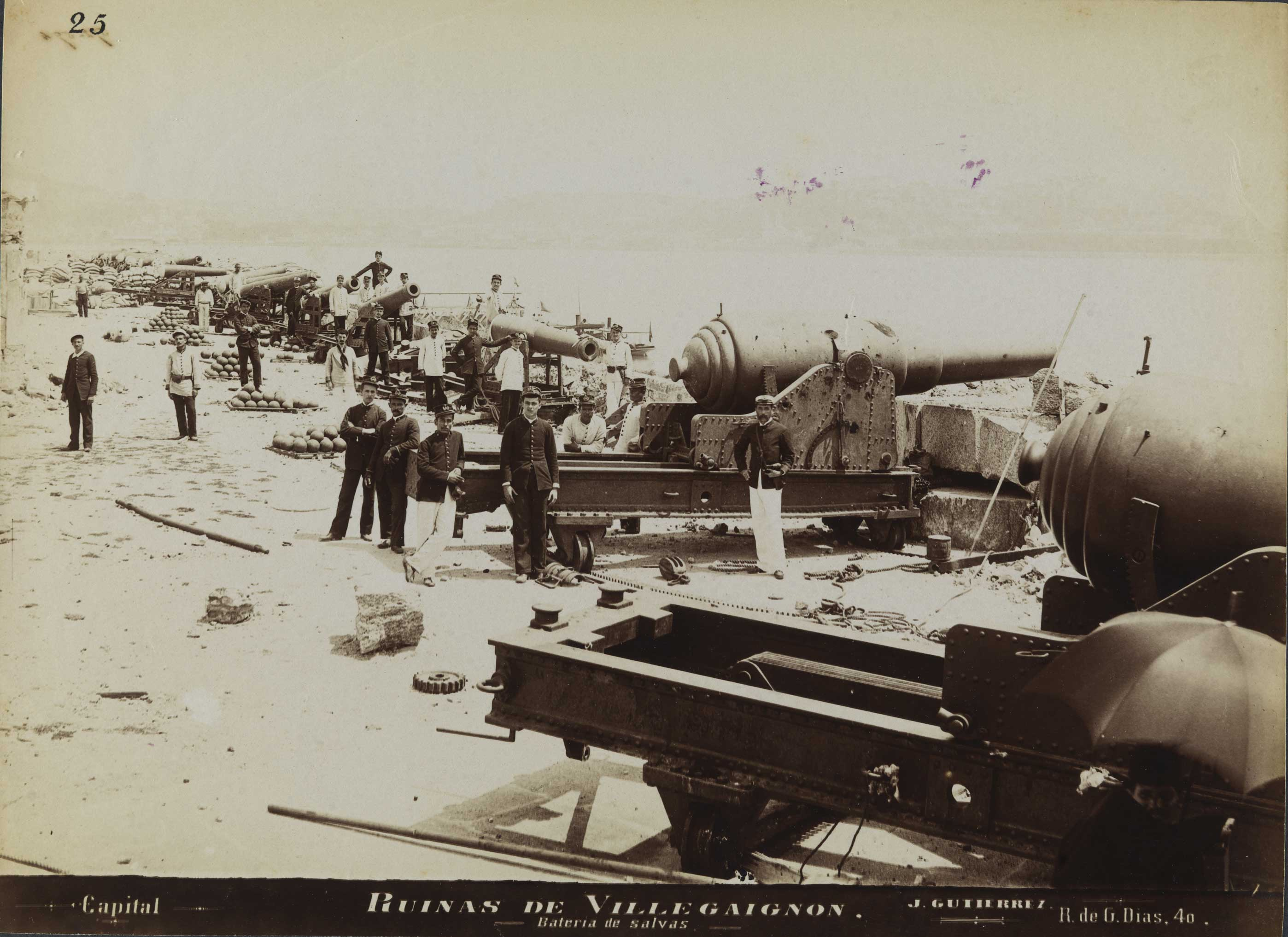
Naval guns in the old Fortress of Villegaignon, in 1898

Fort Coligny was a fortress founded by Nicolas Durand de Villegaignon in Guanabara Bay, Brazil in 1555, in what constituted the so-called France Antarctique historical episode.

For protection against attacks by hostile Indians and the Portuguese, Villegaignon built the fortress with the help of the 500 colonists who travelled with him in two ships armed by the king of France, on a small island called Serigipe by the Indians of the region, near the mouth of the large Guanabara Bay. The island was rocky and almost barren, but served Villegaignon's purpose of being near the shore, at the same time achieving a good defensive position against attacks from sea and land.

The fortress fell and was destroyed on March 17, 1560, under the siege of Portugal's navy and troops under the command of Mem de Sá, third governor-general of Brazil. Villegaignon had already returned to France, in 1558.

The fortress was named as such in honor of Villegaignon's supporter and friend, the French admiral and leader of the Huguenots, Gaspard de Coligny. After the foundation of Rio de Janeiro in 1565 by Estácio de Sá and the expulsion of the French in 1567 a new fortress was built there by the Portuguese, in order to defend the mouth of the Guanabara Bay, by crossing fire with two other fortresses, Guajará and Santa Cruz. This fortress was almost totally destroyed by bombardment in a revolt of the Navy, in 1893. Today, the island, which was renamed Island of Villegaignon, is home to the Brazilian Naval School since 1938, and is now permanently connected to the mainland, near the Santos Dumont Airport.

== See also ==
- History of France
- French colonization of the Americas
- List of French possessions and colonies
