= Ilha da Conceição =

Coordinates: 22.87175°S 43.11550°W

Ilha da Conceição (Portuguese for Conception Island) is an island, and one of the 48 administrative districts in which the city of Niterói, Rio de Janeiro in Brazil is divided. It lies in the northern zone of the city, in the Guanabara Bay.
