= Mem de Sá =

Governor-General of the Portuguese colony of Brazil

Governor General of Brazil
- In office 3 January 1558 – 2 March 1572
- Monarch: Sebastian
- Preceded by: Duarte da Costa
- Succeeded by: Lourenço da Veiga

Governor-general of Rio de Janeiro
- In office 1567–1569
- Monarch: Sebastian
- Preceded by: Estácio de Sá
- Succeeded by: Salvador Correia de Sá

Personal details
- Born: c. 1500 Coimbra, Kingdom of Portugal
- Died: 2 March 1572 (aged 71–72) Salvador, Brazil, Portuguese Empire
- Relatives: Francisco de Sá de Miranda (brother)

Military service
- Allegiance: Portuguese Empire
- Battles/wars: Battle of Rio de Janeiro (1558)

Mem de Sá (c. 1500 – 2 March 1572) was a Governor-General of the Portuguese colony of Brazil from 1557 to 1572. He was born in Coimbra, Kingdom of Portugal, around 1500, the year of discovery of Brazil by a naval fleet commanded by Pedro Álvares Cabral.

In the early sixteenth century, Brazil was not a major settled area of the Portuguese empire. The Jesuits had established aldeias in order to evangelize the Brazilian Indians. Portuguese settlers actively enslaved the indigenous populations. Mem de Sá was nominated the third Governor-General of Brazil in 1556, succeeding Duarte da Costa, who was Governor-General from 1553 to 1557. The seat of the government at the time was Salvador, in the present-day state of Bahia.

He was fortunate in securing the support of two important Jesuit priests, Fathers Manuel da Nóbrega (1517-1570) and José de Anchieta (1533-1597), who founded São Paulo, on 25 January 1554, which is today one of the largest metropolises in the world. The Jesuits were stern and persistent missionaries of the Catholic faith with the indigenous people, and their pacification of these warrior societies was one of the most important conquests of Mem de Sá's government. The Jesuits had conflicts with Duarte da Costa, because he supported the plantation owners, who tried to force slavery upon the Indians. Mem de Sá opposed the usury of the Portuguese plantation owners in their trade in Indian slaves and helped the Jesuits expand the number of their aldeias.

Mem de Sá also had an important military and political mission when, in 1560, leading a naval expedition of 26 ships and 2,000 soldiers and sailors, he was sent by the Portuguese crown to attack France Antarctique, a colony founded by Nicolas Durand de Villegaignon, a Catholic French vice-admiral on the site of present-day Rio de Janeiro. Fort Coligny, built by the French colonists on a small island of the Guanabara Bay was destroyed, but Mem de Sá was able to expel definitely the French invaders in 1567 only, with the help of his nephew, Estácio de Sá, who was also the founder of Rio de Janeiro on 1 March 1565. With the help of the Jesuits, Mem de Sá was able to convince the Tamoyo Confederation to withdraw their support to the Frenchmen.

Mem de Sá died on 2 March 1572, in Salvador.

== See also ==
- History of Brazil
- Portuguese colonization of the Americas
- De gestis Mendi de Saa
- José de Anchieta#Works
