= Naval School (Brazil) =

Brazilian military academy

- Escola Naval
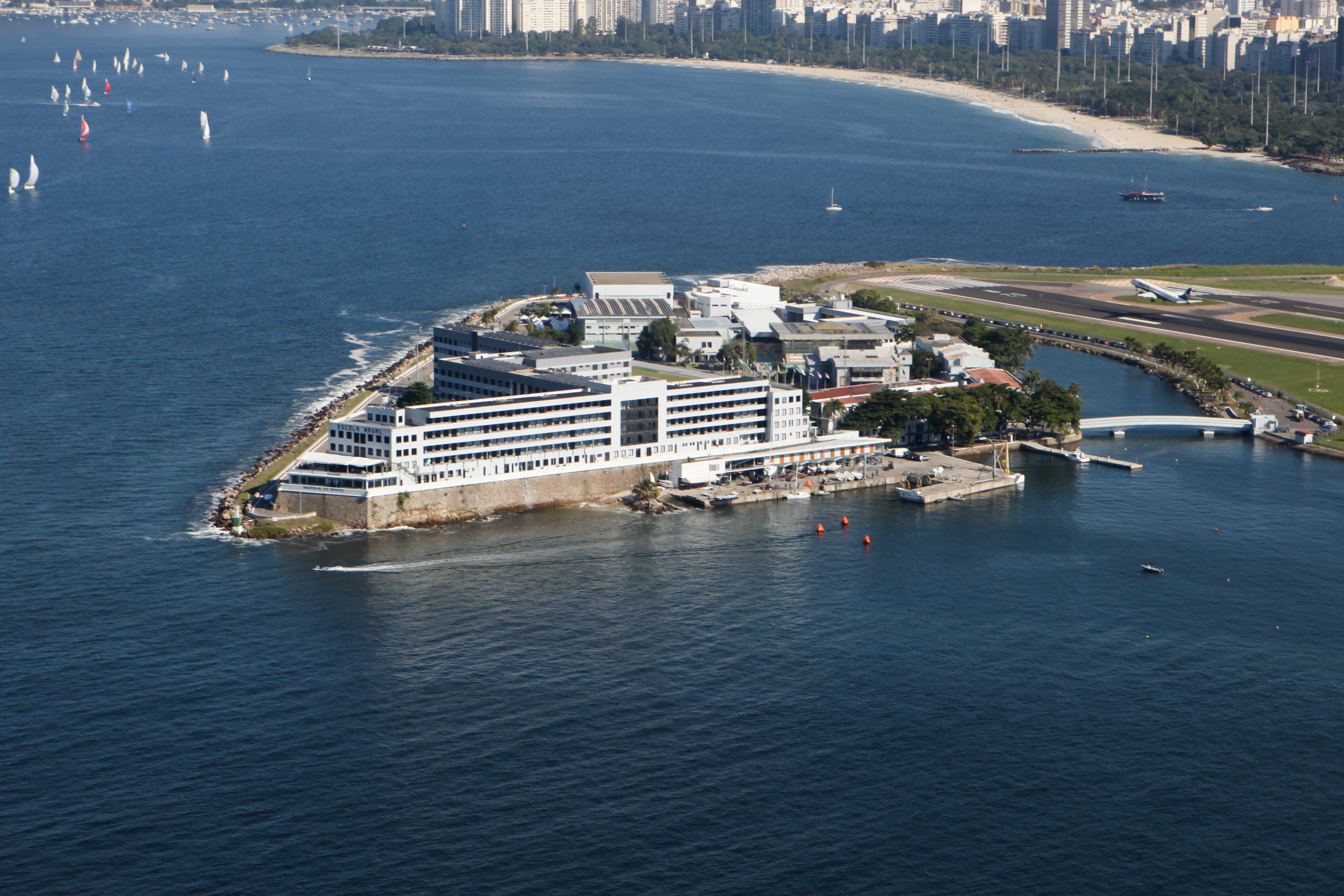
- Aerial view of the school, 2015
- Type: Naval academy
- Established: 1792 (Portuguese Naval Academy); 1808 (installation of the Portuguese Naval Academy in Brazil); 1823 (separation between the Brazilian and Portuguese naval academies)
- Location: Rio de Janeiro, on the Villegagnon Island just inside the Guanabara Bay., Brazil; 22.914°S 43.160°W
- Website: www.marinha.mil.br/en

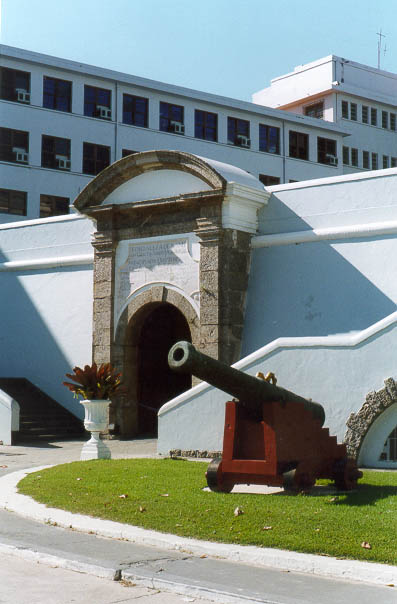
Naval Academy: Entrance (Gate of the old Villegaignon Fortress).

The Naval School (Portuguese: Escola Naval, EN) is a higher education military academy which aims to train officers for the Brazilian Navy. It is located in Rio de Janeiro, on Villegagnon Island, just inside of Guanabara Bay.

== History ==
The Brazilian Naval School has its direct origins in the Portuguese Royal Naval Academy created in Lisbon, Portugal in the 18th century.

In 1782, the Company of Midshipmen (Companhia dos Guardas-Marinhas) was created to frame and train the midshipmen (naval officer candidates) of the Portuguese Navy. The Company of Midshipmen was installed in the building of the Naval Arsenal of Lisbon.

The Royal Academy of the Midshipmen (Academia Real dos Guardas-Marinhas) was created in 1792, as a university-level naval academy. This Academy integrated the already existing Company of Midshipmen as its student corps.

In 1807, the Army of Napoleon invaded Portugal. In order not to be captured by the Napoleonic forces and maintain the independence of the Kingdom, the Portuguese Royal Court and government are transferred to the Portuguese colony of Brazil, continuing to rule from there. The Royal Academy of the Midshipmen and its Company of Midshipmen also embark in the naval fleet that carries the Royal Court to Brazil and are installed in Rio de Janeiro, in 1808.

In 1823, one year following the independence of Brazil, the faculty and the students of the Academy of the Midshipmen had to choose either the Brazilian or the Portuguese nationality. Those that chose the Portuguese nationality returned to Portugal and the others remained in Brazil. Then, two academies come into existence: the Imperial Academy of Midshipmen (Academia Imperial dos Guardas-Marinhas) in the Empire of Brazil and the Royal Academy of Midshipmen in the Kingdom of Portugal (that would become the present Portuguese Naval School).

The Brazilian Imperial Academy of Midshipmen become the School of Navy (Escola de Marinha), in 1858. In 1887, it became the Naval School (Escola Naval).

== Regatta ==
To celebrate its foundation, every year the Navy promotes the traditional Naval Academy Regatta, the largest sailing race in Latin America.

== Academics ==
Naval

- 1-Mechanics
- 2-Weapons Systems
- 3-Electronics

Marine Corps

- 1-Mechanics
- 2-Weapons Systems
- 3-Electronics

Others

- 1- Administration.

== Gallery ==
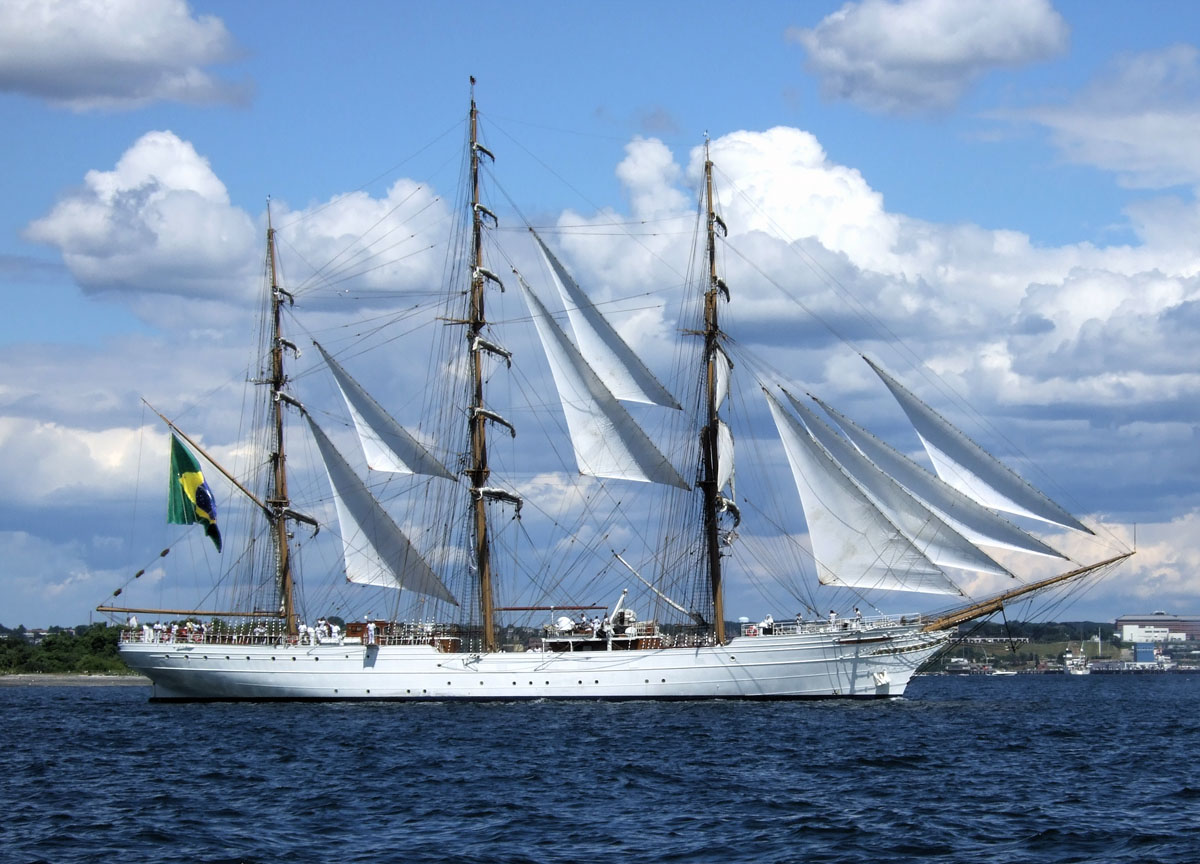
Cisne Branco

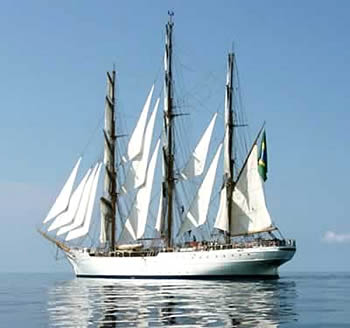
Cisne Branco

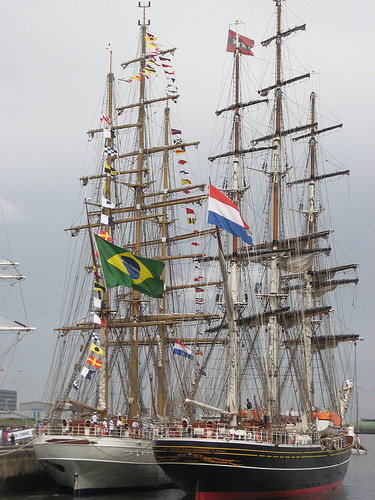
Cisne Branco and its twin ship "Stad Amisterdam"

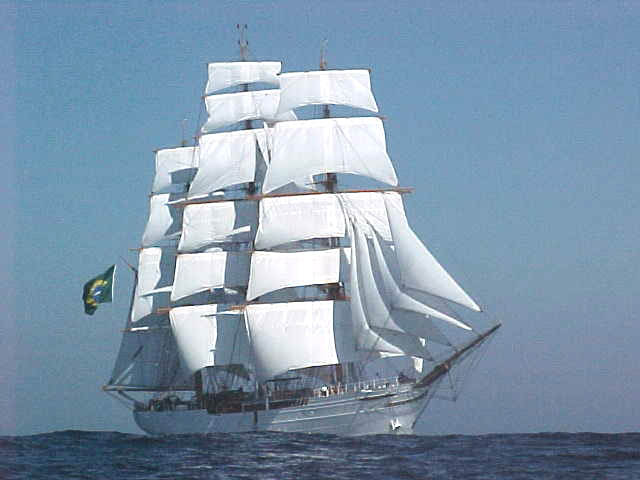
Cisne Branco on open sea

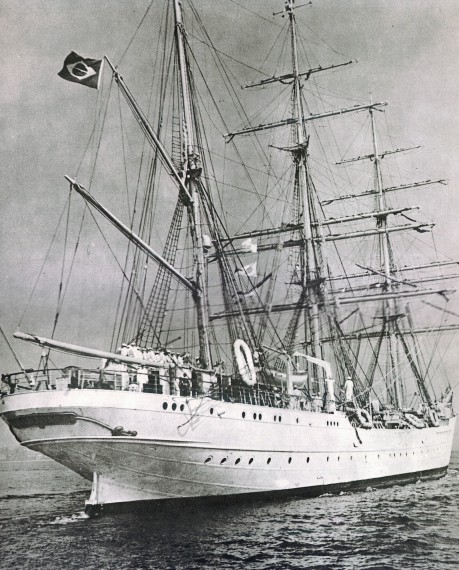
Training ship "Guanabara" in 1948.

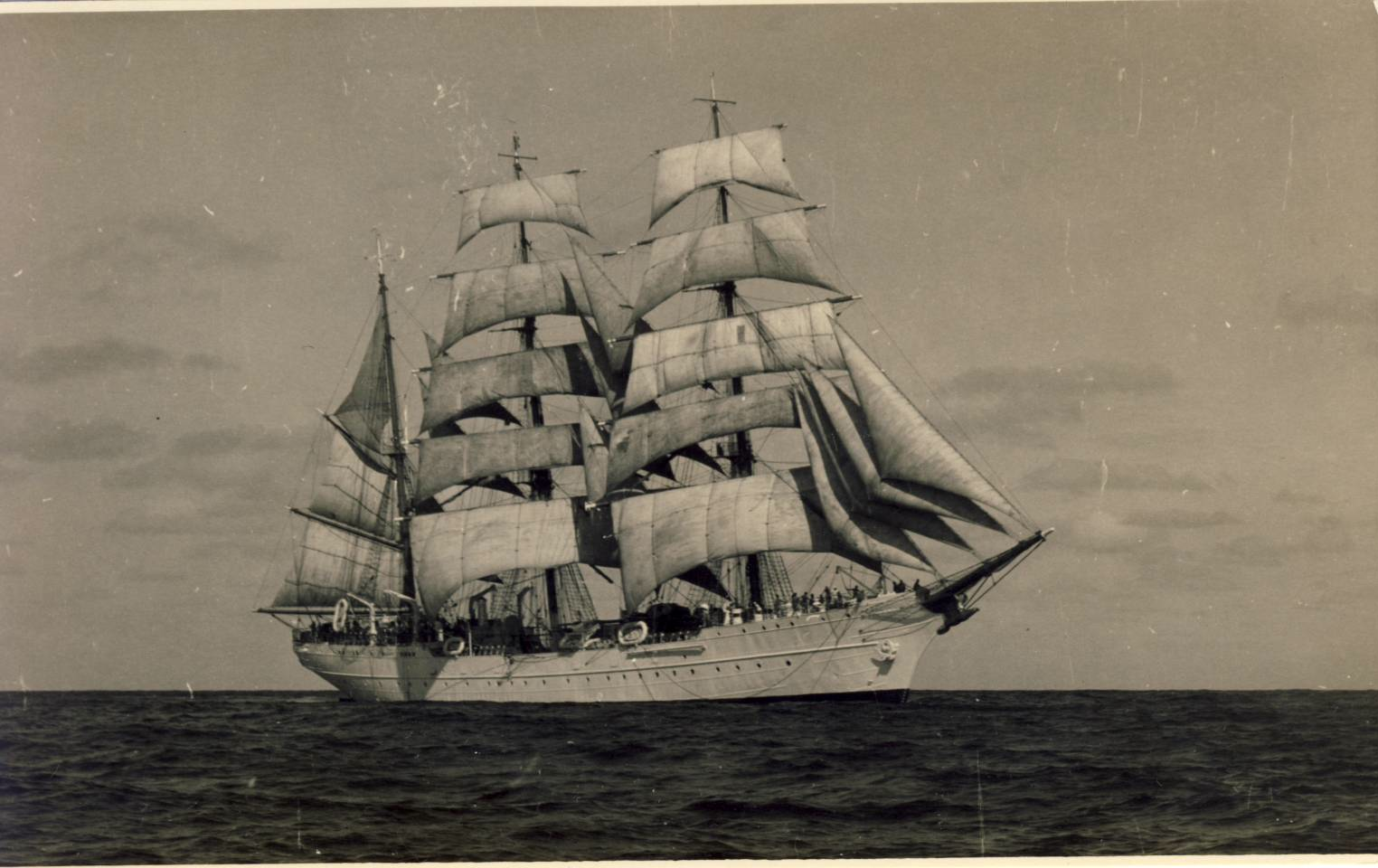
Training ship "Guanabara" in 1948.

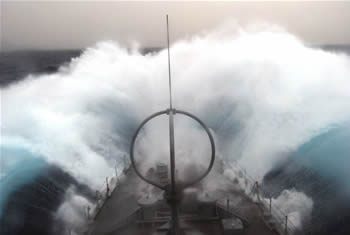
Brazilian Training ship (NE Brasil (U-27))in the Strait of Magellan

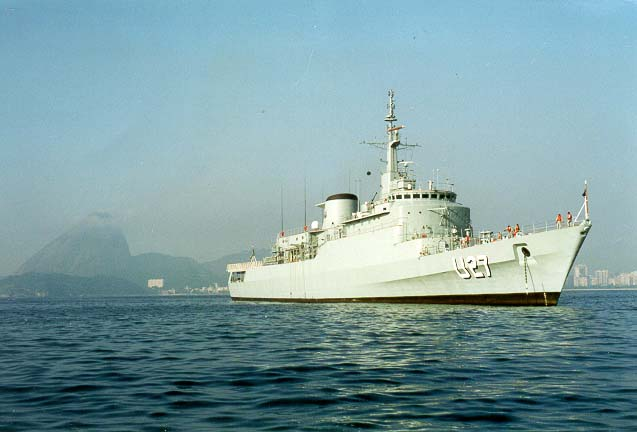
Brazilian Training ship (NE Brasil (U-27))in Rio de Janeiro
