= 1997 Guanabara Bay oil spill =

Environmental disaster in Brazil

The 1997 Guanabara Bay oil spill was one of three major oil spills in Guanabara Bay in Brazil. It leaked from the oil refinery at Duque de Caxias (REDUC) operated by Petrobras.

Petrobras estimated that a leaking pipeline released 600,000 liters (160,000 US gal) of oil into the bay, but according to Sindipetro - the petroleum industry's union - it was 2,000,000 liters (530,000 US gal) of oil that had been spilled. The incident also had a large damaging effect on marine life in the ocean; as well as, other existing areas surrounding the bay area. Many fish suffered tragic deaths as they were washed up on the shore dead or covered in oil. In addition, the fishing industry suffered a great downfall and local fishermen were unable to work or fish in the bay.

== Effects ==
Following the oil spill there were many negative after effects on the Brazilian fishermen, on the marine life and the environment. The fishing industry suffered tremendously as survival for the marine animals grew more difficult. Marine animals such as, the fish and crabs were unable to get oxygen and as a result were not able to survive. In addition, the aquatic plant life had also begun to die off and become non existent due to the oil resting on the surface of the water. This resulted in a loss of food for the marine animals as they had no aquatic plants to feed upon.^{[2]} The fishermen - who relied heavily on fishing in the bay for their own survival - were faced with tragic times, as it became more difficult to catch fish. This resulted in a downfall in the demand for fishermen and lead to a loss of employment for such individuals.

== Cleanup costs ==
The cost of the clean-up exceeded just monetary value as it also affected the individuals that relied on the welfare of the bay. The Petrobras refinery took all responsibility and vowed to execute a cleanup process. In addition to the Guanabara Bay, the contaminated areas included the beaches, and the surrounding areas leading to the beaches such as, the pathways and tunnels. The company experienced great losses in the cleaning up process as they had to compensate for damages and were fined heavily by the Brazilian government. ^{[1]}

== Economic impact ==
The oil spill had a dangerous impact on the Brazilian society and the overall Brazilian economy. There was a drastic decrease in the number of fish species living in the bay after the spill, because the bay no longer remained a habitable environment. Almost 4000 fishermen - more than half - that had previously been employed to fish at the Guanabara Bay had to resort to alternative methods of income and working odd jobs to support their families. It was unlikely that after the spill one would be able to catch more than 10 kilos of fish, where in comparison to before the spill, the average of catching fish was almost 100 kilos. ^{[3]} In addition, the quality of the fish from the bay area had also been an issue as many buyers claimed that the quality of the fish had decreased because it was now contaminated. As a result, the fish had been valued less and the prices had been reduced to about half. ^{[3]}

== See also ==
- 2000 Guanabara Bay oil spill
- Guanabara Bay topics
