= Guanabara Confession of Faith =

Calvinist creed from 1558

The Guanabara Confession of Faith was a Calvinist creed from 1558. The first Protestant writing in Brazil, and in all of the Americas, it was written by the French Huguenots Jean du Bourdel, Matthieu Verneuil, Pierre Bourdon and André la Fon, who were taken under arrest by Villegaignon. Twelve hours after writing it, the authors were hanged.
