= 2000 Guanabara Bay oil spill =

Environmental disaster in Brazil

The Guanabara Bay oil spill, one of three major spills in the bay, occurred in January 2000 in Brazil when a leaking pipeline released 1,300,000 litres (340,000 US gal) of oil into Guanabara Bay. It leaked from the oil refinery at Duque de Caxias (REDUC) operated by Petrobras. Petrobas the company at the center of the oil spill immediately moved into gear and hired a cleanup crew to assess the damages and start the process to cleaning up the affected areas. This catastrophic accident had a damaging effect on marine life in the ocean, fishes, as well as, other existing areas surrounding the bay area. Many fishes were washing up on the shore dead or covered in oil. The fishing industry took a nose dive and the fishermen's livelihood was gravely affected. As a matter of fact, the fishing industry was brought to a halt giving rise to economic downfall. There was astronomical cost to be incurred with the clean-up process and the stakeholders were in a state of growing panic. Large areas of mangrove forests were killed and had not grown back ten years later. The tucuxi (Sotalia fluviatilis) dolphin species inhabit the bay but were able to avoid the primary effects of the oil spill.

The oil spill was a catalyst for the passage of new environmental law in Brazil.

== Effects ==
There were affects to society and to the marine life and environment at large. The fishing industry suffered tremendously. The fishes and crabs could not get oxygen and as a result, they succumbed to death. The aquatic plant life e.g. (The mangrove in the bay) began to wither and die because of the oil being trapped on the surface of the water. One major concern that the fishermen had was concerning the fish that survived the oil spill. They had no aquatic plants to feed because the plant life in the ocean became non-existent as the oil settle itself on the ocean surface. The fishermen, who relied on fishing for their livelihood, could not have a catch to depend on, and soon the industry resorted to loss of employment for fishermen, trading loss among crab vendors, and loss of revenue for families who depended on fishing as their primary means of survival. Even a decade of efforts by the Petrobras refinery was not enough to restore the Bay to its original condition.

== Clean-up costs ==
The cost of the clean-up and the drastic effect the spill had on the fishing industry remained for many years to come. The Petrobras refinery who were responsible for the spill in the first place, accepted liabilities and promised to execute the cleanup process. Among the affected areas were the beaches, mangrove mashes, and the surrounding areas leading to the beach front (pathways and tunnels). There were also, dead birds and fishers along the shoreline of the front. The actual cleanup process cost Petrobras over $100,000,000. The process of recovery, environmental cleaning and compensation for damages took a significant toll on the company's expenditures, which resulted in great profit loss for Petrobras. Their years of efforts was overwhelming, but the result did little to justify the labor extended to the task.

== Economical impact of the Guanabara Bay Oil Spill on Brazilian society ==
The spill impacted the Brazilian society and the overall economy on a hold. The massive death and extinction of many species of fish prompted a significant decrease in the number of fish that supported the bay. A total of about 4000 of the total 6000 fishermen in the Guanabara Bay had resorted to alternative sources of income and jobs, because of the decline in the fishing industry. According to some fishermen in the region one can hardly obtain ten kilos of catch, a scenario which was contrary to the previous period before the spillage when the fishermen could obtain a catch of 100 kilos or more. The quality of the fish from the bay area had also been a source of concern. Research findings have shown that the fish surrounding the bay area was contaminated; therefore the prices in the region were valued at half the price because of quality. In addition, the Petrobas refinery company also lost a substantial amount of money through fines from the Brazilian Government, as well as, compensation and other strict environmental conservation concerns. To combat this growing onslaught Petrobas developed some environmental conservation strategies by putting strict methods and policies in place to offset its critics. However, these measures proved to be extremely costly, putting a dent in the company's fiscal stability.

== Stakeholders affected from disaster ==
Greenpeace (an environmental bureau set up by the government) challenged Petrobras on its demand to observe dramatic changes on corporate policies. They questioned their ability to execute the environmental conservation mandate and were very vocal in their disapproval of their handling of the situation. To gain some ground Petrobras argued that the spill was caused, not by dumping of oil, but by a broken pipeline, a mere accident that did not result in customers' being revengeful or unaccommodating. The other affected stakeholders were the government of Brazil, the local authorities, the fishermen in the region, the local business people and the Petrobras refinery company. The fishermen were affected by the decrease in the number of fishes that influenced their daily catch, as well as the fish quality. There was a high level of contamination in the fishes that occupied the bay area. The local authorities were also affected by the spillage, since it led to the halt of the activities at the coast that would attribute to government revenue collection. The government was first affected by the challenge the event caused on its policies and they had to make immediate re-adjustment. New policies had to be adopted to cater for future tragedies of this nature. Petrobras Refinery Company was the hardest hit, since they had to pay fines of over 28 million dollars for the damages caused as a result of the oil spill. Compensation was also paid to affected citizens within the bay area and adjacent to it.

== Changes in government regulations ==
Changes and regulatory policies became the order of the day for the government following the oil spill. Transforming the way government performed its regulatory measures were address. One of the main changes that occurred was the enhanced precision by which the governing and the oil industries handle the environmental requirements for incidents such as this oil spill. The government changed their regulations and demanded Risk Management and an Emergency Plan to be put in place. Every oil institution must execute “oil Pollution Risk Assessment”. This law demanded an inclusive policy manual on the avoidance of oil pollution accident. The “Emergency plan” had to take effect during an oil spill and must have the official endorsement of the environmental bureau (Greenpeace). In order to drive home the seriousness of the situation the Government established a task force (in addition to Greenpeace) to regulate and enforce the plans that were laid out by the environmental bureau. This was done in the form of an auditing team. This team must be independent and not be affiliated with any of the immediate parties (government or oil company). Oil industries were given strict guidelines to observe these regulations, by creating higher standards within their institution. This was a very challenging experience for the oil companies, who had suffered enormous financial loss during this period. Complying with the regulation was a must, but the effect it had on the oil companies was tremendous.

== Company changes as a result ==
Immediate work was done to ensure that Government policies were adhered to: - Immediate replacement of storage tanks as well as, underground piping facilities was done to avoid any more disaster. A compulsory replacement plan was put in place to ensure that compliance was followed and adhered too. - Transportation method was another important aspect of change that had to be address. The policy demanded a merit based approval of the transportation vessels to minimize or eliminate spillage. - There had to be strict approval policies that required stable channels and vessels for the transportation of oil within the environment.

== See also ==
- 1997 Guanabara Bay oil spill
