= Estácio de Sá =

Portuguese soldier and officer (1520–1567)

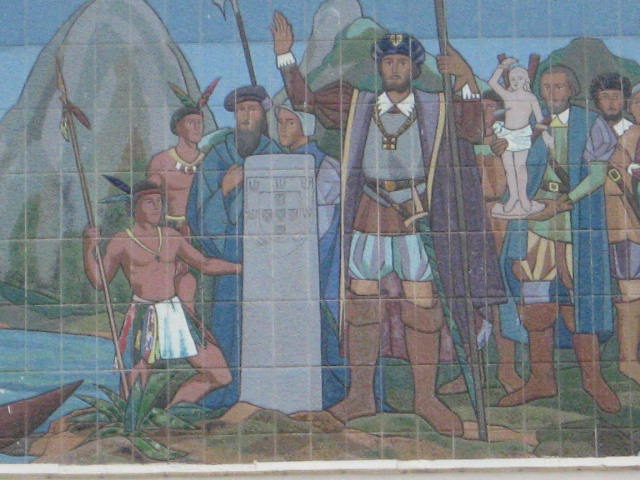
- The founding of the city of Rio de Janeiro by Estácio de Sá

Governor of Rio de Janeiro
- In office 1565–1567
- Monarch: Sebastian I of Portugal
- Preceded by: Office created
- Succeeded by: Mem de Sá

Personal details
- Born: 1520 Santarém, Kingdom of Portugal
- Died: 20 February 1567 (aged 46–47) Rio de Janeiro, Colony of Brazil

Military service
- Allegiance: Portuguese Empire
- Battles/wars: Battle of Rio de Janeiro

Estácio de Sá (1520 – 20 February 1567) was a Portuguese soldier and officer. Sá travelled to the colony of Brazil on the orders of the Portuguese crown to wage war on the French colonists commanded by Nicolas Durand de Villegaignon. These French colonists had established themselves in 1555 at Guanabara Bay in Rio de Janeiro, in a settlement known as France Antarctique. He was the founder of Rio de Janeiro, now the second largest city in Brazil.

== Biography ==
Born in Santarém, Portugal in 1520, Estácio de Sá was the nephew of the Governor General of the colony of Brazil, Mem de Sá.

He arrived with two galleons at Salvador, Bahia, in 1564. In 1565, after extensive preparations and the help of Jesuits, such as Manuel da Nóbrega and José de Anchieta, he departed by sea from São Vicente, São Paulo, the first Portuguese settlement in Brazil, with an attack force. On March 1, he founded the city of São Sebastião do Rio de Janeiro near the Sugarloaf Mountain and established the basis of his military operations against the French and their Indigenous allies.

After receiving reinforcements sent by sea by his uncle from Salvador, Sá commanded a definitive and successful attack on the fortification of Uruçú-mirim on 20 January 1567. He died on 20 February 1567 of wounds inflicted by an arrow which had perforated his eye.

Sá was interred in the church of Saint Sebastian in the encampment he had founded. As the city of Rio de Janeiro grew, his remains were relocated to a new church of Saint Sebastian in the Castelo. His remains were rediscovered in 1839 by several scholars working for Emperor Pedro II, and, in 1862, when the church was being rebuilt, some of his bones were exhumed in the presence of the emperor and placed in a "worthy urn".

== Legacy ==
As the founder of Rio de Janeiro, Estácio de Sá is honored by the names of many locations and institutions in Brazil. A brief list follows:

- the Estácio neighborhood in the city of Rio de Janeiro;
- the Rio samba school, Grêmio Recreativo Escola de Samba Estácio de Sá, usually referred to as simply Estácio de Sá. Rio is one of the cradles of samba, the popular music of Brazil;
- the Universidade Estácio de Sá, one of the three largest private universities of Brazil;
- the Universidade Estácio de Sá Futebol Clube, a football club owned by the above university.
