= Battle of Rio de Janeiro (1567) =

Part of the Portuguese takeover of France Antarctique

- Part of France Antarctique
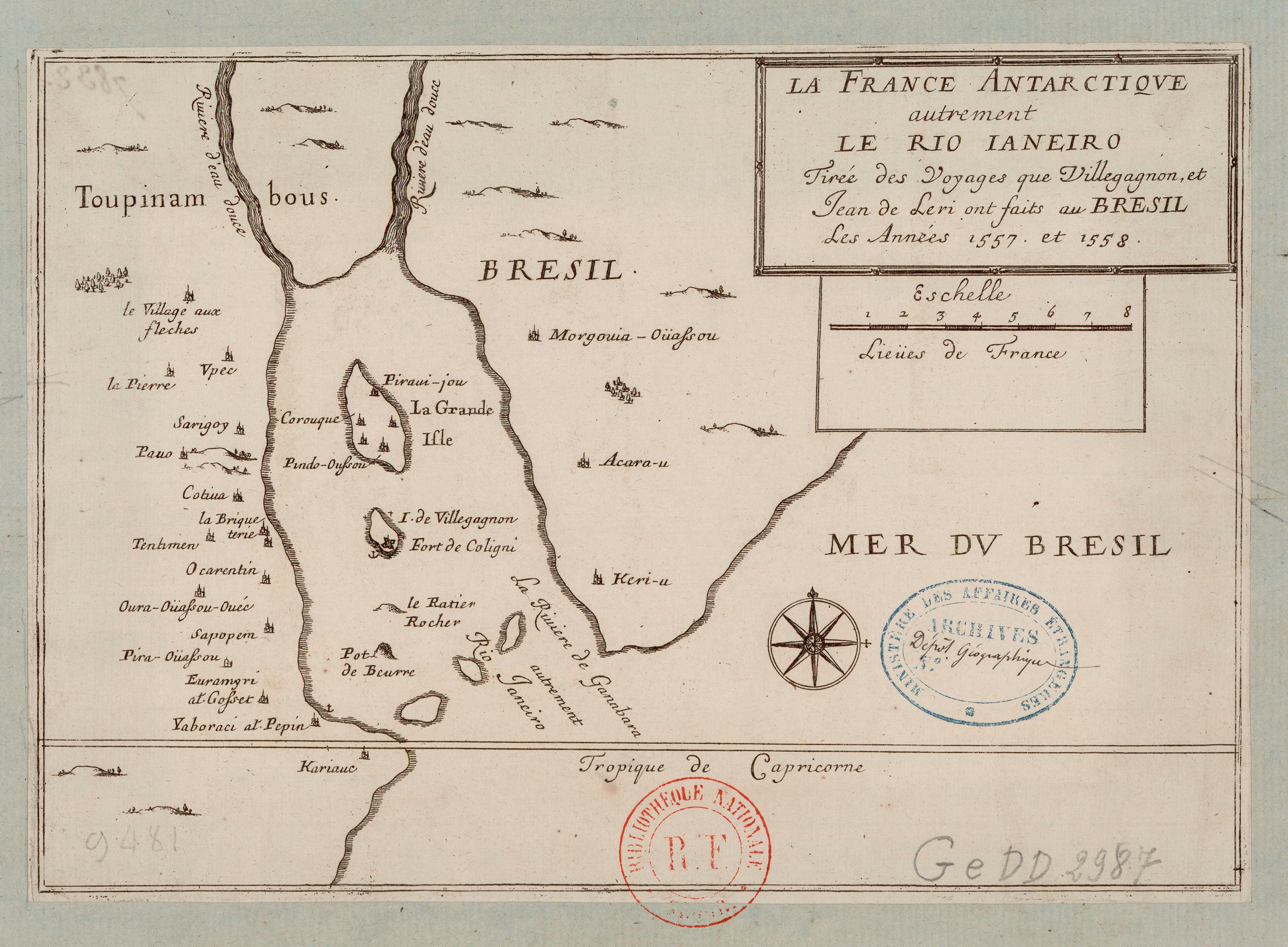
- 1550s accounts–based 1660s map of France Antarctique in the Guanabara Bay, 1555
Date	20 January 1567
Location	Rio de Janeiro, Brazil
Result	Portuguese victory

Belligerents
Portugal	France; Tamoyo allies

Commanders and leaders
Estácio de Sá (DOW)	Unknown

Strength
Unknown	Unknown

Casualties and losses
Unknown	Unknown

The Battle of Rio de Janeiro or the Battle of Guanabara Bay took place on 20 January 1567 at Rio de Janeiro that ended with the definitive defeat of the French. Specifically, the battle was an attack on the fortification of Uruçú-mirim. The Portuguese commander, Estácio de Sá, was hit by an arrow which perforated his eye, and died on 20 February.
