= Villegagnon Island =

Island in Rio de Janeiro, Brazil

Coordinates: 22°54′50″S 43°09′35″W

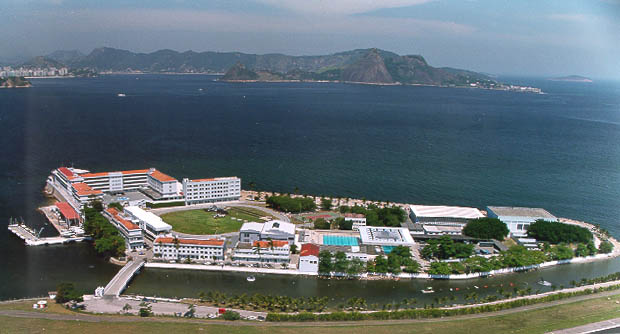
Villegagnon Island today, where the Brazilian Naval School is built.

Villegagnon Island (former Serigipe Island—original Portuguese: Ilha de Villegagnon—also known in English as: Villegaignon Island, Island of Villegagnon or Island of Villegaignon) is located near the mouth of the large Guanabara Bay, in the city of Rio de Janeiro, Brazil.

== History ==
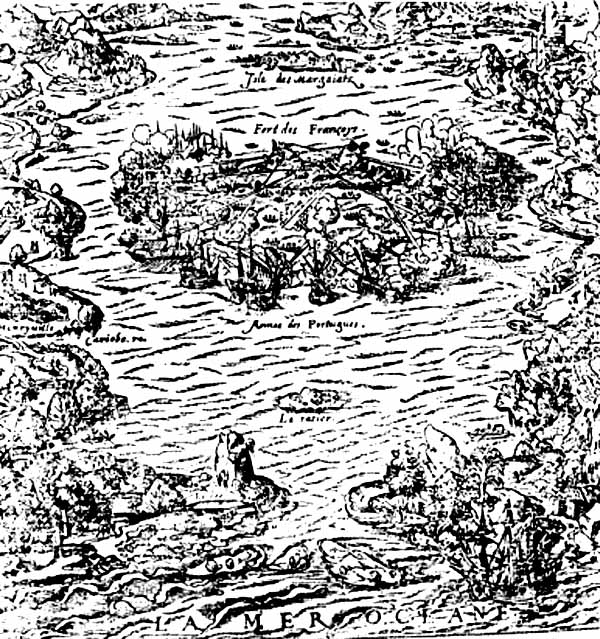
Attack of Villegagnon island by the Portuguese on 15 March 1560.

The island's name was given in honor of its first European occupier, the French admiral Nicolas Durand de Villegaignon, whose troops occupied the island in 1555, consequently building Fort Coligny on the island when attempting to establish the France Antarctique colony.

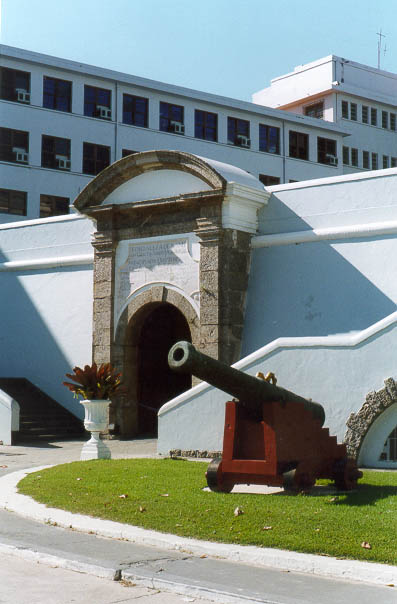
Entrance of the old São Francisco Xavier Fortress on Villegagnon Island.

With the arrival of more Portuguese troops from the São Vicente Capitania on March 15, 1560, Villegagnon Island became the stage for the attack from the Portuguese army commanded by Mem de Sá, who deployed his troops on the island. Two days later the French abandoned the fort looking for refuge with the Tamoios, a native tribe from Brazil. The fort was destroyed and on March 17, 1560 the first Portuguese mass was celebrated on the island.

Mem de Sá's victory was facilitated by the information about the fort which had been provided by Jean de Cointra and Jacques Le Balleur, French dissenters who had escaped from Villegaignon.

A new fortress was established by the Portuguese in the following century.

Since 1938, the island has been the home of the Brazilian Naval School, under the responsibility of the Brazilian Navy.
