= France Antarctique =

French colony in Brazil (1555–1567)

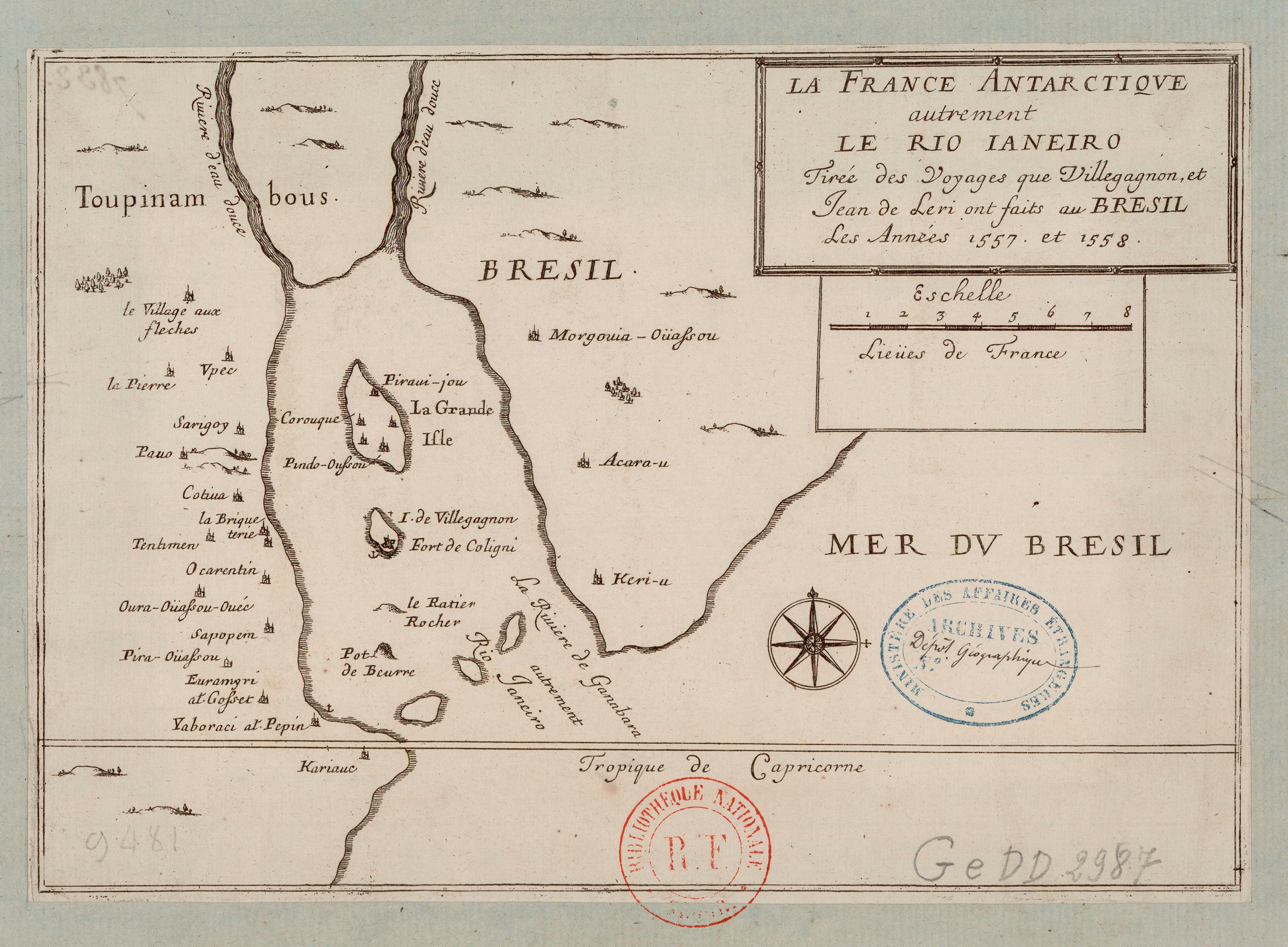
1550s accounts–based 1660s French map of Guanabara Bay

France Antarctique (also spelled France antartique) was a French colony in Rio de Janeiro, in modern-day Brazil, which existed between 1555 and 1567, and had control over the coast from Rio de Janeiro to Cabo Frio. The colony quickly became a haven for Huguenots, and was ultimately destroyed by the Portuguese in 1567.

== Colonization attempt ==
Europeans first arrived in Brazil in April 1500, when a fleet commanded by Pedro Álvares Cabral on behalf of the Portuguese crown arrived in present-day Porto Seguro, Bahia. Except for Salvador (the first Brazilian capital city) and São Vicente (the first Portuguese settlement), however, the territory still remained largely unexplored half a century later.

=== Early French involvement with Brazil ===
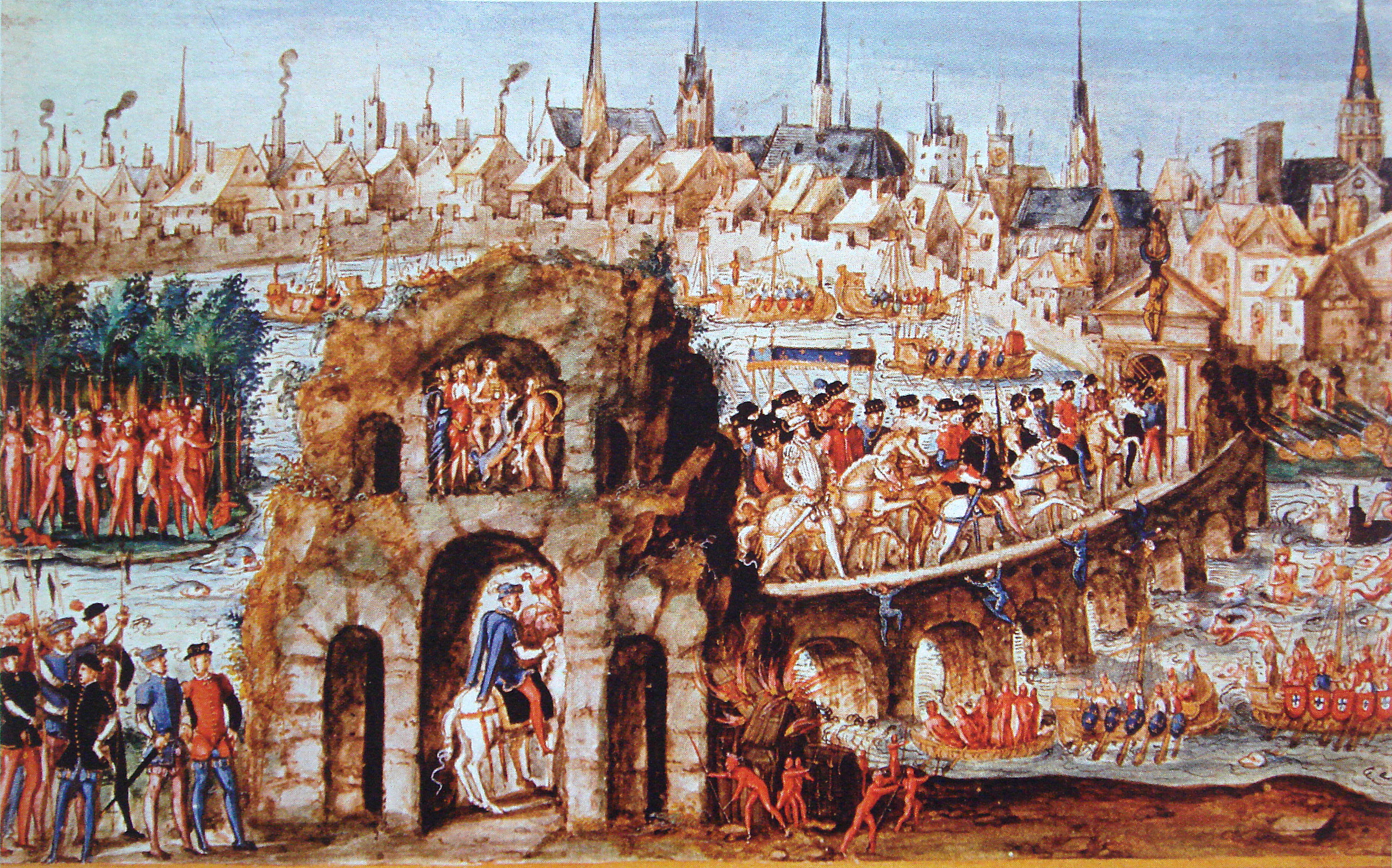
At the royal entry of Henry II in Rouen, 1 October 1550, about fifty naked men were employed to illustrate life in Brazil and a battle between the Tupinambá allies of the French, and the Tabajara Indians.

Early expeditions of French Norman sailors to the New World have been suggested: Jean Cousin has been said to have discovered the New World in 1488, four years before Christopher Columbus, when he landed in Brazil around the mouth of the Amazon, but this remains unproven. His travels were succeeded by that of Binot Paulmier de Gonneville in 1504 onboard L'Espoir, which was properly recorded and brought back a Tupi Indian named Essomericq. Gonneville affirmed that when he visited Brazil, French traders from Saint-Malo and Dieppe had already been trading there for several years.

France continued to trade with Portugal, especially loading brazilwood (Pau-Brasil), for its use as a red dye for textiles. In 1550, in the royal entry for Henry II of France, at Rouen, about fifty men depicted naked Indians and a battle between the Tupinamba allies of the French, and the Tabajara Indians.

=== Colonization ===
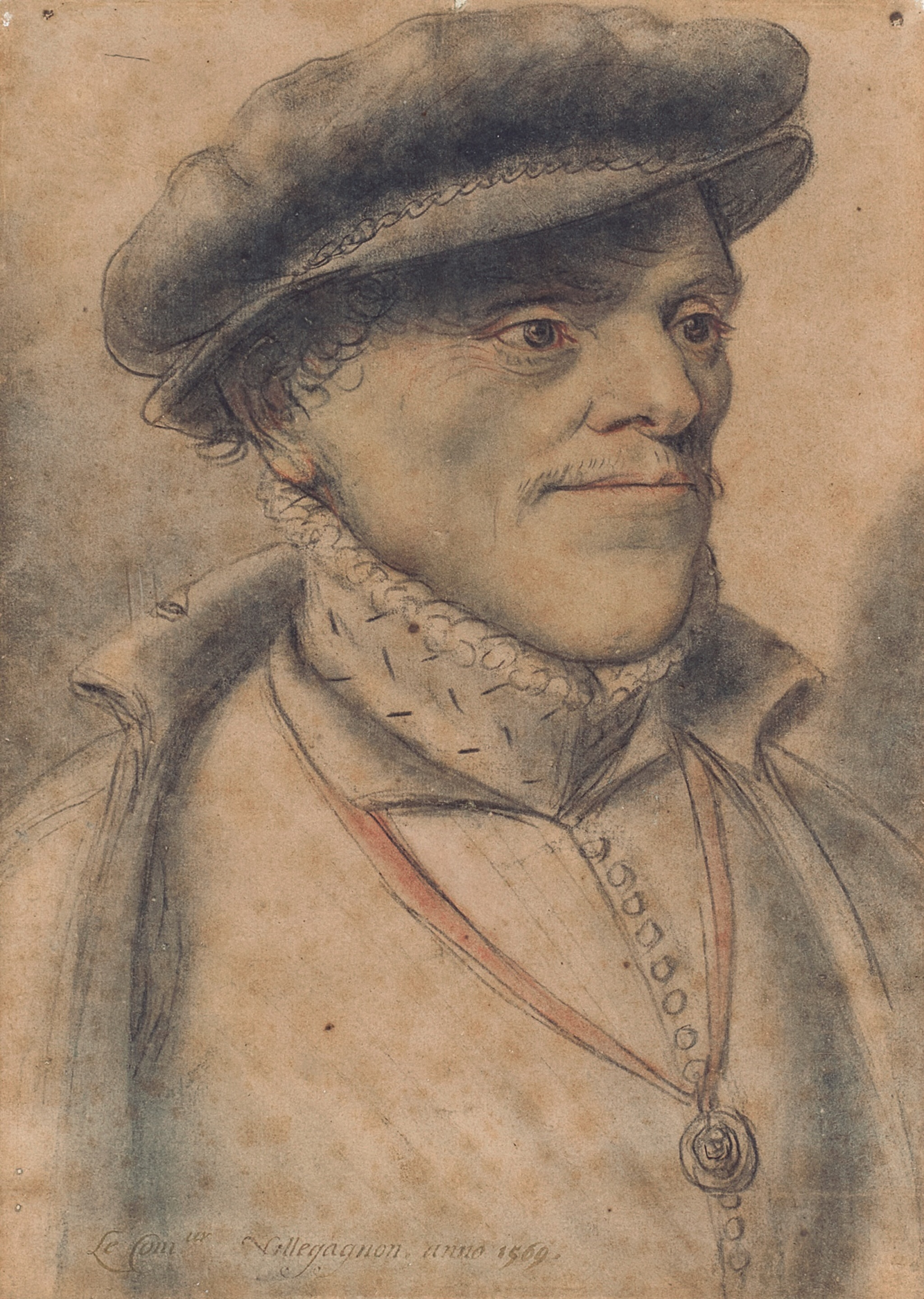
Nicolas de Villegaignon

On 1 November 1555 French vice-admiral Nicolas Durand de Villegaignon (1510–1575), a Catholic knight of the Order of Malta, who later would help the Huguenots to find a refuge against persecution, led a small fleet of two ships and 200 soldiers and colonists, and took possession of the small island of Serigipe in the Guanabara Bay, in front of present-day Rio de Janeiro, where they built a fort named Fort Coligny. The fort was named in honour of Gaspard de Coligny (then a Catholic statesman, who about a year later would become a Huguenot), an admiral who supported the expedition and would later use the colony in order to protect his Reformed co-religionists.

To the still largely undeveloped mainland village, Villegaignon gave the name of Henriville, in honour of Henry II, the King of France, who also knew of and approved the expedition, and had provided the fleet for the trip. Villegaignon secured his position by making an alliance with the Tamoio and Tupinambá Indians of the region, who were fighting the Portuguese.

=== 1557 Calvinist arrival ===
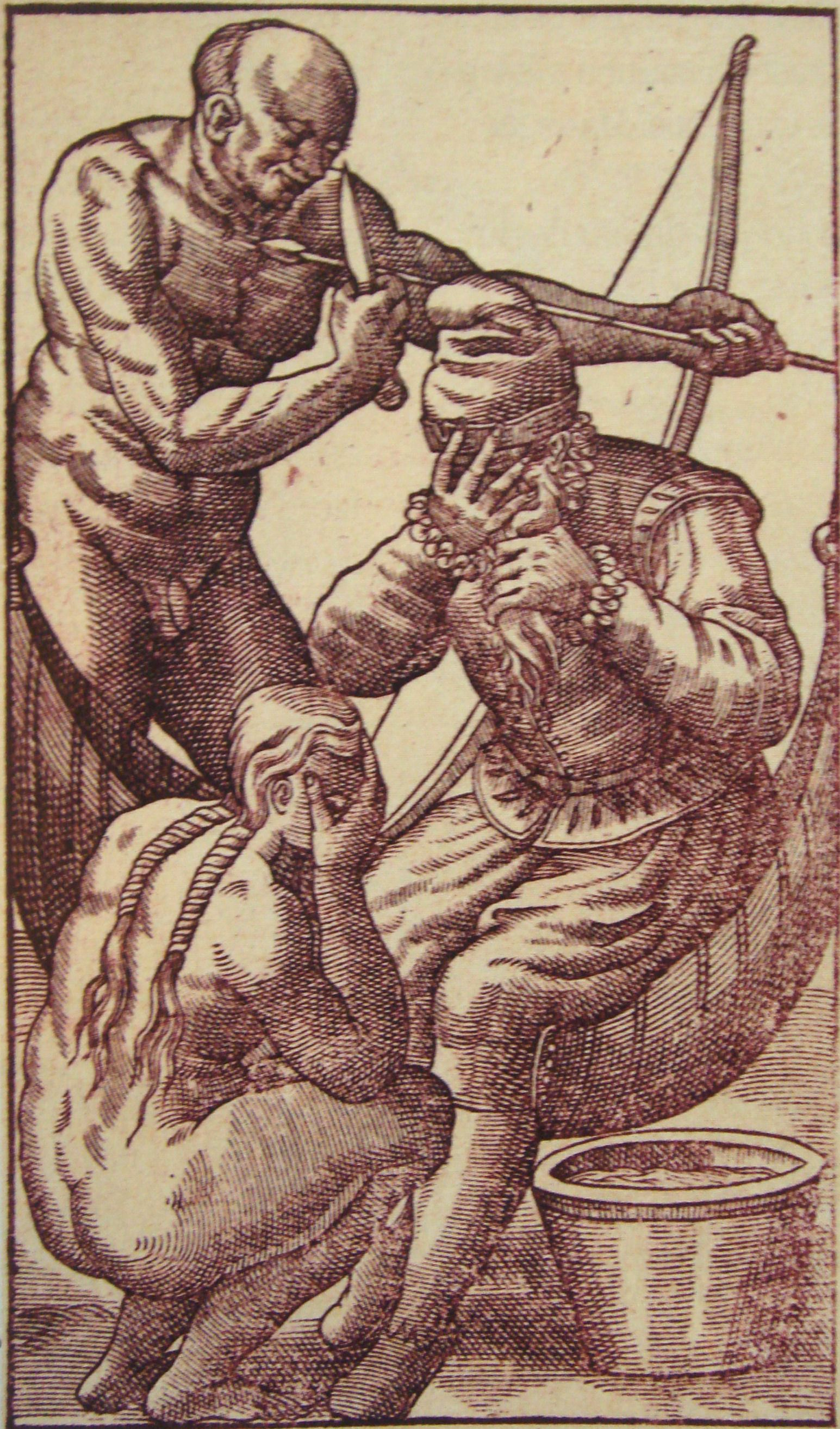
"Salutations larmoyantes" ("Tearful salutations"), in Histoire d'un voyage faict en la terre du Brésil (1578), Jean de Léry, 1580 edition

Unchallenged by the Portuguese, who initially took little notice of his landing, Villegaignon endeavoured to expand the colony by calling for more colonists in 1556. He sent one of his ships, the Grande Roberge, to Honfleur, entrusted with letters to King Henry II, Gaspard de Coligny, and according to some accounts, the Protestant leader John Calvin.

After one ship was sent to France to ask for additional support, three ships were financed and prepared by the king of France and put under the command of Sieur De Bois le Comte, a nephew of Villegaignon. They were joined by 14 Calvinists from Geneva, led by Philippe de Corguilleray, including theologians Pierre Richier and Guillaume Chartrier. The new colonists, numbering around 300, included 5 young women to be wed, 10 boys to be trained as translators, as well as 14 Calvinists sent by Calvin, and also Jean de Léry, who would later write an account of the colony. They arrived in March 1557. The relief fleet was composed of:

- The Petite Roberge, with 80 soldiers and sailors was led by Vice Admiral Sieur De Bois le Comte.
- The Grande Roberge, with about 120 on board, captained by Sieur de Sainte-Marie dit l'Espine.
- The Rosée, with about 90 people, led by Captain Rosée.

Doctrinal disputes arose between Villegaignon and the Calvinists, especially in relation to the Eucharist, and in October 1557 the Calvinists were banished from Coligny island as a result. They settled among the Tupinamba until January 1558, when some of them managed to return to France by ship together with Jean de Léry, and five others chose to return to Coligny island where three of them were drowned by Villegaignon for refusing to recant.

=== Portuguese intervention ===
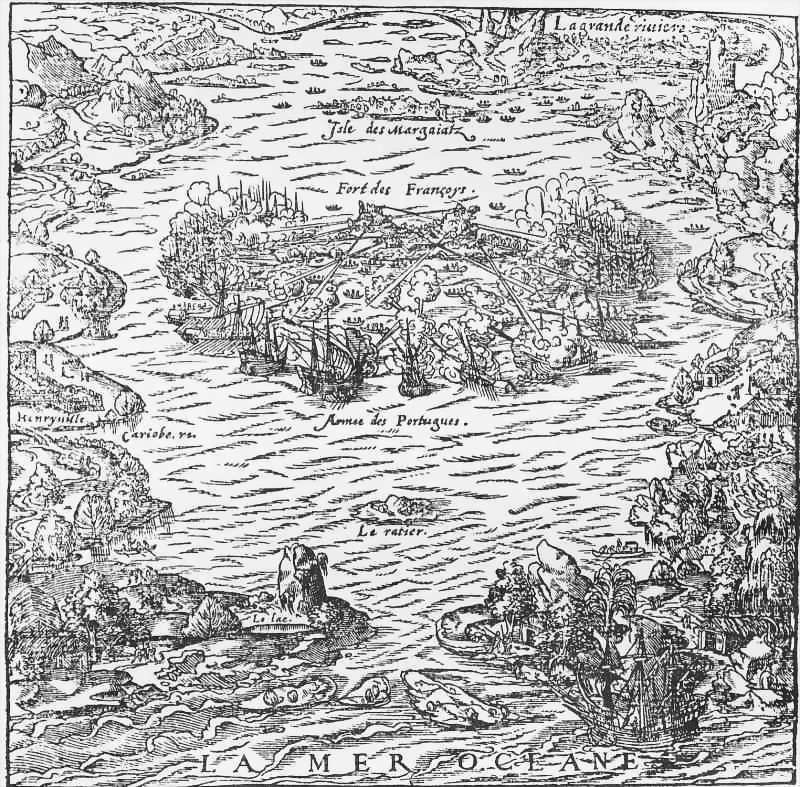
The Island of Villegaignon under Portuguese attack (1560)

In 1560 Mem de Sá, the new Governor-General of Brazil, received from the Portuguese government the command to expel the French. With a fleet of 26 warships and 2,000 soldiers, on 15 March 1560, he attacked and destroyed Fort Coligny within three days, but was unable to drive off their inhabitants and defenders, because they escaped to the mainland with the help of the Tupi Indians, where they continued to live and to work. Admiral Villegaignon had returned to France in 1558, disgusted with the religious tension that existed between French Protestants and Catholics, who had come also with the second group (see French Wars of Religion).

Urged by two influential Jesuit priests who had come to Brazil with Mem de Sá, named José de Anchieta and Manuel da Nóbrega, and who had played a big role in pacifying the Tamoios, Mem de Sá ordered his nephew, Estácio de Sá to assemble a new attack force. Estácio de Sá founded the city of Rio de Janeiro on 1 March 1565 and fought the Frenchmen for two more years. Helped by a military reinforcement sent by his uncle, on 20 January 1567 he imposed final defeat on the French forces and decisively expelled them from Brazil, but died a month later from wounds inflicted in the battle. Coligny's and Villegaignon's dream had lasted a mere 12 years.

Largely in response to the two attempts of France to conquer territory in Brazil (the other one was named France Équinoxiale and occupied present-day São Luís, State of Maranhão), between 1612 and 1615, the Portuguese crown decided to expand its colonization efforts in Brazil.

== Other French in Brazil ==
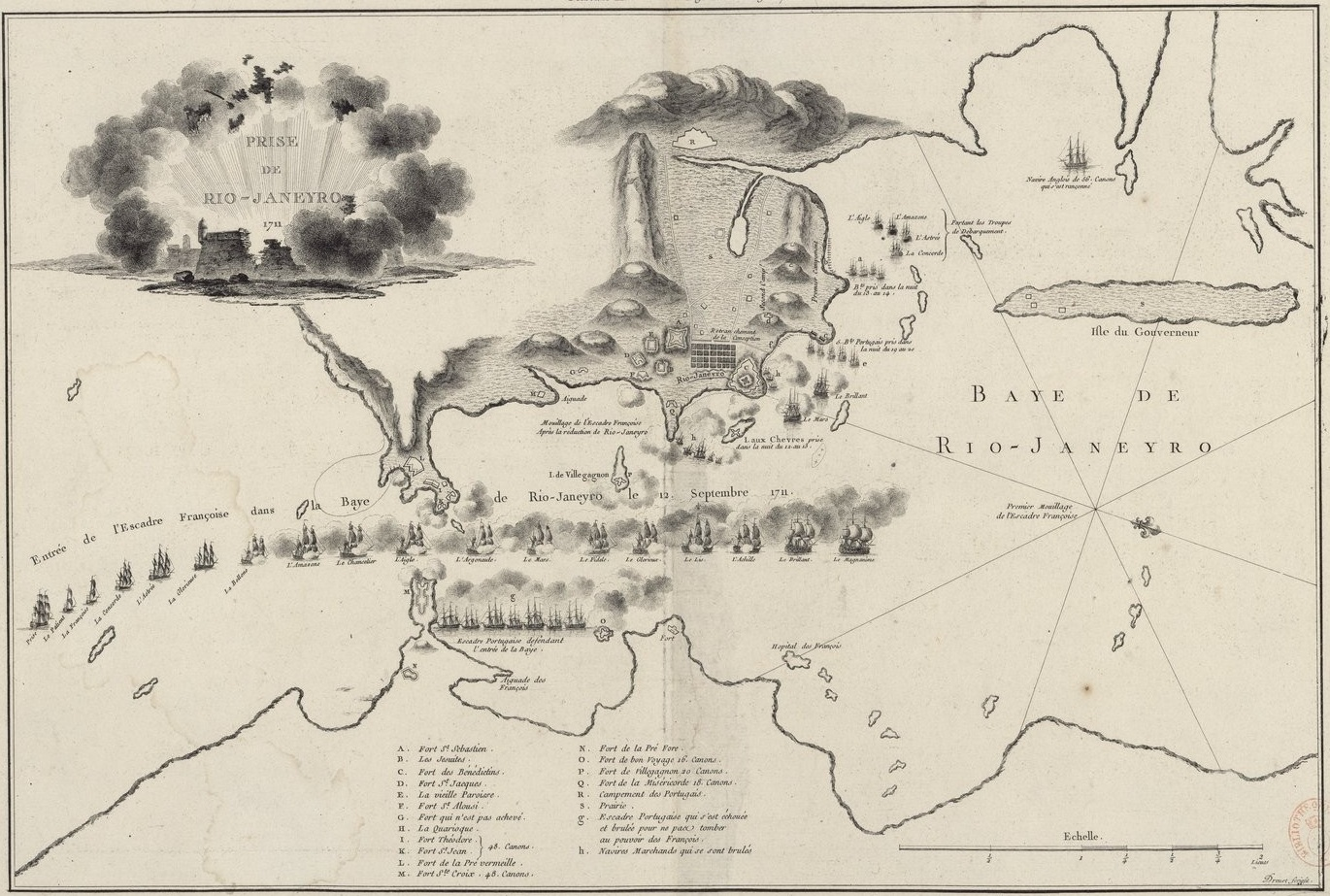
Capture of Rio de Janeiro by Duguay-Trouin in 1711

In 1502, two years after the discovery of Brazil, the Portuguese king created a monopoly company to trade in brazilwood. One year later the French appeared along the coast, trading metal goods for Brazilwood. Frenchmen were often left along the coast to learn the languages and organize the next year's load. Brazilian Indians were taken to France where they, and reports of them, inspired European ideas of the state of nature and the noble savage. Portuguese and French traders fought each other and Portuguese warships were sent to drive off the French without clear success, notably in 1516.

In 1555 the French tried to settle in what is now Rio de Janeiro (above). They were driven out in 1567.

In the 1530s the 900-man João de Barros/Aires da Cunha expedition was sent to colonize the northern coast. It was wrecked on the shore and almost everyone died. After this disaster the Portuguese neglected the north coast and the French moved in, trading along the north coast and as far south as the mouth of the São Francisco River. They allied with the local Potiguar. In 1582 a Portuguese expedition destroyed five French ships on the Paraíba do Norte River but was driven off by the Potiguar. In 1612 the French tried to settle France Équinoxiale at what is now São Luís but they were driven out two years later. After a few decades the French were gone, except for French Guiana.

== See also ==
- Colonial Brazil
- Dutch Brazil
- Equinoctial France
- French colonization of the Americas
- Jean de Cointac
- List of French possessions and colonies
- French invasions in Brazil
- Battle of the Canoes
