= Nicolas Durand de Villegagnon =

French soldier, knight, and explorer (1510–1571)

Fra Nicolas Durand de Villegagnon
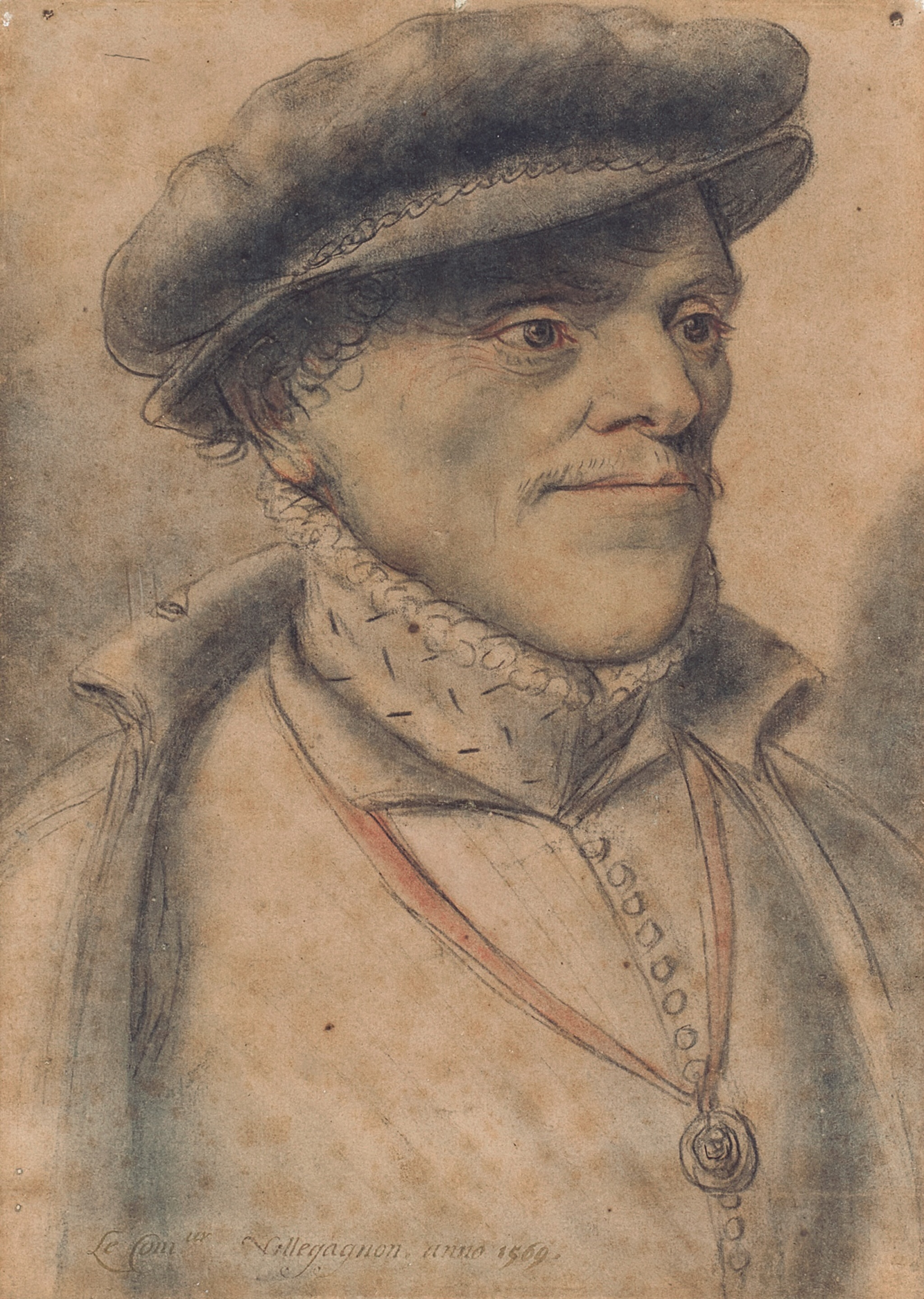
- Portrait of a Man in a Cap by Nicolas Lagneau, traditionally identified as Villegagnon and dated 1569
- Born: 1510; Provins, Champagne, France
- Died: 9 January 1571 (aged 60-61); Beauvais, Picardy, France
- Military career
- Allegiance: (Sovereign Military Order of Malta) Order of Saint John; Kingdom of France
- Service years: 1521–1571
- Conflicts: Algiers expedition (1541); Little War in Hungary; Invasion of Gozo (1551); Siege of Tripoli (1551)

Nicolas Durand, sieur de Villegagnon, also Villegaignon (1510 – 9 January 1571) was a commander of the Knights of Malta, and later a French naval officer (vice-admiral of Brittany) who attempted to help the Huguenots in France escape persecution, before turning against them due to Eucharistic disputes.

A notable public figure in his time, Villegagnon was a mixture of soldier, explorer, and adventurer. He fought pirates in the Mediterranean and participated in several campaigns against the Ottoman Empire.

== Early life ==
Villegagnon was born in Provins, France in 1510. He was educated in Paris and received a law degree at Orleans. In 1531, he joined the Knights of Malta where his uncle, Philippe Villiers de L'Isle-Adam, was grand-master.

== Ottoman campaigns in the Mediterranean and in Scotland ==
Nicolas de Villegagnon fought in numerous campaigns against the Ottoman Empire. The Franco-Ottoman alliance kept France out of direct confrontation with the Turks but Villegagnon fought on behalf of the Order of Malta, a Catholic military order which aligned with Charles V against the Ottomans.

In 1534, he served in the fleet assembled off of Majorca by Charles V in preparation for an attack on Tunis and the Ottoman fleet led by Hayreddin Barbarossa. In 1541, Villegagnon participated in the expedition against Algiers where he was wounded. After living in Rome for a while, he fought against the Ottomans from 1542 to 1546.

In 1548, he commanded a French naval expedition that took five-year-old Mary, Queen of Scots to France after she was promised to marry the Dauphin of France. This was a daring operation, covertly sailing galleys around Scotland, while the English fleet was expecting an attack from the other direction. After setting out from Dumbarton Castle with Mary, the French ships were forced by an adverse wind back into the Firth of Clyde, and anchored at the roadstead of Lamlash", before finally reaching Roscoff, France.

Back in Scotland in February 1549, he helped capture Ferniehirst Castle from the English. The commanders then discussed their next move. Villegagnon insisted they should halt and build a fortification at Roxburgh and decided the best position. The Scottish high command held a vote which was inconclusive, but finally, after the intervention of the French ambassador Henri Cleutin, Villegagnon's plan was adopted.

Commanding the Knights in Mdina, Villegagnon helped repel the Ottomans at Malta in 1551 before they went on to lead the Invasion of Gozo (1551). He was then present at the Siege of Tripoli against the Ottoman Empire, and wrote an account about it in 1553. Villegagnon illustrated himself by courageously defending Gaspard de Vallier, the vanquished Commander of Tripoli, who was being heavily criticized by the Grand Master d'Homedes who wished to assign all the blame for the defeat on him. Nicolas de Villegagnon staunchly defended him and exposed the duplicity of d'Homedes.

== France Antarctique ==
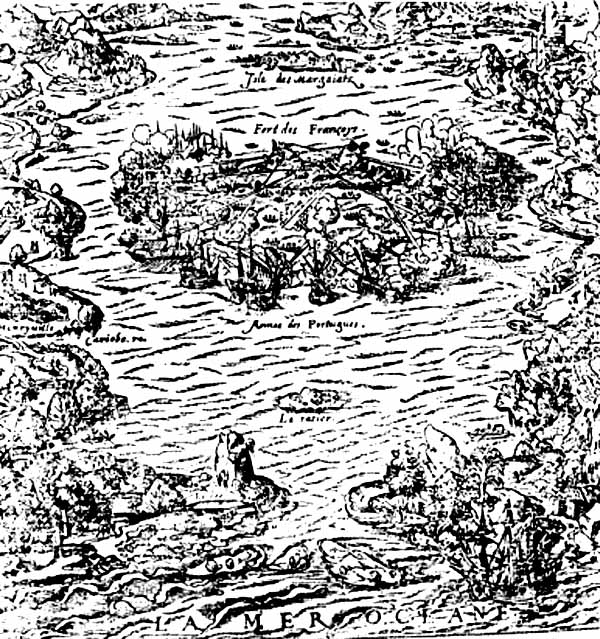
Drawing of the Island of Villegaignon, in Rio de Janeiro

Villegagnon became an important historical figure in the attempt for king Henry II to build a "France Antarctique", by invading present-day Rio de Janeiro, Brazil in 1555 with a fleet of two ships and 600 soldiers and colonists, mainly French Huguenots and Swiss Calvinists who sought to escape Catholic persecution in Europe. A disagreement over Eucharistic theology soon caused Villegagnon and the Calvinists to quarrel. Villegagnon eventually expelled those who held to Calvin's view of the Eucharist from his fortified island.

Villegagnon's initial plan was to help the Huguenots establish a colony in the New World. He wanted also to secure a permanent base in Brazil in order to exploit brazil wood, then a very valuable source of red dye and hardwood for construction (which gave the name to what was to become Brazil), and to explore for precious metals and gem stones, which the Europeans believed to exist in abundance in the land.

After a number of battles against the Portuguese, the French colonists were defeated by Estácio de Sá, a nephew of the third Portuguese Governor-General of Brazil, Mem de Sá, on 15–16 March 1558.

== Return to France ==
Villegagnon had already returned to France, in 1559, disgusted with the infighting between Catholics and Protestants in the small colony. He had left the colony under the command of his nephew Bois-le-Comte, endeavouring to obtain more funds and ships for the colony. The internal fight against the Calvinists however made colonial adventures less of a priority for the Crown. After the colony fell to the Portuguese, Villegagnon finally agreed to give up his claims to France Antarctique after receiving 30,000 écus from the Portuguese Crown.

=== Fight against the Protestants ===
In 1560, Villegagnon challenged Calvin to a theological debate on the eucharist, which the latter declined. He became actively involved against the Protestants, and participated in the repression of the Amboise conspiracy.

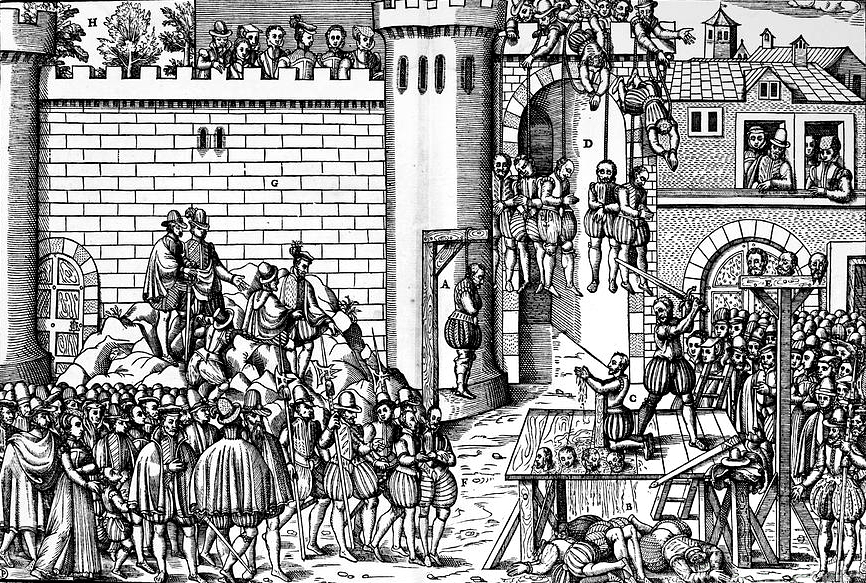
Villegagnon participated in the repression of the Amboise conspiracy in 1560.

In 1561, Pierre Richier published a pamphlet against Villegagnon's actions in Brazil, entitled "Réfutation des folles resveries, excecrable blasphèmes, erreurs et mensonges de Nicolas Durand, qui se nomme Villagagnon" [Refutation of the foolish imaginations, terrible blasphemies, errors and lies of Nicolas Durand, named Villagagnon].

New attempts were made to create a Huguenot colony in the New World, again at the instigation of Coligny, this time in French Florida from 1562 to 1565, under Jean Ribault and René de Laudonnière.

From 1568, Villegagnon became the representative of the Order of Malta at the French Court. The next year, in 1569, he published in Paris a new controversy about the eucharist, entitled "De Consecratione, mystico sacrificio et duplici Christi oblatione".

Villegagnon became Commander of the Order of Malta Commandery in Beauvais, where he died on 9 January 1571, aged about 60.

The Catholic André Thévet, who had accompanied him on the first trip to Brazil, published in 1572 a description of the Brazil adventure and an attack on the Protestants, in his "Cosmographie Universelle". The Protestant Jean Léry would respond to it in 1578 with his "Histoire d'un voyage faict en la terre du Brésil".

== Legacy ==
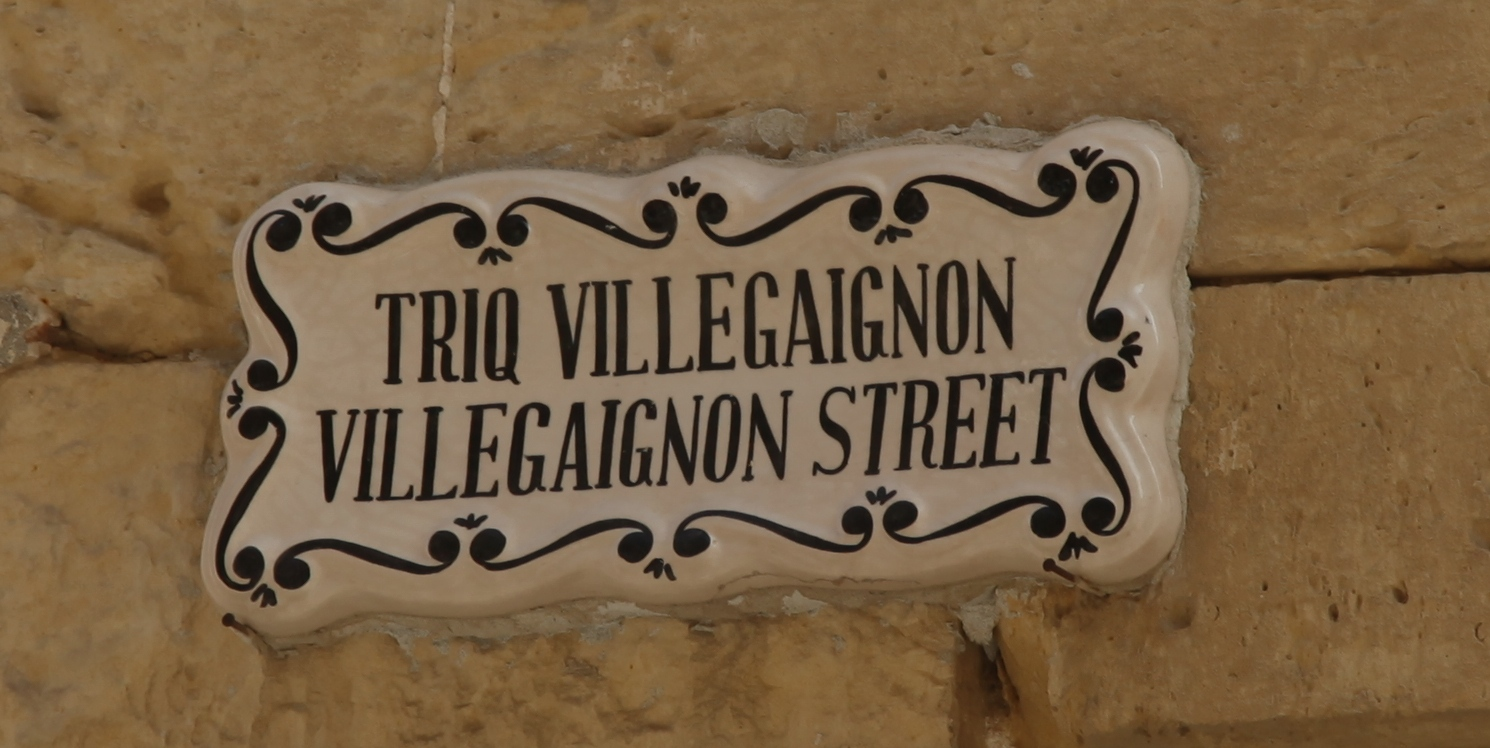
A street in Mdina, Malta named after Villegagnon.

In his book, Brazil, A Land of the Future, Austrian writer Stefan Zweig describes the colorful character of Villegagnon:

Nicolas Durand de Villegaignon, half pirate, half scientist, a dubious but attractive figure, is a typical product of the Renaissance (...) He has been brilliant in war and a dilettante in the arts. He has been praised by Ronsard and feared by the Court, because his character is incalculable. Hating any regular occupation, despising the most enviable positions and the highest honours, his volatile spirit prefers to be free to indulge unhampered its fantastic moods. The Huguenots believe he is a Catholic and the Catholics believe he's a Huguenot. Nobody knows which side he is serving, and he himself probably doesn't know much more than that he wants to do something big, something different from anyone else, something wild and daring, something romantic and extraordinary.

In the 2012 French-Portuguese-Brazilian TV series Rouge Brésil/Vermelho Brasil (Red Brazil), which focuses on the history of France Antarctique, Villegagnon (spelled Villegaignon) is portrayed by Swedish actor Stellan Skarsgård.

The island in Rio de Janeiro where he resided still bears his name Villegagnon Island.

A street in the Maltese city of Mdina is named after Villegagnon.

He appears as an important supporting character in The Course of Fortune by Tony Rothman (J. Boylston, 2015), a novel that concerns the events leading to the Great Siege of Malta, 1565.

He is a supporting character in Dorothy Dunnett's novel The Disorderly Knights, the third volume of her Lymond Chronicles series.

The knight is featured in Eight Pointed Cross by Marthese Fenech (BDL 2011), a historical novel, the first of a trilogy, now completed, that culminates in the Great Siege of Malta, 1565.

Durand is a non-playable character in the Arariboia campaign of the recent DLC "The Last Chieftains" for Age of Empires II.

== See also ==
- Jean de Cointac
- Villegagnon Island
- Guanabara Confession of Faith

== Sources ==
English

- Campbell, Thomas Joseph (1915). Pioneer laymen of North America. New York, The America Press. pp. 50–65.
- Howgego, Raymond John, ed. (2003). "Villegagnon, Nicolas Durand de". Encyclopedia of Exploration to 1800. Hordern House. ISBN 1875567364.
- McGrath, John (1996). "Polemic and History in French Brazil, 1555-1560". The Sixteenth Century Journal. 27 (2): 385–397. doi:10.2307/2544140. ISSN 0361-0160.
- Shannon, Silvia Castro (1997). "Military Outpost or Protestant Refuge: Villegagnon's Expedition to Brazil in 1555". Proceedings of the Meeting of the French Colonial Historical Society. 21: 1–13. ISSN 0362-7055.
- Whatley, Janet (1990). Introduction. History of a Voyage to the Land of Brazil. By Lery, Jean De. University of California Press. pp. xv–xl. ISBN 978-0-520-91380-6.

French

- Arthur Heulhard (1897). Villegagnon roi d'Amérique, un homme de mer au XVIe siècle 15101572 (in French). E. Leroux.
