= Guanabara Bay =

Bay in Rio de Janeiro (state), Brazil

- Baía de Guanabara (Portuguese)
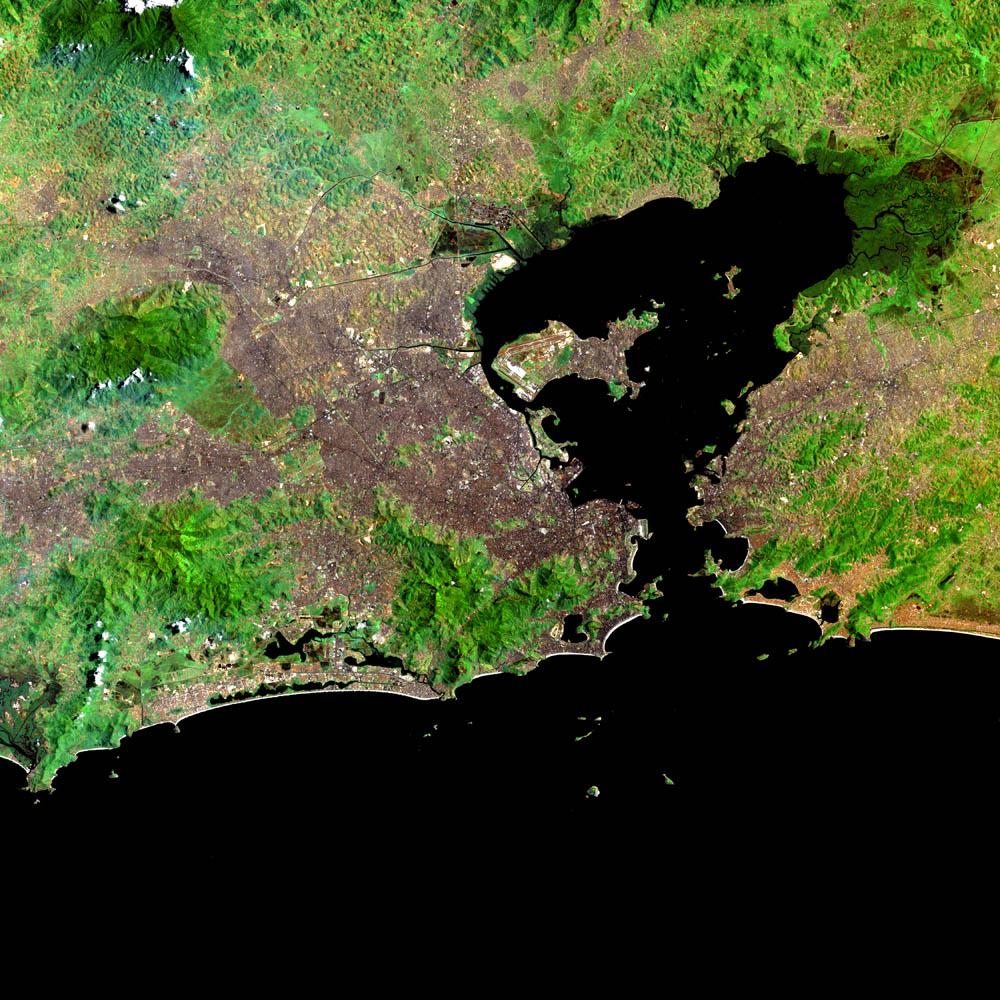
- Satellite image of Guanabara Bay

- Location within Brazil Location within Rio de Janeiro (state)
- Location: Rio de Janeiro, Brazil
- Coordinates: 22°47′25″S 43°9′20″W
- Type: Bay
- Primary inflows: Acari; Carioca; Iguaçu; Macacu; Suruí; and others
- Primary outflows: South Atlantic
- Basin countries: Brazil
- Max. length: 31 km (19 mi)
- Max. width: 28 km (17 mi)
- Surface area: 384 km^{2} (148 sq mi)
- Average depth: 5.7 m (19 ft)
- Max. depth: 50 m (160 ft)
- Water volume: 1.87 km^{3} (1,520,000 acre⋅ft)
- Islands: Ilha do Governador, Ilha de Paquetá, and others
- Settlements: Rio de Janeiro, Niterói, Duque de Caxias, São Gonçalo

Guanabara Bay (Portuguese: baía de Guanabara, baía da Guanabara, IPA: [baˈi.ɐ da ɡwɐnaˈbaɾɐ]) is an oceanic bay in Southeast Brazil in the state of Rio de Janeiro. On its western shore lie the cities of Rio de Janeiro and Duque de Caxias, and on its eastern shore are the cities of Niterói and São Gonçalo. Four other municipalities surround the bay's shores. Guanabara Bay is the second largest bay in area in Brazil (after the All Saints' Bay), at 384 square kilometres (148 sq mi), with a perimeter of 143 kilometres (89 mi).

Guanabara Bay is 31 kilometres (19 mi) long and 28 kilometres (17 mi) wide at its maximum. Its 1.5 kilometres (0.93 mi) wide mouth is flanked at the eastern tip by the Pico do Papagaio (Parrot's Peak) and the western tip by Pão de Açúcar (Sugar Loaf).

The name Guanabara comes from the Tupi language, goanã-pará, from gwa "bay", plus nã "similar to" and ba'ra "sea". Other glosses include hidden water, lagoon of the sea, and bosom of the sea.

== History ==
View of Rio de Janeiro from Guanabara Bay (early 20th century picture).

Tamoio and Tupiniquim natives inhabited the shores of the bay when Portuguese explorers Gaspar de Lemos and Gonçalo Coelho first encountered it on January 1, 1502. Accordingly, it was given the name Rio de Janeiro by the Portuguese. While it is widely believed that the designation of rio—which in modern Portuguese means "river"—was the result of the explorers mistaking the bay with a river mouth, it is likely that they knew it was a bay, but called it a "river" nonetheless because at the time, the term was often applied to other bodies of water—such as bays or rias..

After the initial arrival of the Portuguese, no significant European settlements were established until French colonists and soldiers, under the Huguenot Admiral Nicolas Durand de Villegaignon invaded the region in 1555 to establish the France Antarctique. They stayed briefly on Lajes Island, then moved to Serigipe Island, near the shore, where they built Fort Coligny. After they were expelled by Portuguese military expeditions in 1563, the colonial government built fortifications in several points of Guanabara Bay, rendering it almost impregnable against a naval attack from the sea. They were the Santa Cruz, São João, Lajes and Villegaignon forts, forming a fearsome crossfire rectangle of big naval guns. Other islands were adapted by the Navy to host naval storehouses, hospitals, drydocks, oil reservoirs and the National Naval Academy.

Underwater exploration in the bay was disallowed by the Brazilian government in 1985 amid a dispute with American writer and treasure hunter Robert Marx, who claimed to have found evidence of a Roman shipwreck. Carl Feagans tells of 16 amphorae made for antiques-lover Americo Santarelli in 1960 or 1961, all 16 of which deliberately sunk in the bay for them to acquire the look of ancient artefacts covered in barnacles and corals; 4 of the 16 original amphorae were subsequently recovered, leaving 12 scattered about the bay, where two were found by lobster divers in 1974.

== Description ==
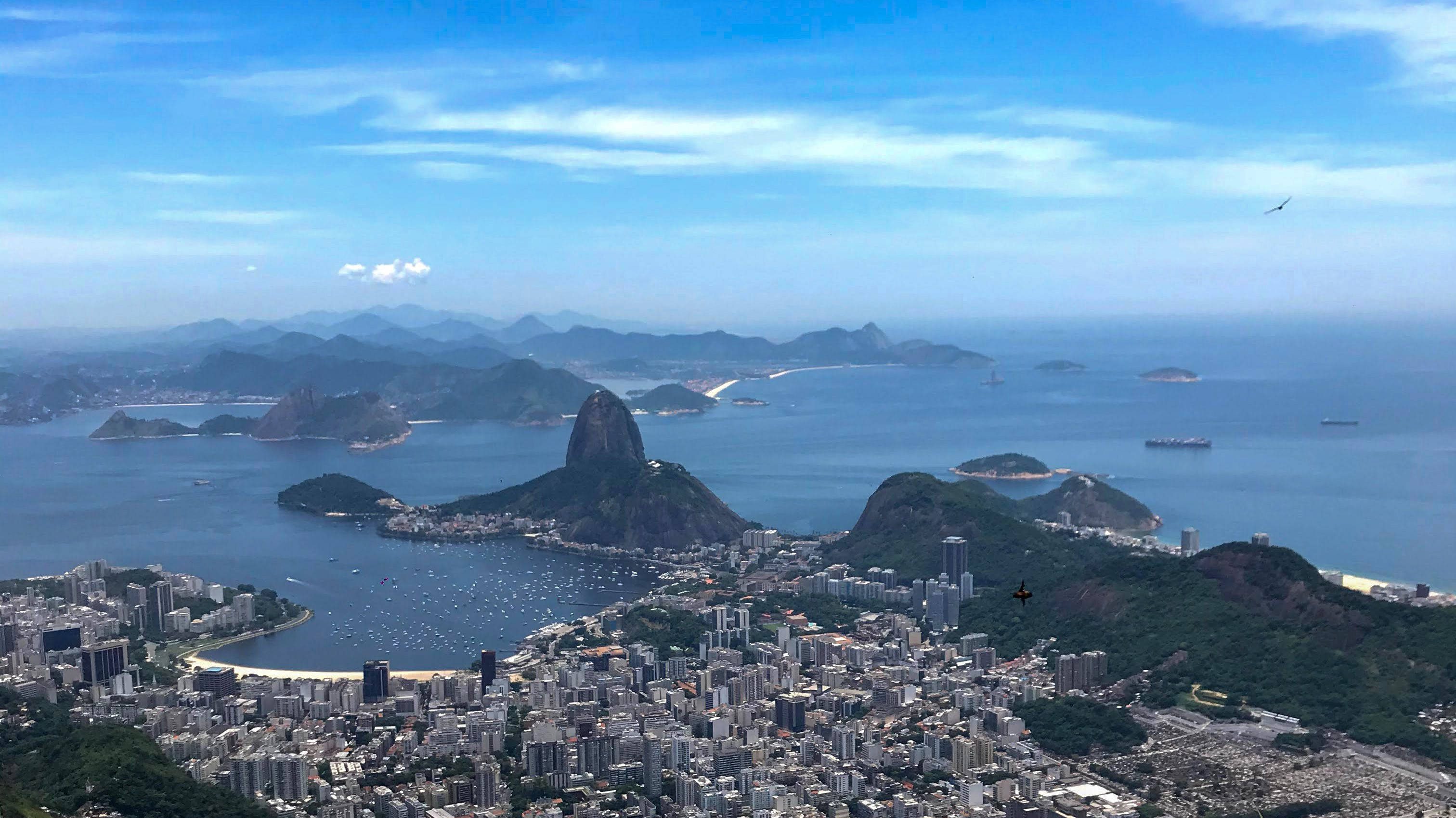
Guanabara Bay seen from Christ the Redeemer.

There are more than 130 islands dotting the bay, including:

- Lajes
- Ilha do Governador – site of Rio de Janeiro's Galeão - Antônio Carlos Jobim International Airport
- Ilha de Paquetá
- Ilha das Cobras
- Flores
- Ilha Fiscal
- Ilha da Boa Viagem
- Villegagnon
- Fundão

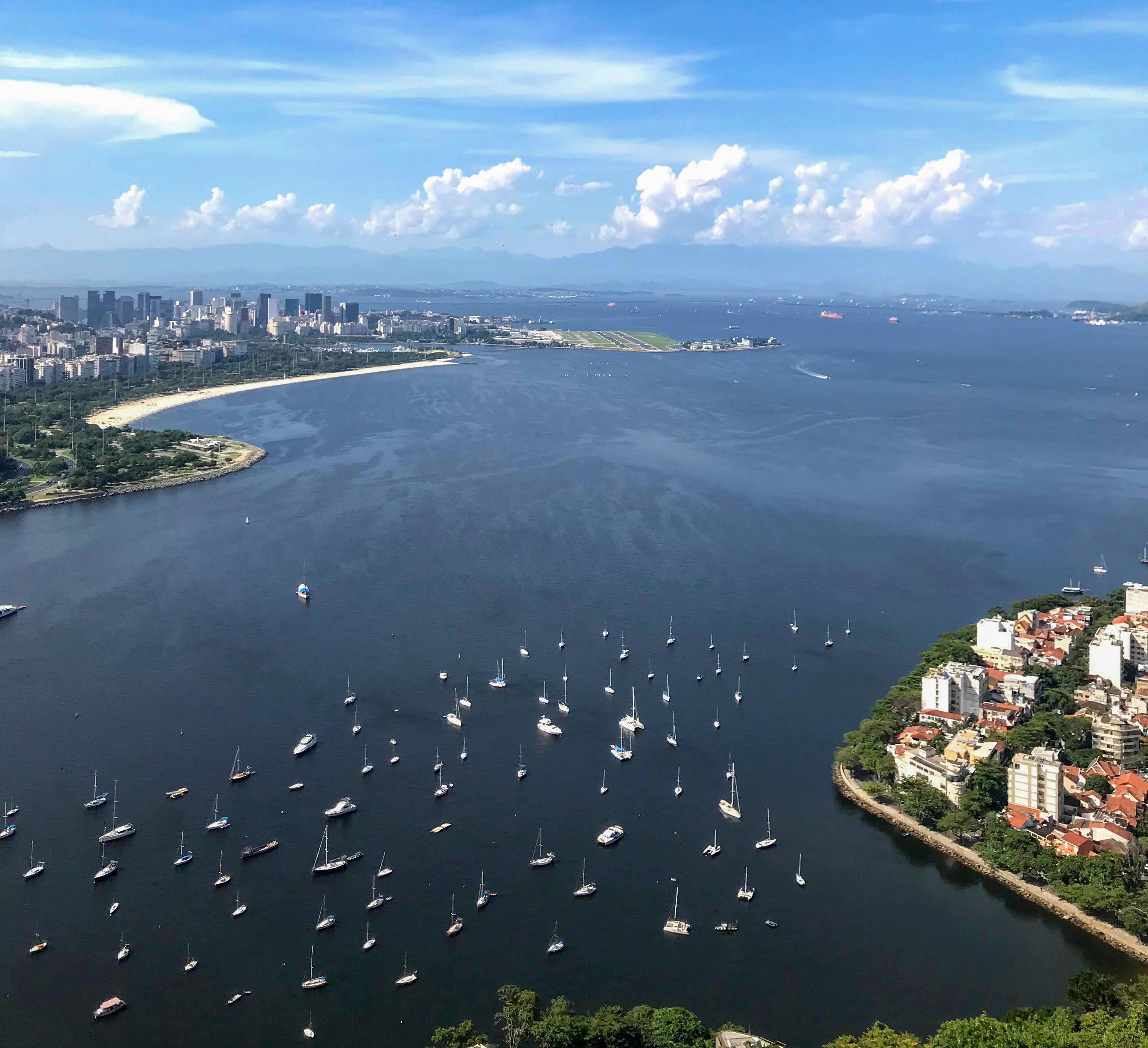
Guanabara Bay seen from Sugarloaf Mountain.

The bay is crossed by the Rio-Niterói Bridge (13.29 kilometres (8.26 mi) long and with a central span 72 metres (236 ft) high) and there is heavy boat and ship traffic, including regular ferryboat lines. The Port of Rio de Janeiro, as well as the city's two airports, Galeão - Antônio Carlos Jobim International Airport (on Governador Island) and Santos Dumont Airport (on reclaimed land next to downtown Rio), are on its shores. The Federal University of Rio de Janeiro main campus is on the artificial Fundão Island. A maze of smaller bridges interconnect the two largest islands, Fundão and Governador, to the mainland.

There is an Environmental Protection Area (APA), which is mostly in the municipality of Guapimirim and given the name of Guapimirim APA.

== Environment ==
Guanabara Bay's once rich and diversified ecosystem has suffered extensive damage in recent decades, particularly along its mangrove areas. The bay has been heavily impacted by urbanization, deforestation, and pollution of its waters with sewage, garbage, and oil spills. As of 2014, more than 70% of the sewage from 12 million inhabitants of Rio de Janeiro now flows into the bay untreated.

There have been three major oil spills in Guanabara Bay. The most recent was in 2000 when a leaking Petrobras underwater pipeline released 1,300,000 litres (340,000 US gal) of oil into the bay, destroying large swaths of the mangrove ecosystem. Recovery measures are currently being attempted, but more than a decade after the incident, the mangrove areas have not returned to life.

One of the world's largest landfills is at Jardim Gramacho adjacent to Guanabara Bay. It was closed in 2012 after 34 years of operation. The landfill attracted attention from environmentalists and it supported 1,700 people scavenging for recyclable materials.

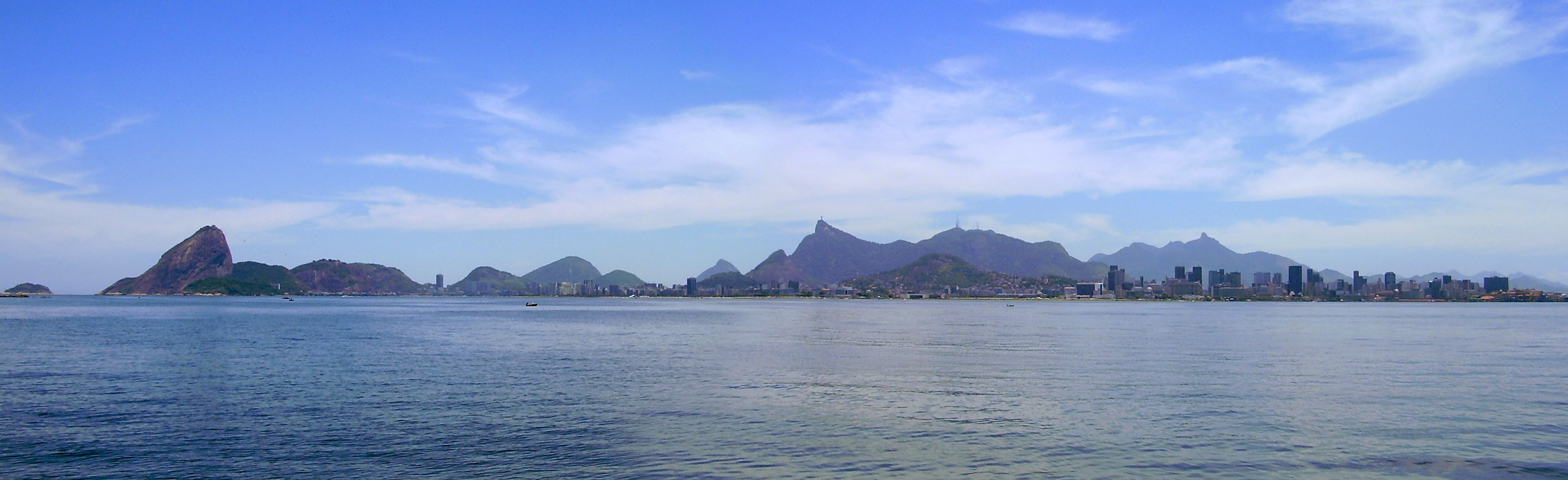
View of Rio de Janeiro from Guanabara Bay

In June 2014, Dutch windsurfer and former Olympic and world champion Dorian van Rijsselberghe made an urgent appeal to government and industry in the Netherlands to collaborate in cleaning up the bay, together with the Plastic Soup Foundation. The Dutch government picked up the message and formulated a Clean Urban Delta Initiative Rio de Janeiro together with a consortium of Dutch industry, knowledge institutes and NGOs which will be presented to the Brazilian authorities in the State of Rio de Janeiro.

As part of the preparations for the 2016 Summer Olympics in Rio, the government was supposed to improve the conditions, but progress has been slow. There have been concerns that the efforts may only be short-term and abandoned following the Games, as there would be little political incentive to continue with them.

The marine ecosystem of Guanabara Bay was severely damaged; the bay was once a whaling ground, and today, whales are no longer or rarely seen while Bryde's whales can be seen around the bay entrance. The bay is also home to a population of botos and this population faces severe risks of population decline.

== See also ==
- List of deepest natural harbours
