= War of the Tamoio Confederation =

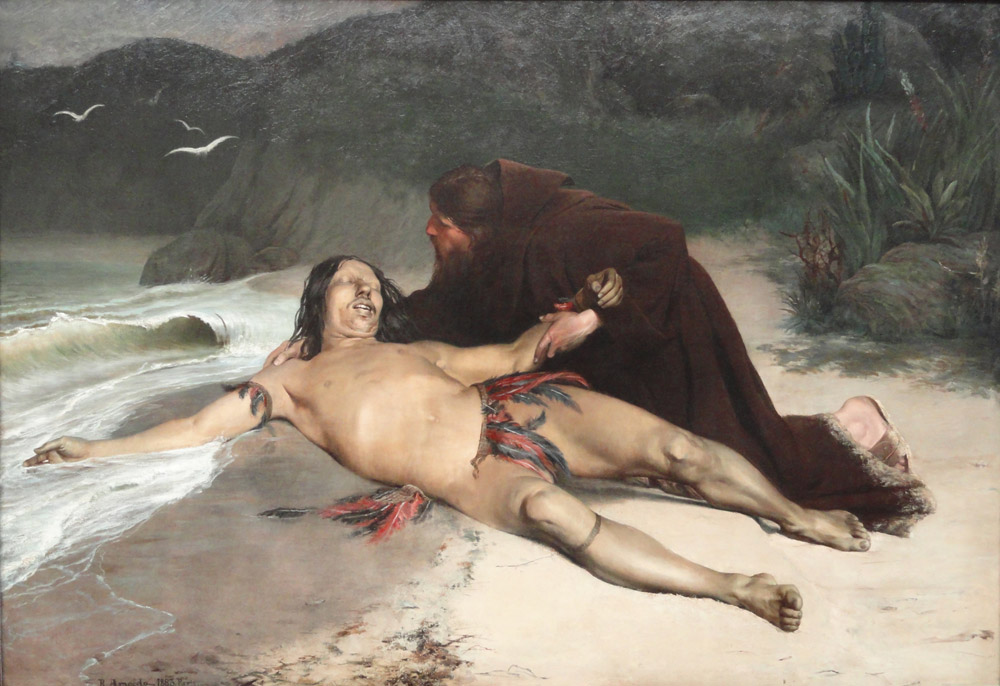
- The Last Tamoio, by Rodolfo Amoedo (1883)
Date	c. 1554 to c. 1567
Location	State of São Paulo and Rio de Janeiro
Result	Portuguese victory

Belligerents
Portuguese Empire; Indigenous Alies	Tamoio Confederation; France Antarctique

Commanders and leaders
Mem de Sá; Duarte da Costa; Brás Cubas; Estácio de Sá; Arariboia; Tibiriçá	Cunhambebe (until 1555); Aimberê; Coaquira; Nicolas Durand de Villegagnon

The War of the Tamoio Confederation was a military conflict fought between the Portuguese colonizers and the Tamoio, a loose confederation of mostly Tupinambá origin in the southeast of Brazil, in the areas corresponding to modern-day São Paulo and Rio de Janeiro. The Tamoios were led by the chiefs Aimberê and Cunhambebe and received support from the French colonizers of France Antarctique, led by Nicolas Durand de Villegagnon. In addition to the Tamoios, other indigenous groups also participated in the conflict, including the Tupiniquins, the Aimoré, the Goitacá and the Guaianá.

The war ended with the arrival of Portuguese reinforcements led by Captain Estácio de Sá, which initiated the expulsion of the French and the decimation of their Tamoio allies.

The conflict is partially documented in the writings of the German mercenary Hans Staden, who was held prisoner by the Tupinambá in the region of present-day Ubatuba for nine months. During this time, he accompanied Chief Cunhambebe on his military expeditions against the Portuguese in the area corresponding to modern-day Bertioga.

== Beginning of the war ==
=== Precedents ===
With the intensification of colonization in the Captaincy of São Vicente, the demand for Indigenous labor on the newly established Portuguese plantations grew steadily. To meet this demand, settlers relied on two primary strategies: trading European-made tools in exchange for communal labor on the mills, and fomenting wars among different Indigenous groups in order to acquire enslaved individuals captured during these conflicts.

Among Indigenous practices for establishing alliances with the Portuguese was what became known as cunhadismo, through which a man became a member of a particular people by marrying a woman belonging to that group. Through this practice, João Ramalho, a Portuguese man who had arrived in the Americas by unknown means before the effective colonization of the territory, married Mbici, the daughter of the Tupiniquim chief Tibiriçá, also known as Bartira. João Ramalho then began living among the Indigenous people and adopting their customs. By 1532, when the town of São Vicente was founded on the coast, the Portuguese man had already embraced many of the natives’ customs, having married multiple women and fathered a large number of children, who, in turn, were married to the main local chiefs. Because of this, his importance was quickly recognized by the colonizers, who soon established friendly relations with the Tupiniquim of São Vicente.

The collaboration of the Tupiniquim with the Portuguese resulted in a strong alliance that made possible, among other events, the founding of the Jesuit college of São Paulo de Piratininga in 1554 by the Jesuits Manuel da Nóbrega and José de Anchieta in Tibiriçá’s village. The rivalry among the different Indigenous nations, which existed prior to the European invasion, combined with the demand for enslaved people to support the colonization enterprise, led the Portuguese and Tupiniquim to attack the Tupinambá and other peoples who resisted colonial domination militarily.

=== Trigger ===
An attack by the Portuguese on the village of the Tupinambá chief Cairuçu resulted in his capture, along with his people, by Governor Brás Cubas. Imprisoned under extremely harsh conditions, Cairuçu died in captivity. His son, Aimberê, sparked a revolt and escaped, returning to the village of Ubatuba (Uwa-ttybi), where he assumed leadership of his people and declared war on the Portuguese colonists and their former Tupiniquim allies. To strengthen the uprising, he met with Tupinambá leaders Pindobuçu, from Iperoig, and Cunhambebe, from the area of present-day Angra dos Reis, establishing the fortification of Uruçumirim and becoming co-leader of the Tamoio Confederation alongside Cunhambebe. Later, Cunhambebe assumed full leadership of the Tamoio Confederation and secured the support of the Goitacá and Aimoré peoples. The declaration of war coincided with the arrival of the French in Rio de Janeiro, who aimed to colonize territories belonging to the Tupis as well as areas recently conquered by the Portuguese.

=== French participation ===
To support the conflict against the Portuguese, the Frenchman Villegaignon provided weapons to the Tupinambá under Cunhambebe's leadership. However, an epidemic devastated many of the Indigenous fighters, including Cunhambebe himself, significantly weakening the uprising. With Cunhambebe's death, his son, also named Cunhambebe, would succeed him.

== The confederation ==
Aimberê, from the village of Ubatuba (of uncertain etymology, possibly from U'ubá-tyba, “gathering of arrow cane,” or Ubá-tyba, “gathering of canoes”), met at what is today Mangaratiba, on the western coast of Rio de Janeiro, with other Tupinambá chiefs: Pindobuçu, Coaquira; Cunhambebe and Guayxará. Under Cunhambebe's leadership, and with the support of other Indigenous nations such as the Goitacá, the Tupinambá organized an alliance against the Tupiniquim and the Portuguese.

The French supplied the Tupinambá with weapons for the conflict, motivated by their interest in occupying Guanabara Bay. Following the death of Cunhambebe during an epidemic, Aimberê assumed leadership of the confederation. His strategy focused on further expanding the alliance by securing the support of the Tupiniquim. To this end, he asked Jagoaranhó, chief of the Tupiniquim and nephew of Tibiriçá, to persuade his people to abandon the Portuguese and join the confederation.

== Indigenous conflicts ==
After the death of Cunhambebe, Aimberê continued the revolt against the Portuguese and sought to persuade the Tupiniquim to join his side. He contacted their leader, Tibiriçá, through his nephew Jagoaranhó and arranged a meeting to formalize the confederation. When the Tamoios arrived at the village, Tibiriçá declared his loyalty to the Portuguese and killed his nephew, triggering an attack that resulted in the decimation of a large portion of the Guaianá people.

=== Peace of Iperoig ===
Thanks to fierce resistance and French support, the Portuguese decided to negotiate a truce with the Tamoios. They would send the Jesuits Manuel da Nóbrega and José de Anchieta, founders of São Paulo, to lead the negotiation at the town of Iperoig, led by Coaquira, modern-day Ubatuba. After days of negociation, the terms of Cunhambebe (the son of the chief of the same name) and Coaquira were accepted and a comission was sent back to São Vicente to seal the armstice with the Portuguese authorities. In September 14, 1563, the truce known as Peace of Iperoig was established. During this period, the Portuguese were compelled to release all enslaved Indigenous people. The peace would last only a year, and would be broken when the Portuguese forces attacked Coaquira's village

=== Battle of Uruçumirim ===
In May 1st, 1565, Estácio de Sá would establish the town of São Sebastião do Rio de Janeiro, but he realized that he could not remove the Tamoios from Rio alone. Estácio and his ally Arariboia would fight together to defend the palisade protecting the village, until the settlement was moved to a better position at Morro do Castelo (Castle Hill).

In 1567, the joint fleets of Mem de Sá and Cristóvão de Barros would arrive in Rio de Janeiro and engage the French and the Tamoios at the Battle of Uruçumirim.

Combat would start on the 20th of January, the day of Saint Sebastian. The Portuguese would attack three Tamoio towns in the region of modern Rio de Janeiro. The village under the command of the young chief Uruçumirim, located in the modern Glória Hill, was the first to be attacked by the Portuguese fleet. They would separate their forces into two battalions, one under Cristóvão de Barros and the second under Estácio de Sá, who would take the position in two days. During the battle, Estácio would be hit by a poisoned arrow and would die after a month.

The second town to be attacked would be the island of Paranapuã, now known as Governador Island, under the control of chief Paranapuçu. The Island was fortified with a double palisade and was defended by over a thousand natives as well as French artillery. The battle would last three days and result in large casualties on both sides.

The last Tamoio fortification was located in what today is the city of São Gonçalo. Despite having a defensive system with three overlapping fences, the Portuguese met no resistance when taking the position, as most Tupinambá and French troops fled, while the remainder of the population surrendered.

Afterwards, a total of 160 villages would be raided, while the rest of the Tamoios would die by European introduced diseases, putting effectively an end to the war.

In 1567, Mem de Sá would grant Arariboia and the Teminimó peoples a patch of land opposite of hill to found their own town, which would become the city of Niterói. He would justify this to Queen Catherine by arguing the importance of the presence of Arariboia for the wellbeing of the colony.

== In popular culture ==
More than three centuries later, the conflict became the subject of the poem "A Confederação dos Tamoios" (The Confederation of the Tamoios) by the Romantic poet Gonçalves de Magalhães, written in 1856.

In 1883, the historical episode was also depicted by Rodolfo Amoedo in his painting "O último tamoio" (The Last Tamoio).
