= History of Brazil =

Before the arrival of the Europeans, the lands that now constitute Brazil were inhabited and settled by diverse tribes for thousands of years. The Portuguese landed in the so-called "New World" on April 22, 1500, commanded by Pedro Álvares Cabral, an explorer on his way to India under the sponsorship of the Kingdom of Portugal and the support of the Catholic Church.

Between the 16th to the early 19th century, Brazil was created and expanded as a colony, kingdom, and an integral part of the Portuguese Empire. Brazil was briefly named "Land of the Holy Cross" by Portuguese explorers and crusaders before being named "Land of Brazil" by the Brazilian-Portuguese settlers and merchants dealing with brazilwood. The country expanded south along the coast and west along the Amazon River and other inland rivers from the original 15 hereditary captaincy colonies established on the northeast Atlantic coast east of the Tordesillas Line, an imaginary line in the form of a treaty signed in 1494 that divided the Portuguese domain to the east from the Spanish domain to the west. The country's borders were only finalized in the early 20th century, with most of the expansion occurring before the independence, resulting in the largest contiguous territory in the Americas.

On September 7, 1822, prince regent Pedro declared Brazil's independence from Portugal and so the Kingdom of Brazil became the Empire of Brazil, in which he became its first emperor. In 1889, a military coup toppled the monarchy and the First Brazilian Republic was established, albeit with the first five years of the republic as a military dictatorship. Growing political instability within the republic brought its downfall in 1930, when a military coup headed by Getúlio Vargas overthrew the republic. From 1930 to 1945, Brazil was ruled by Vargas in an authoritarian dictatorship. Brazil participated in World War II on the side of the allies' during his rule. In 1945, Vargas' was deposed, and from 1945 to 1964, democracy was briefly restored in the Fourth Brazilian Republic. In 1964, with support from the United States, another military dictatorship was established through a military coup. Under President Emílio Garrastazu Médici's tenure, from 1969 to 1974, Brazil experienced what has been called the "Brazilian Miracle". The regime ruled until 1985, after which civilian governance and democracy was restored.

== Pre-Cabraline history ==
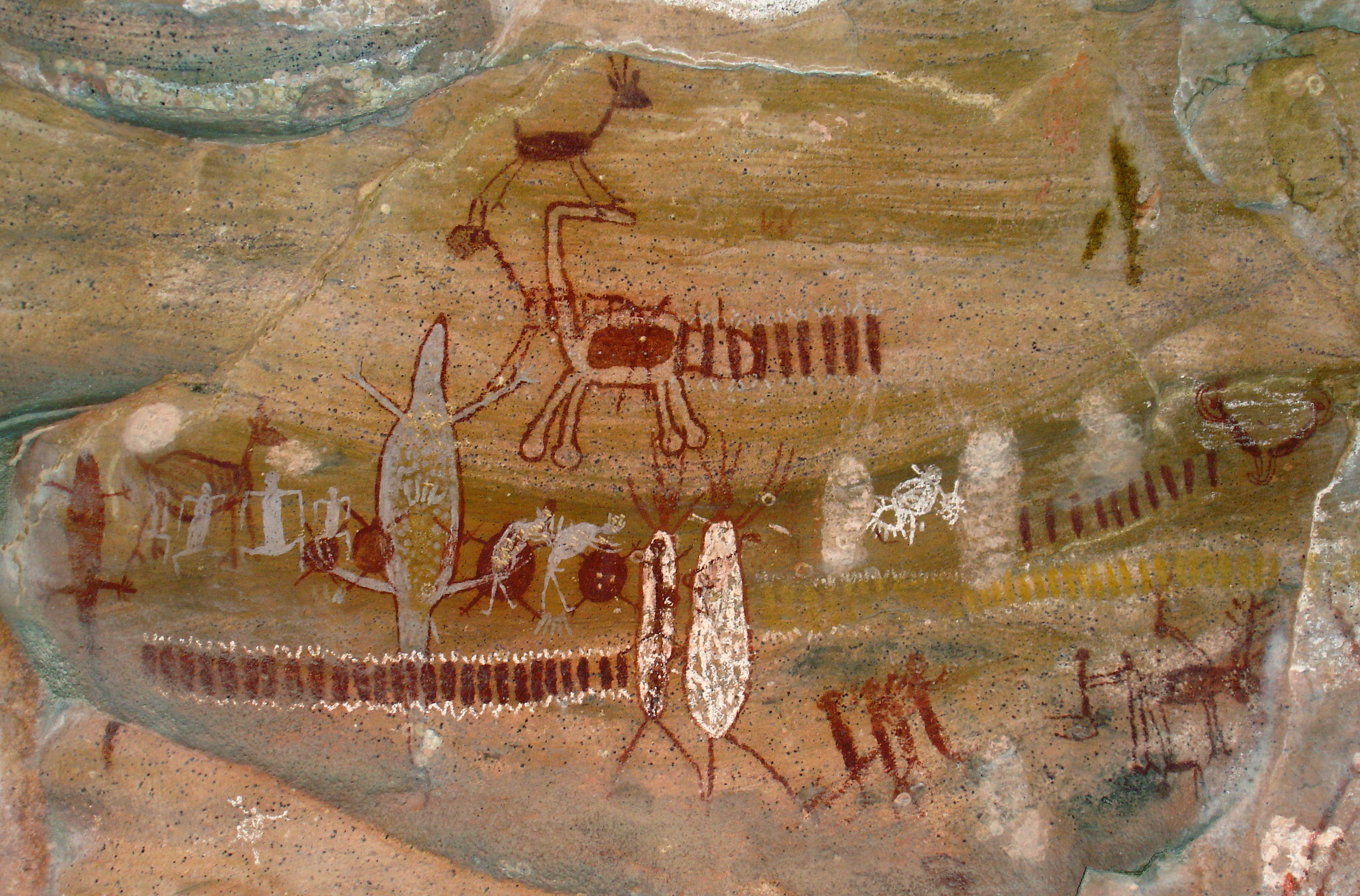
Cave painting at Serra da Capivara National Park. This area has the largest concentration of prehistoric sites in the Americas.

Some of the earliest human remains found in the Americas, Luzia Woman, were found in the area of Pedro Leopoldo, Minas Gerais and provide evidence of human habitation going back at least 11,000 years.

When Portuguese explorers arrived in Brazil, the region was inhabited by hundreds of different native tribes, "the earliest going back at least 10,000 years in the highlands of Minas Gerais". The dating of the origins of the first inhabitants, who were called "Indians" (índios) by the Portuguese, is still a matter of dispute among archaeologists. The earliest pottery ever found in the Western Hemisphere, radiocarbon-dated 8,000 years old, has been excavated in the Amazon basin of Brazil, near Santarém, providing evidence to overturn the assumption that the tropical forest region was too poor in resources to have supported a complex prehistoric culture. The current most widely accepted view of anthropologists, linguists and geneticists is that the early tribes were part of the first wave of migrant hunters who came into the Americas from Asia, either by land, across the Bering Strait, or by coastal sea routes along the Pacific, or both.

The Andes and the mountain ranges of northern South America created a rather sharp cultural boundary between the settled agrarian civilizations of the west coast and the semi-nomadic tribes of the east, who never developed written records or permanent monumental architecture. For this reason, very little is known about the history of Brazil before 1500. Archaeological remains (mainly pottery) indicate a complex pattern of regional cultural developments, internal migrations, and occasional large state-like federations.

At the time of European discovery, the territory of modern-day Brazil had as many as 2,000 tribes. The Indigenous peoples were traditionally mostly semi-nomadic tribes that subsisted on hunting, fishing, gathering, and migrant agriculture. When the Portuguese arrived in 1500, the Natives lived mainly on the coast and along the banks of major rivers.

Marajoara culture

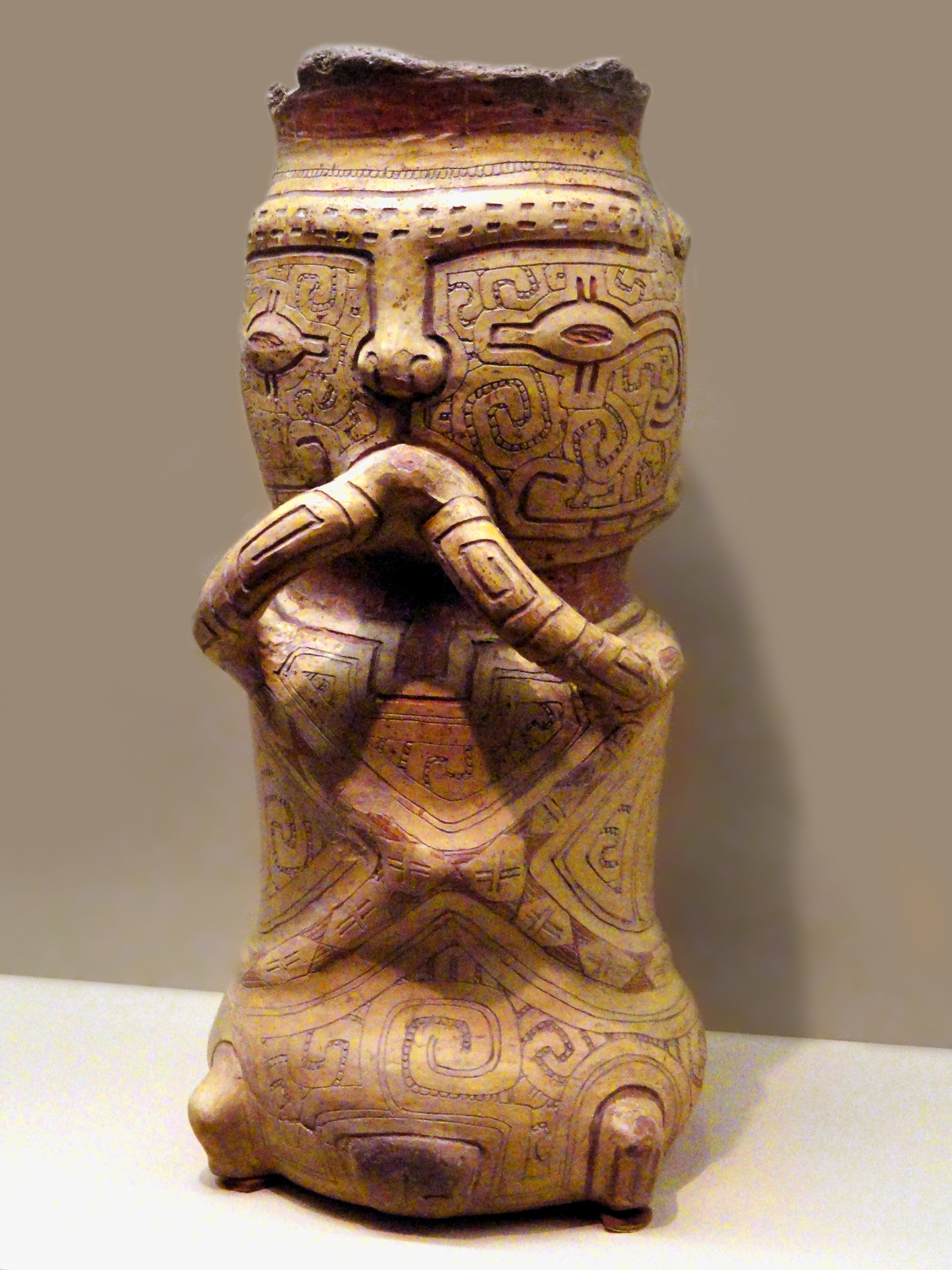
Burial urn

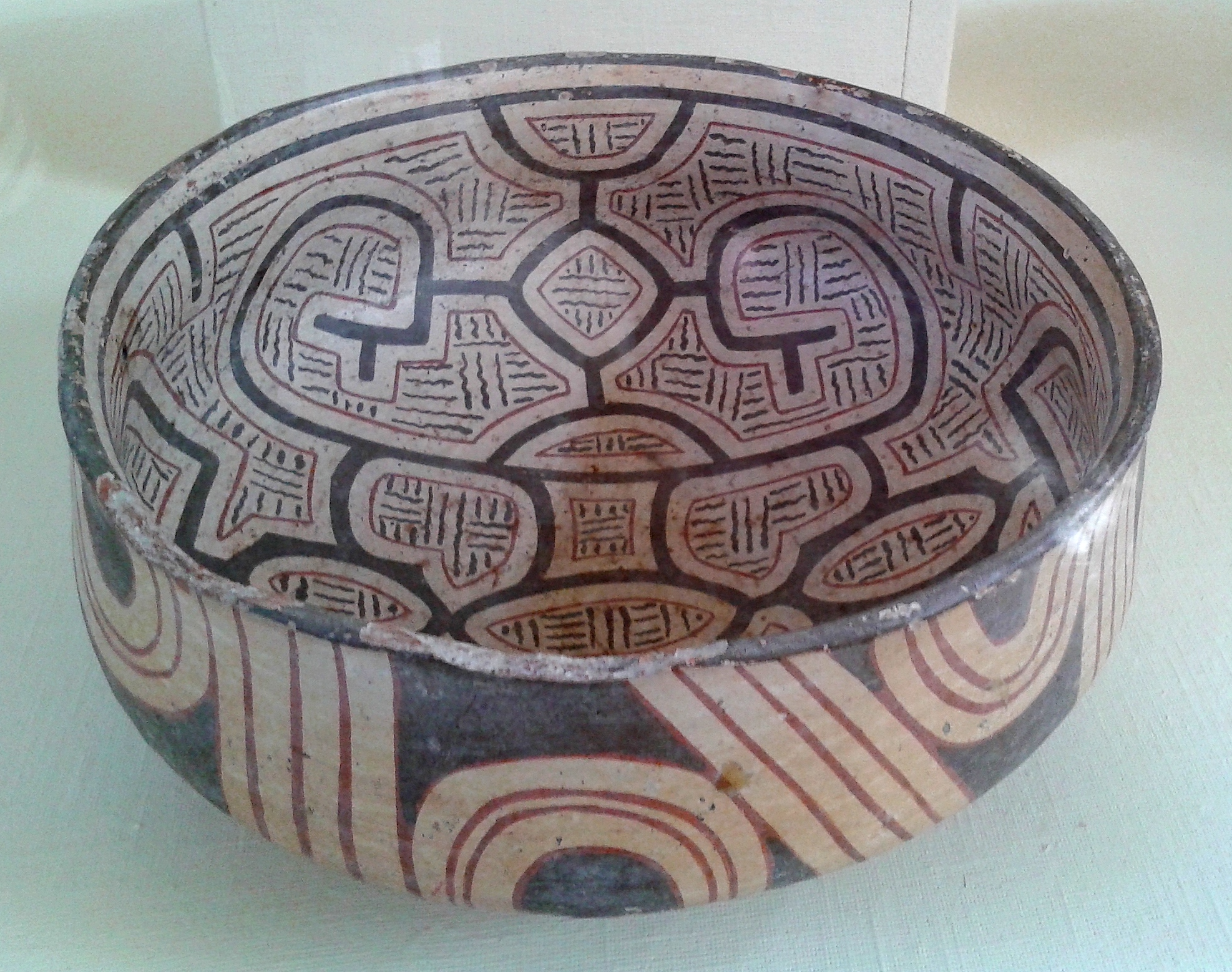
Marajoara bowl

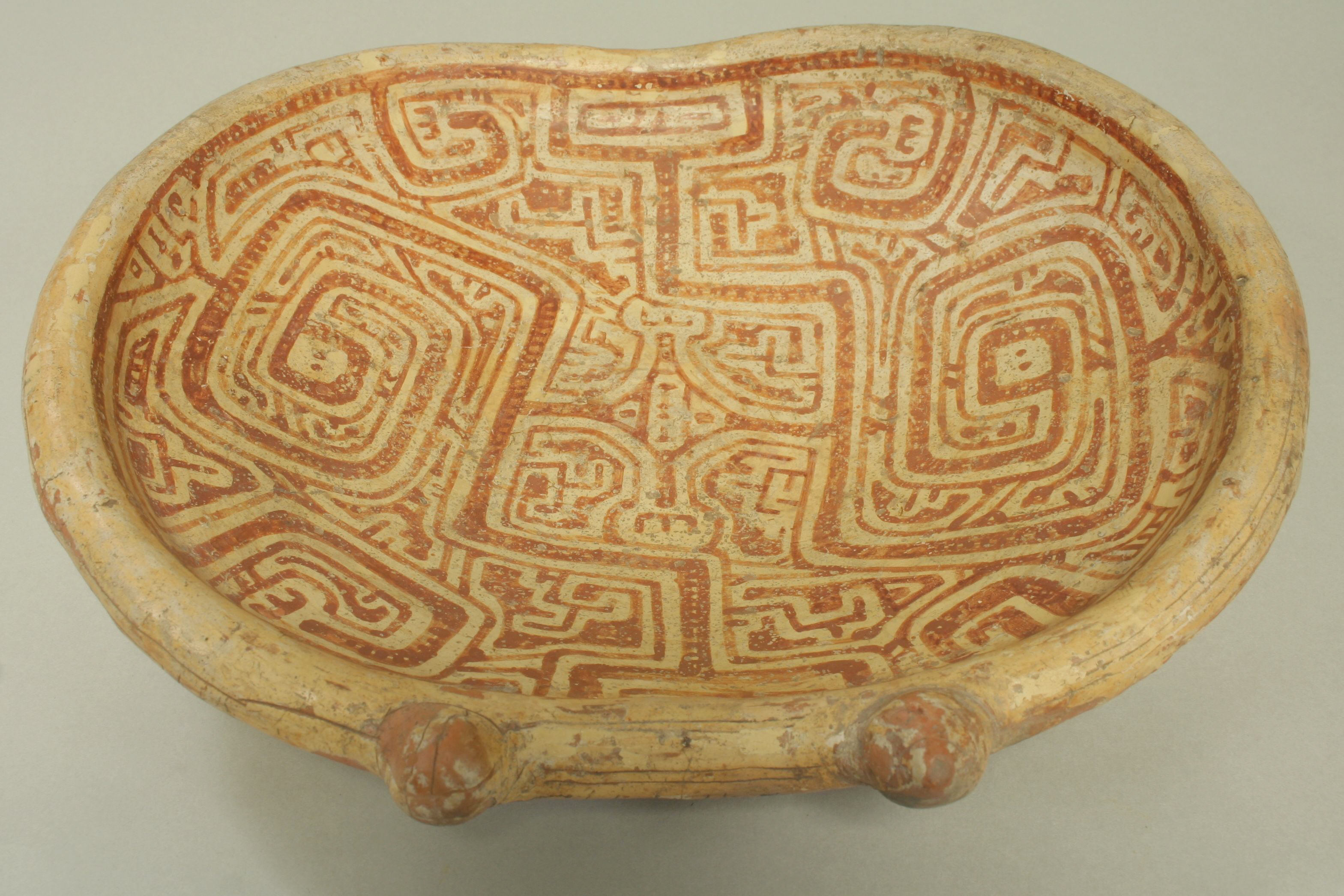
Marajoara plate

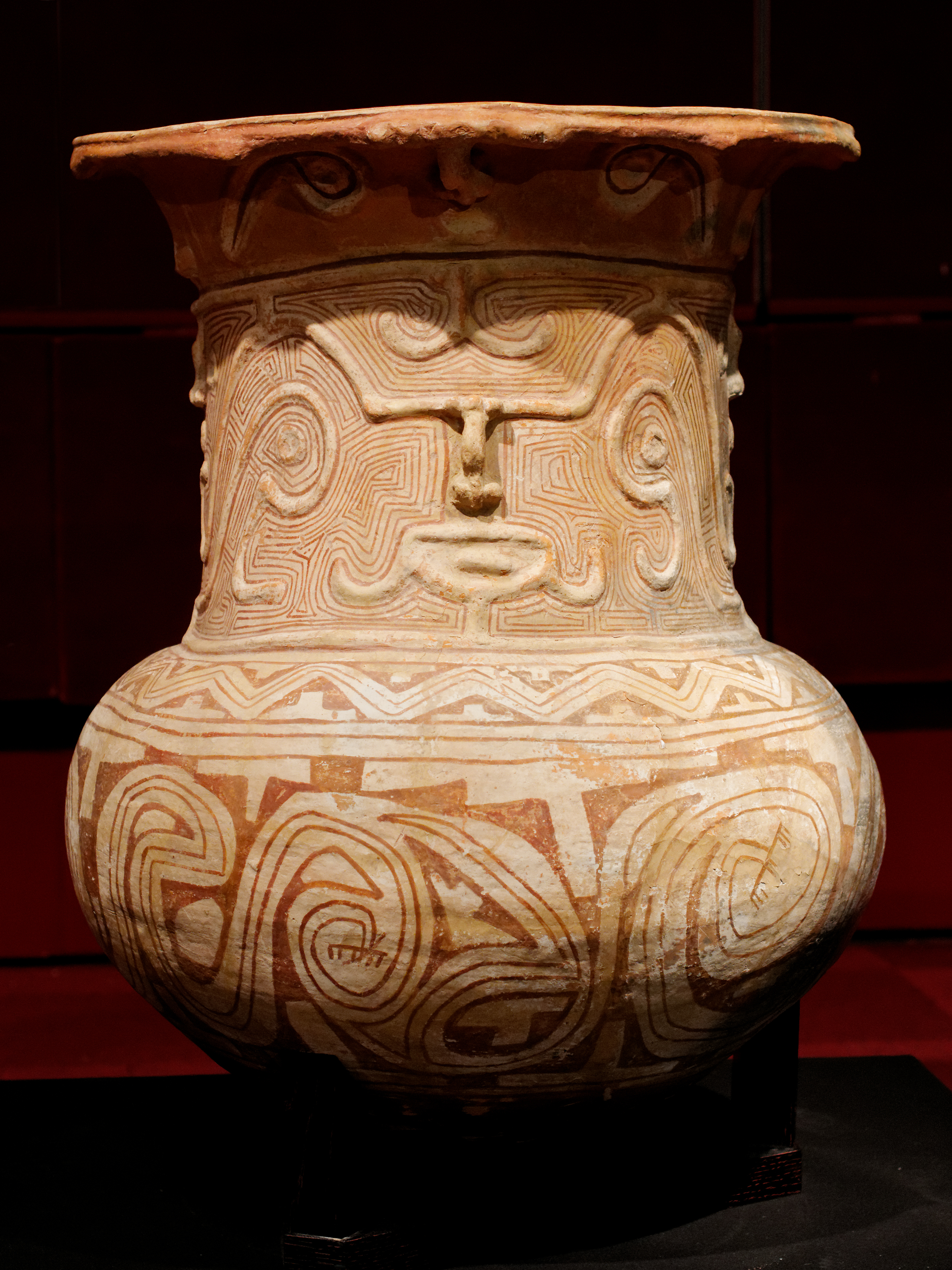
Funerary urn

Tribal warfare, anthropophagy, and the pursuit of brazilwood for its treasured red dye convinced the Portuguese that they should Christianize the natives. But the Portuguese, like the Spanish in their South American possessions, had brought diseases with them, against which many Natives were helpless due to lack of immunity. Measles, smallpox, tuberculosis, gonorrhea and influenza killed tens of thousands of indigenous people. The diseases spread quickly along the indigenous trade routes, and whole tribes were probably annihilated without ever coming in direct contact with Europeans.

=== Marajoara culture ===
Marajoara culture flourished on Marajó island at the mouth of the Amazon River. Archeologists have found sophisticated pottery in their excavations on the island. These pieces are large, and elaborately painted and incised with representations of plants and animals. These provided the first evidence that a complex society had existed in Marajó. Evidence of mound building further suggests that well-populated, complex and sophisticated settlements developed on this island, as only such settlements were believed capable of such extended projects as major earthworks.

The extent, level of complexity, and resource interactions of the Marajoara culture have been disputed. American archaeologist Betty Meggers, suggested in the 1950s that the society migrated from the Andes and settled on the island. Many researchers believed that the Andes were populated by Paleoindian migrants from North America who gradually moved south after being hunters on the plains.

In the 1980s, another American archaeologist, Anna Curtenius Roosevelt, led excavations and geophysical surveys of the mound Teso dos Bichos. She concluded that the society that constructed the mounds originated on the island itself.

The pre-Cabraline culture of Marajó may have developed social stratification and supported a population as large as 100,000 people. The Native Americans of the Amazon rainforest may have used their method of developing and working in Terra preta to make the land suitable for the large-scale agriculture needed to support large populations and complex social formations such as chiefdoms.

== Early Brazil ==
Early Brazil
Royal Flag (1495–1521)

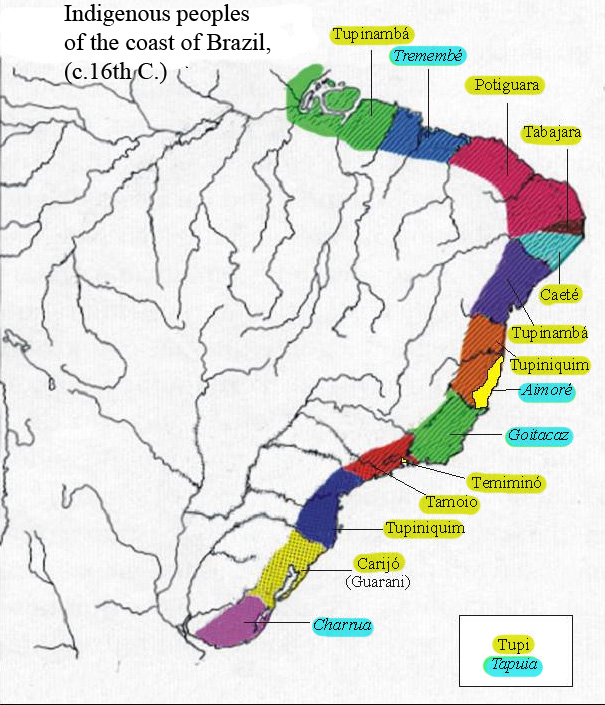
Distribution of Tupi and Tapuia people on the coast of Brazil, on the eve of colonialism in the 16th century

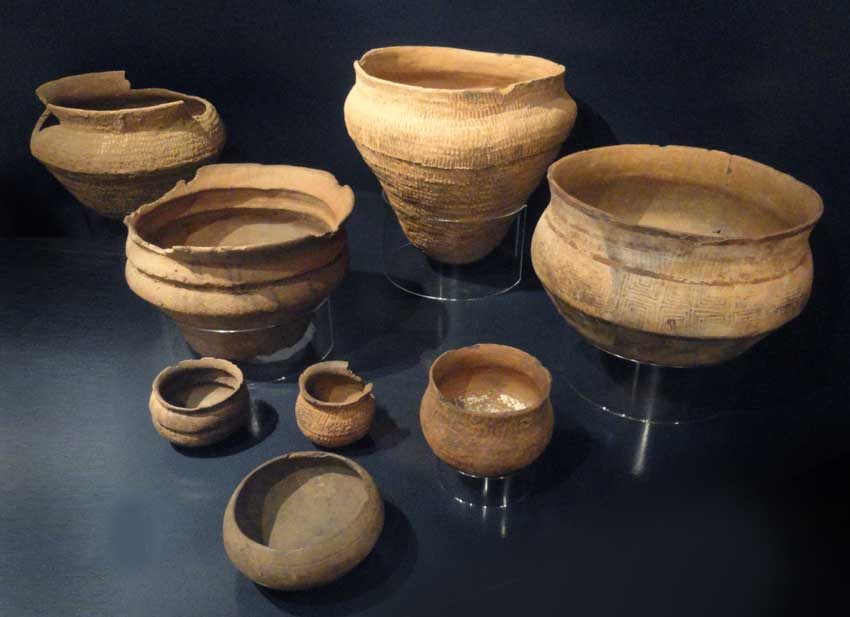
Guaraní ceramics

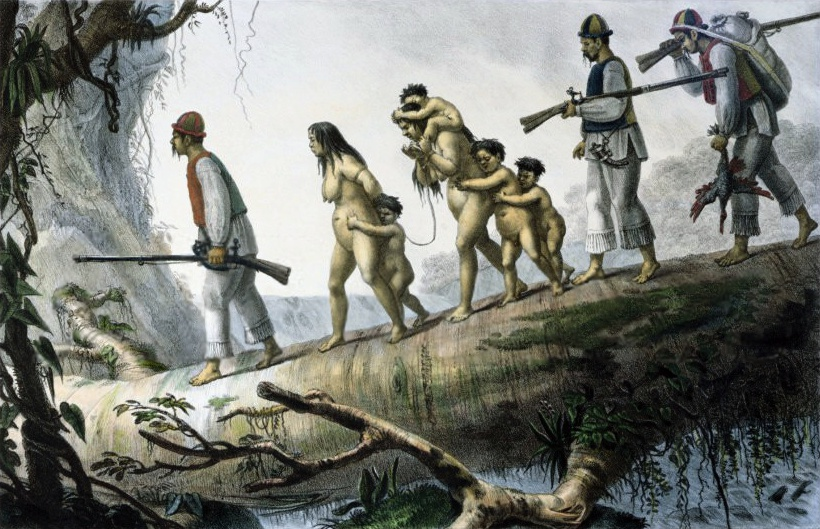
A Guaraní family captured by slave hunters. By Jean Baptiste Debret.

In 1493 the papal bull inter caetera divided claims to the New World territories between Spain and Portugal and was revised in 1494 by the Treaty of Tordesillas which moved the dividing line further west.

In late 1499 part of the expedition led by Alonso de Ojeda, in which Amerigo Vespucci took part, sighted Brazil. Shortly after the expedition led by Spanish navigator and explorer Vicente Yáñez Pinzón, a Spanish navigator who had accompanied Columbus in his first voyage of discovery to the Americas, reached the Cape of Santo Agostinho, a promontory located in the current state of Pernambuco, on 26 January 1500. This is the oldest confirmed European landing in Brazilian territory. Pinzón was unable to claim the land because of the Treaty of Tordesillas. In April 1500, Brazil was claimed for Portugal on the arrival of the Portuguese fleet commanded by Pedro Álvares Cabral. The Portuguese encountered stone-using natives divided into several tribes, many of whom shared the same Tupi–Guarani language family, and fought among themselves. Early names for the country included Santa Cruz (Holy Cross) and Terra dos Papagaios (Land of the Parrots). After European arrival, the land's major export was a type of tree that traders and colonists called pau-Brasil (Latin for wood red like an ember) or brazilwood from which came its final name. It is a large tree (Caesalpinia echinata) whose trunk yields a prized red dye, and was nearly wiped out due to overexploitation.

Until 1529 Portugal had little interest in settling Brazil as it was focused on its already profitable commerce with India, China, and the East Indies. This lack of interest allowed traders, pirates, and privateers of several countries to poach profitable Brazilwood in lands claimed by Portugal, with France setting up the short-lived colony of France Antarctique in 1555. In response, the Portuguese Crown devised a system to effectively settle Brazil. Through the hereditary Captaincies system, they divided Brazil into strips of land and donated them to Portuguese noblemen, who were in turn responsible for occupying and administering the lands while answering to the King. The system was later substituted for a dual state government in 1572, where the country was divided into the Northern Government based in Salvador and the Southern Government based in Rio de Janeiro.

The Portuguese settlers introduced and propagated old-world cultures such as rice, coffee, sugar, cows, chicken, pigs, bread (wheat), wine, oranges, horses, stonemasonry, metalworking and guitars (and more). There was also a mixing of peoples through intermarriage. Since colonial times Portuguese settlers intermarried with Indigenous and African populations. The most common marriages occurred between white (Portuguese settlers), Indigenous, and African populations. In the present, the largest ethnic groups include: those of mainly European descent (47.7% of the population), people of mixed ethnic backgrounds or mulattos (43.1%), people entirely of African ancestry (7.6%), those with Asian ancestry (1.1%) and indigenous (0.4%).

=== Iberian Union ===
Territorial evolution of Brazil

In 1578, the young King Sebastian, King of Portugal disappeared in a crusade in Morocco, during the Battle of Alcácer Quibir. The king had entered the war without much allied support or the necessary resources to fight properly. Since he had no direct heirs, Philip II of Spain, who was his uncle (and whose grandfather was the Portuguese King Manuel I of Portugal), was the only successor and took control of the Portuguese administration in 1580. The 60 years of his rule is called the Iberian Union, in reference to the Iberian peninsula on which Spain and Portugal are located. It ended in 1640 when John IV of Portugal, Duke of Braganza, restored Portuguese independence and formed the 3rd Portuguese Royal Dynasty, the House of Braganza.

With the merging of the crowns in the Iberian Union, Portuguese/Brazilian settlers were legally allowed to cross beyond the Treaty of Tordesillas line, and thus more interior expansions of Brazil began or were at least officialized and mapped during that period. Sebastian never returned which originated the messianic line of thought Sebastianism, which asserted that the rightful King would return from the mists and restore the Kingdom to its former glory. In Brazil the most important manifestation of Sebastianism was the Proclamation of the Republic, when movements defending a return to the monarchy emerged.

It is one of the longest-lived millenarian legends in Western Europe, and had profound political and cultural resonances from the time of Sebastian's death until at least the late 19th century in Brazil.

=== Indigenous rebellions ===
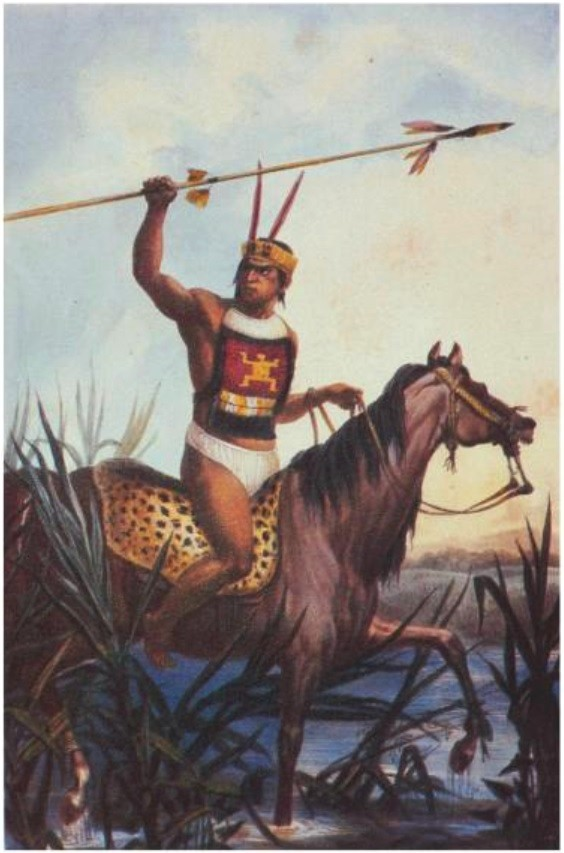
A Charrua warrior depicted by Jean-Baptiste Debret in the early 19th century

The Tamoyo Confederation (Confederação dos Tamoios in the Portuguese language) was a military alliance of aboriginal chieftains of the sea coast ranging from what is today Santos to Rio de Janeiro, that lasted from 1554 to 1567.

The main reason for this rather unusual alliance between separate tribes was the need for collective defense against the Portuguese settlers. In the Tupi language, "Tamuya" means 'elder' or 'grandfather'. Cunhambebe was elected chief of the Confederation by his counterparts, and together with chiefs Pindobuçú, Koakira, Araraí and Aimberê, declared war on the Portuguese.

=== Sugar age ===
Starting in the sixteenth century, sugarcane grown on plantations called engenhos (Note: enhengo is Portuguese for sugar mill, but came to refer also to the entire estate and plantation surrounding it) along the northeast coast (Brazil's Nordeste) became the base of the Brazilian economy and social structure. Large plantations used slave labor to produce sugar for export to Europe. At first, settlers tried to enslave the natives for these sugar plantations but soon switched to importing slaves from Africa. Portugal pioneered the plantation system in the Atlantic islands of Madeira and São Tomé, with forced labor, high capital inputs for machinery, slaves, and work animals. By 1570, Brazil's sugar output rivalled that of the Atlantic islands. In the mid-seventeenth century, the Dutch seized productive areas of northeast Brazil and took over the plantations. When the Dutch were expelled from Brazil, following a strong push by Portuguese-Brazilians and their indigenous and Afro-Brazilian allies, the Dutch as well as the English and French set up sugar production on the plantation model of Brazil in the Caribbean. Increased production and competition meant that the price of sugar dropped and Brazil's market share along with it. Brazil's recovery from the Dutch incursion was slow since warfare had damaged much of the land and infrastructure used for the plantations. In Bahia, tobacco was cultivated for the African export market, with tobacco dipped in molasses (derived from sugar production) being traded for African slaves. Brazil's settlement and economic development was focused on its lengthy coastline. The Dutch incursion had underlined the vulnerability of Brazil to foreigners, and Portugal responded by building coastal forts and creating a marine patrol to protect the colony.

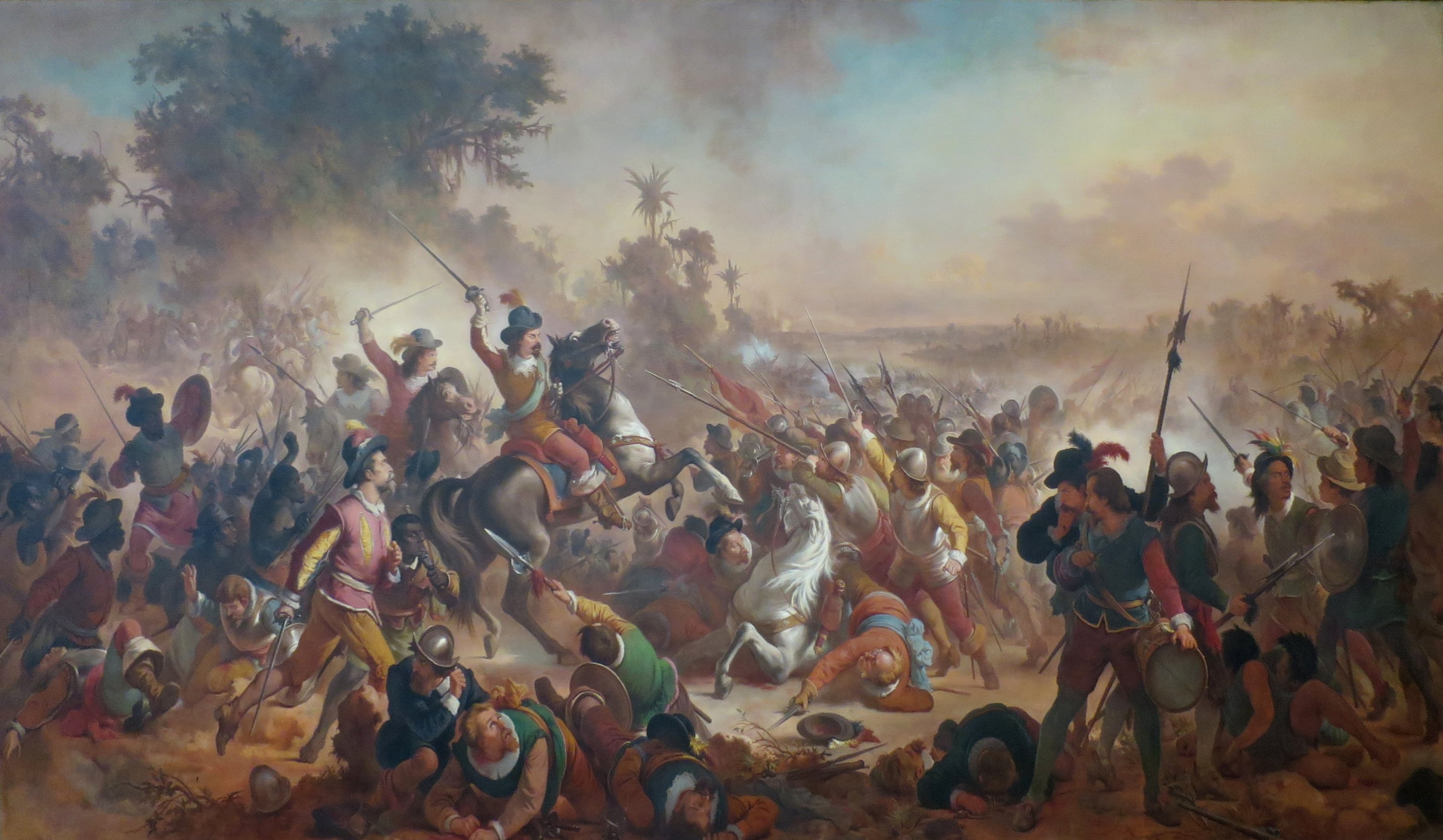
The Portuguese victory at the Battle of Guararapes ended Dutch presence in Brazil.

The initial exploration of Brazil's interior was largely due to para-military adventurers, the bandeirantes, who entered the jungle in search of gold and native slaves. However colonists were unable to continually enslave natives, and Portuguese sugar planters soon turned to import millions of slaves from Africa. Mortality rates for slaves in sugar and gold enterprises were dramatic, and there were often not enough women or proper conditions for the slave population to increase through reproduction, forced or otherwise.

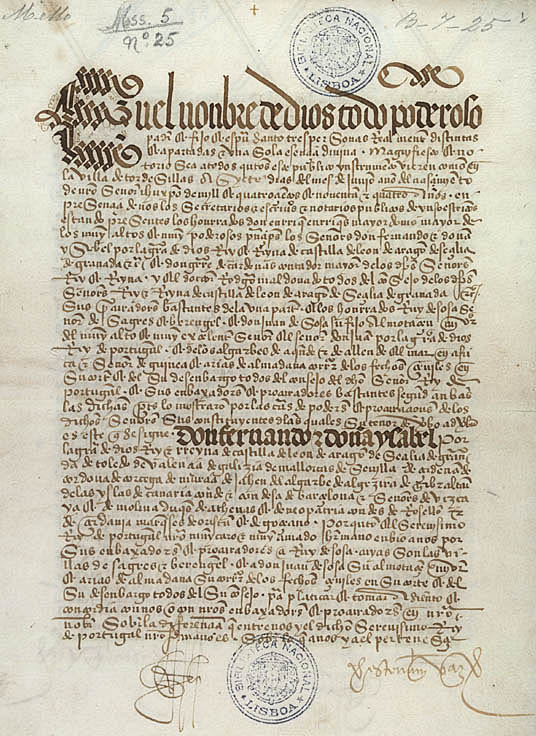
The Treaty of Tordesillas (1494), signed between Spain and Portugal to distribute the lands discovered and "to be discovered", defined the course of the history of the "future" Brazil.

(Note: Some slaves escaped from the plantations and tried to establish independent settlements (quilombos) in remote areas. The most important of these, the quilombo of Palmares, was the largest runaway slave settlement in the Americas and was a consolidated kingdom of some 30,000 people at its height in the 1670s and 80s. However, these settlements were mostly destroyed by the crown and private troops, which in some cases required long sieges and the use of artillery.) Still, Africans became a substantial section of the Brazilian population, and long before the end of slavery (1888) they had begun to merge with the European Brazilian population through intermarriage.

During the first 150 years of the colonial period, attracted by the vast natural resources and untapped land, other European powers tried to establish colonies in several parts of Brazilian territory, in defiance of the papal bull (Inter caetera) and the Treaty of Tordesillas. French colonists tried to settle in present-day Rio de Janeiro, from 1555 to 1567 (the so-called France Antarctique episode), and in present-day São Luís, from 1612 to 1614 (the so-called France Équinoxiale). Jesuits arrived early and established São Paulo, and began evangelizing the natives. These native allies of the Jesuits assisted the Portuguese in driving out the French. The unsuccessful Dutch intrusion into Brazil was longer lasting and more troublesome to Portugal (Dutch Brazil). Dutch privateers began by plundering the coast: they sacked Bahia in 1604, and even temporarily captured the capital Salvador. From 1630 to 1654, the Dutch set up more permanently in the northwest and controlled a long stretch of the coast most accessible to Europe, without, however, penetrating the interior. But the colonists of the Dutch West India Company in Brazil were in a constant state of siege, despite the presence in Recife of John Maurice of Nassau as governor. After several years of open warfare, the Dutch withdrew by 1654. Little French and Dutch cultural and ethnic influences remained from these failed attempts and the Portuguese subsequently defended the Brazilian coastline more vigorously.

=== Slave rebellions ===
Slavery in Brazil
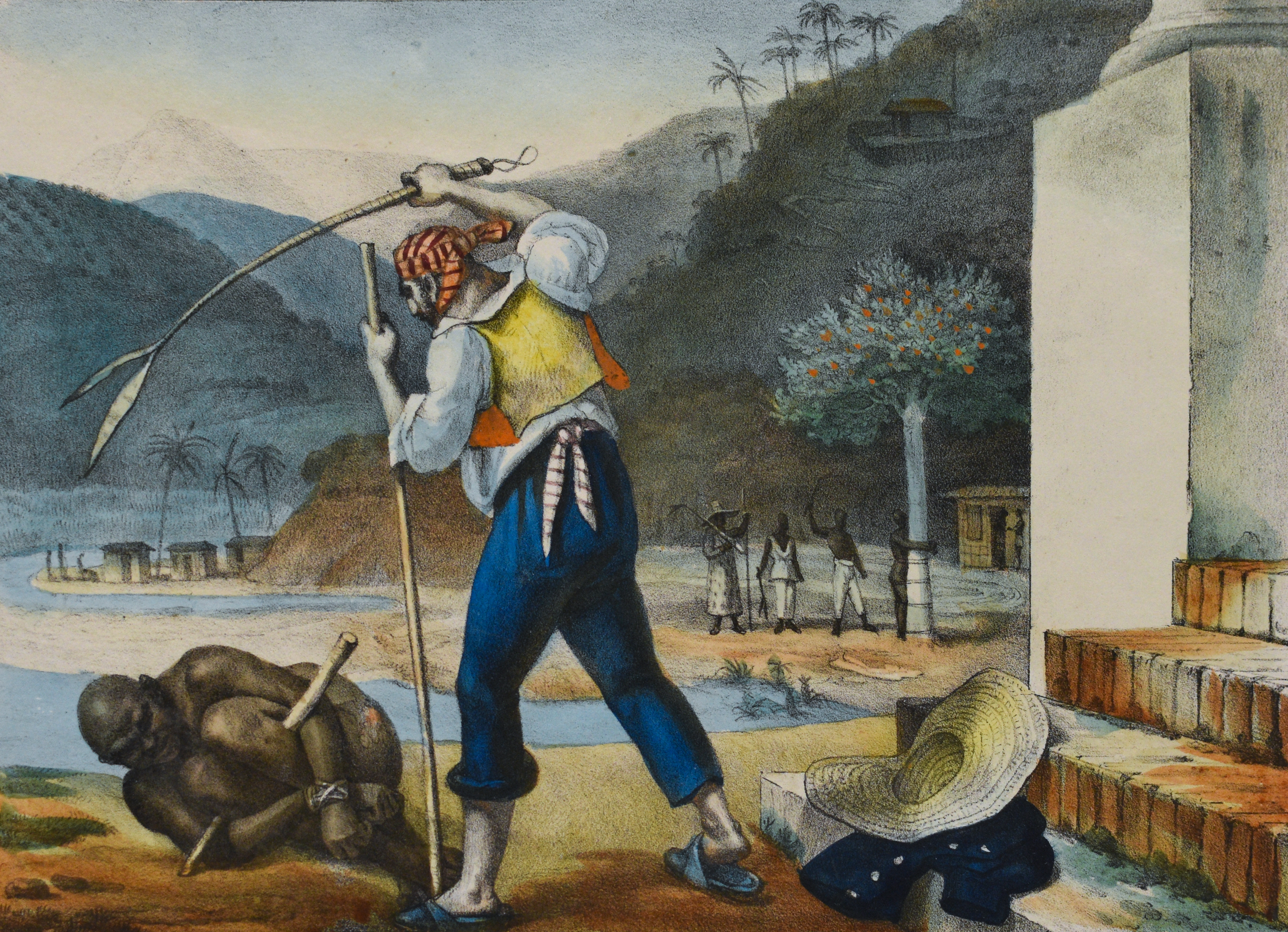
Slavery in Brazil by Jean-Baptiste Debret. A slave owner punishes a slave in Brazil.

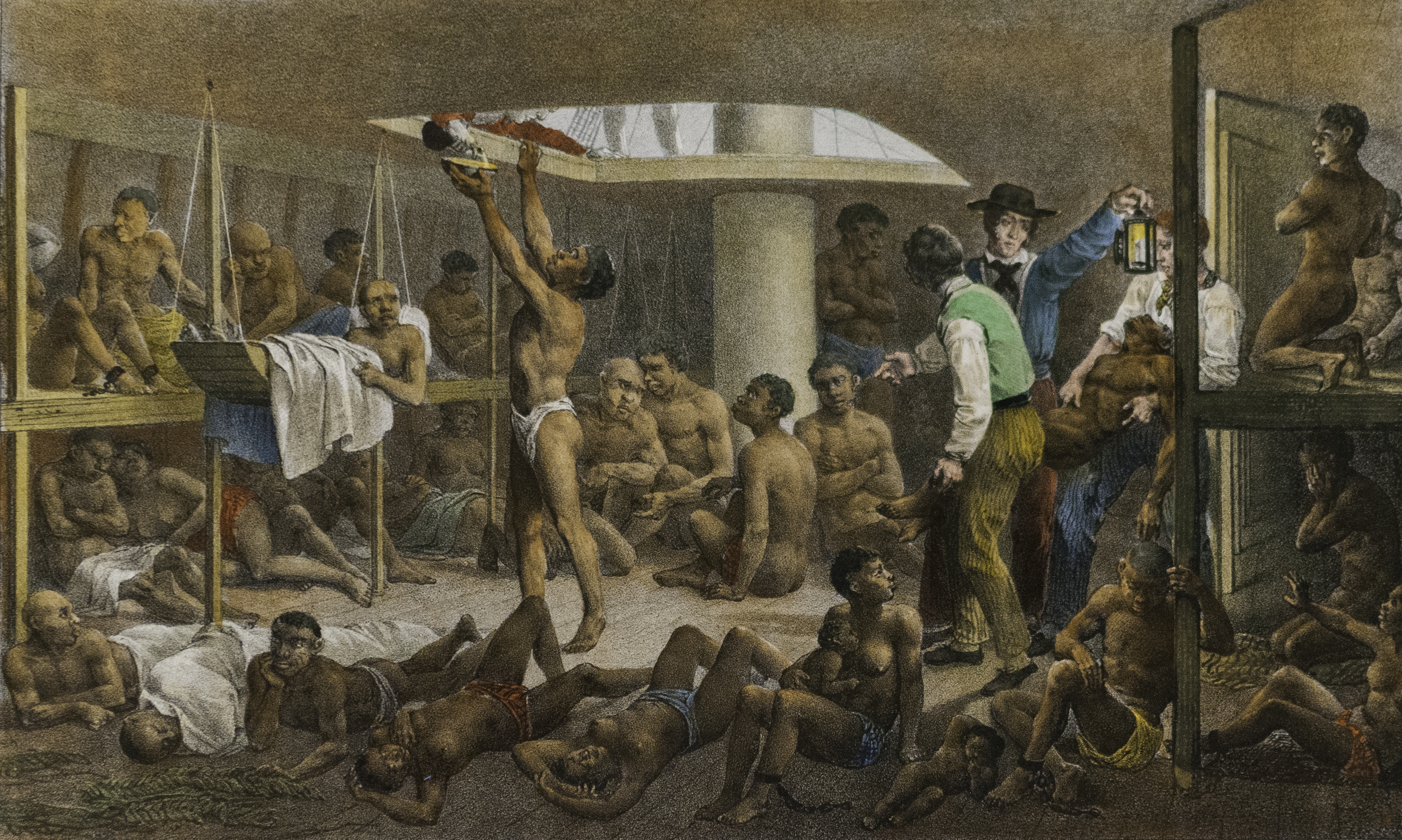
This painting by Johann Moritz Rugendas depicts a scene below the deck of a slave ship headed to Brazil. Rugendas was an eyewitness to the scene.

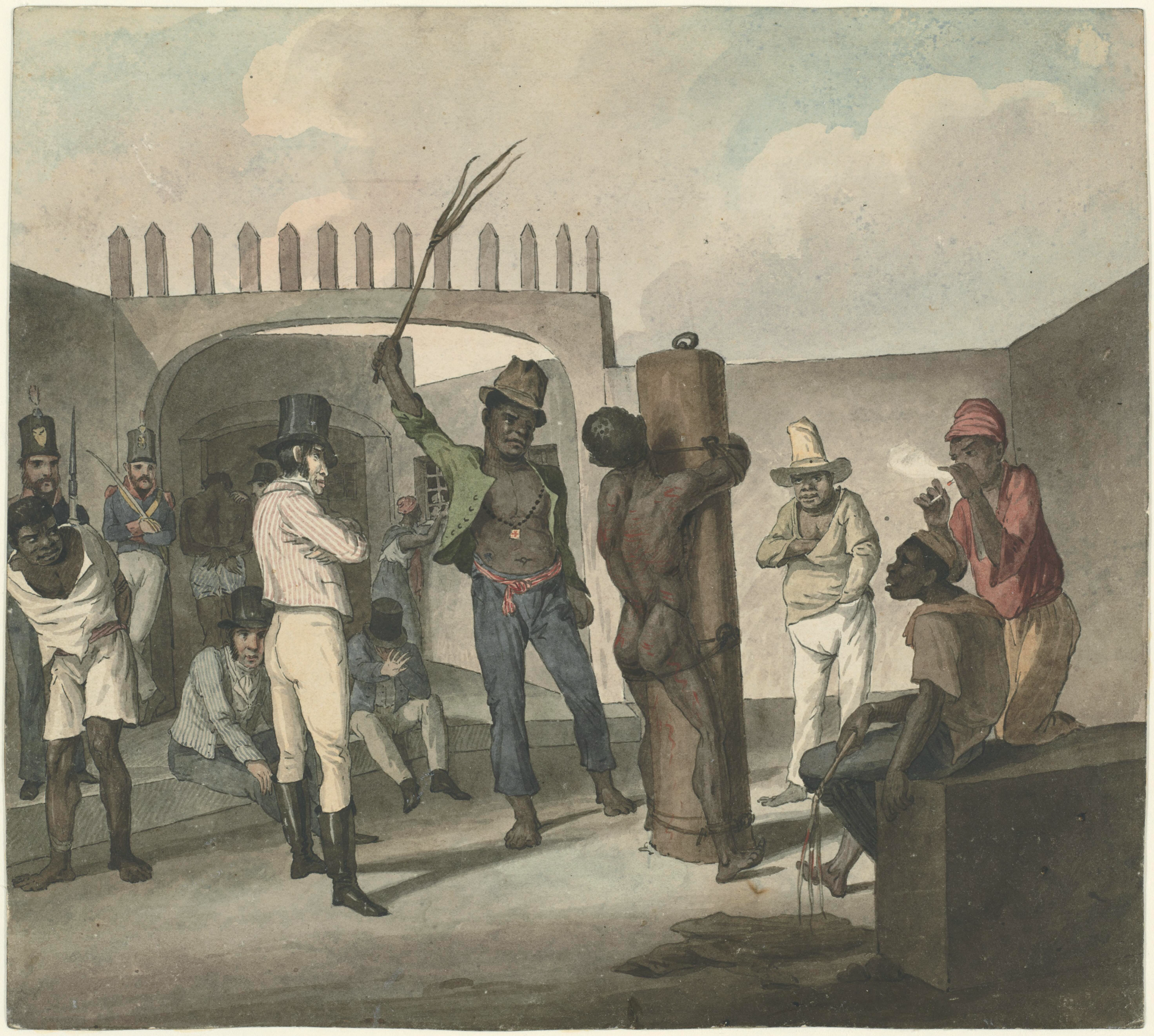
Punishing slaves at Cathabouco, [i.e. Calabouço] in Rio de Janeiro, by Augustus Earle, c. 1822

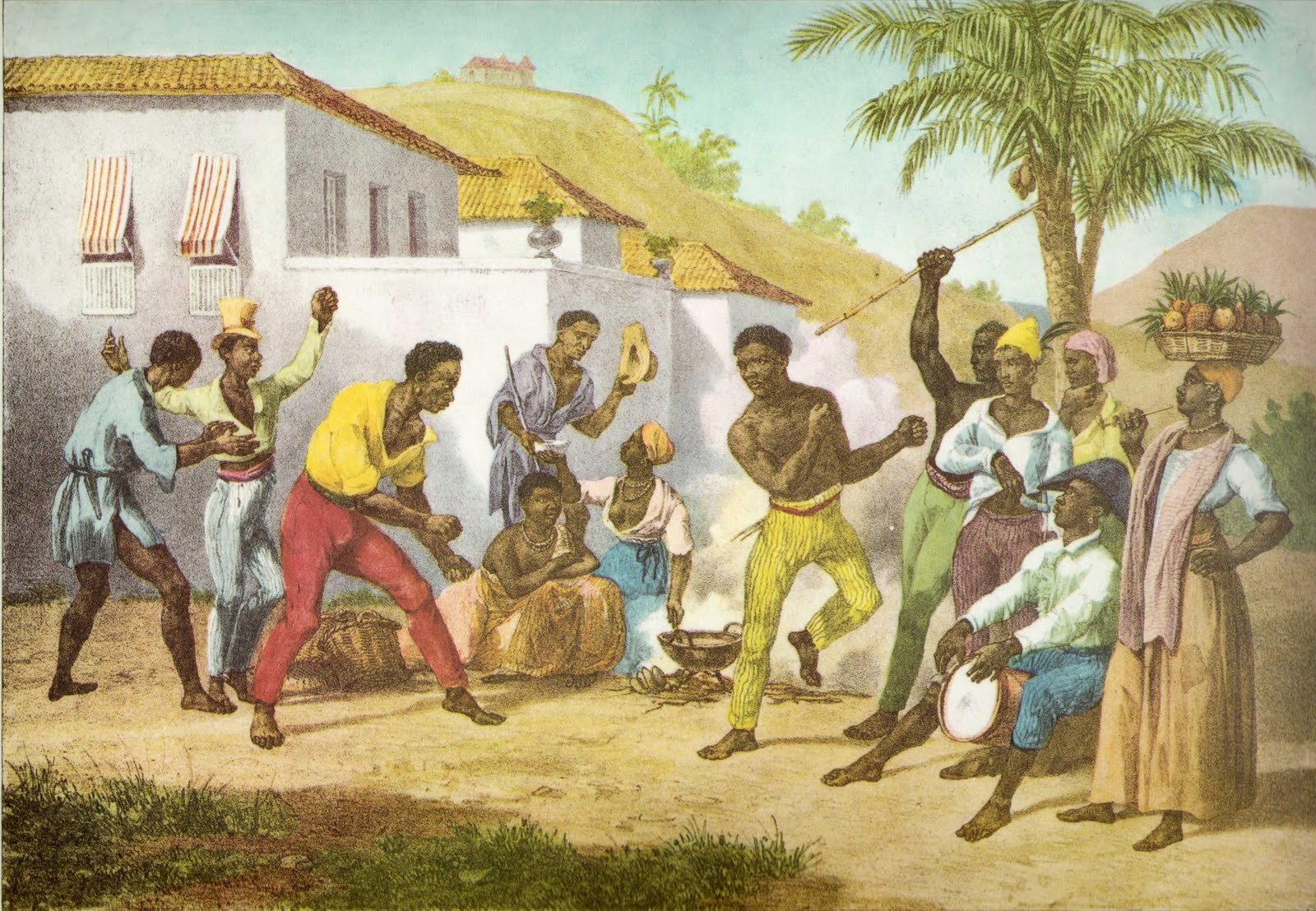
Capoeira or the Dance of War by Johann Moritz Rugendas, 1835

Slave rebellions were frequent until the practice of slavery was abolished in 1888. The most famous of the revolts was led by Zumbi dos Palmares. The state he established, named the Quilombo dos Palmares, was a self-sustaining republic of Maroons escaped from the Portuguese settlements in Brazil, and was "a region perhaps the size of Portugal in the hinterland of Pernambuco". At its height, Palmares had a population of over 30,000.

Forced to defend against repeated attacks by Portuguese colonial power, the warriors of Palmares were experts in capoeira, a martial arts form developed in Brazil by African slaves in the 16th century.

An African known only as Zumbi was born free in Palmares in 1655 but was captured by the Portuguese and given to a missionary, Father Antônio Melo when he was approximately 6 years old. Baptized Francisco, Zumbi was taught the sacraments, learned Portuguese and Latin, and helped with daily mass. Despite attempts to "civilize" him, Zumbi escaped in 1670 and, at the age of 15, returned to his birthplace. Zumbi became known for his physical prowess and cunning in battle and was a respected military strategist by the time he was in his early twenties.

By 1678, the governor of the captaincy of Pernambuco, Pedro Almeida, weary of the longstanding conflict with Palmares, approached its leader Ganga Zumba with a peace offering. Almeida offered freedom for all runaway slaves if Palmares would submit to Portuguese authority, a proposal which Ganga Zumba favoured. But Zumbi was distrustful of the Portuguese. Further, he refused to accept freedom for the people of Palmares while other Africans remained enslaved. He rejected Almeida's overture and challenged Ganga Zumba's leadership. Vowing to continue the resistance to Portuguese oppression, Zumbi became the new leader of Palmares.

Fifteen years after Zumbi assumed leadership of Palmares, Portuguese military commanders Domingos Jorge Velho and Vieira de Melo mounted an artillery assault on the quilombo. On February 6, 1694, after 67 years of ceaseless conflict with the cafuzos (Maroons) of Palmares, the Portuguese succeeded in destroying Cerca do Macaco, the republic's central settlement. Palmares' warriors were no match for the Portuguese artillery; the republic fell, and Zumbi was wounded. Though he survived and managed to elude the Portuguese, he was betrayed, captured almost two years later and beheaded on the spot on November 20, 1695. The Portuguese transported Zumbi's head to Recife, where it was displayed in the central praça as proof that, contrary to popular legend among African slaves, Zumbi was not immortal. It was also done as a warning of what would happen to others who attempted rebellion.

=== Gold and diamond rush ===
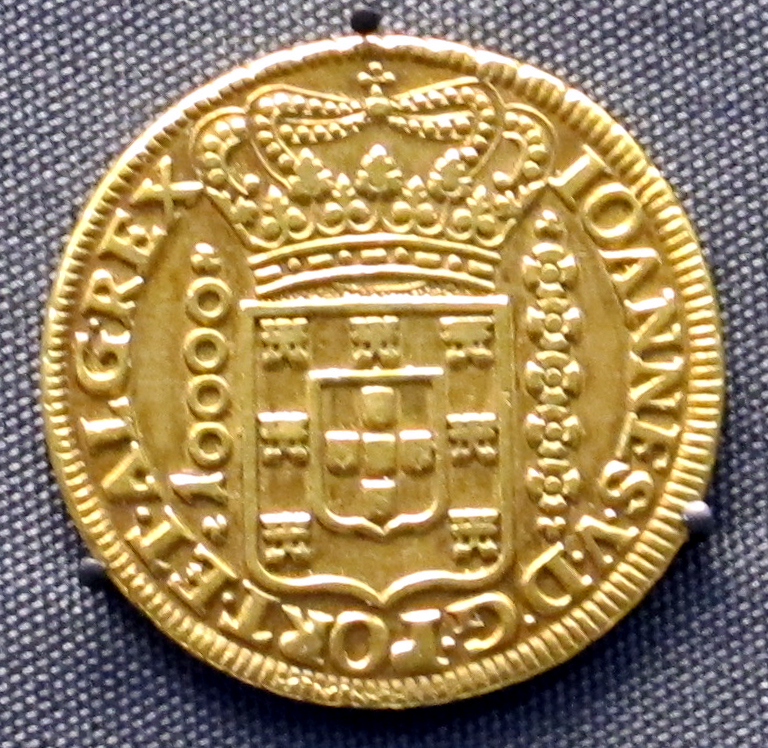
Portuguese colonial Brazil gold coin from the southeastern Brazilian state of Minas Gerais

The discovery of gold in the early eighteenth century was met with great enthusiasm by Portugal, which had been in economic disarray following years of wars against Spain and the Netherlands. A gold rush quickly ensued, with people from other parts of the colony and Portugal flooding the region in the first half of the eighteenth century. The large portion of the Brazilian inland where gold was extracted became known as the Minas Gerais (General Mines). Gold mining in this area became the main economic activity of colonial Brazil during the eighteenth century. In Portugal, the gold was mainly used to pay for industrialized goods (textiles, weapons) obtained from countries such as England and, especially during the reign of King John V, to build Baroque monuments such as the Convent of Mafra. In Brasil it resulted in the emergence of towns and cities that are today UNESCO World Heritage Sites such as Ouro Preto, one of the largest and most populous towns in the Americas during that period, and many other historical towns with significant architecture: Paraty, Olinda, Congonhas, Goiás, Diamantina, Salvador, São Luís, Maranhão, São Francisco Square, Cathedral Basilica of Salvador and Rio de Janeiro.

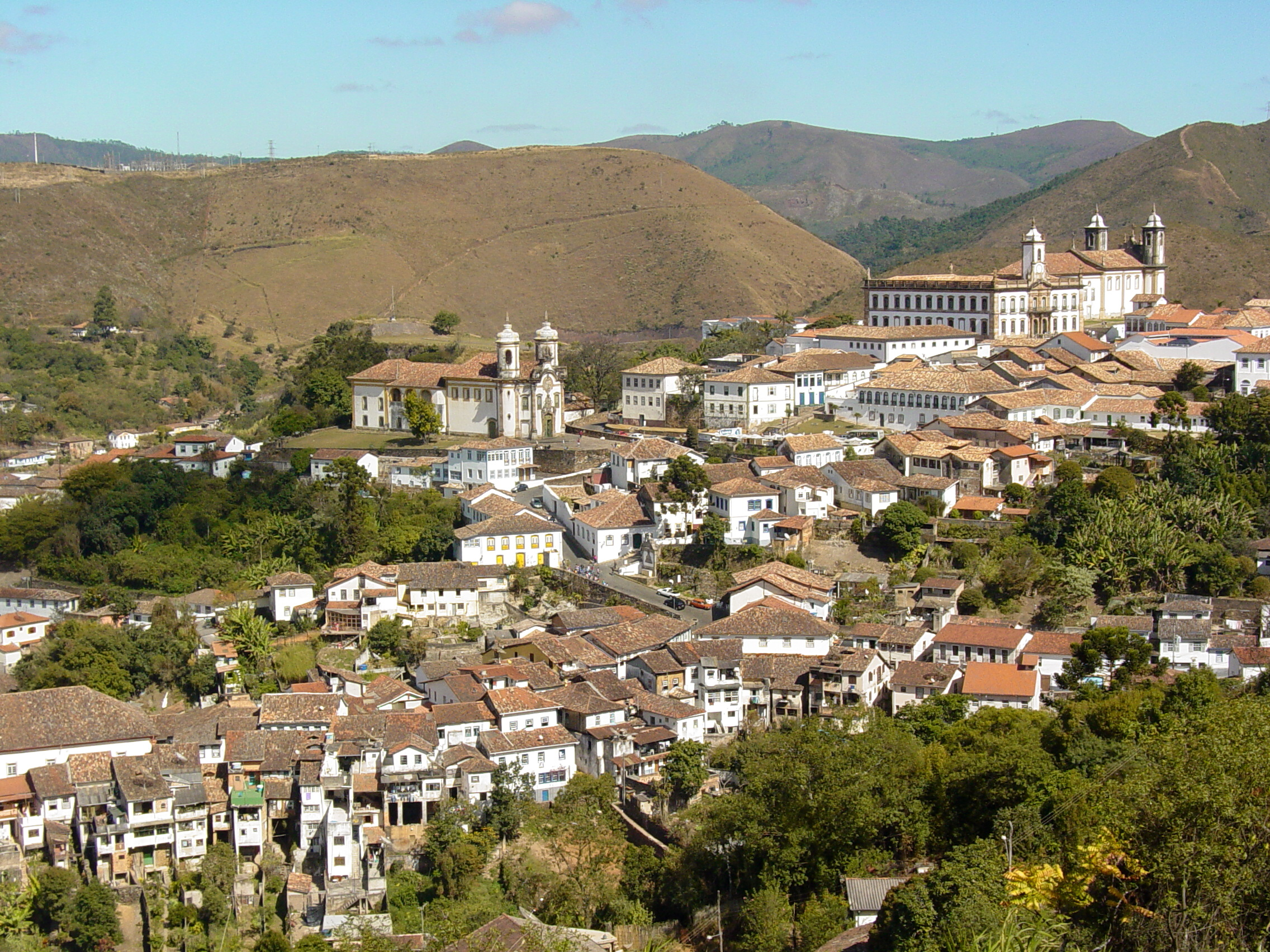
Ouro Preto is the jewel in the crown of Minas Gerais's colonial towns. It was Brazil's wealthiest city during the 18th-century gold boom. Besides being an open-air museum, Ouro Preto is also a major university town, with a youthful and vibrant ambience.

Minas Gerais was the gold mining centre of Brazil, during the 18th century. Slave labour was generally used for the workforce. The discovery of gold in the area caused a huge influx of European immigrants and the government decided to bring in bureaucrats from Portugal to control operations. They set up numerous bureaucracies, often with conflicting duties and jurisdictions. The officials generally proved unequal to the task of controlling this highly lucrative industry. Following Brazilian independence, the British pursued extensive economic activity in Brazil. In 1830, the Saint John d'El Rey Mining Company, controlled by the British, opened the largest gold mine in Latin America. The British brought in modern management techniques and engineering expertise. Located in Nova Lima, the mine produced ore for 125 years.

Diamond deposits were found near Vila do Príncipe, around the village of Tijuco in the 1720s, and a rush to extract the precious stones ensued, flooding the European market. The Portuguese crown intervened to control production in Diamantina, the Diamond District. A system of bids for the right to extract diamonds was established, but in 1771, it was abolished and the crown retained the monopoly.

Mining stimulated regional growth in southern Brazil, not just from the extraction of gold and diamonds, but also the secondary and tertiary industries that arose to support the central mining operations. More importantly, it stimulated commerce and the development of merchant communities in port cities. Nominally, the Portuguese controlled the trade to Brazil, banning the establishment of productive capacity for goods produced in Portugal. In practice, Portugal was an entrepôt for the import and export of goods from elsewhere, which were then re-exported to Brazil. Direct trade with foreign nations was forbidden, but before the Dutch incursion, much of Brazil's exports were carried in Dutch ships. After the American Revolution, U.S. ships called at Brazilian ports. When the Portuguese monarchy fled Iberia to Brazil in 1808 during the Napoleonic wars, one of the first acts of the monarch was to open Brazilian ports to foreign ships.

== Kingdom and Empire of Brazil ==
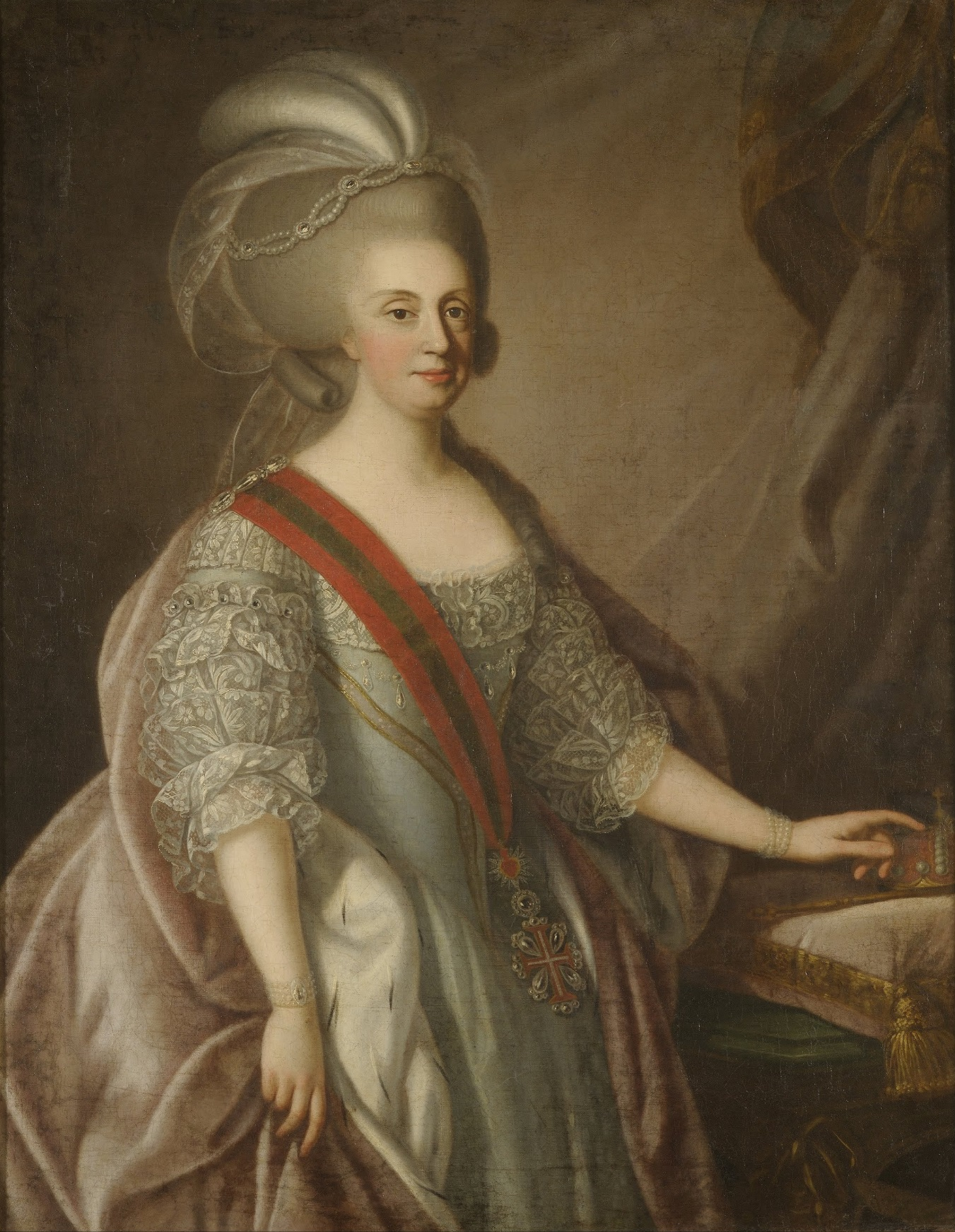
Queen Maria I of the United Kingdom of Portugal, Brazil and the Algarves

Brazil was one of only three modern states in the Americas to have a monarchy—the other two being Mexico and Haiti—for almost 90 years.

As the Haitian Revolution for independence against the French crown was taking place in the late 1700s, Brazil, then a colony of Portugal, was also on the verge of starting its own revolution for independence. On 5 January 1785, Maria I of Portugal issued a charter imposing heavy restrictions on industrial activity in Brazil. For example, it prohibited the manufacture of fabrics and other products, extinguishing all textile manufactures in the colony, except the industry of coarse cloth for the use of slaves and workers. The Portuguese colonial administration did not look favorably on the development of industrial activities in Brazil for fear of economic and, perhaps, political independence.

In the early 1790s, plots to overthrow the Portuguese colonial government flooded the streets of Brazil. Poor whites, a few upper-class whites, freed persons, slaves and mixed-race natives wanted to revolt against the Portuguese crown to abolish slavery, take power from the Catholic Church, end all forms of racial oppression, and establish a new governmental system that provided equal opportunities to all citizens.

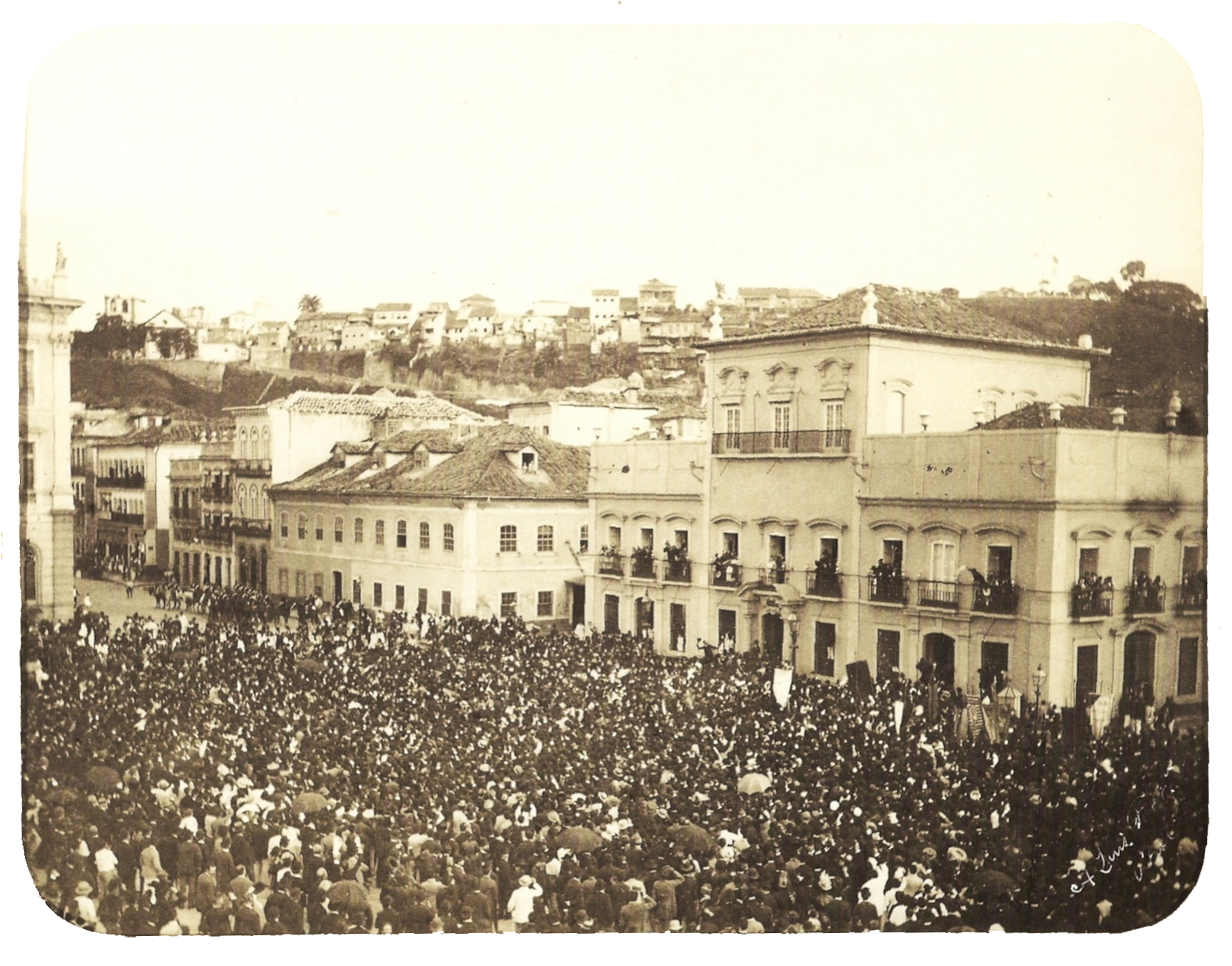
A few moments after signing the Golden Law, Princess Isabel is greeted from the central balcony of the City Palace by a huge crowd below in the street.

Though original plots had been foiled by royal authorities, Brazilians remained persistent in forming plots for revolutions after an outbreak of successful independence movements. The plan was similar to that of the French Revolutions, which by this period had established the revolutionary blueprint for much of the colonial world. However, the harsh punishment inflicted upon poor whites, working people of colour, and slaves had silenced many voices of the revolution. As for the white elites, while some remained influenced by the revolutionary ideals spreading through France, others saw the incredible and intimidating strength of the lower classes through the Haitian Revolution and feared that an uprising from their own lower class may lead to something equally as catastrophic to their society.

In 1808, the Portuguese court, fleeing from Napoleon's invasion of Portugal during the Peninsular War in a large fleet escorted by British men-of-war, moved the government apparatus to its then-colony, Brazil, establishing themselves in the city of Rio de Janeiro. From there the Portuguese king, John VI, ruled his empire for 15 years, and there he would have remained for the rest of his life if it were not for the turmoil aroused in Portugal due, among other reasons, to his long stay in Brazil after the end of Napoleon's reign.

United Kingdom of Portugal, Brazil and the Algarves (1816–1821)

Flag of the Empire of Brazil (October 12, 1822 – November 15, 1889)

In 1815, the king vested Brazil with the dignity of a united kingdom with Portugal and the Algarves. In 1817 a revolt occurred in the province of Pernambuco. In two months it was suppressed.

When king João VI of Portugal left Brazil to return to Portugal in 1821, his elder son, Pedro, stayed in his stead as regent of Brazil. One year later, Pedro stated the reasons for the secession of Brazil from Portugal and led the War of Independence, instituted a constitutional monarchy in Brazil assuming its head as Emperor Pedro I of Brazil, and then returned to Portugal to fight for a constitutional monarchy and against his absolutist usurper brother Miguel I of Portugal in the Liberal Wars. Brazil's independence was recognized with the Treaty of Rio de Janeiro in 1825.

Brazil's territorial dimensions as a nation were largely established before independence by the Portuguese-Brazilian monarchy (House of Bragança) in 1822, with later some territorial expansion and disputes with neighboring Spanish ex-colonies. Today Brazil is the largest contiguous territory in the Americas.

Pedro I (IV of Portugal) abdicated the Brazilian throne in 1831 due to political turmoil (he was disliked by both the landed elites, who thought him too liberal, and by the intellectuals, who felt he was not liberal enough), and left for Portugal to defend his daughter Maria II of Portugal's claim to the Portuguese throne and establish a constitutional monarchy in Portugal, leaving his five-year-old son Pedro II of Brazil, whose mother was Maria Leopoldina of Austria, as Emperor of Brazil. During his childhood, the country was under the regency of Pedro's guardian José Bonifácio de Andrade e Silva, who governed from 1831 to 1840 (see Early life of Pedro II of Brazil). This period was beset by rebellions of various motivations, such as the Sabinada, the Ragamuffin War, the Malê Revolt, the Cabanagem, and the Balaiada, among others. This period ended when Pedro II was crowned at 14 years old and assumed his full prerogatives with dedication. Pedro II started a parliamentary monarchy which lasted almost 50 years, during which Brazil developed considerably.

Brazil's imperial flag introduced the green background with a yellow diamond, representing the colours of the House of Braganza and the House of Habsburg-Lorraine respectively, and maintained the Portuguese armillary sphere motif and the blue and white colours of Portugal with the Cross within the sphere. The republican flag maintained the armillary sphere motif in the form of a blue globe, crossed with a white stripe and dotted with white stars representing each Brazilian state and forming the Southern Cross constellation within the globe. The green and yellow also became associated with the lush forests and mineral wealth of Brazil.

Brazil also dealt with external conflict during this time. They were under pressure from Great Britain to end their participation in the Atlantic slave trade. They were also engaged in a number of wars fought in the region of La Plata river: the Cisplatine War (in the second half of the 1820s), the Platine War (in the 1850s), the Uruguayan War, and the Paraguayan War (in the 1860s). This last war against Paraguay also was the bloodiest and most expensive in South American history.

=== Coffee plantations ===
The coffee crop was introduced in 1720, and by 1850 Brazil was producing half of the world's coffee. The state set up a marketing board to protect and encourage the industry.

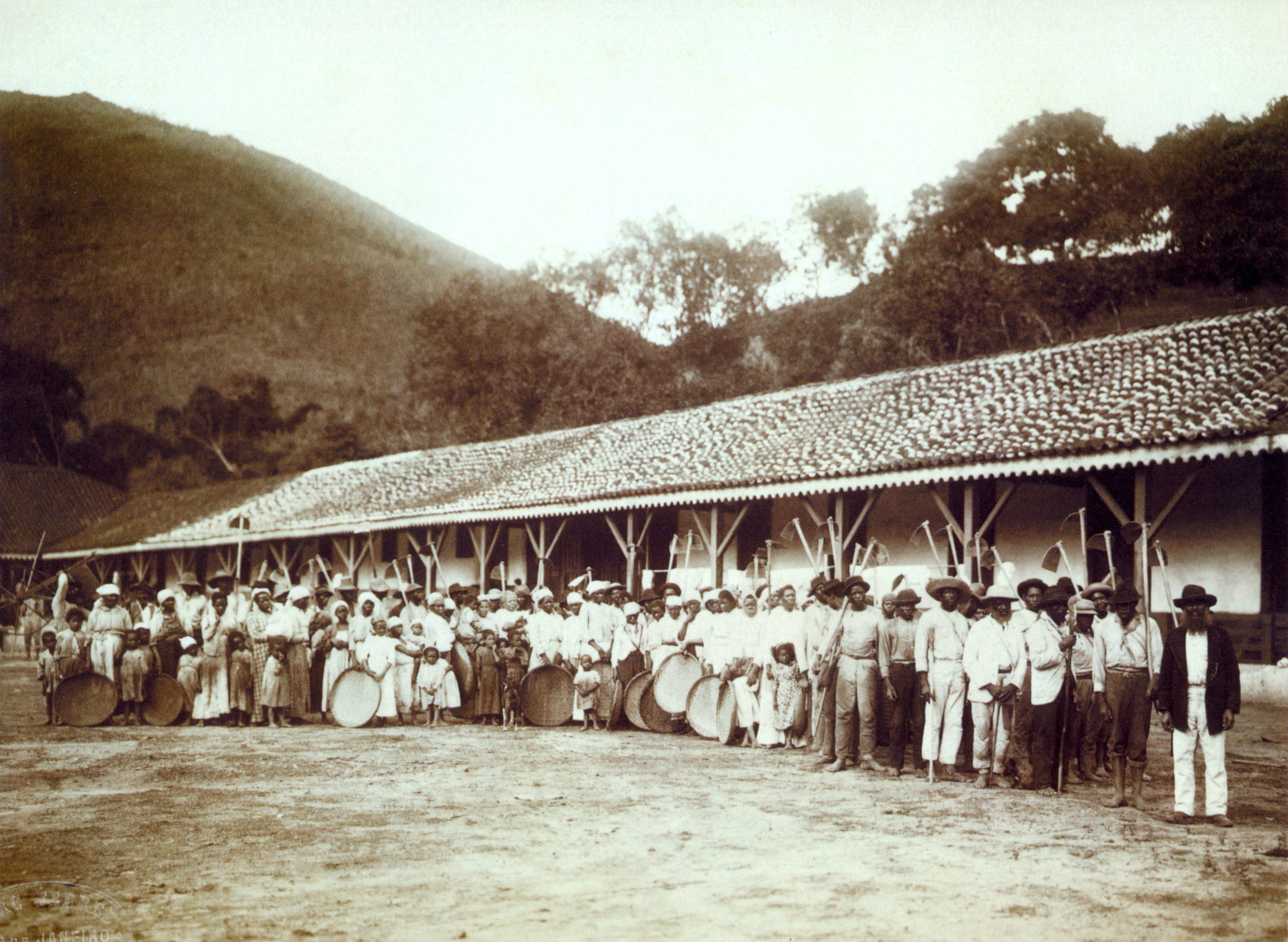
Slaves on a fazenda (coffee farm), c. 1885

Coffee was Brazil's major export crop during the 1800s. It was grown on large-scale plantations in the São Paulo area. The Zona da Mata Mineira district grew 90% of the coffee in the Minas Gerais region during the 1880s and 70% during the 1920s. Most of the workers were black men, including both slaves and free men but an increasing number were Italian, Spanish and Japanese immigrants. While railway lines were built to haul the coffee beans to market, they also provided essential internal transportation for both freight and passengers, as well as providing work opportunities for a large skilled labour force. By the early 20th century, coffee accounted for 16% of Brazil's gross national product, and three-quarters of its export earnings.

The growers and exporters played major roles in politics; however, historians debate whether or not they were the most powerful actors in the political system.

Before the 1960s, historians generally ignored the coffee industry. Coffee was not a major industry in the colonial period. In any one particular locality, the coffee industry flourished for a few decades and then moved on as the soil lost its fertility; therefore it was not deeply embedded in the history of any one locality. After independence, coffee plantations were associated with slavery, underdevelopment, and a political oligarchy, and not the modern development of state and society. Historians now recognize the importance of the industry, and there is a flourishing scholarly literature.

=== Rubber ===
The rubber boom in the Amazon in the 1880s–1910s radically reshaped the Amazonian economy. For example, the remote jungle village of Manaus became a large and wealthy city. The rubber boom had other major long-term effects: much of the land became controlled by large land and plantation owners; trading networks were built throughout the Amazon basin; barter became a major form of exchange; and native peoples often were displaced. The boom firmly established the influence of the state throughout the region. The boom ended abruptly in the 1920s, and income levels in these areas returned to those of the 1870s. There were also major negative effects on the fragile Amazonian environment.

=== Sugar ===
For centuries sugar was a key aspect of Portugal's economy as the America's main export to Europe. By the early 1500s the Portuguese had transported over 5 million slaves to Brazil to work on sugar plantations. Life expectancies of slaves varied throughout the hundreds of years of the transatlantic slave trade, but they were considerably lower than Europeans and freed blacks. Northern Brazil became one of the main exporters of sugar along with Cuba.

== Republics ==
=== First Republic (1889–1930) ===
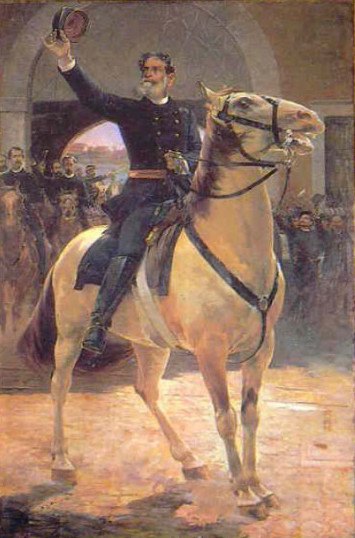
Henrique Bernardelli: Marechal Deodoro da Fonseca, c. 1900

Pedro II was deposed on November 15, 1889, by a Republican military coup led by General Deodoro da Fonseca, who became the country's first de facto president through military ascension. The country's name became the Republic of the United States of Brazil (which in 1967 was changed to Federative Republic of Brazil). Two military presidents ruled through four years of dictatorship amid conflicts among the military and political elites (two Naval revolts, followed by a Federalist revolt), and an economic crisis due to the effects of the burst of a financial bubble, the encilhamento.

From 1889 to 1930, although the country was formally a constitutional democracy, the First Republican Constitution, created in 1891, established that women and the illiterate (then the majority of the population) were prevented from voting. Presidentialism was adopted as the form of government and the State was divided into three powers (Legislative, Executive and Judiciary) "harmonic and independent of one another". The presidential term was fixed at four years, and the elections became direct.

After 1894, the presidency of the republic was occupied by coffee farmers (oligarchies) from São Paulo and Minas Gerais, alternately. This policy was called política do café com leite ("coffee with milk" policy). The elections for president and governors were ruled by the Política dos Governadores (Governor's policy), in which they had mutual support to ensure the elections of some candidates. The exchanges of favours also happened among politicians and big landowners. They used the power to control the votes of the population in return for favors (this was called coronelismo).

Between 1893 and 1926 several movements, civilians and military, shook the country. The military movements had their origins both in the lower officers' corps of the Army and Navy (which, dissatisfied with the regime, called for democratic changes) while the civilian ones, such Canudos and Contestado War, were usually led by messianic leaders, without conventional political goals.

Internationally, the country would stick to a course of conduct that extended throughout the twentieth century: an almost isolationist policy, interspersed with sporadic automatic alignments with major Western powers, its main economic partners, in moments of high turbulence. Standing out of this period: the resolution of the question of Acre, its tiny role in the World War I, of which highlights the mission accomplished by its Navy on anti-submarine warfare, and an effort to play a leading role in the League of Nations.

=== Vargas Era (1930–1946) ===
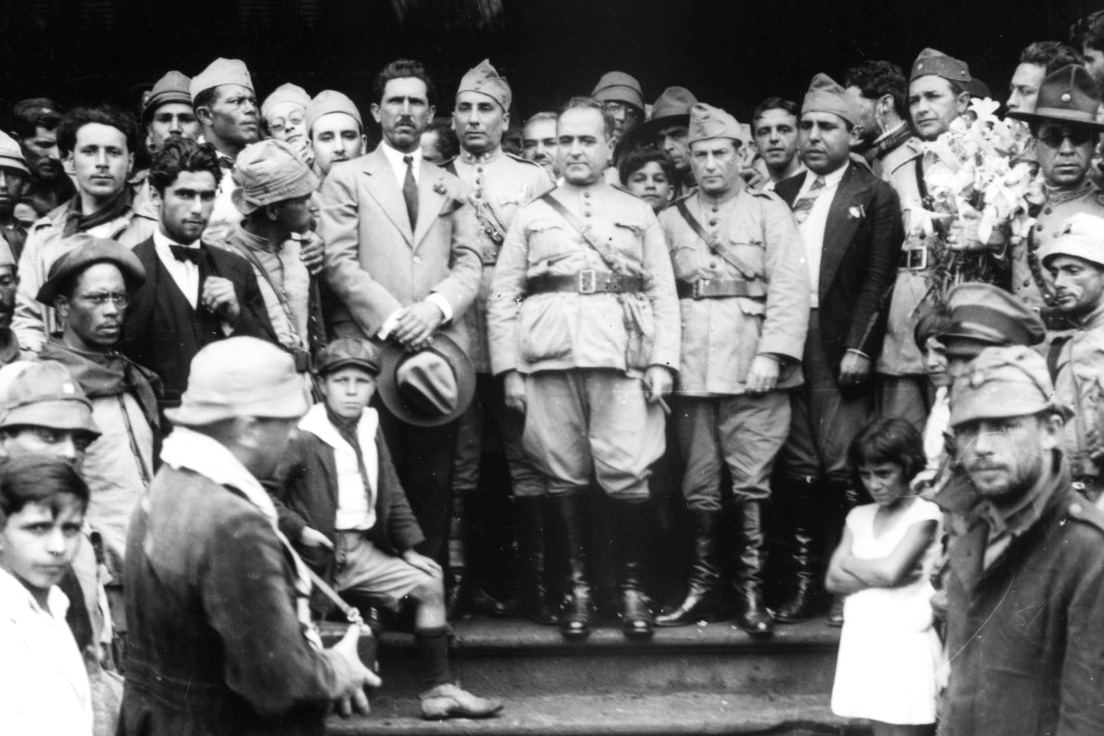
Getúlio Vargas after the 1930 revolution, which began the Vargas era

After 1930, the successive governments continued industrial and agriculture growth and development of the vast interior of Brazil. Getúlio Vargas led a military junta that had taken control in 1930 and would continue to rule from 1930 to 1945 with the backing of the Brazilian military, especially the Army. In this period, known as the Third Republic, Vargas faced internally the Constitutionalist Revolt in 1932 and two separate coup d'état attempts: by Communists in 1935 and by local right-wing elements of the Brazilian Integralism movement in 1938.

The liberal revolution of 1930 overthrew the oligarchic coffee plantation owners and brought to power an urban middle class and business interests that promoted industrialization and modernization. Aggressive promotion of new industry turned around the economy by 1933. Brazil's leaders in the 1920s and 1930s decided that Argentina's implicit foreign policy goal was to isolate Portuguese-speaking Brazil from Spanish-speaking neighbours, thus facilitating the expansion of Argentine economic and political influence in South America. Even worse, was the fear that a more powerful Argentine Army would launch a surprise attack on the weaker Brazilian Army. To counter this threat, President Getúlio Vargas forged closer links with the United States. Meanwhile, Argentina moved in the opposite direction. During World War II, Brazil was a staunch ally of the United States and sent its military to Europe. The United States provided over $100 million in Lend-Lease grants, in return for free rent on air bases used to transport American soldiers and supplies across the Atlantic, and naval bases for anti-submarine operations. In sharp contrast, Argentina was officially neutral and at times favoured Germany.

=== Fourth Republic ===
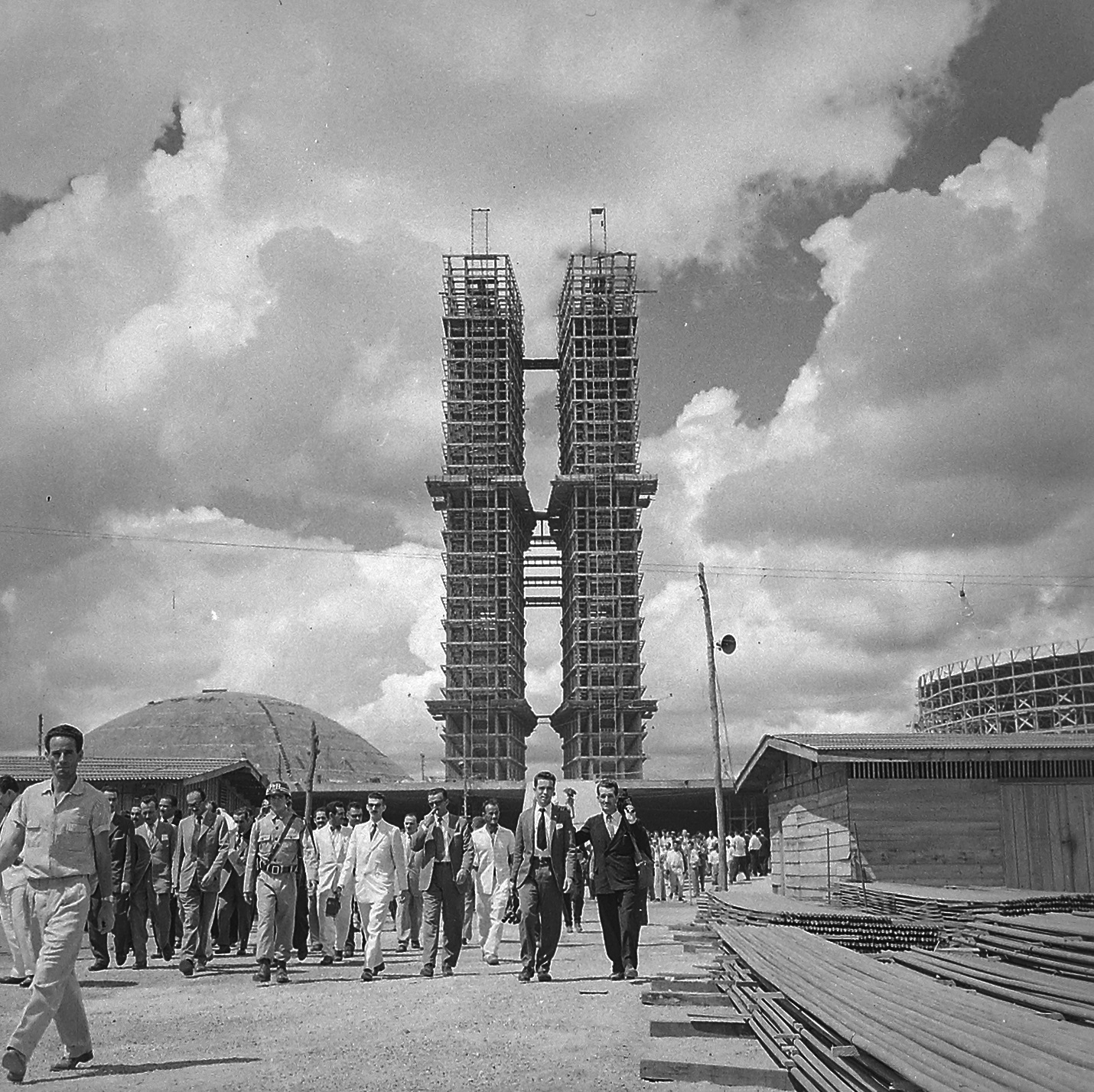
Headquarters of the National Congress of Brazil in 1959, during the construction of the new federal capital

A democratic regime prevailed from 1945 to 1964, in a period known as the Fourth Republic. In the 1950s after Vargas' second period (this time, democratically elected), the country experienced an economic boom during Juscelino Kubitschek's years, during which the capital was moved from Rio de Janeiro to Brasília.

Externally, after a relative isolation during the first half of the 1930s due to the effects of the 1929 Crisis, in the second half of the 1930s, there was a rapprochement with the fascist regimes of Italy and Germany. However, after the fascist coup attempt in 1938 and the naval blockade imposed on these two countries by the British navy from the beginning of World War II, in the decade of 1940 there was a return to the old foreign policy of the previous period.

During the early 1940s, Brazil joined the allied forces in the Battle of the Atlantic and the Italian Campaign; in the 1950s the country began its participation in the United Nations' peacekeeping missions with Suez Canal in 1956 and at the beginning of the 1960s, during the presidency of Janio Quadros, its first attempts to break the automatic alignment (that had started in the 1940s) with the US.

The institutional crisis of succession for the presidency, triggered by the Quadros' resignation, coupled with external pressure from the United States against a more nationalist government, would lead to the military intervention of 1964 and the end of this period.

=== Military dictatorship (1964–1985) ===
The Brazilian military government (also known as the United States of Brazil or Fifth Brazilian Republic) was the authoritarian military dictatorship that ruled Brazil from 1 April 1964 to 15 March 1985. It began with the 1964 coup d'état led by the Armed Forces against the administration of President João Goulart.

The coup was planned and executed by the commanders of the Brazilian Army and received the support of almost all high-ranking members of the military, along with conservative elements in society, such as the Catholic Church and anti-communist civil movements among the Brazilian middle and upper classes.

The State Department of the United States backed the coup through Operation Brother Sam and supported the dictatorship through its embassy in Brasília.

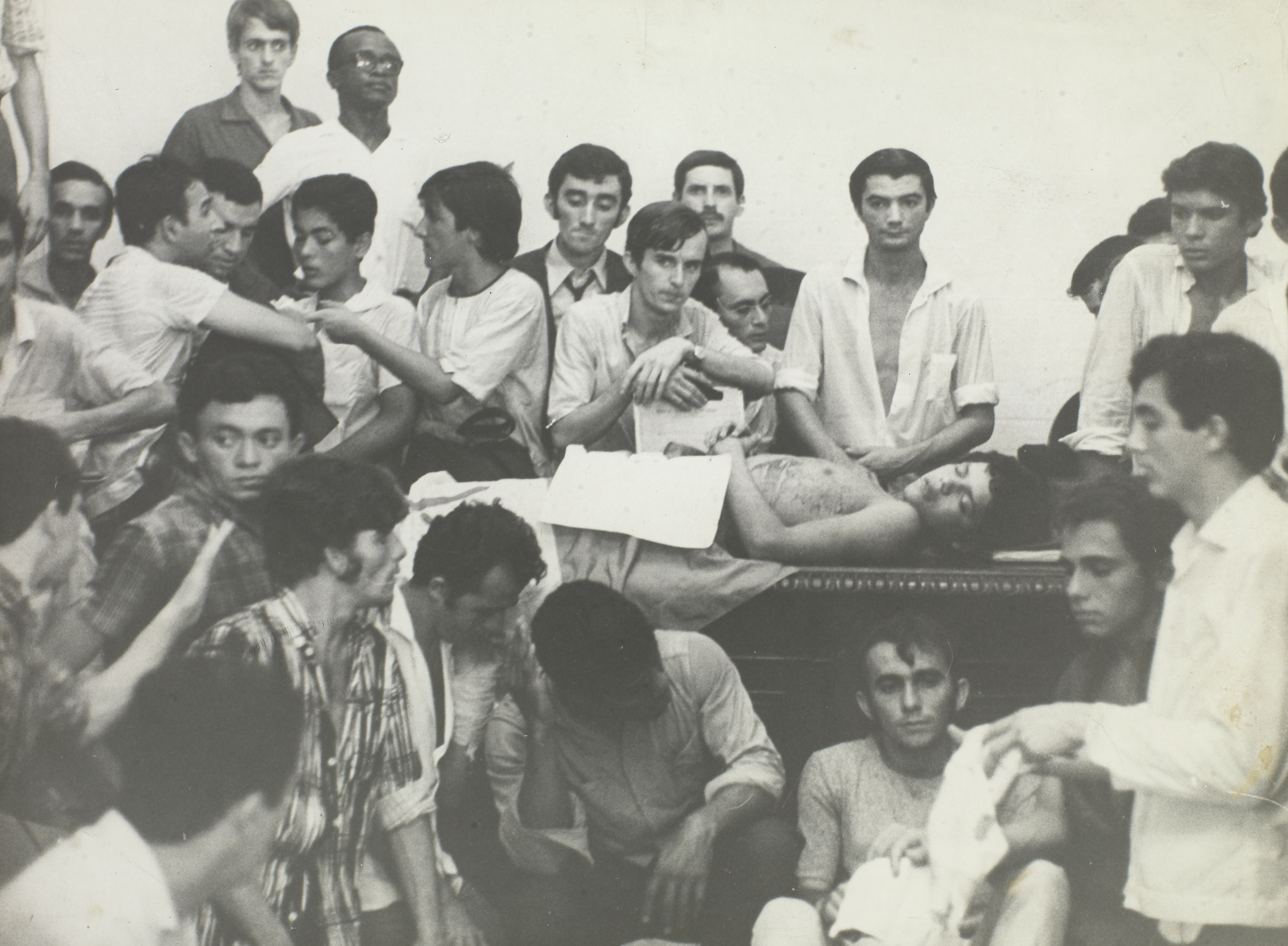
Edson Luís de Lima Souto was one of the first students to be killed by the military state. His killing contributed to tensions preceding the Institutional Act Number Five.

The military dictatorship lasted for almost twenty-one years; despite initial pledges to the contrary, the military government, in 1967, enacted a new, restrictive Constitution, and stifled freedom of speech and political opposition. The regime adopted nationalism and anti-communism as its guidelines.

The dictatorship achieved growth in GDP in the 1970s with the so-called "Brazilian Miracle" while censoring the media and committing widespread human rights abuses, including torturing and assassinating dissidents. João Figueiredo became president in March 1979; in the same year he passed the Amnesty Law for political crimes committed for and against the regime. By this time soaring inequality and economic instability had replaced the earlier growth, and Figueiredo could not control the crumbling economy, chronic inflation and concurrent fall of other military dictatorships in South America. Amid massive popular demonstrations in the streets of the main cities of the country, the first free elections in 20 years were held for the national legislature in 1982. In 1988, a new Constitution was passed and Brazil officially returned to democracy. Since then, the military has remained under the control of civilian politicians, with no official role in domestic politics.

In May 2018, the United States government released a memorandum, written by Henry Kissinger, dating back to April 1974 (when he was serving as Secretary of State), confirming that the leadership of the Brazilian military regime was fully aware of the killing of dissidents. It is estimated that 434 people were either confirmed killed or went missing (not to be seen again), 8,000 indigenous people suffered a genocide and 20,000 people were tortured during the military dictatorship in Brazil, while some human rights activists and others assert that the true figure could be much higher.

== Sixth Republic (1985–present) ==
Tancredo Neves was elected president in an indirect election in 1985 as the nation returned to civilian rule. He died before being sworn in, and the elected vice president, José Sarney, was sworn in as president in his place.

Fernando Collor de Mello was the first elected president by popular vote after the military regime in December 1989 defeating Luiz Inácio Lula da Silva in a two-round presidential race and 35 million votes. Collor won in the state of São Paulo against many prominent political figures. The first democratically elected President of Brazil in 29 years, Collor spent much of the early years of his government battling hyper-inflation, which at times reached rates of 25% per month.

Collor's neoliberal program was also followed by his successor Fernando Henrique Cardoso, who maintained free trade and privatization programs. Collor's administration began the process of privatization of a number of government-owned enterprises such as Acesita, Embraer, Telebrás and Companhia Vale do Rio Doce. With the exception of Acesita, the privatizations were all completed during the term of Fernando Henrique Cardoso.

Following Collor's impeachment, acting president, Itamar Franco, was sworn in as president. In elections held on October 3, 1994, Fernando Henrique Cardoso, his finance minister, defeated left-wing Lula da Silva again. He was elected president due to the success of the so-called Plano Real. Reelected in 1998, he guided Brazil through a wave of financial crises. In 2000, Cardoso ordered the declassification of some military files concerning Operation Condor, a network of South American military dictatorships that kidnapped and assassinated political opponents.

Brazil's most severe problem today is arguably its highly unequal distribution of wealth and income, one of the most extreme in the world. By the 1990s, more than one out of four Brazilians continued to survive on less than one dollar a day. These socio-economic contradictions helped elect Luiz Inácio Lula da Silva of the Partido dos Trabalhadores (PT) in 2002. On 1 January 2003, Lula was sworn in as the first-ever elected leftist President of Brazil.

In the few months before the election, investors were scared by Lula's campaign platform for social change, and his past identification with labour unions and leftist ideology. As his victory became more certain, the Real devalued and Brazil's investment risk rating plummeted (the causes of these events are disputed since Cardoso left a very small foreign reserve). After taking office, however, Lula maintained Cardoso's economic policies, warning that social reforms would take years and that Brazil had no alternative but to extend fiscal austerity policies. The Real and the nation's risk rating soon recovered.

Lula, however, has given a substantial increase in the minimum wage (raising from R$200 to R$350 in four years). Lula also spearheaded legislation to drastically cut retirement benefits for public servants. His primary significant social initiative, on the other hand, was the Fome Zero (Zero Hunger) program, designed to give each Brazilian three meals a day.

In 2005 Lula's government suffered a serious blow with several accusations of corruption and misuse of authority against his cabinet, forcing some of its members to resign. Most political analysts at the time were certain that Lula's political career was doomed, but he managed to hold onto power, partly by highlighting the achievements of his term (e.g., reduction in poverty, unemployment and dependence on external resources, such as oil), and to distance himself from the scandal. Lula was re-elected President in the general elections of October 2006.

The income of the poorest increased by 14% in 2004, with Bolsa Familia accounting for an estimated two-thirds of this growth. In 2004, Lula launched the "popular pharmacies" programme, designed to make medicines considered essential and accessible to the most disadvantaged. During Lula's first term in office, child malnutrition declined by 46 per cent. In May 2010, the UN World Food Programme (WFP) awarded Lula da Silva the title of "world champion in the fight against hunger".

Having served two terms as president, Lula was forbidden by the Brazilian Constitution from standing again. In the 2010 presidential election, the PT candidate was Dilma Rousseff. Rousseff won and assumed office on January 1, 2011, as the country's first female president.

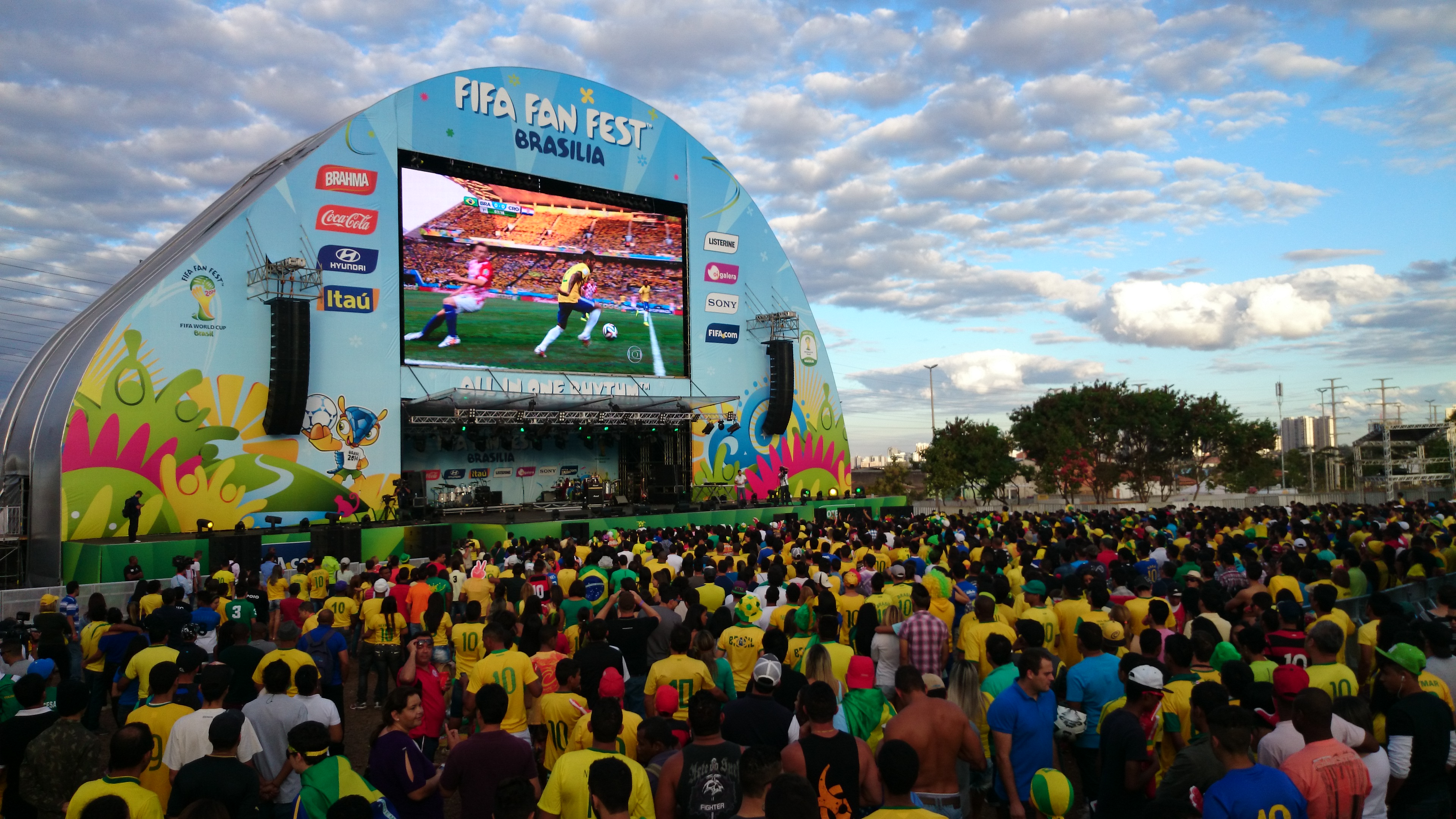
Brazilian football fans at the FIFA Fan Fest in Brasília, during the 2014 FIFA World Cup

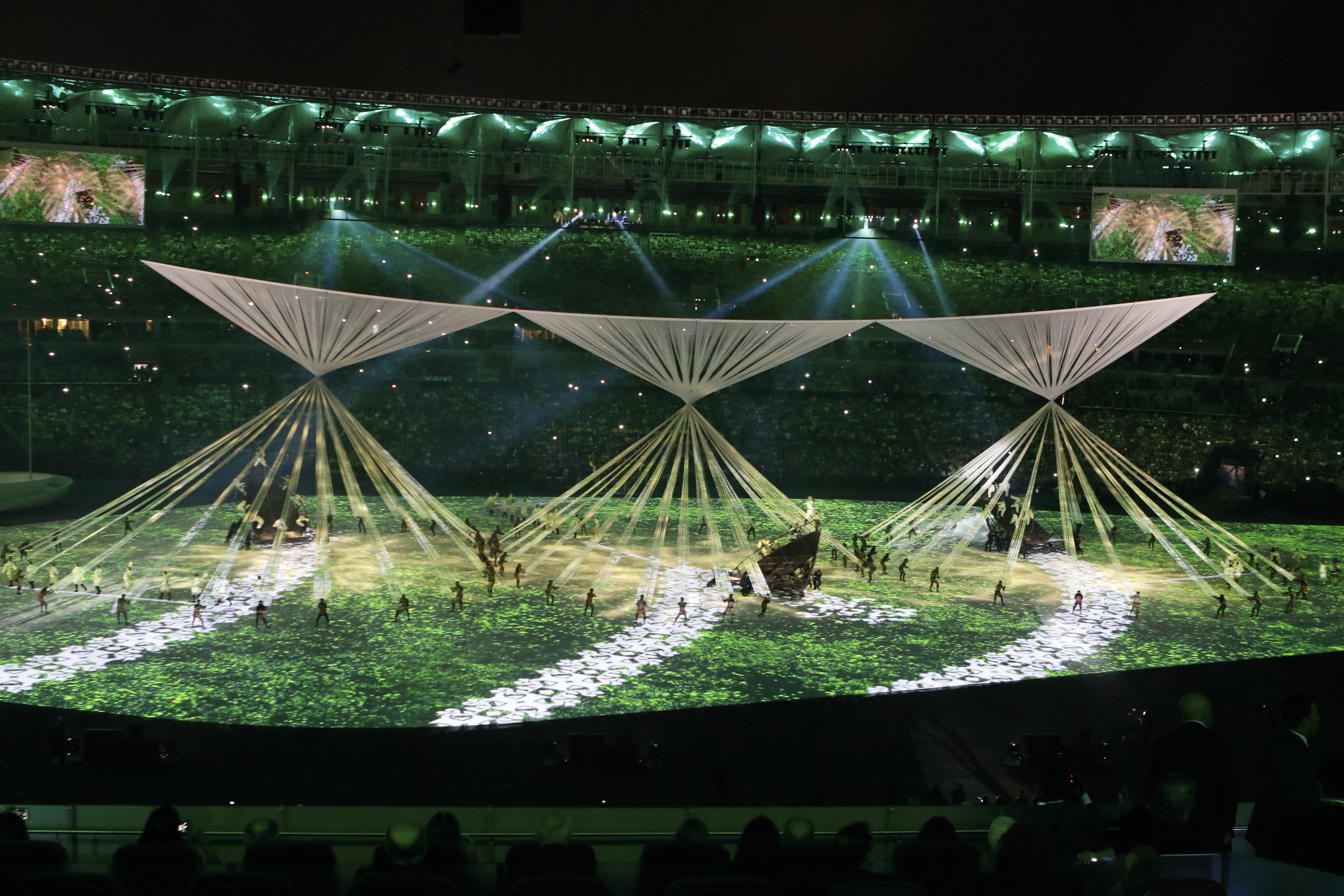
A scene from the opening ceremony of the 2016 Summer Olympics in Rio de Janeiro

Brazil won the right to host the 2014 FIFA World Cup and the 2016 Summer Olympics.

Nationwide protests broke out in 2013 and 2014 primarily over public transport fares and government expenditures on the 2014 FIFA World Cup. Rousseff faced a conservative challenger for her re-election bid in the October 26, 2014, runoff, but managed to secure re-election with just over 51% of votes. Protests resumed in 2015 and 2016 in response to a corruption scandal and a recession that began in 2014, resulting in the impeachment of President Rousseff for mismanagement and disregard of the national budget in August 2016. In 2016, Rio de Janeiro was the host of the 2016 Summer Olympics and the 2016 Summer Paralympics, making the city the first South American and Portuguese-speaking city to ever host the events, and the third time the Olympics were held in a Southern Hemisphere city.

In October 2018, far-right congressman and former army captain Jair Bolsonaro was elected President of Brazil, disrupting sixteen years of continuous left-wing rule by the Worker's Party (PT). With an unprecedented corruption scandal eroding the public's trust of institutions, Bolsonaro's position as a political outsider along with his hardline ideology against crime and corruption helped him win the presidential election.

During Bolsonaro's presidency, the installation of wind energy and solar energy reached its highest level in Brazilian history. One of the main objectives of the Bolsonaro Government is to try to complete the execution of more than 14,000 works promised by previous governments, which were never completed, many not even started. According to calculations, the execution and completion of works that have already started would cost something around R$144 billion. These public works include expanding and developing roadways and railways.

It was during the Bolsonaro government that the COVID-19 pandemic began. In the year 2020, the first of the pandemic, the Brazilian gross domestic product plummeted by more than 4%. It was also during 2020 that the protests against the current Brazilian government and the impeachment orders against Bolsonaro gained strength, motivated by unscientific statements—inspired by Donald Trump—propagated by the Brazilian president, who encouraged the use of medicines without medical evidence and discouraged the use of masks and vaccination. Under pressure from the Brazilian Congress, during the pandemic, "emergency assistance" was created for low-income people (in the amount of R$600). In 2021, the second year of the pandemic, the Brazilian Senate created a parliamentary inquiry commission (CPI, in Portuguese) to investigate President Bolsonaro's conduct of the pandemic. During the Bolsonaro government, Brazil reached 33 million people suffering from hunger, a number that less than 2 years earlier was 19.1 million, also during his government, Brazil became the second country with the most deaths from COVID-19, more than 670,000 deaths with more than 30 million infections were reported.

Several allegations of corruption erupted in the Bolsonaro government, such as Covaxgate, the "Tractorgate"(Tratoraço in Portuguese), and the "Bolsolão do MEC".

On January 1, 2023, Luiz Inácio Lula da Silva returned to the office of the presidency, becoming the 39th president of Brazil.

=== Religious change ===
Until recently Catholicism was overwhelmingly dominant. Rapid change in the 21st century has led to a growth in secularism. Just as dramatic is the sudden rise of evangelical Protestantism to over 22% of the population. The 2010 census indicates that fewer than 65% of Brazilians consider themselves Catholic, down from 90% in 1970. The decline is associated with falling birth rates to one of Latin America's lowest at 1.83 children per woman, which is below replacement levels. It has led Cardinal Cláudio Hummes to comment, "We wonder with anxiety: how long will Brazil remain a Catholic country?".

== See also ==
- Timeline of Brazilian history

== Cited sources ==
- Russell-Wood, A.J.R. (1996). "Brazil: The Colonial Era, 1500–1808". Encyclopedia of Latin American History and Culture. Vol. 1. New York: Charles Scribner's Sons. ISBN 978-0684804804.
