= Tamoio people =

Ethnic group in Brazil

Tamoio
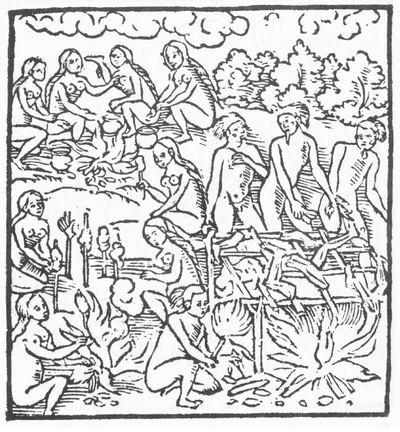

Languages
- Old Tupi

Religion
- Indigenous Religion

Related ethnic groups
- Tupinambá people

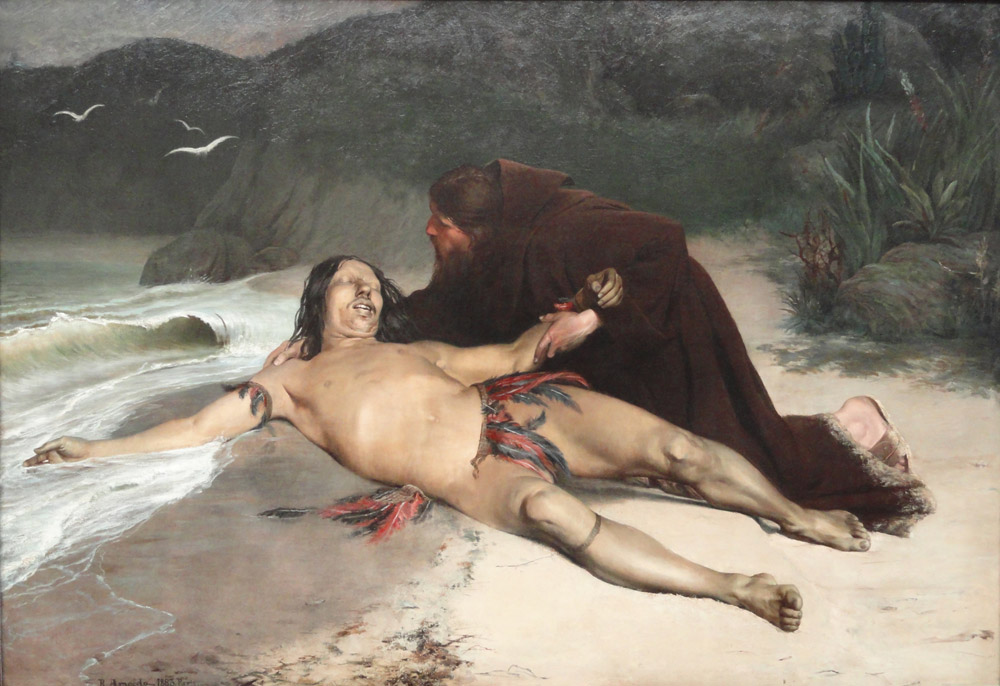
Rodolfo Amoedo's 1883 painting "O Último Tamoio" (The last Tamoio), depicting Aimberê

The Tamoio were a confederation of mostly Tupi-speaking indigenous groups that inhabited the coast of the present-day states of São Paulo and Rio de Janeiro in Brazil. Their territory included the Bay of Guanabara, extending from what is now Rio de Janeiro to the northern coast of São Paulo, near the city of Bertioga. The group’s population is estimated at approximately 70,000 people at the time of European contact.

Anthropologists Beatriz Perrone-Moysés and Renato Sztutman argue that the term "Tamoio" did not refer to a homogeneous indigenous people, but rather to a "collective of leaders" from different tribes who formed an alliance among themselves and with the French against the Portuguese colonizers. While the Tupinambá tribes are the most associated with the Tamoios, the confederation also encompassed tribes from the Guaianá, Aimoré and Goitacá peoples.

The ethnonym "Tamoio" comes from "ta'mõi," which, in the Tupi language, means "grandparents," indicating that they were the Tupi group that had been established on the Brazilian coast for the longest time.

The Tamoio Confederation would be defeated during the War of the Tamoio Confederation, after which most of their members would die due to the war or European diseases.

== Presence in daily life ==
- In the state of São Paulo, the highway that connects São José dos Campos to Caraguatatuba, on the north coast, the former lands of the Tamoio was named Rodovia dos Tamoios (Tamoio Highway).
- The current 2nd district of the city of Cabo Frio is called Tamoios because it was one of the last strongholds of the Tamoio Confederation.
- Several cities have also named streets and avenues after the Tamoios, including São Paulo, Itanhaém, Tupã, Lins, Diadema, and Praia Grande, among others.
