= Cunhambebe =

Chieftain of the Tupinambá tribe

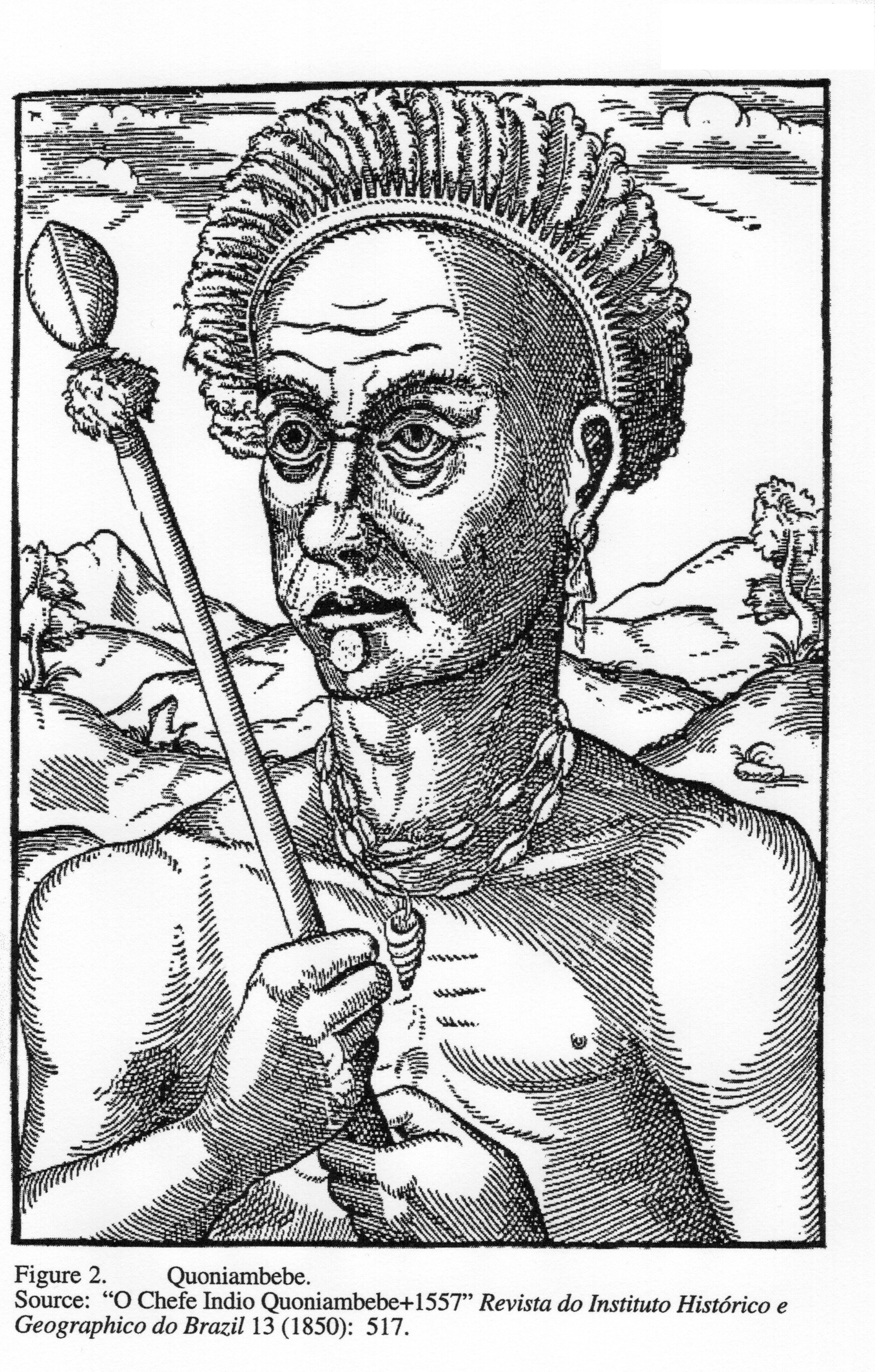
Quoniambebe as depicted on the pages of The Journal of the Brazilian Institute of History and Geography from André Thevet's La Cosmographie Universelle published thirty years before the example below.

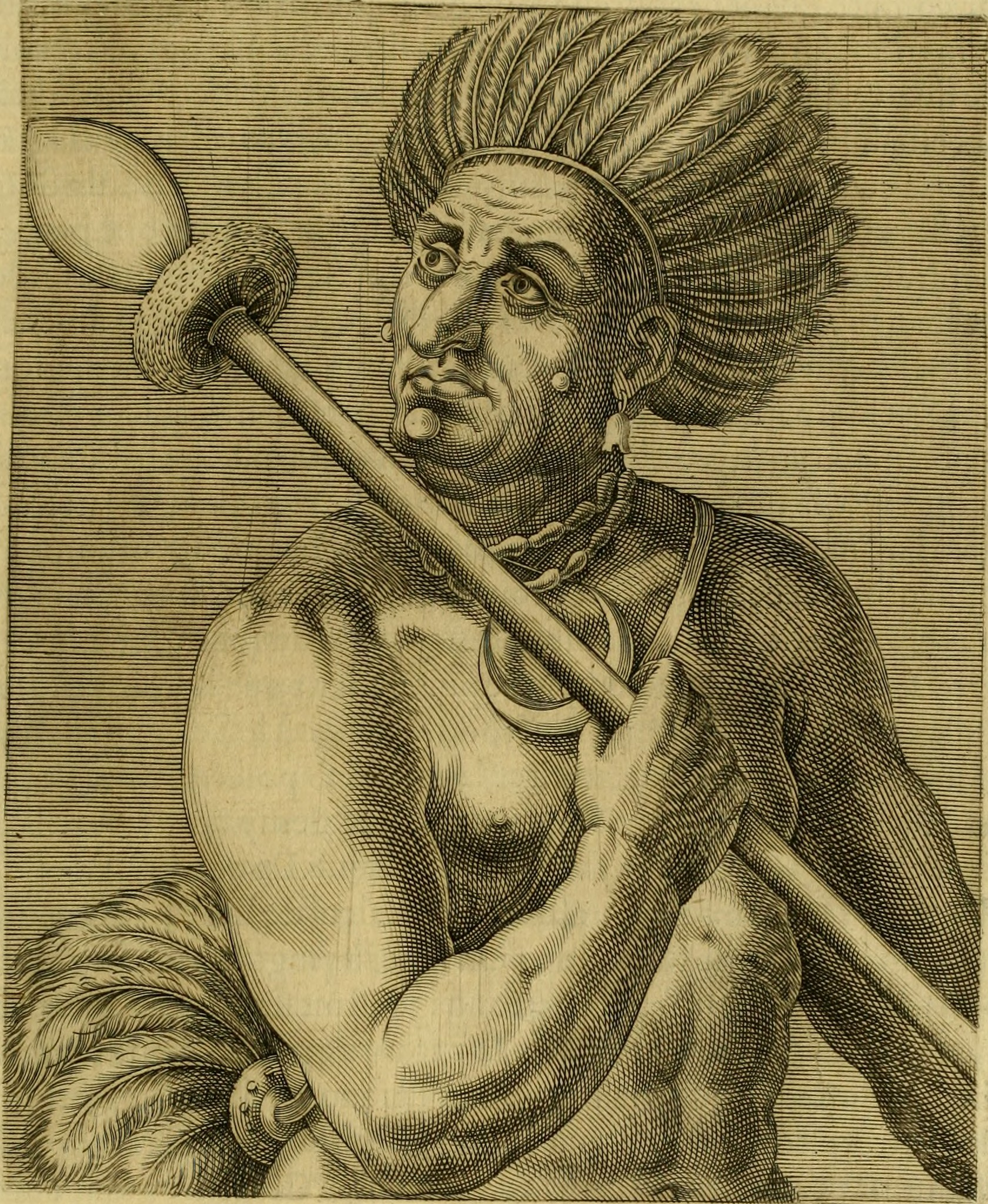
Cunhambebe, as portrayed by André Thevet, French cosmographer who accompanied the expedition by Nicolas Durand de Villegaignon.

Cunhambebe (sometimes spelled Quoniambec or Quoniambebe) was an Indigenous Brazilian chieftain of the Tupinambá tribe, which dominated the region between present-day Cabo Frio (Rio de Janeiro) and Bertioga (São Paulo). He lived in a village in Iperoig (near present-day Ubatuba).

== Military career ==
Cunhambebe was also the main force and elected chief of the Tamoyo Confederation, a military alliance between the sea coast tribes against the Portuguese colonists. The Tamoyo Confederation waged war against the Portuguese until the Peace of Iperoig in 1567. They also fought the Portuguese forces in alliance with the French invaders commanded by Nicolas Durand de Villegaignon (1510–1571) in the historical episode which became known as the France Antarctique.

According to the description of French priest André de Thevet, the German soldier of fortune and sailor Hans Staden (1525–1579) was a prisoner of Cunhambebe's father (who had the same name) between 1554 and 1557. The Tupinambá were fierce warriors and cannibals, as described by Hans Staden, who narrowly escaped several times of being killed and eaten by Cunhambebe's Indians.

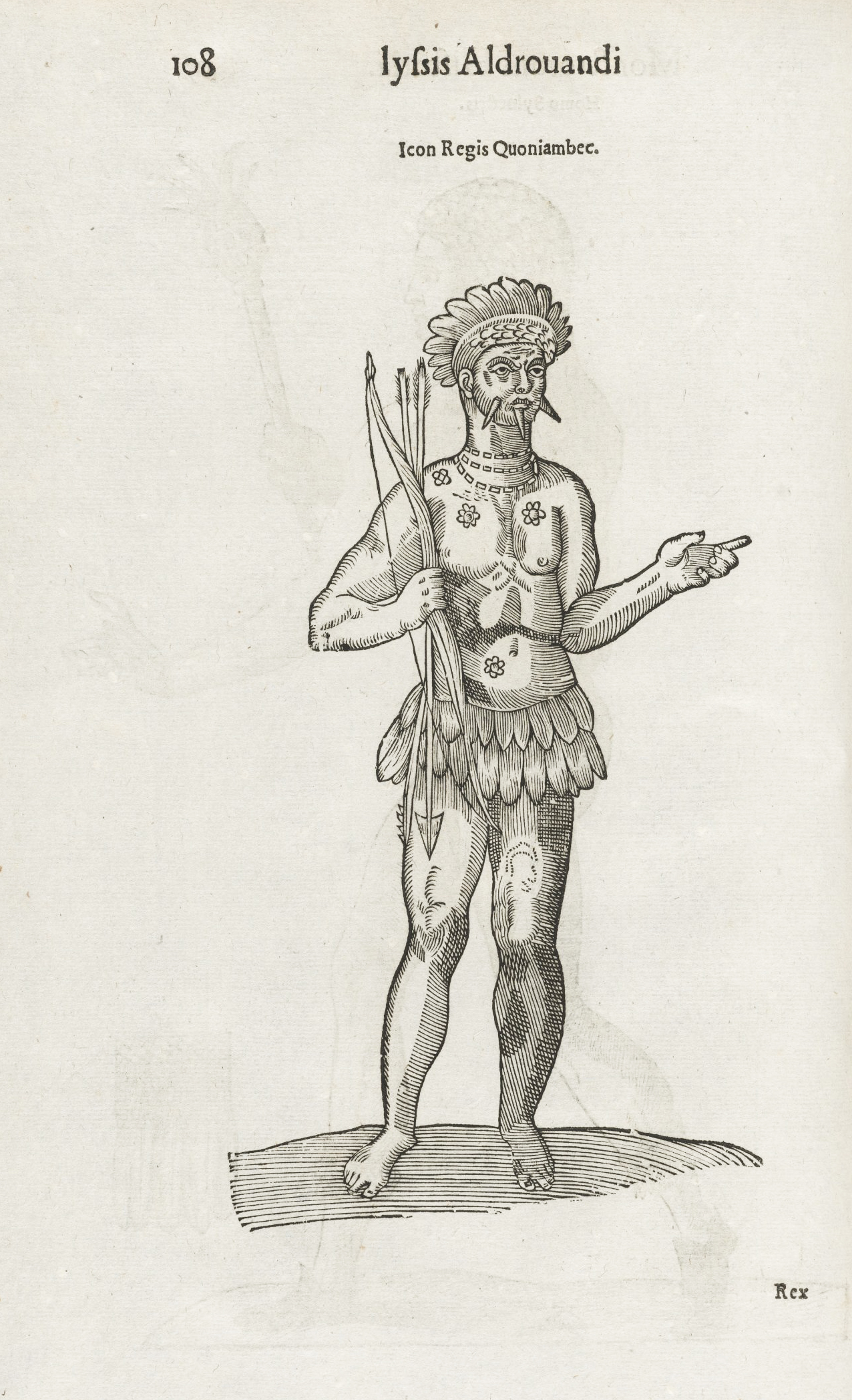
1642 depiction from a book by Ulisse Aldrovandi

The war waged by the Tamoyo Confederation was strongly affecting the Portuguese colonisation efforts, so the two Portuguese Jesuit priests who had founded São Paulo dos Campos de Piratininga (which became the present-day megalopolis of São Paulo), Manoel da Nóbrega (1517–1570) and José de Anchieta (1534–1597) started a peace mission by doing a high risk visit to Cunhambebe's village. Although they were received with mistrust, Anchieta spoke the Tupi language very well and they were spared death.

Eventually, Anchieta succeeded in negotiating a peace treaty, which was respected by Cunhambebe and the Tupinambás. The peace treaty ended when an attack force led by Portuguese knight D. Estácio de Sá (1520–1567) tried to expel the French invaders. In this occasion, the Tamoyo tribes came to help the Frenchmen, particularly because they felt betrayed by the Portuguese, and also because the Temimino tribes, their traditional and bitter enemies, fought on the side of the Portuguese.

== Death ==
Cunhambebe died of bubonic plague sometime after 1563, when he was recorded as accompanying Manoel da Nóbrega (1517–1570) and José de Anchieta (1534–1597) on a diplomatic visit to São Vincente, before the events which eventually led to the almost complete destruction of the Tamoyos towards the end of the 16th century.
