= French and Indian Wars =

1688-1763 series of military conflicts in North America

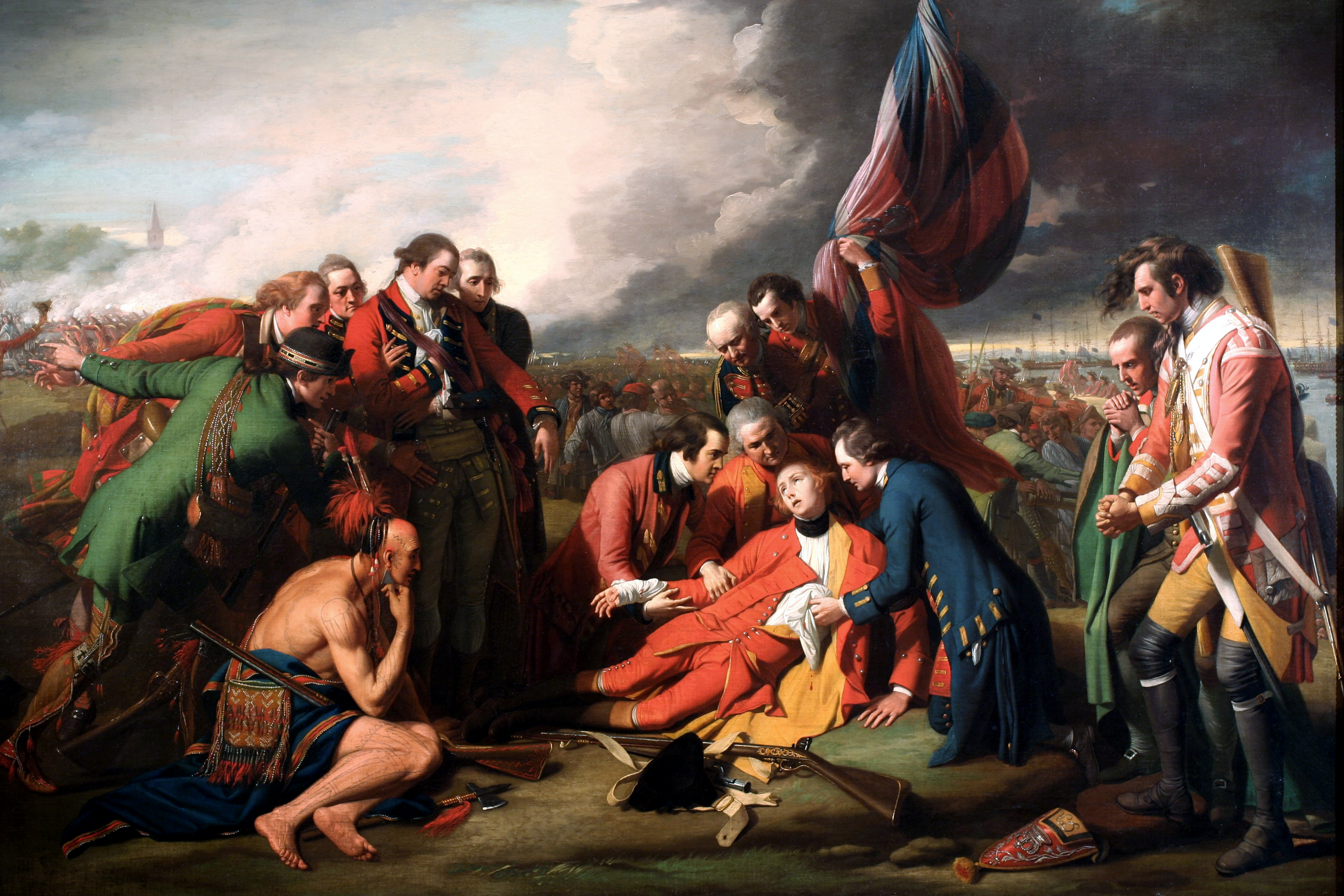
The Battle of the Plains of Abraham, a crucial battle of the French and Indian War

The French and Indian Wars were a series of conflicts in North America between 1688 and 1763, some of which indirectly were related to the European dynastic wars. The title French and Indian War in the singular is used in the United States specifically for the warfare of 1754–1763, which composed the North American theatre of the Seven Years' War and the aftermath of which led to the American Revolution. The French and Indian Wars were preceded by the Beaver Wars.

In Quebec, the various wars are generally referred to as the Intercolonial Wars. Some conflicts involved Spanish and Dutch forces, but all pitted the Kingdom of Great Britain, its colonies, and their Indigenous allies on one side against the Kingdom of France, its colonies, and its Indigenous allies on the other. A driving cause behind the wars was the desire of each country to take control of the interior territories of North America, as well as the region around Hudson Bay; both were deemed essential to domination of the fur trade.

== Overview ==
The North American wars, and their associated European wars, in sequence, are:

Years of war	US name	Global name	Treaty
1688–1697	King William's War; 1st Intercolonial War (in French)	Nine Years' War	Treaty of Ryswick (1697)
1702–1713	Queen Anne's War; 2nd Intercolonial War; Dummer's War	War of the Spanish Succession	Treaty of Utrecht (1713)
1744–1748	King George's War; 3rd Intercolonial War; War of Jenkins' Ear	War of the Austrian Succession	Treaty of Aix-la-Chapelle (1748)
1754–1763	French and Indian War (in the U.S.); Seven Years' War (in Canada); 4th Intercolonial War or War of the Conquest (in Quebec); Father Le Loutre's War	Seven Years' War	Treaty of Paris (1763)

Naming conflicts after the British monarch of the day is a convention in United States history related to its early European settlement as majority-English colonies. Canadian convention uses the name of the larger European conflict (e.g., the "War of the Grand Alliance" rather than "King William's War") or refers to the wars as the Intercolonial Wars.

As the wars proceeded, the military advantage moved toward the British side. This was chiefly the result of the greater population and productive capacity of the British colonies compared with those of France. In addition, the British had the greater ability to resupply their colonies and project military power by sea. In the first three conflicts, the French were able to offset these factors largely by more effective mobilization of Indigenous allies, but they were finally overwhelmed in the fourth and last war.

The overwhelming victory of the British played a role in the eventual loss of their thirteen American colonies. Without the threat of French invasion, the American colonies saw little need for British military protection. In addition, the American people resented British efforts to limit their colonization of the new French territories to the west of the Appalachian Mountains, as stated in the Proclamation of 1763, in an effort to relieve encroachment on Indigenous territory. These pressures contributed to the American Revolutionary War.

The first three of the French and Indian Wars followed the same basic pattern: they all started in Europe and then moved to North America. Once the conflict broke out in North America, it was mostly fought by colonial militias. The final conflict broke this pattern by beginning in North America. In addition, the British used more regular troops alongside colonial militia. They returned almost none of the French territory seized during the war. France was forced to cede its extensive territory in present-day Canada and Louisiane. The British victory in the French and Indian Wars reduced France's New World empire to St. Pierre and Miquelon (two islands off Newfoundland), a few West Indian islands, and French Guiana.

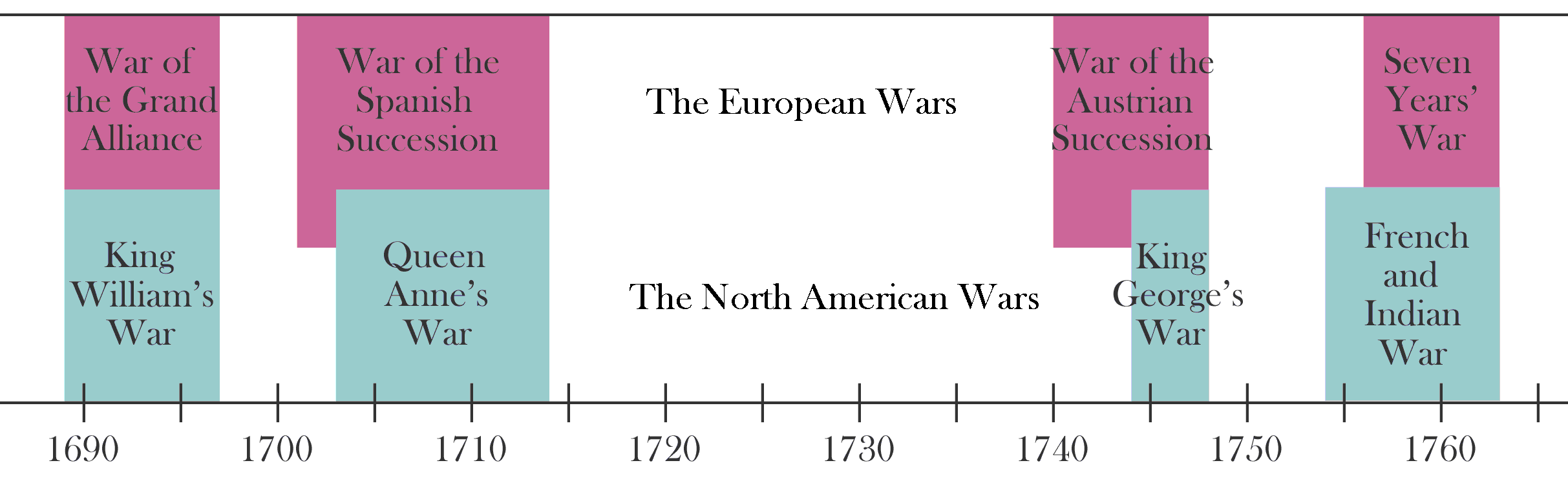
Timeline

== Warfare ==
=== Operational goals ===
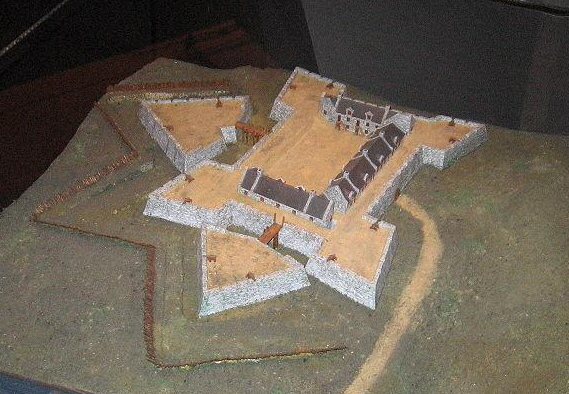
Fort Carillon controlled the portage between Lake George and Lake Champlain.

The belligerents strove in general to control the major transportation and trade routes, not just the sea routes that connected the colonies with the mother country, or the land routes that existed between the different colonies, but also the major fur trade routes leading to the interior of North America. These were normally along lakes and rivers and stretching from the Atlantic to the Mississippi. Many indigenous Nations lived by these routes, and became involved in the wars between the great powers of Europe. The belligerents built fortified positions at major transportation hubs and requested the help of the local indigenous population to defend these, and to attack enemy positions.

=== European tactics ===
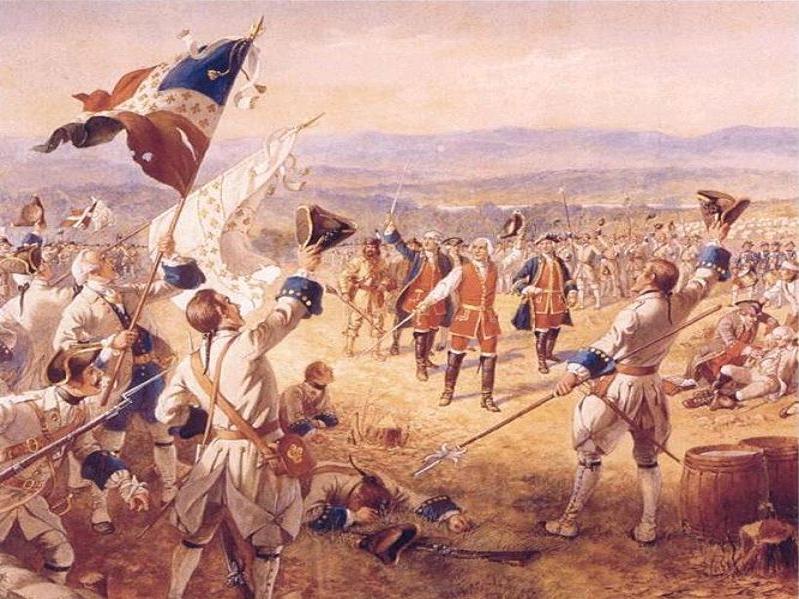
At Carillon the French won a rare victory in a battle fought according to European tactical doctrines.

A common view is that European combat methods and military tactics were not adapted to the American forests and to the indigenous art of war. It is therefore conjectured that the English colonists designed new combat techniques, inspired by the Indigenous combat methods. These techniques, which included cover and stressed ambushes, is supposed to have been the reason why the colonists finally defeated the French, and then the British army during the American Revolutionary War. In reality, however, the French and Indian wars were finally won by Britain through the application of traditional European tactics. The Fortress of Louisbourg surrendered twice after sieges conducted according to the rules of European warfare, and the Battle of the Plains of Abraham 1759 was a European battle fought in closed formations in the open.

=== Petty warfare ===
Although ultimately futile, the French fought according to the tactical doctrine contemporaries called la Petite guerre, or today's guerilla warfare. The numerical inferiority of the French forces in North America made it impossible to fight a war according to standard European tactics. Hence the French to a large extent made use of indigenous allies (see below). The small French population; New France's dependence on the fur trade, mutually profitable for both French and indigenous peoples; and the common threat from the British colonies, made the indigenous peoples willing allies. The Battle of the Monongahela was the largest achievement of the petty warfare tactics. But at the end of the French and Indian War British numerical superiority became overwhelming, in spite of almost the whole male population of Canada being mobilized, and standard European tactics won the day and the war.

== European military forces ==
=== British ===
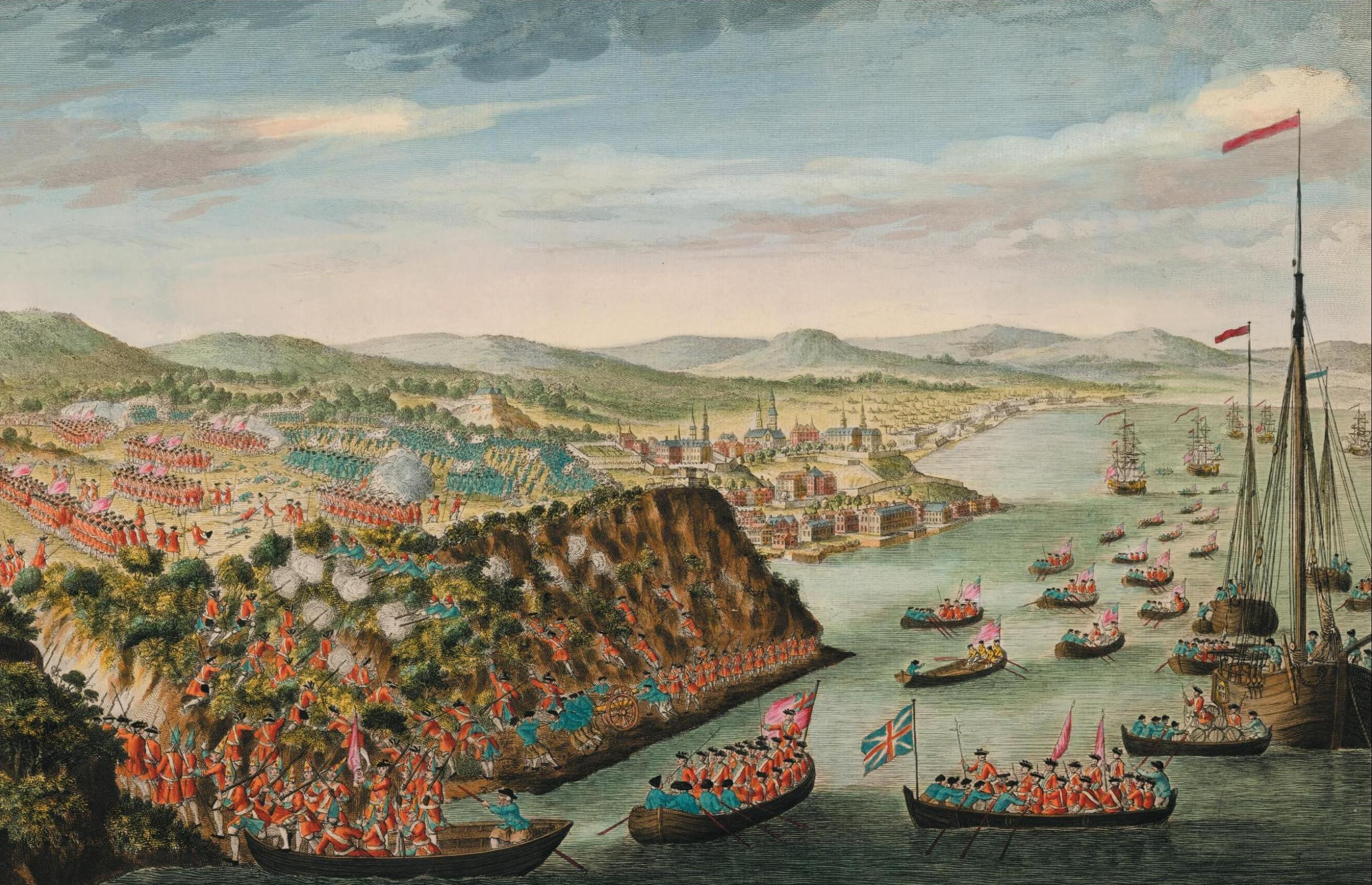
1797 engraving of British Army troops landing during the Battle of the Plains of Abraham

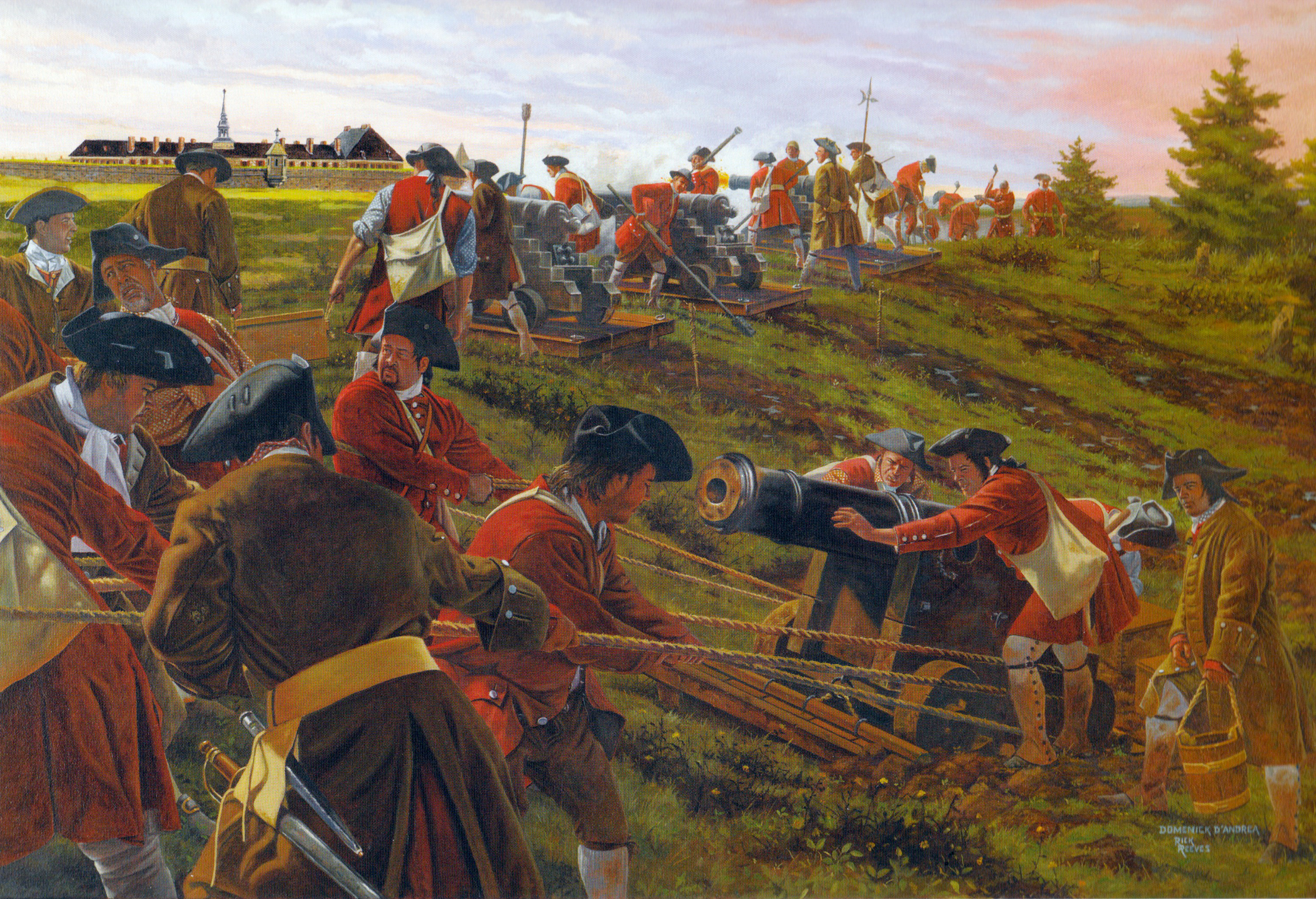
Provincial troops during the siege of Louisbourg in 1745

The British military forces consisted of the British Army's regular regiments and independent companies; the provincial regiments raised by the several colonies in British America, and the colonial militia.

==== British Army ====
The British Army had two types of units in North America: regular regiments serving in the colonies for a duration of time, normally sent there only after war had broken out, and independent companies, permanently based in the colonies as garrisons of forts and fortresses. Like the regular units, independent companies were raised in the British Isles and not the colonies, and consisted of between 50 and 100 troops per unit. Once officers and soldiers of independent companies were sent to the colonies they rarely returned to the British Isles and often became integrated into colonial society. In contrast, the regular regiments sent to North America were constantly moved around and generally remained separate from the colonial population.

==== Provincial troops ====
When war began, the several colonies organized their own military forces, provincial troops, through temporary enlistments. The soldiers came from the lower orders of society, which did not strengthen their reliability or efficiency. Massachusetts Bay, New York and Connecticut usually mobilized large contingents, while the southern colonies always very reluctantly contributed to the imperial cause. The British Army did not have high opinions of the battleworthiness of the provincial troops, with the exception of the ranger units. During conjoint operations the provincial troops were subject to the very strict British Articles of War. The officers of the provincial troops had lower relative rank than the officers of the regular army; a provincial field officer ranked as a senior British captain, although these officers were members of the colonial elite, often members of colonial legislatures. Disputes concerning rank and precedent between regular and provincial officers were common. Junior provincial officers were often popular militia officers, who easily could recruit a company of men.

==== Colonial militia ====
Each colony had its own militia, which in principle contained all able-bodied men 16 to 60 years of age. In reality, however, membership in the militia was restricted to the more substantial members of society, since every militiaman had to provide himself with a musket, knapsack, powder, bullets, flints, and sword. Each local community organized its own militia. The officers were either appointed by the governor or elected by the men. The main task of the local militia was local defense, rarely serving in the field but acting as a more or less efficient home guard.

=== France ===
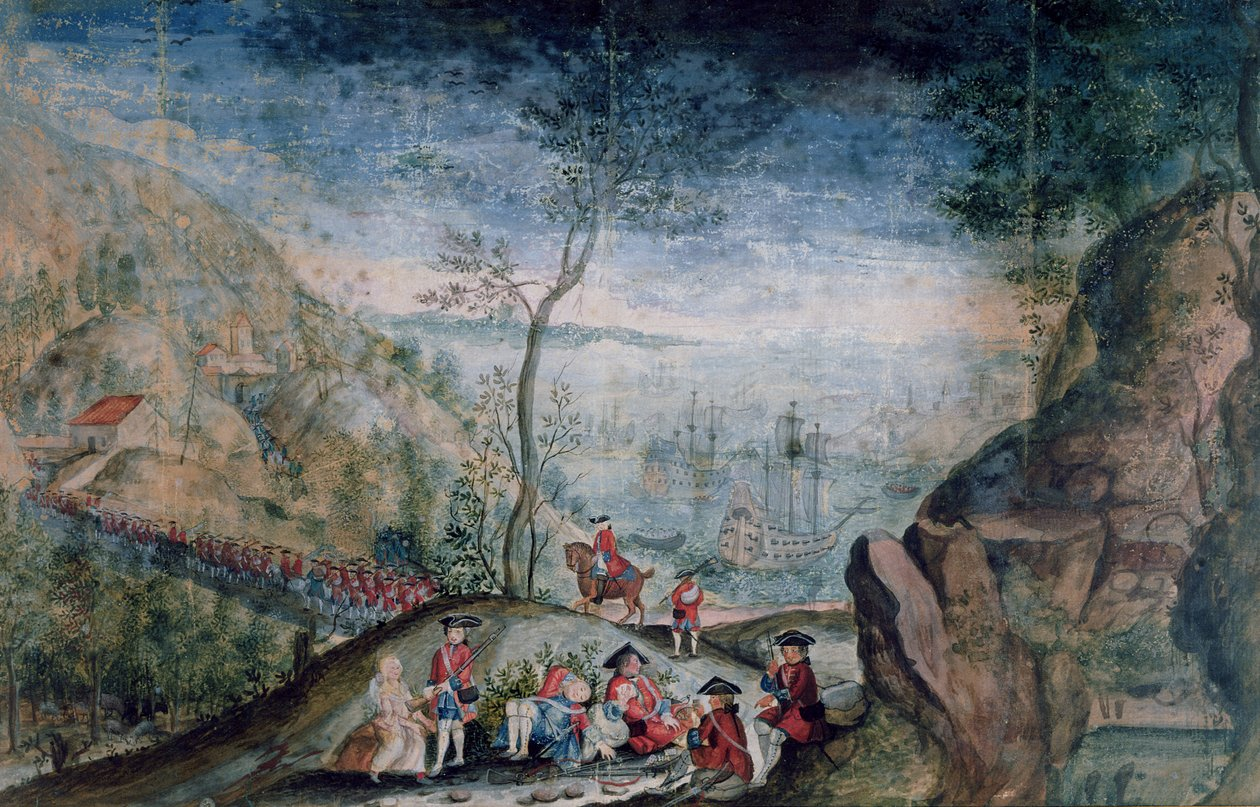
c. 1750 painting of 50 soldiers of the Karrer Regiment disembarking at Louisbourg

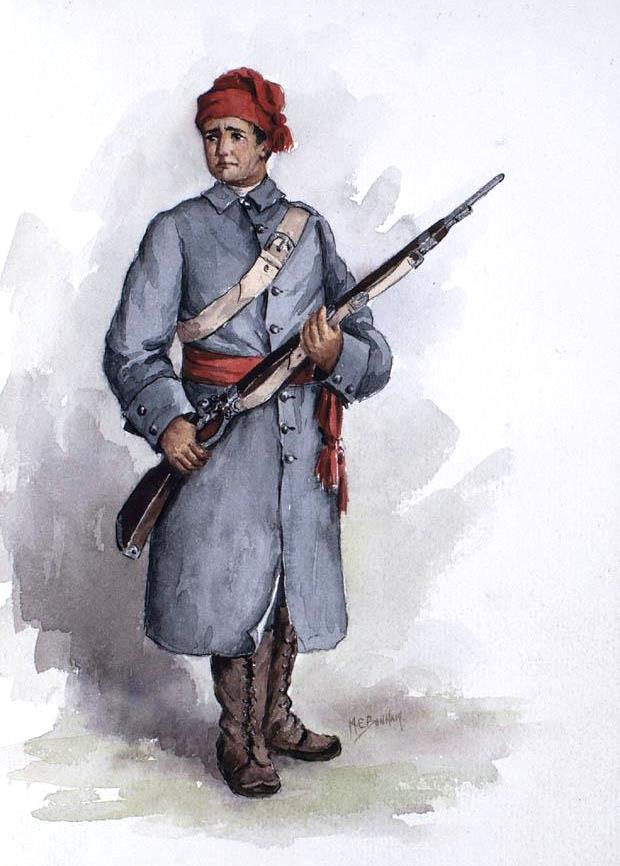
Illustration of a French Canadian militiaman in 1759

The Compagnies Franches de la Marine, the colonial marines, contained the core of the military forces of New France. It was only during the French and Indian War that units from the French Royal Army were transferred to Canada. The colonial militia was more important than its counterpart in British America.

==== Marines ====
The French colonies were administered through the secretary of state for the navy, and naval troops garrisoned New France. The French marines were organized into independent companies called Compagnies franches. During the French and Indian War, naval gunner-bombardier companies were also stationed in North America. The other ranks of the marines were enlisted in France, but the officer corps became increasingly Canadian through recruitment of officers' sons. All promotions were by merit; purchase of commissions was prohibited. The British rangers were an attempt to replicate the tactics of the French colonial marines. The Swiss regiment de Karrer also operated under the Royal French Navy. Its depot was in Rochefort, but its companies served in North American and the Caribbean.

==== French Army ====
In 1754 six battalions from the regiments Artois, Béarn, Bourgogne, Guyenne, Languedoc, and La Reine were transferred to New France. In 1757 two additional battalions arrived from Royal Roussilon and La Sarre, followed the next year by two battalions from de Berry. An artillery company was also sent over the Atlantic.

==== Colonial militia ====
The Canadian colonial militia enjoyed a substantially higher morale and battleworthiness than the British provincial troops and the militia of the British colonies. This was only true, however, when they were employed as home guard or as wilderness warriors. Besides a combat role, the Canadian militia also fulfilled important tasks behind the lines, such as transportation and road building.

== Indigenous allies ==
=== British allies ===
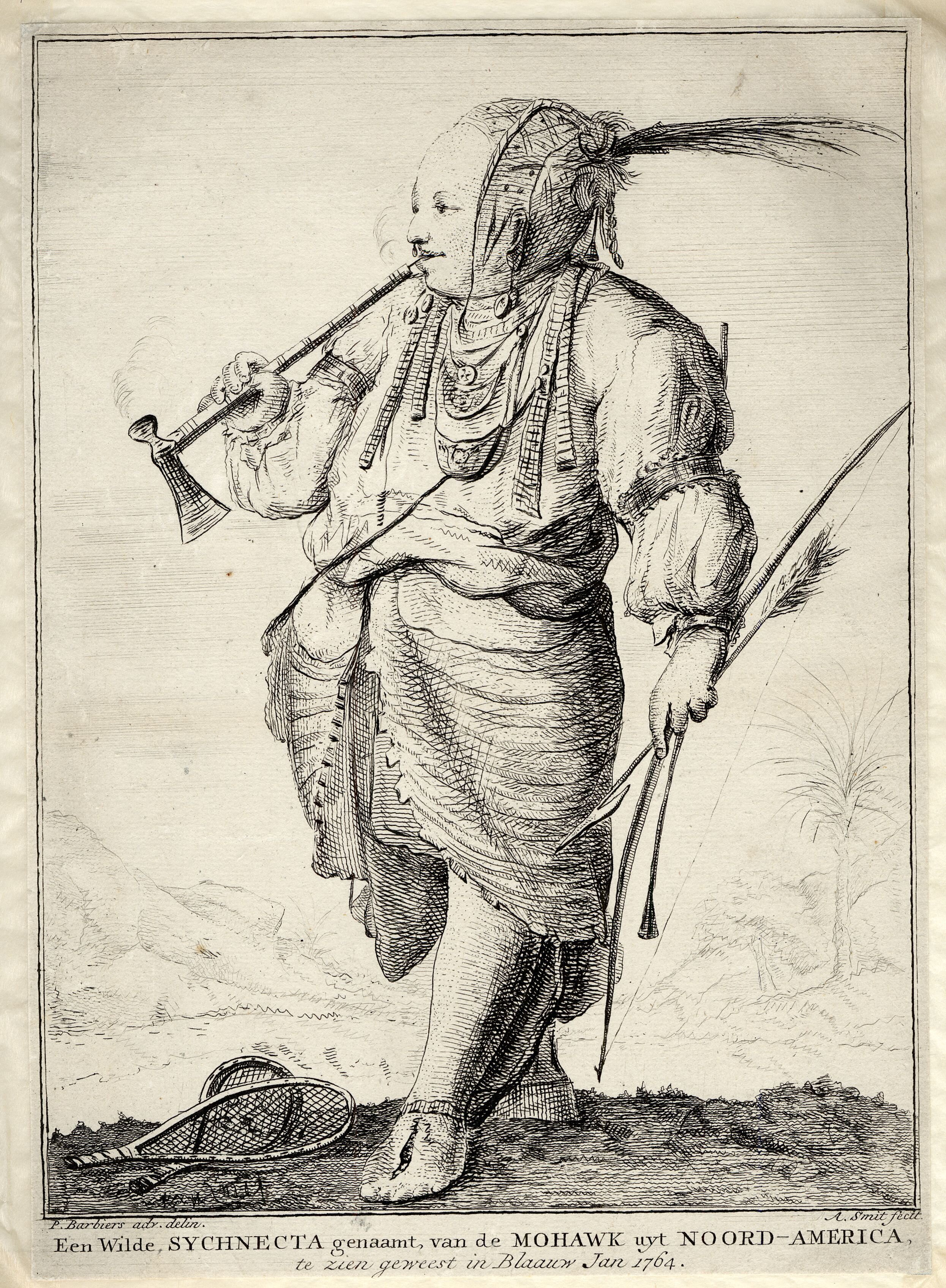
1764 engraving of a Haudenosaunee man named Sychnecta

The Haudenosaunee played an important strategic role in the struggle between Britain and France over northeastern America because of its location east and south of Lake Ontario. The League's aggressive military and commercial policy gave the five Haudenosaunee nations control over large parts of the country, forcing many smaller Indigenous nations into submission. The Haudenosaunee used the Covenant Chain to join with the colony of New York and other British colonies in a compact that generally benefitted the parties and ultimately was disastrous for France.

=== French allies ===
France recognized the independence of the Indigenous tribes while claiming sovereignty over their territory at the same time, as well as the right to plead the cause of their Indigenous allies in the face of other European powers. The French allies accepted this protectorate since it permitted self-government and a traditional lifestyle. The Mi'kmaq and the Abenaki accepted Catholicism as it confirmed their alliance with the French against British colonists in Nova Scotia. Alongside the Mi'kmaq and the Abenaki, France's chief allies were the indiens domiciliés (resident Indians) who lived at the Catholic missions in New France. Many of these were Mohawk from their earlier territory in central New York, but there were also members of other tribes from New England. Fleeing attacks by New England colonists during and after King Philip's War motivated their displacement to French territory. At the end of the French and Indian wars, all resident Indigenous peoples were joined in the confederation of the Seven Nations of Canada.

=== Indigenous-White warfare ===
A pattern of warfare emerged during the clashes between the European colonial powers and the Indigenous peoples of North America which characterized the four major French and Indigenous wars. The complex network of relations was fundamental between some Indigenous tribes and some colonies, the Indigenous tribes becoming the allies of the colonial powers. These alliances were a result of the economic ties that had been formed by the fur trade and by the Indigenous tribes' need for allies against their Indigenous rivals. The warfare included the widespread and escalating abuse of civilians on all sides, in which settlements were attacked, both Colonial and Indigenous, the residents killed or abducted, and houses and crops burned.

== See also ==
- American Indian Wars
- British colonization of the Americas
- Colonial American military history
- Great Britain in the Seven Years' War
- French colonization of the Americas
- Military history of Canada
- Military history of France
- Military history of the United Kingdom
- Military history of the United States
- Second Hundred Years' War
- Sixty Years' War
- French presence in the Ohio Valley
