= French colonization of the Americas =

Map of territorial claims in North America by 1750, before the French and Indian War, which was part of the greater worldwide conflict known as the Seven Years' War (1756 to 1763). Possessions of Britain (pink), France (blue), and Spain. (White border lines mark later Canadian Provinces and US States for reference)

France began colonizing the Americas in the 16th century and continued into the following centuries as it established a colonial empire in the Western Hemisphere. France established colonies in much of eastern North America, on several Caribbean islands, and in South America. Most colonies were developed to export products such as fish, rice, sugar, and furs.

The first French colonial empire stretched to over 10,000,000 km^{2} (3,900,000 sq mi) at its peak in 1710, which was the second largest colonial empire in the world, after the Spanish Empire.

As they colonized the New World, the French established forts and settlements that would become such cities as Quebec, Trois-Rivières and Montreal in Canada; Detroit, Green Bay, St. Louis, Cape Girardeau, Mobile, Biloxi, Baton Rouge and New Orleans in the United States; Port-au-Prince and Cap-Haïtien (founded as Cap-Français) in Haiti; Saint-Pierre and Fort Saint-Louis (formerly as Fort Royal) in Martinique; Castries (founded as Carénage) in Saint Lucia; Cayenne in French Guiana and São Luís (founded as Saint-Louis de Maragnan) in Brazil.

== North America ==
=== Background ===
The French first came to the New World as travelers seeking a route to the Pacific Ocean and wealth. Major French exploration of North America began under the rule of Francis I, King of France. In 1524, Francis sent Italian-born Giovanni da Verrazzano to explore the region between Florida and Newfoundland for a route to the Pacific Ocean. He would find parts of New York Harbor. The French would take narrow land ports of the Boroughs Queens and Brooklyn from the upper and lower parts of the harbor until 1609 when the British and the Dutch came to take control of it from the French Verrazzano. He would later give the names Francesca and Nova Gall to that land between New Spain and English Newfoundland, thus promoting French interests.

=== Colonization ===
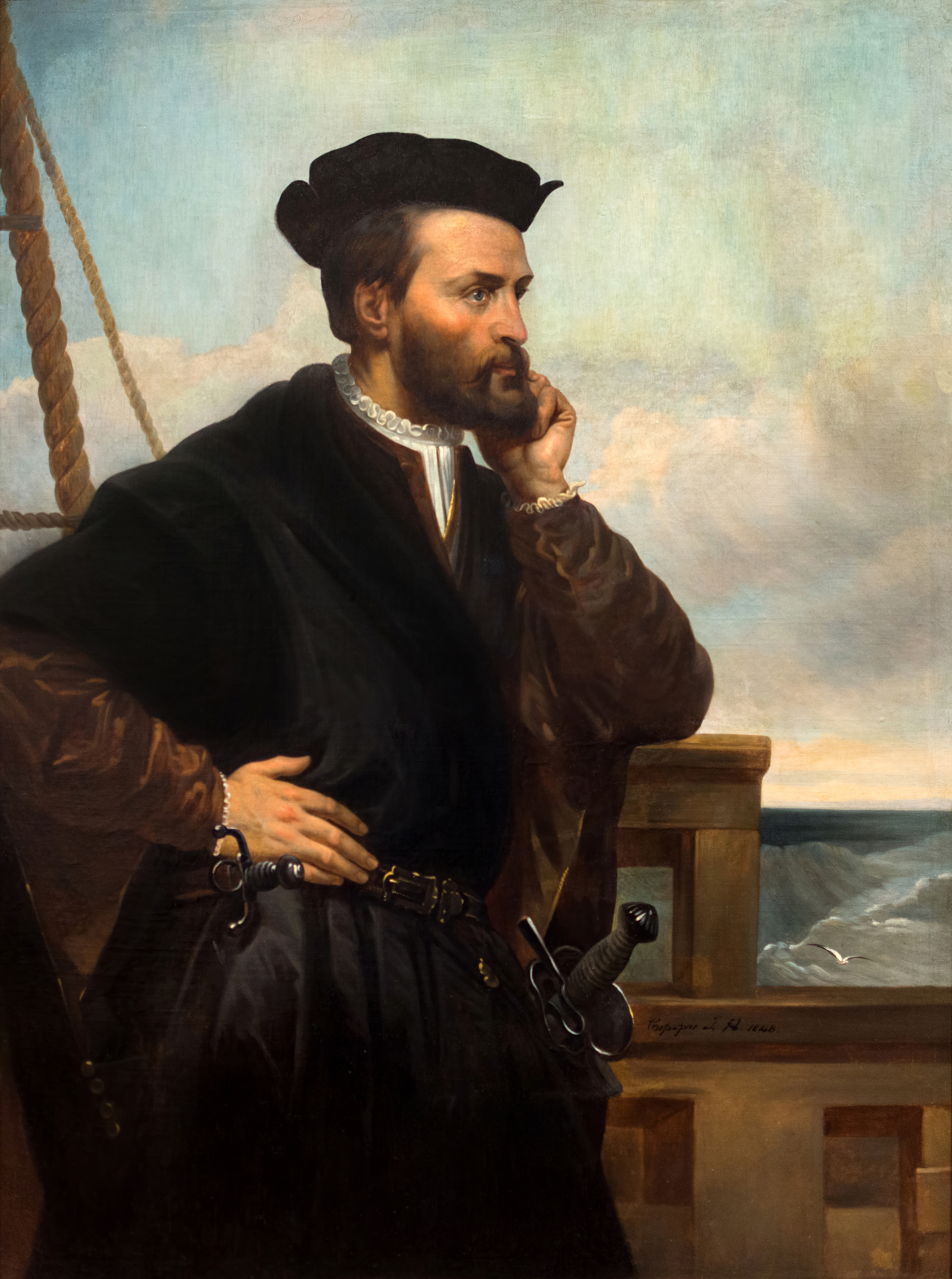
Portrait of Jacques Cartier by Théophile Hamel, arr. 1844

In 1534, Francis I of France sent Jacques Cartier on the first of three voyages to explore the coast of Newfoundland and the St. Lawrence River. He founded New France by planting a cross on the shore of the Gaspé Peninsula. The French subsequently tried to establish several colonies throughout North America that failed, due to weather, disease, or conflict with other European powers. Cartier attempted to create the first permanent European settlement in North America at Cap-Rouge (Quebec City) in 1541 with 400 settlers but the settlement was abandoned the next year after bad weather and attacks from Native Americans in the area. A small group of French troops were left on Parris Island, South Carolina in 1562 to build Charlesfort, but left after a year when they were not resupplied by France. Fort Caroline established in present-day Jacksonville, Florida, in 1564, lasted only a year before being destroyed by the Spanish from St. Augustine. An attempt to settle convicts on Sable Island off Nova Scotia in 1598 failed after a short time. In 1599, a sixteen-person trading post was established in Tadoussac (in present-day Quebec), of which only five men survived the first winter. In 1604 Pierre Du Gua de Monts and Samuel de Champlain founded a short-lived French colony, the first in Acadia, on Saint Croix Island, presently part of the state of Maine, which was much plagued by illness, perhaps scurvy. The following year the settlement was moved to Port Royal, located in present-day Nova Scotia.

Samuel de Champlain founded Quebec (1608) and explored the Great Lakes. In 1634, Jean Nicolet founded La Baye des Puants (present-day Green Bay), which is one of the oldest permanent European settlements in America. In 1634, Sieur de Laviolette founded Trois-Rivières. In 1642, Paul de Chomedey, Sieur de Maisonneuve, founded Fort Ville-Marie which is now known as Montreal. Louis Jolliet and Jacques Marquette founded Sault Sainte Marie (1668) and Saint Ignace (1671) and explored the Mississippi River. At the end of the 17th century, René-Robert Cavelier, Sieur de La Salle established a network of forts going from the Gulf of Mexico to the Great Lakes and the Saint Lawrence River. Fort Saint Louis was established in Texas in 1685, but was gone by 1688. Antoine de la Mothe Cadillac founded Fort Pontchartrain du Détroit (modern-day Detroit) in 1701 and Jean-Baptiste Le Moyne, Sieur de Bienville founded La Nouvelle Orléans (New Orleans) in 1718. Pierre Le Moyne d'Iberville founded Baton Rouge in 1719.

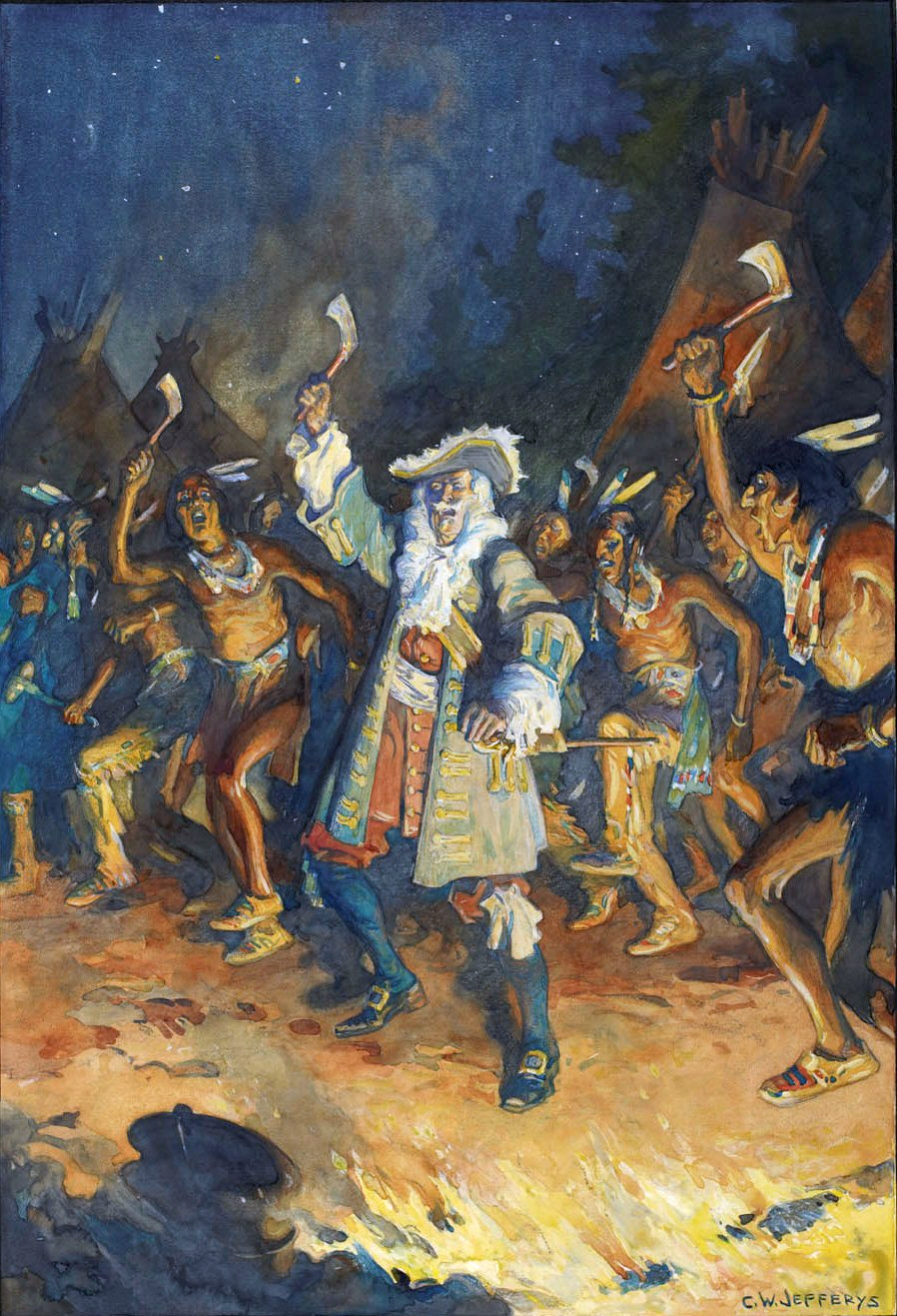
Governor Frontenac performing a tribal dance with Indian allies

The European settlement of Mobile, Alabama began with French colonists, who in 1702 constructed Fort Louis de la Louisiane, at Twenty-seven Mile Bluff on the Mobile River, as the first capital of the French colony of La Louisiane. It was founded by French Canadian brothers Pierre Le Moyne d'Iberville and Jean-Baptiste Le Moyne, Sieur de Bienville, to establish control over France's claims to La Louisiane. Bienville was appointed as royal governor of French Louisiana in 1701. Mobile's Roman Catholic parish was established on July 20, 1703, by Jean-Baptiste de la Croix de Chevrières de Saint-Vallier, Bishop of Quebec. The parish was the first French Catholic parish established on the Gulf Coast of the United States.

In 1704 the ship Pélican delivered 23 French women to the colony; passengers had contracted yellow fever at a stop in Havana. Though most of the "Pélican girls" recovered, numerous colonists and neighboring Native Americans contracted the disease in turn and many died. This early period was also the occasion of the importation of the first African slaves, transported aboard a French supply ship from the French colony of Saint-Domingue in the Caribbean, where they had first been held. The population of the colony fluctuated over the next few years, growing to 279 persons by 1708, yet shrinking to 178 persons two years later due to disease.

These additional outbreaks of disease and a series of floods resulted in Bienville ordering that the settlement be relocated in 1711 several miles downriver to its present location at the confluence of the Mobile River and Mobile Bay. A new earth-and-palisade Fort Louis was constructed at the new site during this time. By 1712, when Antoine Crozat was appointed to take over administration of the colony, its population had reached 400 persons.

The capital of La Louisiane was moved in 1720 to Biloxi, leaving Mobile to serve as a regional military and trading center. In 1723 the construction of a new brick fort with a stone foundation began and it was renamed Fort Condé in honor of Louis Henri, Duke of Bourbon.

In 1763, the Treaty of Paris was signed, ending the Seven Years' War, which Britain won, defeating France. By this treaty, France ceded its territories east of the Mississippi River to Britain. This area was made a part of the expanded British West Florida colony. The British changed the name of Fort Condé to Fort Charlotte, after Queen Charlotte.

The French were eager to explore North America but New France remained largely unpopulated. Due to the lack of women, intermarriages between French and Indians were frequent, giving rise to the Métis people. Relations between the French and Indians were usually peaceful. As the 19th-century historian Francis Parkman stated:

"Spanish civilization crushed the Indian; English civilization scorned and neglected him; French civilization embraced and cherished him."

— Francis Parkman.

To boost the French population, Cardinal Richelieu issued an act declaring that Indians converted to Catholicism were considered "natural Frenchmen" by the Ordonnance of 1627:

"The descendants of the French who have accustomed to this country [New France], together with all the Indians who will be brought to the knowledge of the faith and will profess it, shall be deemed and renowned natural Frenchmen, and as such may come to live in France when they want, and acquire, donate, and succeed and accept donations and legacies, just as true French subjects, without being required to take no letters of declaration of naturalization."

Louis XIV also tried to increase the population by sending approximately 800 young women nicknamed the "King's Daughters". However, the low density of the population in New France remained a very persistent problem. At the beginning of the French and Indian War (1754–1763), the British population in North America outnumbered the French 20 to 1. France fought a total of six colonial wars in North America (see the four French and Indian Wars as well as Father Rale's War and Father Le Loutre's War).

=== French Florida ===
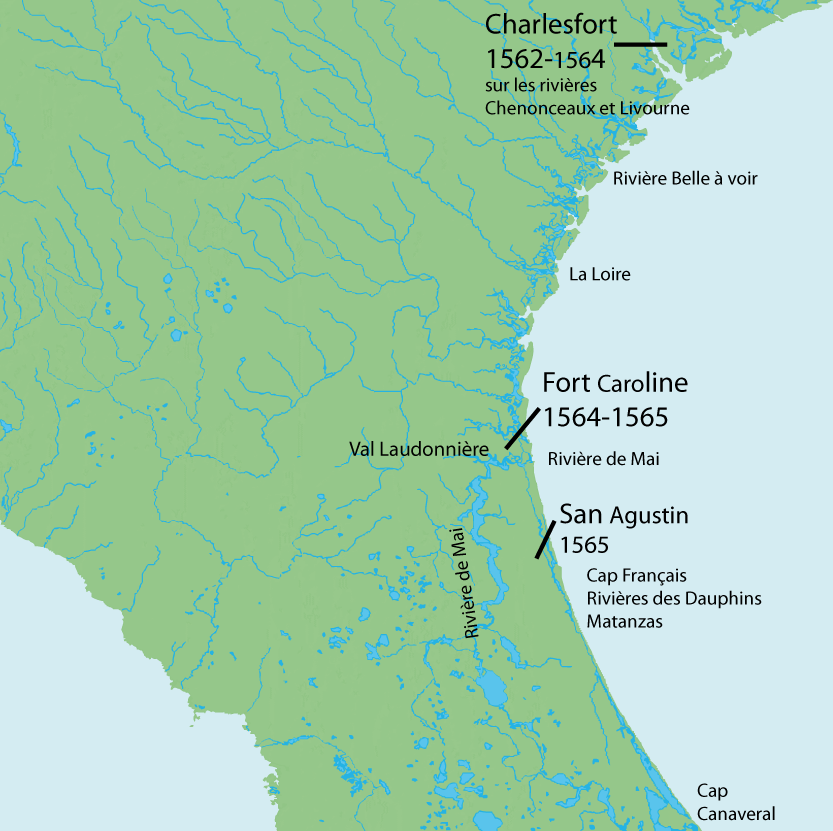
Map of French Florida

In 1562, Charles IX, under the leadership of Admiral Gaspard de Coligny sent Jean Ribault and a group of Huguenot settlers in an attempt to colonize the Atlantic coast and found a colony on a territory which would take the name of the French Florida. They discovered the sound and Port Royal Island, which would be called Parris Island in South Carolina, on which he built a fort named Charlesfort. The group, led by René Goulaine de Laudonnière, moved to the south where they founded the Fort Caroline on the Saint John's river in Florida on June 22, 1564.

This irritated the Spanish who claimed Florida and opposed the Protestant settlers for religious reasons. In 1565, Pedro Menéndez de Avilés led a group of Spaniards and founded Saint Augustine, 60 kilometers south of Fort Caroline. Fearing a Spanish attack, Ribault planned to move the colony but a storm suddenly destroyed his fleet. On 20 September 1565 the Spaniards, commanded by Menéndez de Avilés, attacked and massacred all the Fort Caroline occupants including Jean Ribault.

=== Canada and Acadia ===
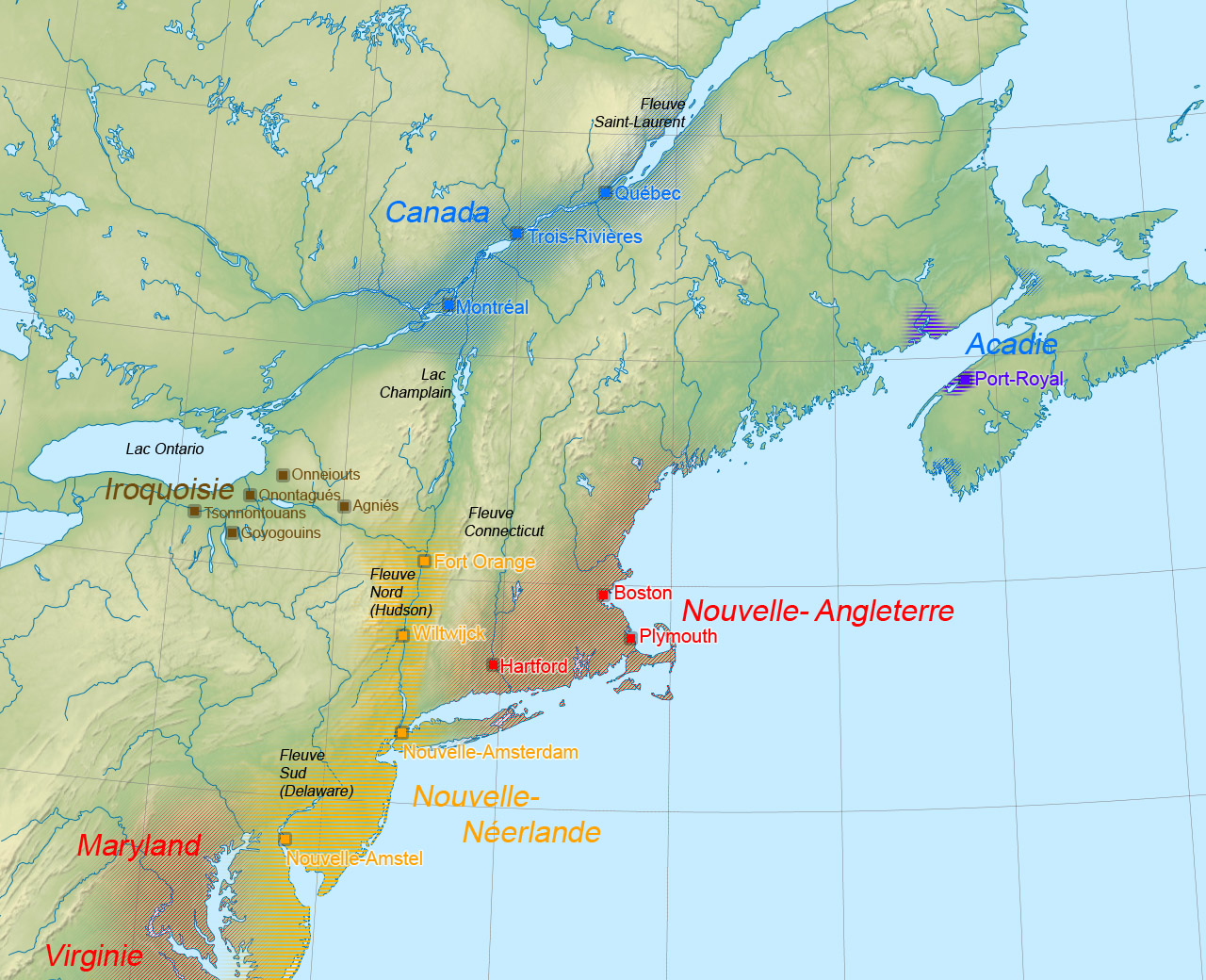
Political map of the Northeastern part of North America in 1664.

The French interest in Canada focused first on fishing off the Grand Banks of Newfoundland. However, at the beginning of the 17th century, France was more interested in fur from North America. The fur trading post of Tadoussac was founded in 1600. Four years later, Champlain made his first trip to Canada on a trade mission for fur. Although he had no formal mandate on this trip, he sketched a map of the St. Lawrence River and in writing, on his return to France, a report entitled Savages (relation of his stay with a tribe of Innu near Tadoussac).

Champlain needed to report his findings to Henry IV. He participated in another expedition to New France in the spring of 1604, conducted by Pierre Du Gua de Monts. It helped the foundation of a settlement on Saint Croix Island, the first French settlement in the New World, which would be given up the following winter. The expedition then founded the colony of Port-Royal.

In 1608, Champlain founded a fur post that would become the city of Quebec, which would become the capital of New France. In Quebec, Champlain forged alliances between France and the Wendat (Huron) and Odawa against their traditional enemies, the Haudenosaunee (Iroquois). Champlain and other French travelers then continued to explore North America, with canoes made from birch bark, to move quickly through the Great Lakes and their tributaries. In 1634, the Normand explorer Jean Nicolet pushed his exploration to the West up to Wisconsin.

Following the capitulation of Quebec by the Kirke brothers, the British occupied the city of Quebec and Canada from 1629 to 1632. Samuel de Champlain was taken prisoner and there followed the bankruptcy of the Company of One Hundred Associates. Following the Treaty of Saint-Germain-en-Laye, France took possession of the colony in 1632. The city of Trois-Rivières was founded in 1634. In 1642, the Angevin Jérôme le Royer de la Dauversière founded Ville-Marie (later Montreal) which was at that time, a fort as protection against Haudenosaunee attacks (the first great Haudenosaunee war lasted from 1642 to 1667).

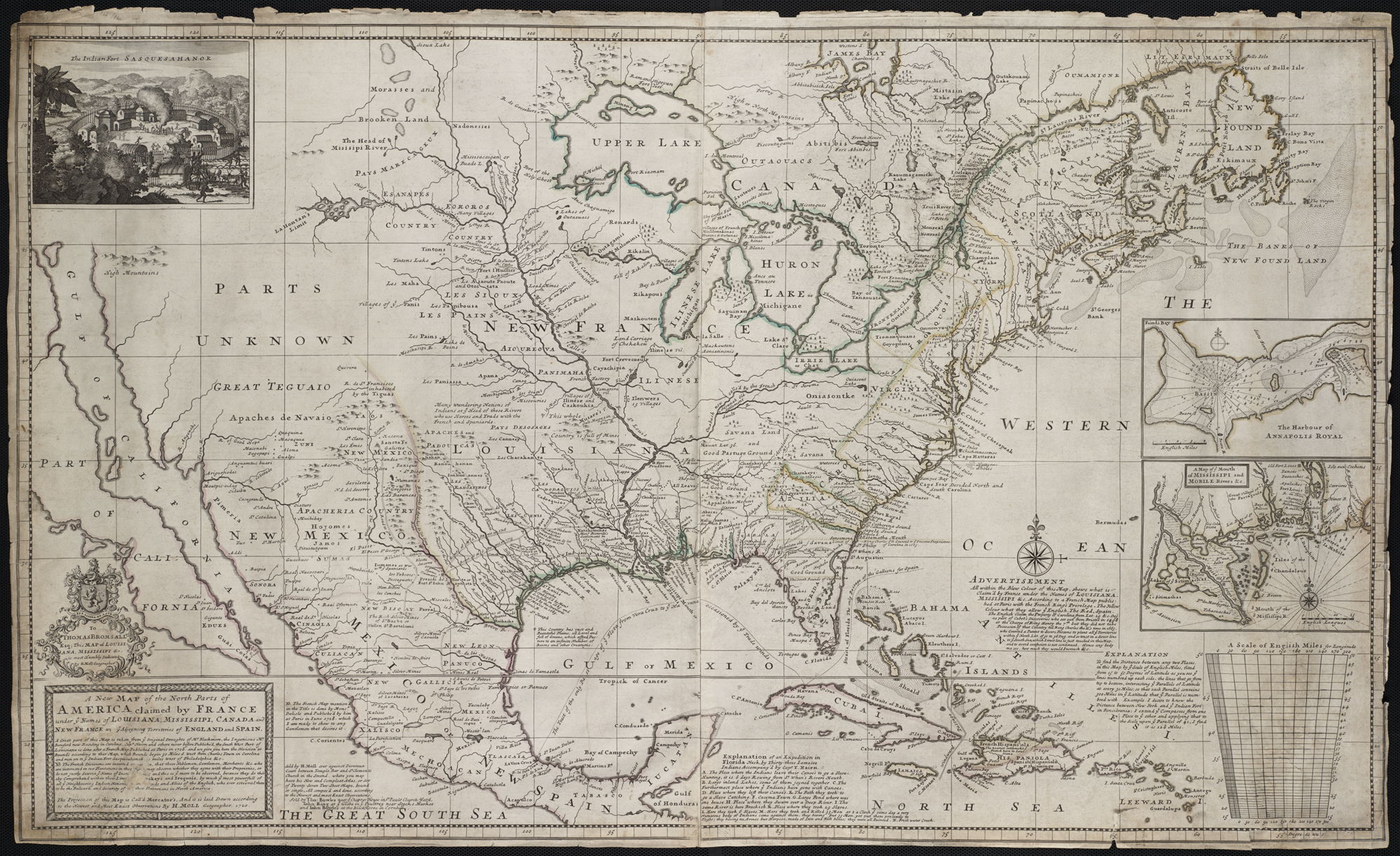
A map of North America claimed by France in 1720, according to the London cartographer Herman Moll.

Despite this rapid expansion, the colony developed very slowly. The Haudenosaunee wars and diseases were the leading causes of death in the French colony. In 1663 when Louis XIV provided the Royal Government, the population of New France was only 2,500 European inhabitants. That year, to increase the population, Louis XIV sent between 800 and 900 'King's Daughters' to become the wives of French settlers. The population of New France reached subsequently 7,000 in 1674 and 15,000 in 1689.

From 1689 to 1713, the French settlers were faced with almost incessant war during the French and Indian Wars. From 1689 to 1697, they fought the British in the Nine Years' War. The war against the Haudenosaunee continued even after the Treaty of Rijswijk until 1701, when the two parties agreed on peace. Then, the war against the English took over in the War of the Spanish Succession. In 1690 and 1711, Quebec City had successfully resisted the attacks of the English navy and then British army. Nevertheless, the British took advantage of the second war. With the signing of the Treaty of Utrecht in 1713, France ceded to Britain Acadia (with a population of 1,700 people), Newfoundland and Hudson Bay. Under the Sovereign Council, the population of the colony grew faster. However, the population growth was far inferior to that of the British Thirteen Colonies to the south. In the middle of the 18th century, New France accounted for 60,000 people while the British colonies had more than one million people. This placed the colony at a great military disadvantage against the British. The war between the colonies resumed in 1744, lasting until 1748. A final and decisive war began in 1754. The Canadiens and the French were helped by numerous alliances with Native Americans, but they were usually outnumbered on the battlefield.

=== Louisiana ===
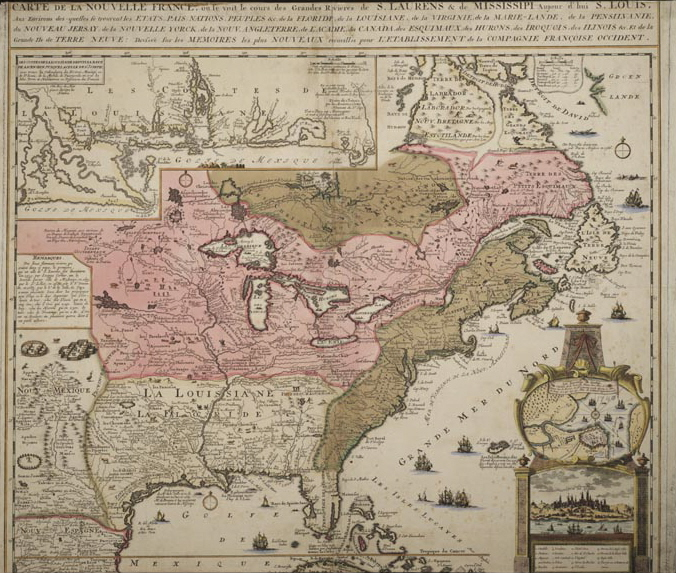
Lower Louisiana marked in yellow; pink represents Canada. Part of Canada below the great lakes was ceded to Louisiana in 1717. Brown represents British colonies. Original map from 1719

On May 17, 1673, explorers Louis Jolliet and Jacques Marquette began exploring the Mississippi River, known to the Sioux as does Tongo, or to the Miami-Illinois as missisipioui (the great river). They reached the mouth of the Arkansas and then up the river, after learning that it flowed into the Gulf of Mexico and not to the California Sea (Pacific Ocean).

In 1682, the Normand Cavelier de la Salle and the Italian Henri de Tonti came down the Mississippi to its Delta. They left from Fort Crevecoeur on the Illinois River, along with 23 French and 18 Native Americans. In April 1682, they arrived at the mouth of the Mississippi; they planted a cross and a column bearing the arms of the king of France. In 1686 de Tonti left 6 men near the Quapaw village of Osotouy, creating the settlement of Arkansas Post. De Tonti's Arkansas Post would be the first European settlement in the Lower Mississippi River valley. La Salle returned to France and won over the Secretary of State of the Navy to give him the command of Louisiana. He believed that it was close to New Spain by drawing a map on which the Mississippi seemed much further west than its actual rate. He set up a maritime expedition with four ships and 320 emigrants, but it ended in disaster when he failed to find the Mississippi Delta and was killed in 1687.

In 1698, Pierre LeMoyne d'Iberville left La Rochelle and explored the area around the mouth of the Mississippi. He stopped between Isle-aux-Chats (now Cat Island) and Isle Surgeres (renamed Isle-aux-Vascular or Ship Island) on February 13, 1699, and continued his explorations to the mainland, with his brother Jean-Baptiste Le Moyne de Bienville to Biloxi. He built a precarious fort, called 'Maurepas' (later 'Old Biloxi'), before returning to France. He returned twice in the Gulf of Mexico and established a fort at Mobile in 1702.

From 1699 to 1702, Pierre Le Moyne d'Iberville was governor of Louisiana. His brother succeeded him in that post from 1702 to 1713. He was again governor from 1716 to 1724 and again 1733 to 1743. In 1718, Jean-Baptiste Le Moyne de Bienville commanded a French expedition in Louisiana. He founded the city of New Orleans, in homage to Regent Duke of Orleans. The architect Adrian de Pauger drew the orthogonal plane of the Old Square.

==== Louisiana immigration ====
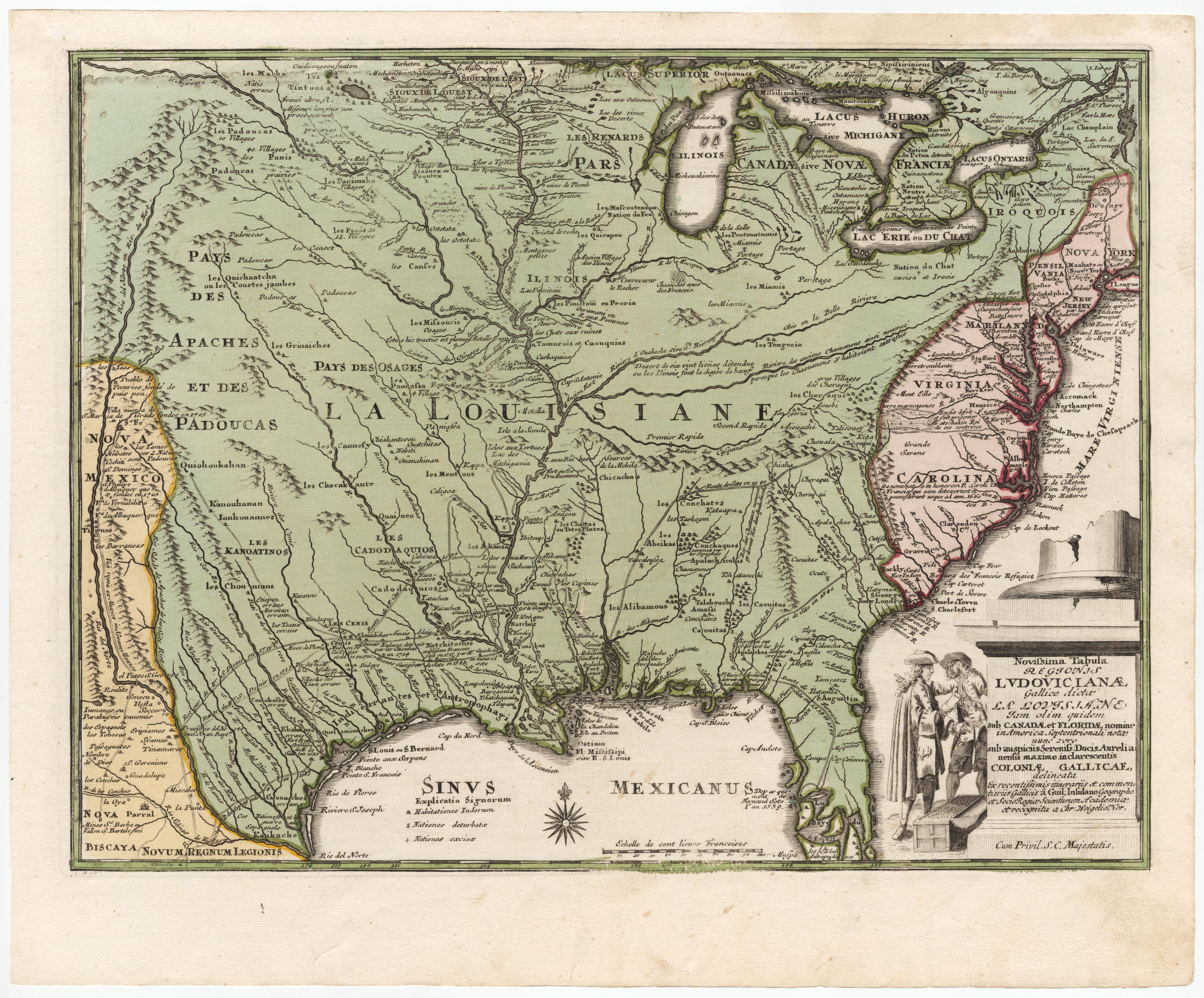
In Weigel's map (1719) intended to promote sales of the Mississippi Company in Germany; most of the present-day United States appears under the name "Louisiana".

In 1718, there were only 700 Europeans in Louisiana. The Mississippi Company arranged for ships to bring 800 more, who landed in Louisiana in 1718, doubling the European population. John Law encouraged Germans, particularly Germans of the Alsatian region who had recently fallen under French rule, and the Swiss to emigrate.

Prisoners were set free in Paris in September 1719 onwards, under the condition that they marry prostitutes and go with them to Louisiana. The newly married couples were chained together and taken to the port of embarkation. In May 1720, after complaints from the Mississippi Company and the concessioners about this class of French immigrants, the French government prohibited such deportations. However, there was a third shipment of prisoners in 1721.

The Mississippi Company arranged for hundreds of German immigrants to move to Louisiana by ships in 1721. Charles Frederick d'Arensbourg was a leader of the settlement called the German Coast. By the end of 1720, the Mississippi Company failed. Later, more Germans immigrated to Louisiana during the 1750s and 1770s.

=== Dissolution ===
The last French and Indian War resulted in the dissolution of New France in 1763, with Canada going to Great Britain and Louisiana going to Spain, although mainly absent. French colonists descendants or "Canadiens" that had settled in the Valley of Ohio, migrated into the Spanish territory West of the Mississippi and were instrumental in pushing further West toward the Pacific through their longer experience of the new continent and its native inhabitants. Only the islands of Saint-Pierre-et-Miquelon are still in French hands.

In 1802 Spain returned Louisiana to France, but Napoleon sold it to the United States in 1803. The French left many toponyms (Illinois, Vermont, Bayous) and ethnonyms (Sioux, Coeur d'Alene, Nez Percé) across North America.

== West Indies ==
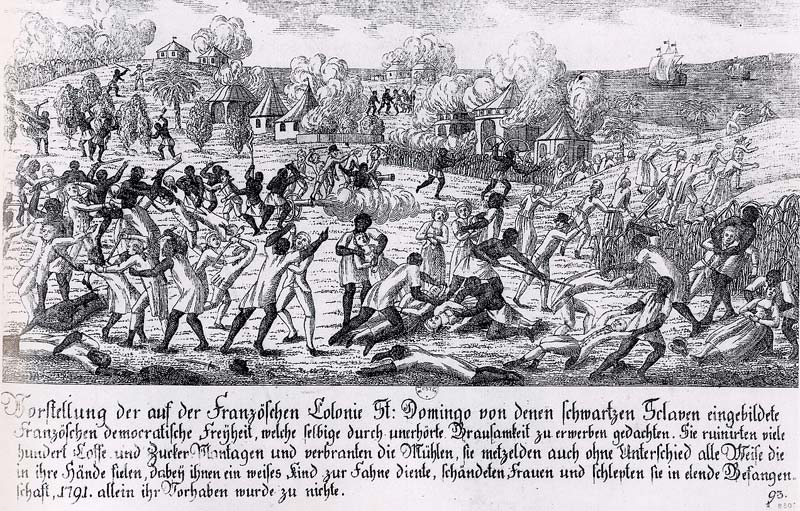
Saint-Domingue slave revolt in 1791

A major French settlement lay on the island of Hispaniola, where France established the colony of Saint-Domingue on the western third of the island in 1664. Nicknamed the "Pearl of the Antilles", Saint-Domingue became the richest colony in the Caribbean due to slave plantation production of sugar cane. It had the highest slave mortality rate in the western hemisphere. A 1791 slave revolt, the only ever successful slave revolt, began the Haitian Revolution, led to freedom for the colony's slaves in 1794 and, a decade later, complete independence for the country, which renamed itself Haiti. France briefly also ruled the eastern portion of the island, which is now the Dominican Republic.

During the 17th and 18th centuries, France ruled much of the Lesser Antilles at various times. Islands that came under French rule during part or all of this time include Dominica, Grenada, Guadeloupe, Marie-Galante, Martinique, St. Barthélemy, St. Croix, St. Kitts, St. Lucia, St. Martin, St. Vincent and Tobago. Control of many of these islands was contested between the French, the British and the Dutch; in the case of St. Martin, the island was divided in two, a situation that persists to this day. Great Britain captured some of France's islands during the Seven Years' War and the Napoleonic Wars. Following the latter conflict, France retained control of Guadeloupe, Martinique, Marie-Galante, St. Barthélemy, and its portion of St. Martin; all remain part of France today. Guadeloupe (including Marie-Galante and other nearby islands) and Martinique each is an overseas department of France, while St. Barthélemy and St. Martin each became an overseas collectivity of France in 2007.

== South America ==
=== 1. Brazil ===
France Antarctique (formerly also spelled France antartique) was a French colony south of the Equator, in Rio de Janeiro, Brazil, which existed between 1555 and 1567, and had control over the coast from Rio de Janeiro to Cabo Frio. The colony quickly became a haven for the Huguenots, and was ultimately destroyed by the Portuguese in 1567.

==== 1555 First settlement ====
On November 1, 1555, French vice-admiral Nicolas Durand de Villegaignon (1510–1575), a Catholic knight of the Order of Malta, who later would help the Huguenots to find a refuge against persecution, led a small fleet of two ships and 600 soldiers and colonists, and took possession of the small island of Serigipe in the Guanabara Bay, in front of present-day Rio de Janeiro, where they built a fort named Fort Coligny. The fort was named in honor of Gaspard de Coligny (then a Catholic statesman, who about a year later would become a Huguenot), an admiral who supported the expedition and would use the colony in order to protect his fellow believers. To the still largely undeveloped mainland village, Villegaignon gave the name of Henriville, in honour of Henry II, the King of France, who also knew of and approved the expedition, and had provided the fleet for the trip. Villegaignon secured his position by making an alliance with the Tamoio and Tupinambá Indians of the region, who were fighting the Portuguese.

==== 1557 Calvinist arrival ====
Unchallenged by the Portuguese, who initially took little notice of his landing, Villegaignon endeavoured to expand the colony by calling for more colonists in 1556. He sent one of his ships, the Grande Roberge, to Honfleur, entrusted with letters to King Henry II, Gaspard de Coligny and according to some accounts, the Protestant leader John Calvin.

After one ship was sent to France to ask for additional support, three ships were financed and prepared by the king of France and put under the command of Sieur De Bois le Comte, a nephew of Villegagnon. They were joined by 14 Calvinists from Geneva, led by Philippe de Corguilleray, including theologians Pierre Richier and Guillaume Chartrier. The new colonists, numbering around 300, included 5 young women to be wed, 10 boys to be trained as translators, as well as 14 Calvinists sent by Calvin, and also Jean de Léry, who would later write an account of the colony. They arrived in March 1557. The relief fleet was composed of:

1. The Petite Roberge, with 80 soldiers and sailors was led by Vice Admiral Sieur De Bois le Comte.
2. The Grande Roberge, with about 120 on board, captained by Sieur de Sainte-Marie dit l'Espine.
3. The Rosée, with about 90 people, led by Captain Rosée.

Doctrinal disputes arose between Villegagnon and the Calvinists, especially in relation to the Eucharist, and in October 1557 the Calvinists were banished from Coligny island as a result. They settled among the Tupinamba until January 1558, when some of them managed to return to France by ship together with Jean de Léry, and five others chose to return to Coligny island where three of them were drowned by Villegagnon for refusing to recant.

==== Portuguese intervention ====
In 1560 Mem de Sá, the new Governor-General of Brazil, received from the Portuguese government the command to expel the French. With a fleet of 26 warships and 2,000 soldiers, on 15 March 1560, he attacked and destroyed Fort Coligny within three days, but was unable to drive off their inhabitants and defenders, because they escaped to the mainland with the help of the Native Brazilians, where they continued to live and to work. Admiral Villegaignon had returned to France in 1558, disgusted with the religious tension that existed between French Protestants and Catholics, who had come also with the second group (see French Wars of Religion).
Urged by two influential Jesuit priests who had come to Brazil with Mem de Sá, named José de Anchieta and Manuel da Nóbrega, and who had played a big role in pacifying the Tamoios, Mem de Sá ordered his nephew, Estácio de Sá to assemble a new attack force. Estácio de Sá founded the city of Rio de Janeiro on March 1, 1565, and fought the Frenchmen for two more years. Helped by a military reinforcement sent by his uncle, on January 20, 1567, he imposed final defeat on the French forces and decisively expelled them from Brazil, but died a month later from wounds inflicted in the battle. Coligny's and Villegaignon's dream had lasted a mere 12 years.

=== 2. Equinoctial France ===
Equinoctial France was the contemporary name given to the colonization efforts of France in the 17th century in South America, around the line of Equator, before "tropical" had fully gained its modern meaning: Equinoctial means in Latin "of equal nights", i.e., on the Equator, where the duration of days and nights is nearly the same year round.
The French colonial empire in the New World also included New France (Nouvelle France) in North America, particularly in what is today the province of Quebec, Canada, and for a very short period (12 years) also Antarctic France (France Antarctique, in French), in present-day Rio de Janeiro, Brazil. All of these settlements were in violation of the papal bull of 1493, which divided the New World between Spain and Portugal. This division was later defined more exactly by the Treaty of Tordesillas.

==== History of France équinoxiale ====
French Guiana located in the South American continent.

France équinoxiale started in 1612, when a French expedition departed from Cancale, Brittany, France, under the command of Daniel de la Touche, Seigneur de la Ravardière, and François de Razilly, admiral. Carrying 500 colonists, it arrived in the Northern coast of what is today the Brazilian state of Maranhão. De la Ravardière had discovered the region in 1604 but the death of the king postponed his plans to start its colonization.
The colonists soon founded a village, which was named "Saint-Louis", in honor of the French king Louis IX. This later became São Luís in Portuguese,[1] the only Brazilian state capital founded by France. On 8 September, Capuchin friars prayed the first mass, and the soldiers started building a fortress. An important difference in relation to France Antarctique is that this new colony was not motivated by escape from religious persecutions to Protestants (see French Wars of Religion).
The colony did not last long. A Portuguese army assembled in the Captaincy of Pernambuco, under the command of Alexandre de Moura, was able to mount a military expedition, which defeated and expelled the French colonists in 1615, less than four years after their arrival in the land. Thus, it repeated the disaster spelt for the colonists of France Antarctique, in 1567. A few years later, in 1620, Portuguese and Brazilian colonists arrived in number and São Luís started to develop, with an economy based mostly in sugar cane and slavery.

French traders and colonists tried again to settle a France Équinoxiale further North, in what is today French Guiana, in 1626, 1635 (when the capital, Cayenne, was founded) and 1643. Twice a Compagnie de la France équinoxiale was founded, in 1643 and 1645, but both foundered as a result of misfortune and mismanagement. It was only after 1674, when the colony came under the direct control of the French crown and a competent Governor took office, that France Équinoxiale became a reality. To this day, French Guiana is a department of France.

== See also ==
- Atlantic World
- Canadian French
- Former colonies and territories in Canada
- Francization
- Franco-Indian alliance
- French and Indian Wars
- French colonial empire
- French in Canada
- French in the United States
- French intervention in Mexico
- French presence in the Ohio Valley
- French West Indies
- History of Canada
- List of French forts in North America
- List of French possessions and colonies
- Military of New France
- New France
- Decree of November 8, 1928
