= Battle of Blenheim order of battle =

Units and commanders of the 1704 battle

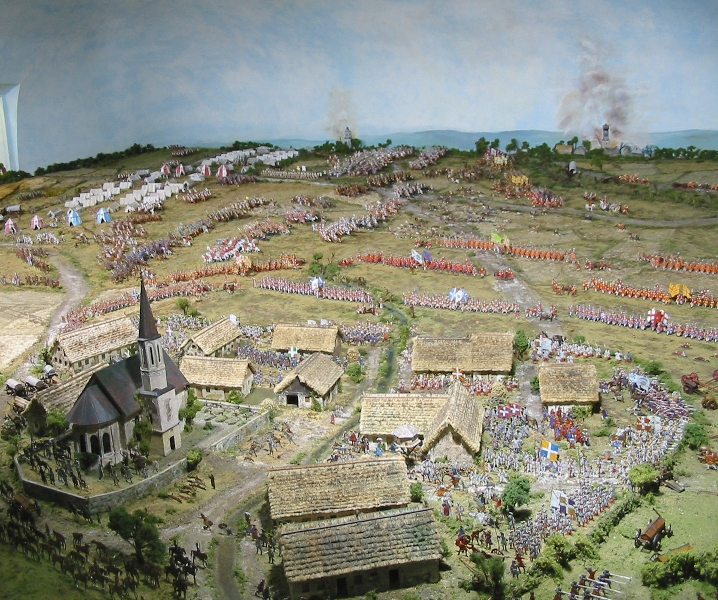
Diorama of the Battle of Blenheim on display in Höchstädt an der Donau, Germany.

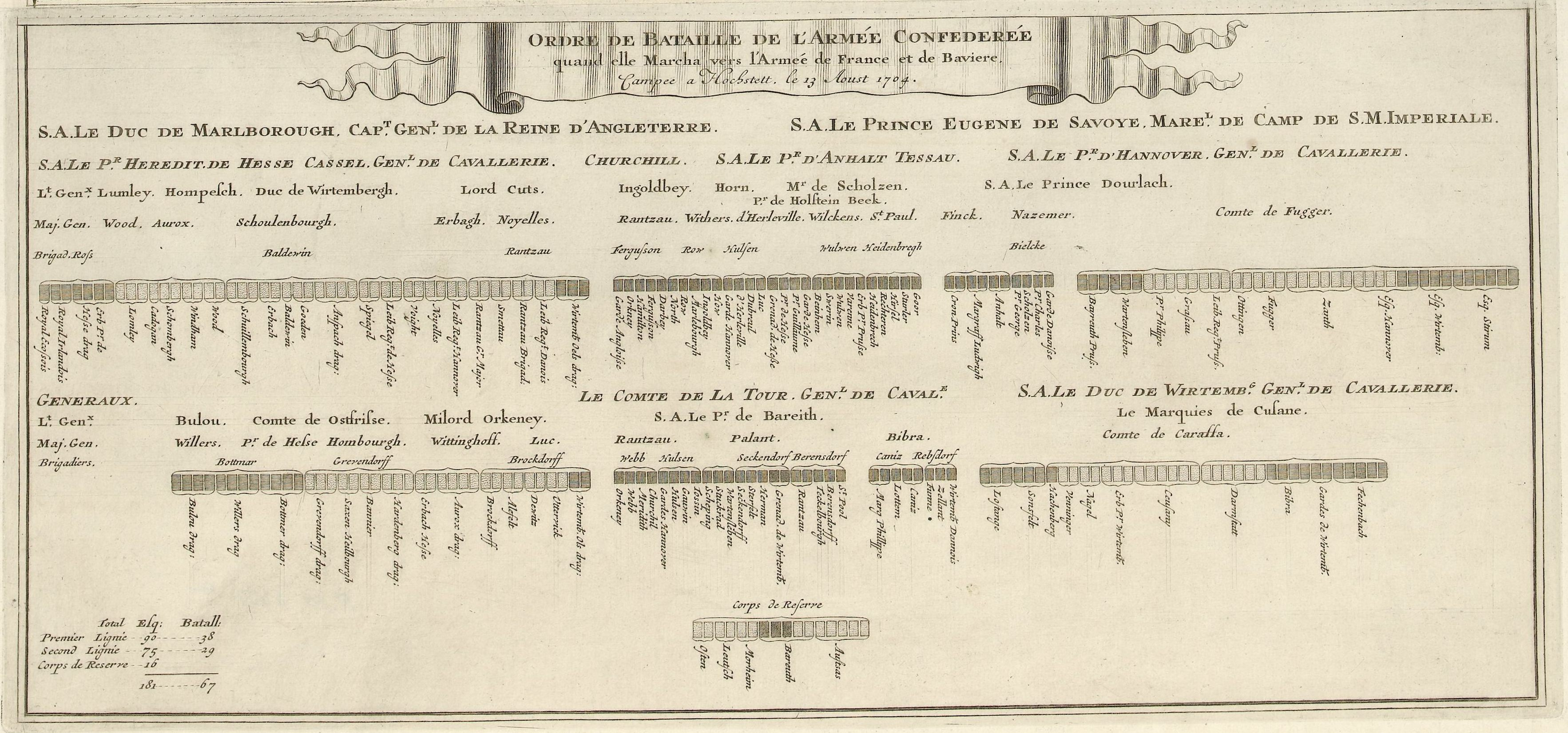
Order of Battle, Allied Army

The following units and commanders fought in the Battle of Blenheim during the War of the Spanish Succession on August 13, 1704.

== Allied Army ==
=== Staff ===
Captain General John Churchill, 1st Duke of Marlborough

Brigadier-General Thomas Meredyth (adjutant-general)
Brigadier-General William Cadogan (quartermaster-general)
Captain Alexander Spotswood (deputy quartermaster-general)
Francis Hare (chaplain-general)
Thomas Lawrence (physician-general)
Thomas Gardiner (surgeon-general)
Henry Watkins (deputy judge-advocate)
Colonel Giles Spencer (waggon-master-general)
Captain James Fury (provost-marshal-general)

- Unless otherwise noted, all infantry units are composed of one battalion.

=== Blenheim Column ===
Division	Brigade	Regiments and Others
Infantry; Lieutenant General John, Lord Cutts	Rowe's Brigade (England) Brigadier General Archibald Rowe	Howe's Regiment of Foot, Lieutenant-Colonel William Breton (584 men); The Welch Regiment of Fusiliers, Colonel Joseph Sabine (520 men); The Duke of Marlborough's Regiment of Foot, Colonel William Tatton (524 men); Scots Fusiliers (21st Foot), Colonel John Dalyell (629 men); Lord North and Grey's Regiment of Foot, Colonel William North, 6th Baron North & 2nd Baron Grey (580 men)
Infantry; Lieutenant General John, Lord Cutts	Wilkes' Brigade (Hesse-Kassel or Hesse-Cassel) Major General John Wilkes	Prinz Wilhelm Infantry Regiment (400 men); Erbprinz von Hessen-Kassel Infantry Regiment, Erbprinz Friedrich von Hessen-Kassel (400 men); Hessian Grenadiers Infantry Regiment (400 men); Hessian Guard (Leibregiment) Infantry Regiment (400 men); Wartensleben Infantry Regiment, Alexander Hermann, Graf von Wartensleben (400 men)
Infantry; Lieutenant General John, Lord Cutts	Ferguson's Brigade (Scotland) Brigadier General James Ferguson	Derby's Regiment of Foot, Lieutenant-Colonel Hans Hamilton (663 men); Ferguson's Regiment of Foot, Lieutenant-Colonel Alexander Livingstone (653 men); Royal Regiment of Ireland, Lieutenant-Colonel Robert Sterne (579 men); 2nd Battalion, His Majesty's Royal Regiment of Foot, Lieutenant-Colonel Andrew Hamilton (577 men); 1st Regiment of Foot Guards, Captain Gilbert Primrose (589 men)
Infantry; Lieutenant General John, Lord Cutts	St. Paul's Brigade Major General St. Paul (Includes Hulson's Brigade)	de Luc Infantry Regiment, Major General de Luc (Lüneburg-Celle) (400 men); de Breuil Infantry Regiment (Hanover) (Lüneburg-Celle) (400 men); Gauvin Infantry Regiment (Gauvin) (Hanover) (400 men); Hanoverian Guard Infantry Regiment (1/ Lüneburg-Celle, 2/ Hanover-Calenberg) (two battalions, 800 men)
Cavalry Support; Lieutenant General Henry Lumley	Palmes' Brigade (England) Brigadier General Francis Palmes	2nd/Wood's Regiment of Horse (4th Horse), Colonel John Featherstonhalgh (one squadron, 155 men); The King's Carabiniers (9th Horse), Major Philip Chenevix (two squadrons, 311 men); The Duke of Schomberg's Regiment of Horse (8th Horse), Colonel Charles Sybourg (two squadrons, 270 men)
Cavalry Support; Lieutenant General Henry Lumley	Wood's Brigade (England) Major General Cornelius Wood	The Queen's Regiment of Horse (2nd Horse), Lieutenant-Colonel Thomas Crowther (three squadrons, 482 men); 1st/Earl of Plymouth's Regiment of Horse (4th Horse), Major General Cornelius Wood (one squadron, 158 men); Lord Cadogan's Regiment of Horse (7th Horse), Major Robert Napier (one squadron, 149 men)
Cavalry Support; Lieutenant General Henry Lumley	Ross's Dragoon Brigade Major General Charles Ross (Includes Lord John Hay's Brigade)	Ross's Regiment of Dragoons (5th Dragoons), Lieutenant-Colonel Owen Wynne (England/Ireland) (two squadrons, 324 men); Grey Dragoons (2nd Dragoons), Lieutenant-Colonel George Preston (England/Scotland) (one squadron, 340 men); Erbprinz von Hessen-Kassel Dragoons, Erbprinz Friedrich von Hessen-Kassel (Hesse-Kassel) (four squadrons, 320 men)

=== Centre ===
Lieutenant General Charles Churchill

Division	Brigade	Regiments and Others
1st Line (Infantry); Lieutenant General Richard Ingoldsby	d'Herleville's Brigade Major General d'Herleville (Includes Stückrad's Brigade)	Schöpping Infantry Regiment (Hesse-Kassel) (400 men); Stückrad Infantry Regiment, Brigadier General Stückrad (Hesse-Kassel) (400 men); d'Herleville Infantry Regiment, Major General d'Herleville (Hanover-Calenberg) (400 men); von Tozin Infantry Regiment (Lüneburg-Celle) (400 men); Hulsen Infantry Regiment, Major General Hulsen (Hanover Calenberg) (400 men)
1st Line (Infantry); Lieutenant General Richard Ingoldsby	Württemberg Brigade Brigadier General Friederich Heinrich, Graf von Seckendorff	Württemberg Regiment Stenfels (571 men); Württemberg Regiment Hermann; Württemberg Grenadier Regiment (833 men); Seckendorff's Infantry Regiment (Anspach-Bayreuth), Brigadier General Friedrich Heinrich, Graf von Seckendorff (573 men)
1st Line (Infantry); Lieutenant General Horn	Holstein-Beck's Brigade Major General Anton Günther, Fürst von Holstein-Beck (Includes Heidebrecht's Brigade)	Heidebrecht Infantry Regiment, Brigadier General Heidebrecht (Ansbach/UP auxiliary) (599 men); Stürler Infantry Regiment (Swiss/UP auxiliary) (523 men); Hirzel Infantry Regiment (Swiss/UP auxiliary) (561 men); Rechteren Infantry Regiment (UP) (548 men); Goor Infantry Regiment (UP) (581 men)
1st Line (Infantry); Lieutenant General Horn	Dutch Mercenary Brigade Major General Johan van Pallandt	Bynheim Infantry Regiment (Pfalz /UP auxiliary) (571 men); Schwerin Infantry Regiment, Colonel Kurt Christof, Graf von Schwerin (Mecklenburg-Prussian Meith Regiment) (547 men); de Varenne Infantry Regiment, Jacques l'Aumonier, Marquis de Varenne (Prussia/UP auxiliary) (461 men); Wulffen Infantry Regiment (Prussia/UP auxiliary) (591 men); Erbprinz von Hessen-Kassel Infantry Regiment, Erbprinz von Hessen-Kassel (Prussia/UP auxiliary) (540 men)
Left-center (cavalry); Lieutenant General Cuno Josua von Bülow	Noyelles' Brigade Major General Jacques-Louis Comte de Noyelles and Falais	Leib Horse Cuirassier Regiment (Hanover-Calenberg) (two squadrons, 150 men); Voigt's Horse Cuirassier Regiment (Hanover-Calenberg) (two squadrons, 150 men); Noyelles' Horse Cuirassier Regiment, Major General Jacques-Louis, comte de Noyelles and Falais (Hanover-Calenberg-Osnabrück/UP auxiliary) (two squadrons, 150 men)
Left-center (cavalry); Lieutenant General Cuno Josua von Bülow	Viller's Brigade Major General Viller	von Bülow's Dragoons Regiment (Lieutenant General Cuno Josua von Bülow (Hanover-Calenberg) (three squadrons, 225 men); Viller's Dragoons (Lüneburg-Celle) (four squadrons, 320 men); Bothmer's Dragoons, Brigadier General Bothmer (Lüneburg-Celle) (four squadrons, 320 men)
2nd Line (cavalry); Lieutenant General Graf von Hompesch	Hesse-Homberg's Brigade Major General Friedrich, Prinz von Hessen-Homburg	Leib Horse Regiment (Hesse-Kassel/UP auxiliary) (two squadrons, 160 men); Spiegel's Karabinere (Hesse-Kassel/UP auxiliary) (two squadrons, 160 men)
2nd Line (cavalry); Lieutenant General Graf von Hompesch	Schulenburg's Brigade Major General Alexander von der Schulenburg	Schulenburg's Dragoons (Hanover-Calenberg) (two squadrons, 150 men); Breidenbach's Horse Regiment (Hanover-Calenberg & Lüneburg-Celle) (two squadrons, 160 men)
2nd Line (cavalry); Lieutenant General Graf von Hompesch	Erbach's Brigade Major General Erbach	Erbach's Horse Cuirassier Regiment, Major General Erbach (UP) (two squadrons, 200 men); Baldwin's Horse, Brigadier General Baldwin (UP) (one squadron, 100 men); Schmettau's Dragoons, Gottlieb Schmettau (Ansbach) (four squadrons, 400 men)
Cavalry; Lieutenant General Friedrich Ulrich, comte de Oostfries	Vittinghoff's Brigade Lieutenant General Vittinghoff	Grevendorff's Dragoons, Brigadier General Grevendorff (Saxe-Gotha) (three squadrons, 240 men); Hardenberg's Dragoons (Saxe-Gotha) (three squadrons, 240 men); Sachsen-Heilburg Horse Regiment (UP) (two squadrons, 200 men); Bannier's Horse Regiment (Hanover-Calenberg) (two squadrons, 150 men)
Cavalry; Lieutenant General Friedrich Ulrich, comte de Oostfries	Auroch's Brigade Major General Auroch	Erbach's Horse Regiment, Major General Erbach (Hesse-Kassel) (two squadrons, 160 men); Auroch's Dragoons, Major General Auroch (Hesse-Kassel) (four squadrons, 320 men)
Lieutenant General Karl Rudolf, Fürst von Württemberg-Neuenstadt	Rantzau's Brigade (Denmark/UP auxiliary) Brigadier General Jørgen von Rantzau	2nd Sjællandske Horse Regiment, Brigadier General Jørgen von Rantzau (two squadrons, 585 men; 5th Jydske Regiment of Horse, Colonel Wilhelm von Schmettau (two squadrons, 440 men); 4th Jydske Regiment of Horse, Brigadier General Jørgen von Rantzau (two squadrons, 440 men); Livregimentet Rytter, Colonel Christian Detlev von Reventlow (two squadrons of six companies, 556 men); Württemberg-Öls Dragoons, Carl Friedrich, Herzog von Württemberg-Öls (three squadrons of ten companies, 1,007 men)
Lieutenant General Karl Rudolf, Fürst von Württemberg-Neuenstadt	Brockdorff's Brigade (Denmark/England auxiliary) Brigadier General Ditlev von Brockdorff	3rd Jydske Horse Regiment, Colonel Ditlev von Brockdroff (two squadrons, 591 men); Ahlefeldt's Horse Cuirassier Regiment (two squadrons, 589 men); 2nd Jydske Horse Regiment, Colonel von Uterwick Prehn (two squadrons, 568 men); Holstein's Horse Cuirassier Regiment, Colonel Dewitz (two squadrons, 578 men); Württemberg-Ōls Dragoons, Carl Friedrich, Herzog von Württemberg-Ōls (two squadrons of ten companies, 589 men)
Lieutenant General Karl Rudolf, Fürst von Württemberg-Neuenstadt	von Rantzau's Brigade Major General Jørgen von Rantzau	1st Battalion, Rantzau, Major General Jørgen von Rantzau (Lüneburg-Celle/UP auxiliary) (588 men); 2nd Battalion, Rantzau, Major General Jørgen von Rantzau (Lüneburg-Celle/UP auxiliary) (636 men); Bernsdorff Infantry Regiment, Brigadier General Bernsdorff (Lüneburg-Celle/UP auxiliary) (531 men); Teckelenberg Infantry Regiment (Hanover-Calenberg/UP auxiliary) (532 men); St. Paul Infantry Regiment, St. Paul des Estanges (Hanover-Calenberg/UP auxiliary) (520 men)
Infantry; Lieutenant General Lord Orkney	Webb's Brigade Major General John Richmond Webb	Churchill's Regiment of Foot, Colonel Henry Peyton (590 men); Thomas Meredyth's Regiment of Foot, Lieutenant-Colonel Thomas Bellew (575 men); The Queen's Regiment of Foot, Lieutenant-Colonel Richard Sutton (739 men); 1st/His Majesty's Royal Regiment of Foot, Colonel John White (639 men)

=== Right, Army of Imperial Austria ===
Field Marshal Prince François Eugène von Savoy-Carignan

Division	Brigade	Regiments and Others
Cavalry; General of the imperial cavalry Maximilian, Prinz von Braunschweig und Lüneburg	Natzmer's Brigade (Prussia) Major General Dubislav Gneomar von Natzmer auf Gannewitz	Leib Dragoons (three squadrons, 360 men), Colonel Ludwig von Blumenthal, succeeded by Lt-Colonel von Hacke after colonel's death in the battle.; Margraf Philip's Horse Cuirassier Regiment, Major General Philip Wilhelm, Margraf von Brandenburg-Schwedt (three squadrons, 300 men); Wartensleben Horse Regiment (three squadrons, 300 men); Bayreuth-Kulmbach Horse Cuirassier Regiment, Colonel Christian Heinrich, Margraf von Bayreuth-Kulmbach (three squadrons, 300 men); von Krassow's Dragoons, Ernst Detlev von Krassow (two dragoons, 160 men)
Cavalry; General of the imperial cavalry Maximilian, Prinz von Braunschweig und Lüneburg	Fugger's Brigade (Austria) Major General Graf von Fugger	Alt-Hanover Cuirassiers (six squadrons, 500 men); Lobkowicz's Cuirassiers (six squadrons, 500 men)
Cavalry; General of the imperial cavalry Maximilian, Prinz von Braunschweig und Lüneburg	Durlach's Brigade Field Marshal Friedrich, Margraf von Baden-Durlach	Limburg-Styrum's Dragoons (Austria) (six squadrons, 500 men); Württemberg Independent Cavalry (Leib Dragoon) (Württemberg) (three squadrons, 240 men); Fugger's Cavalry, Major General Graf von Fugger (Swabia) (three squadrons, 240 men); Öttingen's Dragoons, Albrecht Ernst II, Fürst von Öttingen (Swabia) (two squadrons, 160 men)
Cavalry; General of cavalry Eberhard Louis, Herzog von Württemberg-Teck	l'Ostange's Brigade Major General Charles Graf de l'Ostange	Sonsfeld's Dragoons (three squadrons, 300 men); l'Ostange's Horse Cuirassier Regiment, Major General Charles, Graf de l'Ostange (three squadrons, 300 men)
Cavalry; General of cavalry Eberhard Louis, Herzog von Württemberg-Teck	Bibra's Brigade Major General Christoph Erhard von Bibra:	Helmstaett Horse Cuirassier Regiment, Erbprinz Helmstaett von Württemberg (Swabia) (three squadrons, 240 men); Nagel's Karabinere (Münster/UP auxiliary) (two squadrons, 200 men); Vennigen's Karabinere, George Friedrich von Vennigen (Palatine/UP auxiliary) (two squadrons, 300 men); Hachenberg's Cuirassiers (Niederrhein) (one squadron, 80 men)
Cavalry; General of cavalry Eberhard Louis, Herzog von Württemberg-Teck	Cusani's Brigade (Austria) Field Marshal Marquis de Cusani	Darmstadt's Imperial Cuirassiers (six squadrons, 600 men); Cusani's Imperial Cuirassiers (six squadrons, 600 men)
Cavalry; General of cavalry Eberhard Louis, Herzog von Württemberg-Teck	Caraffa's Brigade Major General von Caraffa	Fechenbach's Dragoons, Freiherr von Fechenbach (Würzburg/Mainz) (four squadrons, 400 men); Württemberg Leibgarde (Württemberg) (two squadrons, 160 men); Bibra's Dragoons, Major General von Bibra (Mainz/Austrian auxiliary) (four squadrons, 400 men)
Cavalry Reserve; General of Cavalry Charles Maximilien, comte de la Tour et Valsassina	Efferen's Brigade	Moorheim's Cuirassiers (Mecklenburg) (two squadrons, 160 men); Leutsch's Cuirssiers (Saxe-Gotha) (two squadrons, 160 men); von der Ostheim's Horse Cuirassier Regiment (Holstein-Gottorp) (two squadrons, 160 men)
Cavalry Reserve; General of Cavalry Charles Maximilien, comte de la Tour et Valsassina	Bayreuth's Brigade (Franconia) Field Marshal Christian Ernst, Margraf von Brandenburg-Bayreuth	Auffess' Dragoons (five squadrons, 400 men); Bayreuth's Cuirassiers (five squadrons, 400 men)
Feldzeugmeister Leopold, Fürst von Anhalt-Dessau	Finck's Brigade (Prussia) Major General Albrecht Conrad Graf Finck v. Finckenstein	Grenadier Garde, Kurprinz Friedrich Wilhelm I (two battalions, 800 men); Margraf Ludwig's Infantry Regiment, Christian Ludwig, Margraf von Brandenburg-Schwedt (two battalions, 800 men); Anhalt-Dessau Infantry Regiment, Leopold, Fürst von Anhalt-Dessau (two battalions, 800 men)
Feldzeugmeister Leopold, Fürst von Anhalt-Dessau	Canitz' Brigade (Prussia) Major General Christopher Albrecht von Canitz	Margraf Phillip's Infantry Regiment, Phillip Wilhelm, Margraf von Brandenburg-Schwedt (two battalions, 800 men); Leibgarde, Colonel Carl Philipp Freiherr von Wylich zu Lottum (one battalion, 400 men); Canitz's Infantry Regiment, Major General Christopher Albrecht von Canitz (two battalions, 800 men)
Lieutenant General Jobst von Scholten	Bielke's Brigade (Denmark/Austria auxiliary) Brigadier General Christoffer Bielke	1st Battalion, Regiment of Foot Prince George, Karl Rudolf, Fürst von Württemberg-Neuenstadt (one battalion, 824 men); 2nd Battalion, Regiment of Foot Prince Carl, Lieutenant General Jobst Scholten (one battalion, 627 men); Regiment Dansk Den Kongelige Livgarde til fods (one battalion, 740 men); 2nd Battalion, Regiment of Foot Prince George, Karl Rudolf, Fürst von Württemberg-Neuenstadt (one battalion, 704 men)
Lieutenant General Jobst von Scholten	Rebsdorff's Brigade (Denmark/England and UP auxiliary) Brigadier General Rebsdorff	1st Battalion, Fynske Regiment of Foot, Brigadier General Schonenfeldt (one battalion, 860 men); 2nd Battalion, Sjællandske Regiment of Foot (one battalion, 620 men); Regiment of Foot Christian Ulrich, Colonel Bonart (one battalion, 702 men)
	Artillery Colonel Holcroft Blood	Three batteries of ten sakers; One battery of four howitzers; One battery of six demi-culverin; One battery of twenty-four 3-pounders; One battery of sixteen 3-pounders

== Franco-Bavarian Army ==
Camille d'Hostun de la Baume, Duc de Tallard, Marshal of France

=== Blenheim Wing Command ===
Lieutenant General Philippe, Marquis de Clérambault

Maréchal de Camp, the Marquis de Blansac

Division	Brigade	Regiments and Others
Dismounted Dragoons	Hautefeulle's Brigade	Mestre de Camp Général (three squadrons, 338 men); La Reine's Dragoons (three squadrons, 231 men); Rohan-Chabot's Dragoons (three squadrons, 330 men); Vasse's Dragoons (three squadrons, 327 men)
Blenheim Garrison	de Maulevrier's Brigade Marquis de Maulevrier	Regiment de Navarre (three battalions, 1,500 men)
Blenheim Garrison	Balincourt's Brigade Claude Guillaume Testu de Balincourt	Régiment d'Artois (two battalions, 1,000 men); 1st/Provence (one battalion, 500 men)
Blenheim Garrison	Greder's Brigade Marquis de Greder	Regiment de Greder Allemande (German) (two battalions, 1,000 men); Regiment de Lassay (one battalion, 500 men)
Blenheim Reserve	d'Argelos' Brigade Baron d'Argelos	Régiment de Languedoc (two battalions, 1,000 men); Regiment de Santerre (two battalions, 1,000 men)
Blenheim Reserve	St. Segond's Brigade Marquis de St. Segond	Regiment de Zurlauben (Walloons) (two battalions, 1,000 men); St. Segond (Italy) (one battalion, 500 men)
Infantry Reserve; Lieutenant General the Marquis de Marinvaux	Montroux's Brigade Marquis de Montroux	Regiment de Montroux (Italy) (one battalion, 500 men); Regiment de Aunis (two battalions, 1,000 men)
Infantry Reserve; Lieutenant General the Marquis de Marinvaux	Monfort's Brigade Marquis de Montfort	Regiment de Montfort (Walloon/Spanish auxiliary) (two battalions, 1,200 men); Blaisois (one battalion, 500 men)
Infantry Reserve; Lieutenant General the Marquis de Marinvaux	d'Enonville's Brigade Comte d'Enonville	Royal (three battalions, 1,500 men); Regiment de Boulonnais (two battalions, 1,000 men)

=== Between Blenheim and Oberglauheim ===
Marquis de Montpeyroux

Division	Brigade	Regiments and Others
Lieutenant General Beat Jacques II de Zurlauben, comte de Zurlauben	Vertilly's Brigade Marquis de Vertilly	Gendarmerie de France (eight squadrons, 1,500 men)
Lieutenant General Beat Jacques II de Zurlauben, comte de Zurlauben	Broglie's Brigade Marquis de Broglie	Regiment du Roi (three squadrons, 423 men); Regiment de Tarneau (two squadrons, 184 men); Regiment de la Baume (two squadrons, 282 men)
	Grignan's Brigade Marquis de Grignan	Mestre de Camp General (three squadrons, 255 men); Regiment de Grignan (three squadrons, 312 men)
Marechal de Camp, the Duc d'Humeries	Merode-Westerloo's Brigade (Spain) Comte de Merode-Westerloo	Regimiento de Gaetano (two squadrons, 214 men); Regimiento de Acosta (two squadrons, 200 men); Regimiento de Heider (two squadrons, 200 men)
Marechal de Camp, the Duc d'Humeries	la Valliere's Brigade Marquis de la Valliere	Régiment de Bourgogne (three squadrons, 360 men); Regiment de la Valliere (two squadrons, 136 men); Regiment de Noailles (two squadrons, 200 men); Regiment de Beringhen (three squadrons, 783 men)
Marechal de Camp, the Duc d'Humeries	Silly's Brigade Marquis de Silly	Regiment de Orleans (three squadrons, 165 men); Regiment de Montreval (two squadrons, 110 men); Regiment de St. Pouanges (two squadrons, 100 men); Regiment de Ligonday (two squadrons, 100 men)
Marechal de Camp, the Marquis de St. Pierre	Trecesson's Brigade Marquis de Trecesson	Regiment de Robecque (Wallon) (two battalions, 1,000 men); Regiment de d'Albaret (one battalion, 500 men)
Marechal de Camp, the Marquis de St. Pierre	Breuil's Brigade Marquis de Breuil	Regiment de Auxerrois (two battalions, 1,000 men); Regiment de Chabrillant (one battalion, 500 men)
Marechal de Camp, the Marquis de St. Pierre	Belleisle's Brigade Marquis de Belleisle	Regiment de Nice (one battalion, 500 men); Regiment de Tavannes (one battalion, 500 men); Regiment de Bandeville (one battalion, 500 men)

== The Army of the Elector of Bavaria ==
Prince Maximillian II Emmanuel Wittelsbach, Elector of Bavaria
Second in command: Marshal Ferdinand de Marsin

=== Marquis du Bourg's Corps ===
Lieutenant General the Marquis du Bourg

Division	Brigade	Regiments and Others
1st Cavalry Line	Massenbach's Brigade	Regiment de Royal (three squadrons, 360 men); Regiment de La Ferronnaye (two squadrons, 240 men); Regiment de Levy (two squadrons, 240 men)
1st Cavalry Line	Prince Charles de Lorraine's Brigade	Regiment de Prince Charles de Lorraine (two squadrons, 240 men); Regiment de Choiseul (two squadrons, 240 men)
2nd Cavalry Line	d'Anlezy's Brigade	Regiment d'Anlezy (two squadrons, 240 men); Regiment de Livry (two squadrons, 240 men); Regiment de Heudincourt (two squadrons, 240 men); Regiment de Dauphin Etranger (three squadrons, 360 men)

=== Marquis de Blainville's Corps ===
Lieutenant General Jean-Jules-Armand Colbert, Marquis de Blainville

Division	Brigade	Regiments and Others
Marechal de Camp William Dorrington	Blingy's Brigade Marquis de Bligny	Regiment de Champagne (three battalions, 1,500 men); 1st Saintonge (one battalion, 500 men)
Marechal de Camp William Dorrington	Nangis' Brigade Louis Armand de Brinchanteau de Nangis	Bourbonnais (two battalions, 1,000 men); 1st Foix (one battalion, 500 men); 1st Agenois (one battalion, 500 men)

=== Marquis de Rosel's Corps ===
Lieutenant General the Marquis de Rosel

Division	Brigade	Regiments and Others
Oberglauheim support	Buzancois' Brigade Marquis de Buzancois	Régiment de la Reine (three battalions, 1,500 men)
Oberglauheim support	Clare's Brigade (Ireland) Charles O'Brien, 5th Viscount Clare	Dorrington's Regiment (one battalion, 500 men); Clare's Regiment (one battalion, 500 men); Lee's Regiment (one battalion, 500 men)
Oberglauheim support	Coetquen's Brigade	Regiment de Coietquen (two battalions, 1,000 men); 1st Chartres (one battalion, 500 men)
Oberglauheim support	Prince d'Isenghein	1st Poitou (one battalion, 500 men); 1st Guyenne (one battalion, 500 men); Regiment d'Isenghein (Walloon) (one battalion, 500 men); Regiment de Beauferme (two battalions, 1,000 men)

=== Count d'Arco's Corps ===
Field Marshal Johann Baptist, Count d'Arco

Division	Brigade	Regiments and Others
Lieutenant General the Marquis de Magnac	Montmain's Brigade	Regiment de Conde (two squadrons, 240 men); Regiment de Montmain (two squadrons, 240 men); Regiment de Bourck (Ireland) (two squadrons, 240 men)
Lieutenant General the Marquis de Magnac	Vivan's Brigade	Regiment de Abusson (two squadrons, 240 men); Regiment de Vivans (two squadrons, 240 men); Regiment de Fourquevaux (two squadrons, 240 men)
Lieutenant General the Marquis de Legall	Barentin's Brigade	Regiment de Barentin (two squadrons, 240 men); Regiment de la Billarderie (two squadrons, 240 men); Regiment de Bissy (two squadrons, 240 men)
Lieutenant General the Marquis de Legall	Vigiers Brigade	Regiment de Royal Piedmont (three squadrons, 360 men); Regiment du Vigier (two squadrons, 240 men); Regiment de Merinville (two squadrons, 240 men)
Bavarian Cavalry	von Weickel's Brigade	d'Arco's Cuirassiers (six squadrons, 720 men); Weickel's Cuirassiers (four squadrons, 480 men); Garde Karabinere (one squadron, 120 men); Grenadiers a Cheval Horse Grenadiers (one squadron, 120 men); Locatelli's Hussars Leib Company (one squadron, 120 men)
Bavarian Cavalry	von Wolframsdorff's Brigade	Torring-Seefeld's Dragoons (two squadrons, 240 men); von Wolframsdorff's Cuirassiers (six squadrons, 720 men); de Costa's Cuirassiers (six squadrons, 720 men)
Major General Alessandro Marquis de Maffei	de Maffei's Brigade	Regiment de Maffei (one battalion, 500 men); Kurprinz Regiment (one battalion, 500 men); Leibgarde Fusiliers Regiment (two battalions, 1,000 men); Leibgarde Grenadiers Regiment (one battalion, 500 men); Regiment d'Ocfort (one battalion, 500 men)
Major General Alessandro Marquis de Maffei	Mercy's Brigade	Regiment de Mercy (two battalions, 1,000 men); Regiment de Tattenbach (one battalion, 500 men); Regiment von Karthausen (one battalion, 500 men); Regiment von Spilburg (one battalion, 500 men)
Lieutenant General the Comte de Dreux	Fontbeausard's Dragoon Brigade	Regiment de Listenois (three squadrons, 360 men); Regiment de la Vrilliere (three squadrons, 360 men); Regiment de Fontbeausard (three squadrons, 360 men)
Lieutenant General the Comte de Dreux	Conflans' Brigade	Regiment de Conflans (two squadrons, 240 men); Regiment de Rouvray (two squadrons, 240 men)
Lieutenant General the Marquis de Sauffrey	Montbron's Brigade Marquis de Montron	Regiment de Dauphin (three battalions, 1,500 men); 1st Conde (one battalion, 500 men); Regiment de Montboissier (one battalion, 500 men)
Lieutenant General the Marquis de Sauffrey	Tourouvre's Brigade Chevalier de Tourouvre	Regiment de Lorraine (one battalion, 500 men); Regiment de Toulouse (two battalions, 1,000 men)
Lieutenant General the Marquis de Sauffrey	Montmorency's Brigade Chavalier de Montmorency	1st Béarn (one battalion, 500 men); 1st Bourbon (one battalion, 500 men); 1st Nivernais (one battalion, 500 men); 1st Vermandois (one battalion, 500 men)
Artillery	Royal Artillery Marquis de Frezeliere	One battery of eight 8-pounders; Five batteries of four 4-pounders; One battery of four 24-pounders
Artillery	Royal Artillery Marquis de Houville	Four batteries of four 8-pounders; Three batteries of four 12-pounders; One battery of six 16-pounders; One battery of two 24-pounders
Artillery	Additional	twenty-two 4-pounders distributed along the front.

== Sources ==
- Higgins, David R. "Tactical File: The Famous Victory: Blenheim, 13 August 1704." Strategy & Tactics, Number 238 (September 2006).
