= Guillaume Chartier =

Guillaume Chartier may refer to:

- Guillaume Chartier (bishop) (died 1 May 1472), French bishop
- Guillaume Chartier (theologian) (fl. 1555–1560), Swiss theologian and Protestant pastor
