= Royal Regiment =

The Royal Regiment might refer to

- The Duke of Edinburgh's Royal Regiment
- The King's Royal Regiment of New York
- The Princess of Wales's Royal Regiment
- The Royal Regiment (France)
- The Royal 22nd Regiment
- The Royal Australian Regiment
- The Royal Regiment of Artillery
- The Royal Regiment of Australian Artillery
- The Royal Regiment of Canada
- The Royal Regiment of Canadian Artillery
- The Royal Regiment of Fusiliers
- The Royal Regiment of New Zealand Artillery
- The Royal Regiment of Scotland
- The Royal Regiment of Wales
- The Royal Regiment (The Royal Scots)
