= Guillaume Chartier (theologian) =

Guillaume Chartier was a Calvinist theologian and Protestant pastor from Geneva, active between 1555 and 1560.

== Mission to France Antarctique ==
He was a young theologian in Geneva when he was chosen by John Calvin to take part in an expedition organized by the French gentleman Philippe de Corguilleray, who had been asked by Gaspard de Coligny to come to the aid of admiral Nicolas Durand de Villegagnon, who was asking for assistance in increasing the population of the small French colony at Fort Coligny in France Antarctique in what is now Brazil. His mission was to convert Catholics in the French colony and support the Huguenot colonists in their faith. He was accompanied by the 50-year-old pastor Pierre Richier.

The expedition was financed by de Coligny and Villegagnon and included Philippe de Corguilleray, the two pastors and Jean de Léry – de Léry later wrote an account of the voyage. Fifteen people in total travelled from Geneva to Le Havre to embark, where they were met by three hundred Protestant emigrants. They set sail on 19 November 1556 and arrived in Guanabara Bay on 7 March the following year. The emigrants disembarked on île de Coligny, where they built fort Coligny.

Villagagnon and Corguilleray soon fell out, with the latter contesting his authority and leading the Huguenots against the French Catholics in Fort Coligny. Pierre Richier opposed Villegagnon's religious vision (for Villegagnon "the body and blood of Christ are really enclosed in the bread and wine"), backing instead a more symbolic interpretation of the eucharist. Chartier left for Europe and visited Calvin and the German Protestants to consult them about controversial points and polemics which opposed the believers of France Antarctique.
