= Charles de Clermont =

Protestant preacher (fl. 1557)

Charles de Clermont, called la Fontaine, was a Protestant preacher who was active in La Rochelle in 1557.

The arrival of Charles de Clermont followed a period of repression against Calvinist propagation, through the establishment of "Cours présidiaux" tribunals by Henry II. An early result was the burning at the stake of two "heretics" in front of the Church of Notre-Dame de Cougne in 1552. Conversions to Calvinism however continued, due to religious beliefs, but also to a desire for political independence on the part of the local elite, and a popular opposition to royal expenses and requisitions in the building projects to fortify the coast against the English.

Charles de Clermont was the first to give cohesion to the Reformation movement in La Rochelle, which only consisted in a few isolated elements, with no Pastor or Temple, when he arrived in the city. He was assisted by Jean de la Place, and it was in 1557 that "the truth of the Gospel began to be exercised in the right". Charles de Clermont founded a group of about 50 souls that met in clandestinity.

Charles de Clermont was succeeded in 1558 by Pierre Richier returning from Brazil, who organized the congregation. He became the first Pastor of La Rochelle and is considered as "the Father of the Church of La Rochelle".
