= Bourgogne Regiment =

French Royal Army regiment

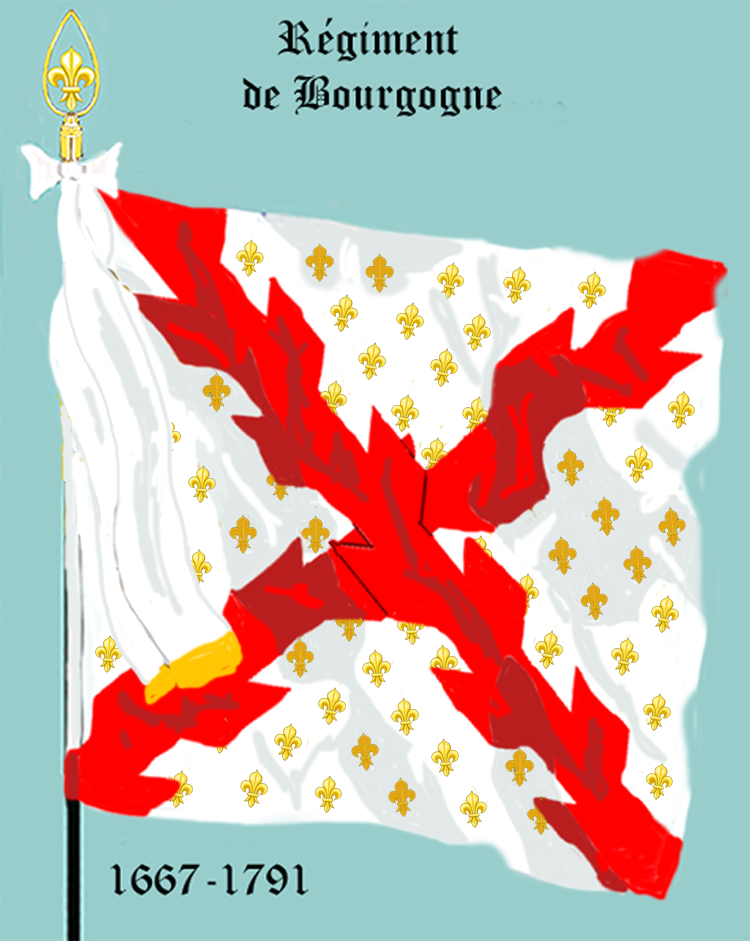
The colours of the Bourgogne Regiment

The Bourgogne Regiment was a French Royal Army regiment established in 1665 and disbanded in 1791. Formed by Ancien Régime officials on 7 December 1665 as one of 37 new line infantry regiments created in response to King Philip IV of Spain's death, the regiment was intended to be used by France to fight a planned war against the Spanish Empire. In 1667 and 1668, the regiment participated in French military campaigns in the Southern Netherlands during the War of Devolution, and subsequently participated in other conflicts France became involved in.

After the French and Indian War broke out in 1754, the second battalion of the regiment, along with the Baron de Dieskau and a battalion from the Duke of Artois' Regiment, embarked on troopships at La Rochelle on 3 May 1755 and set sail for New France. Arriving there in the same month, the regiment was stationed in Louisbourg. After the British victory at the Battle of the Plains of Abraham in September 1759, the regiment was sent back to France, where it continued to be stationed until being disbanded in 1791 due to the French Revolution.
