= Claude-Guillaume Testu =

French soldier and marshal of France (1680 – 1770)

Claude-Guillaume Testu Marquis of Balincourt
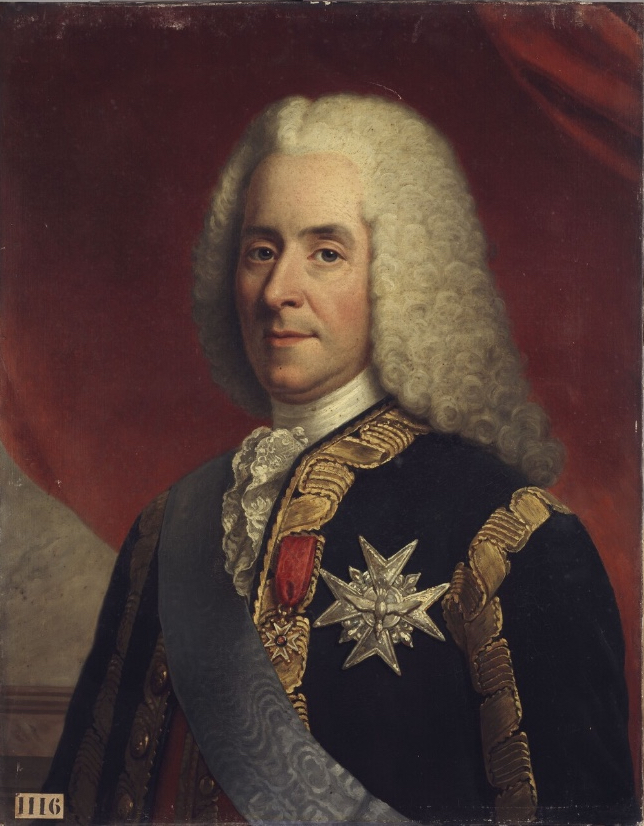
- Portrait by Alexandre-François Caminade
- Born: 18 March 1680
- Died: 12 May 1770 (aged 90)
- Military career
- Allegiance: Kingdom of France
- Service years: 1698–1767
- Rank: Marshal of France
- Conflicts: War of the Spanish Succession; War of the Austrian Succession

Claude-Guillaume Testu, Marquis of Balincourt (18 March 1680 – 12 May 1770) was a French military officer and a marshal of France.

== Biography ==
Testu was the son of Henri Testu de Balincourt and Claude-Marguerite de Sève, daughter of Alexandre de Sève. He was Baron of Bouloire.

He became a musketeer in the Régiment du Roi in 1698 and served in the Army of Flanders under Marshal Louis-François de Boufflers in 1700. During the War of the Spanish Succession, he fought in the Assault on Nijmegen in 1702. Testu was promoted to Colonel in the Artois-Infantry Regiment on 9 May 1703.

He fought at in the First Battle of Höchstädt in 1703 and in Bavaria. He was in Catalonia in 1706 under Marshal René de Froulay, Count of Tessé. In 1710 he was promoted to brigadier of infantry and he was made a field marshal on 1 February 1719. On 1 August 1734 Testu was promoted lieutenant general of the armies. In 1739 he was appointed Governor of Mont-Dauphin. He fought in the War of the Austrian Succession and was at the Battle of Dettingen in 1743, when he commanded a brigade in the Blenheim Garrison. In 1745 he was the French commander in Alsace and on 1 January 1746 he was appointed governor of the city and the citadel of Strasbourg.

On 19 October 1746 Testu was made a marshal of France, on the same day as Philippe Charles de La Fare. He was made a knight of the Order of the Holy Spirit by Louis XV's orders on 7 June 1767.

At the age of 90, he died of starvation owing to an ossified throat.
