= French presence in the Ohio Valley =

French colonial settlements in North America

The French presence in the Ohio Valley was the result of French colonization of North America in present-day Pennsylvania. After Cartier and Champlain's expeditions, France succeeded in establishing relations with the Native American tribes and colonizing the future cities of Montreal and Quebec. In order to retain power after its establishment on the new continent and to continue the lucrative export of beaver skins, France built several forts along the St. Lawrence River and on the shores of Lakes Champlain and Erie. At the confluence of the Allegheny and Monongahela rivers, the French built Fort Duquesne in 1754. Despite its loss in 1759 to the Forbes Expedition, traces of French culture can still be seen today.

== History ==
=== 1534-1645 : Beginning of the French presence in Ohio ===
==== Explorations by René-Robert Cavelier De La Salle ====
The first Europeans arrived in the Ohio Valley in the 17th century. In all likelihood, it was French.

Further explorations will follow notably in 1682.

=== Relations between Natives and French ===
Prior to colonization, Native tribes inhabited the Ohio Valley for centuries. The Monongahelas, for example, had been living in the valley since the 11th century, but generally they had no direct contact with Europeans.

The French relied on the Natives to guide them into the American territories. In addition, the Indians lived close to the French and often married them. This was true of Native Americans in the Pittsburgh area and the Ohio River Valley area in general. In addition, the relationship between the Indians and the French was so strong that most Native American tribes allied with the French during the Conquest, although several chiefs such as Tanachrission wanted to join the British.

=== 1645-1754 : British Claims ===
Beginning in the 1740s, British traders began to cross the Appalachians to trade with the Ohio Indians.

=== 1754-1756 : Beginning of the British conquest ===
In 1754 the British governor of Virginia wanted to gain control of the Ohio Valley, which was under French control. He ordered George Washington to lead troops into the valley. The latter took off in April of this year. When Washington and his soldiers arrived, they began to build a small fort, the future Fort Necessity. An Iroquois leader by the name of Tanaghrisson, a friend of Washington, suggested an attack on the 50 French soldiers stationed near them. On 28 May 1754, Washington led 40 British soldiers and 12 Iroquois warriors against the French site. The young Lieutenant Joseph Coulon de Villiers, Sieur de Jumonville commanded this group of French soldiers. The British ambushed the French, during which the Sieur de Jumonville was killed. Satisfied with their victory, the British returned to Fort Necessity. On 3 July 1754, the French, aided by Native American tribes, took their revenge at the Battle of Fort Necessity. Heavy rain prevented the British from seeing the terrain and defending themselves against their attackers. Eventually they capitulated, granting victory to the French.

=== 1756-1763 : Seven Years' War ===
The Seven Years' War was a major conflict between the British, French, and Native Americans during the colonization of America. Between 1756 and 1763, the warring nations engaged in a violent conflict, which was won by Great Britain.

=== Since the Independence of the United States ===
The city of Cleveland hosts a French Consular agency.

== Historical relics ==
In 1749, De Bienville carried several lead plates with him. On these plates were pronouncements that laid claim to the Ohio Country for France. At the places where major rivers joined the Ohio River, the party stopped and buried one of the tablets. On a nearby tree, a metal plaque was placed, asserting the claims of France and stating that the tablet lay nearby. This practice of burying plates first began in Europe in the Middle Ages and was a common way to show land ownership. In total, De Bienville is believed to have buried six plates. Only one has been found intact.
