= Philippe de Corguilleray =

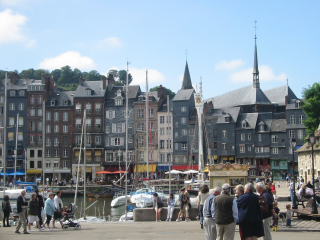
Philippe de Corguilleray departed from Honfleur to Brazil in 1556.

Philippe de Corguilleray, Sieur du Pont, was a Burgundian nobleman who is known for leading a group of Calvinist men from Geneva to the French colony of France Antarctique in Brazil in 1556. The contingent he led included writer Jean de Léry.

Philippe de Corguilleray, who was in retirement near Geneva, had been asked by Admiral Coligny to lead the contingent, following a letter from Villegagnon to Coligny asking for support in his effort to consolidate the French establishment in Rio de Janeiro. He was also solicited by the Church of Geneva, and accepted to lead the mission.

Philippe de Corguilleray further recruited for the trip theologians, including Pierre Richier and Guillaume Chartrier, altogether 14 people from Geneva. The party arrived in Honfleur where they joined a French fleet of three ships financed by the king of France, the Vice-Admiral of which was Sieur Bois-le-Comte, a nephew of Villegagnon. They left for Brazil on 19 November 1556.

== See also ==
- France Antarctique
