= Pierre Richier =

French theologian

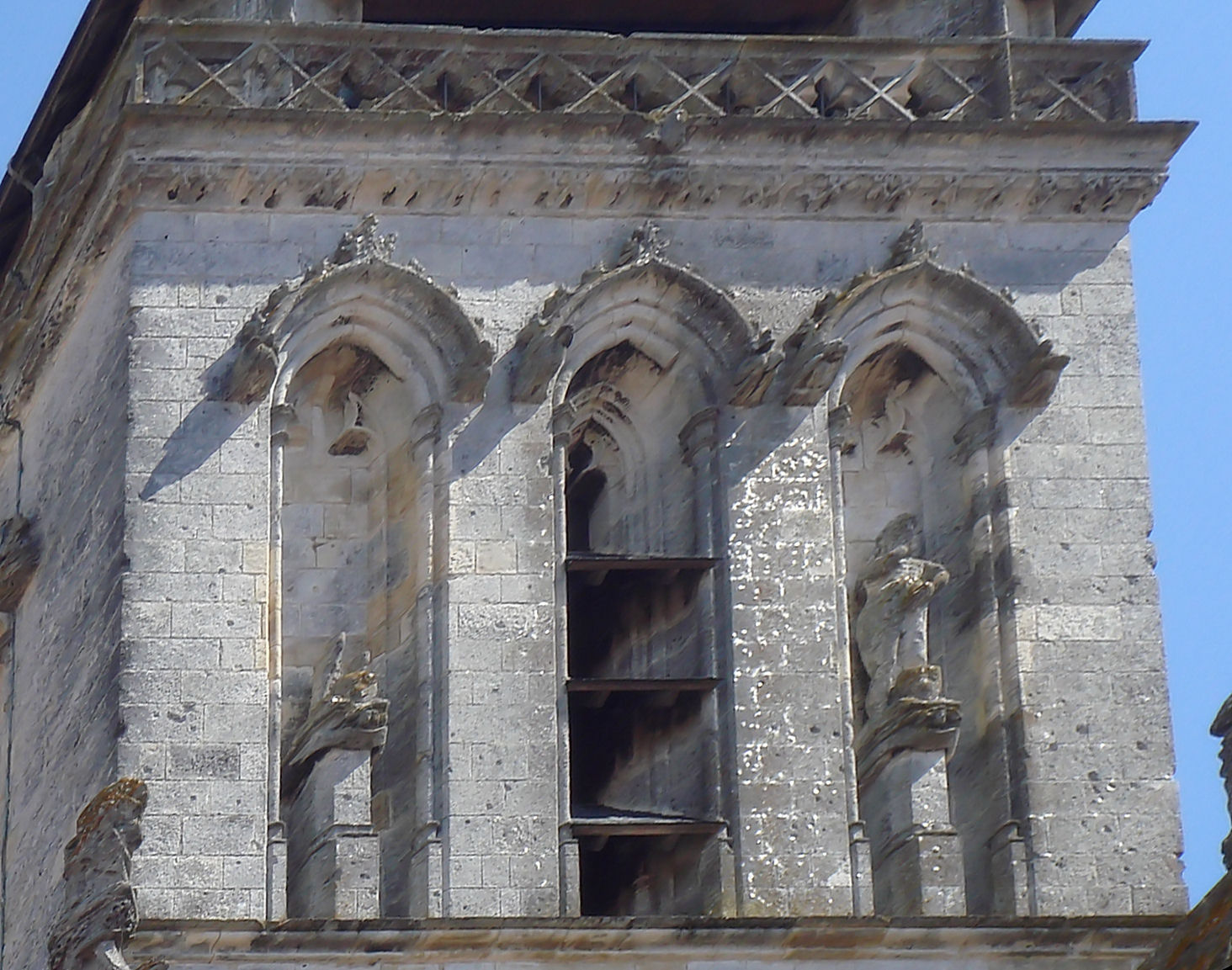
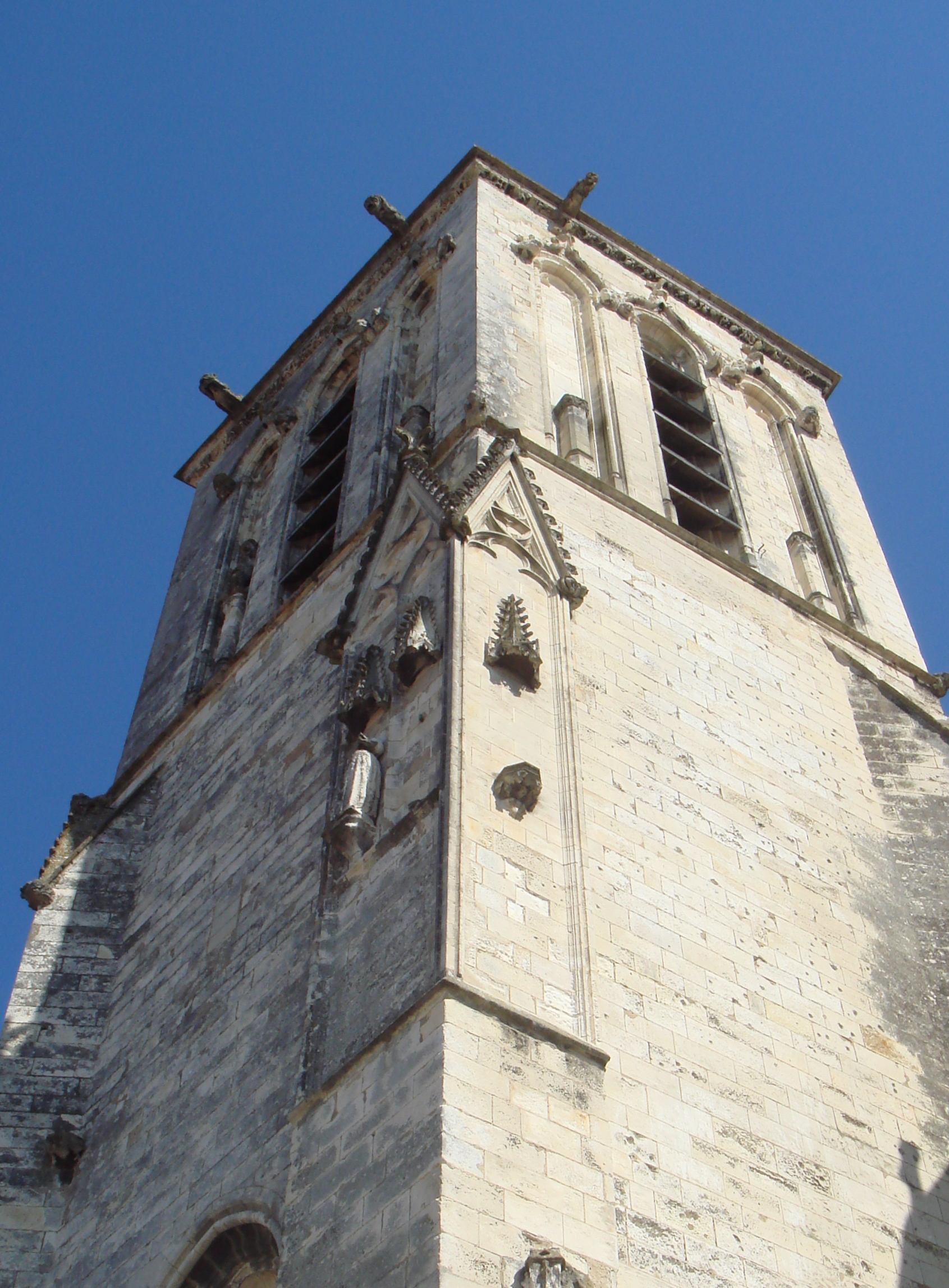
Remains of Reformation iconoclasm in La Rochelle, under the Ministry of Pierre Richier, in 1562. Clocher Saint-Barthélémy (left), Eglise Saint-Sauveur (right), La Rochelle.

Pierre Richier, also Pierre Richer, dit de Lisle, (circa 1506–1580) was a French Calvinist theologian, who accompanied Philippe de Corguilleray on a French expedition to Brazil in 1556, to reinforce the colony of France Antarctique. He was a member of a contingent of 14 Calvinist people dispatched from Geneva. He later became the main actor in developing La Rochelle as a Huguenot capital.

Pierre Richer was initially ordained as a Carmelite and was from the congregation of Albi. He was a member of a Paris convent, when he fled the Order for Geneva in 1556.

Pierre Richier accompanied Philippe de Corguilleray to Brazil in 1556 at the request of the French soldier and explorer Nicolas Durand de Villegaignon. After the failure of the expedition, Pierre Richier returned in 1558 to the city of La Rochelle, where his preaching became very influential.

Pierre de Richier became "Ministre de l'église de la Rochelle" ("Minister of the Church of La Rochelle", also "Ministre de la parole de Dieu" or "Minister of the Word of God"), and was able to grow considerably the Huguenot presence in La Rochelle, from a small base of about 50 souls who had been secretly educated to Lutheranism by Charles de Clermont the previous year. La Rochelle, together with a few other cities such as Sancerre, became the last Protestant strongholds in the French Wars of Religion, following the failure of colonization ventures in the New World which Gaspard de Coligny had been promoting.

In 1561, Pierre Richier published in Geneva a pamphlet against Villegagnon's actions in Brazil, entitled "Réfutation des folles resveries, excecrable blasphèmes, erreurs et mensonges de Nicolas Durand, qui se nomme Villagagnon".

In La Rochelle, Pierre Richier virulently preached against the subversion of the January 1562 Edicts of toleration by Charles IX of France and Catherine de' Medici. He had been described, by Lancelot Voisin de La Popelinière, as "le père de l'église de La Rochelle" ("The Father of the Church of La Rochelle").

Pierre Richier died in La Rochelle in 1580.
