= Royal Regiment (France) =

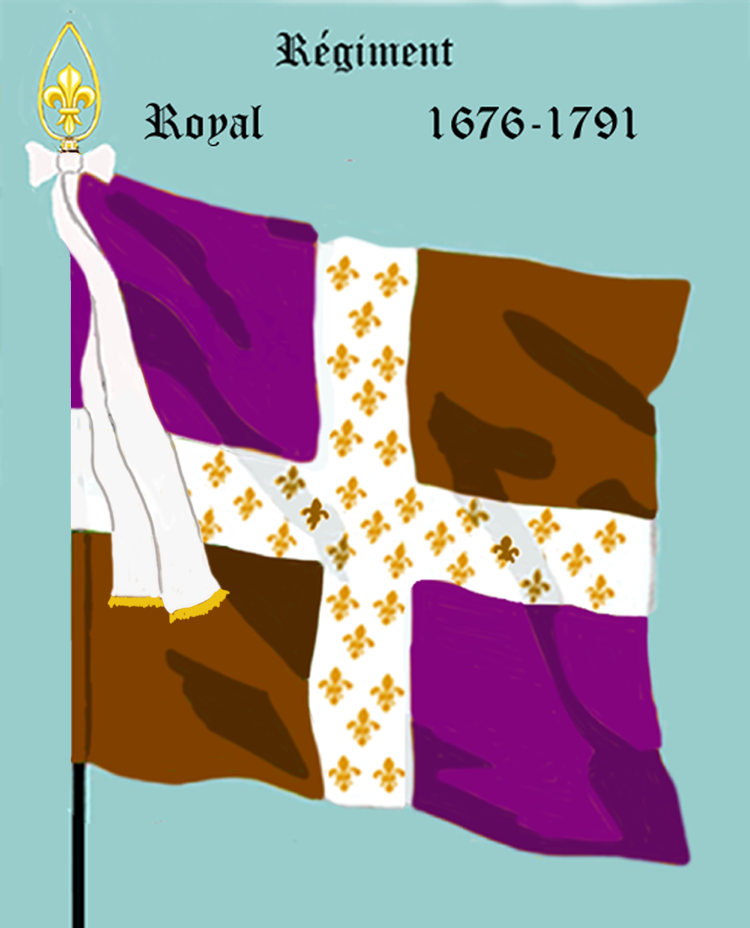
Régiment Royal (1663-1791)

The Régiment Royal was a French Army regiment that had been enlarged by renaming and uniting older regiments. At the time, the régiment de l'Altesse and the régiment Royal became one. The regiment Royal was first started 1656 by the Duke d'Arpajon.
