= Duke of Artois' Regiment =

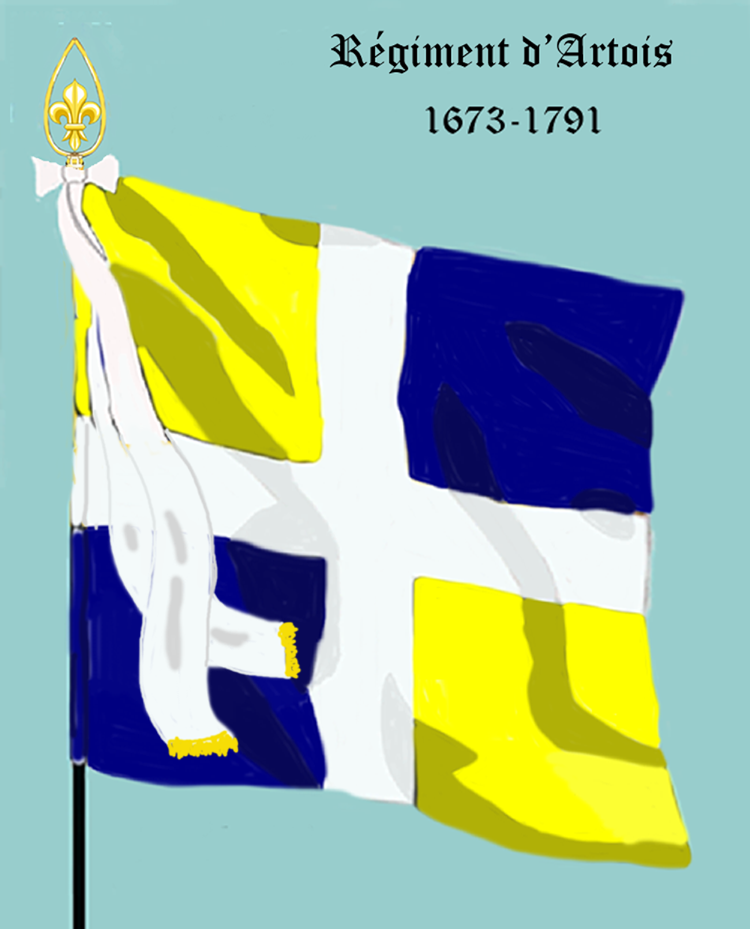
Régiment Artois (1673-1791)

The Régiment d'Artois was a French Army regiment active during the late 17th century and 18th century. It is principally known for its role in the Seven Years' War, when it served in the North American theatre.

== History ==
The regiment arrived in New France in May 1755, and was posted in Louisbourg. The regiment was initially created in 1610 by the comte de Beaumont Saint-Vallier. Under Louis XIV in 1670, it became part of the régiment Royal. In 1671 it was called the regiment Chateauneuf, and in 1673, it took the name of the province of Artois. The King wanted to perpetuate the title of the régiment d'Artois by giving it the privilege of being a royal regiment under the French crown. On May 3, 1755, the second battalions of the régiments d'Artois and de La Reine embarked at La Rochelle for Canada, with the new military governor Baron von Dieskau. After the capitulation of Québec on the 17th of September 1759, the regiment came back to France, where it remained until the end of the ancien regime.
