= Voyage dans le Nord du Brésil =

1615 book

- Author: Yves d'Évreux
- Publication date: 1615

Voyage dans le Nord du Brésil fait durant les années 1613 et 1614 (Journey made in the north of Brazil during the years 1613 and 1614) is a travel and missionary report by the Capuchin friar Yves d'Évreux (c. 1577 – 1632 or 1633) about his stay in the French colony in northern Brazil in the years 1613 and 1614. The work was originally published in 1615 under the title Suitte de l'histoire des choses plus memorables advenues en Maragnan es années 1613 et 1614 (Continuation of the history of the most memorable events that occurred in Maranhão in the years 1613 and 1614) and was republished in the 19th century by Ferdinand Denis.

== Origin and transmission ==
Yves d'Évreux belonged to the Capuchins who arrived in 1612 in the French colony on the island of Maranhão (today São Luís). Together with the writings of Claude d’Abbeville, his work constitutes one of the central testimonies on the so-called France équinoxiale, the French colony in northern Brazil.

The first edition of 1615 was almost completely destroyed; only a single copy has survived. This copy is held in the former Bibliothèque impériale de Paris.

== Structure and contents ==
The work consists of two treatises:

The first treatise bears no separate title.
The second treatise is entitled: Des fruits de l’Évangile qui tôt parurent par le baptême de plusieurs enfants (“On the fruits of the Gospel that soon appeared through the baptism of several children”).

Both parts report on the events of the years 1613 and 1614 in Maranhão. The text contains both descriptions of the Indigenous population and accounts of the activity of the Capuchins and the role of the European colonists. According to the French historian Frédéric Mauro, the work belongs to the four fundamental testimonies on the French presence in Brazil in the 16th and 17th centuries, alongside the writings of André Thévet, Jean de Léry and Claude d’Abbeville.

== 1864 edition ==
The modern edition appeared in 1864 from the publisher A. Franck (Leipzig and Paris). The editor was Ferdinand Denis, who prepared the text on the basis of the only surviving copy in the Paris library and provided it with an introduction and notes. The edition appeared in the series Bibliotheca americana – collection d’ouvrages inédits et rares sur l’Amérique.

== Significance and reception ==
The work is regarded as a rare source for the history of French colonial attempts in northern Brazil and for the missionary history of the Capuchins.

== See also ==
- History of a Voyage to the Land of Brazil (Jean de Léry)

== Bibliography ==
- Yves d'Évreux: Voyage dans le Nord du Brésil, fait durant les années 1613 et 1614 par le Père Yves d'Évreux; publié, d'après l'exemplaire unique conservé à la Bibliothèque impériale de Paris, avec une introduction et des notes par M. Ferdinand Denis. A. Franck, Leipzig, Paris 1864
- Obtenir la version papier de ce livre: Suitte de l'histoire des choses plus memorables advenues en Maragnan es années 1613 et 1614: Second traité (1615)
- MacCormack, Sabine (2000). "Ethnography in South America: The First Two Hundred Years". In Trigger, Bruce G.; Salomon, Frank; Washburn, Wilcomb E. (eds.). The Cambridge history of the native peoples of the Americas Part I. Vol. III. Cambridge University Press. pp. 96–187. ISBN 0-521-63075-4.
