= Pineapple mania =

18th- to 19th-century horticultural movement

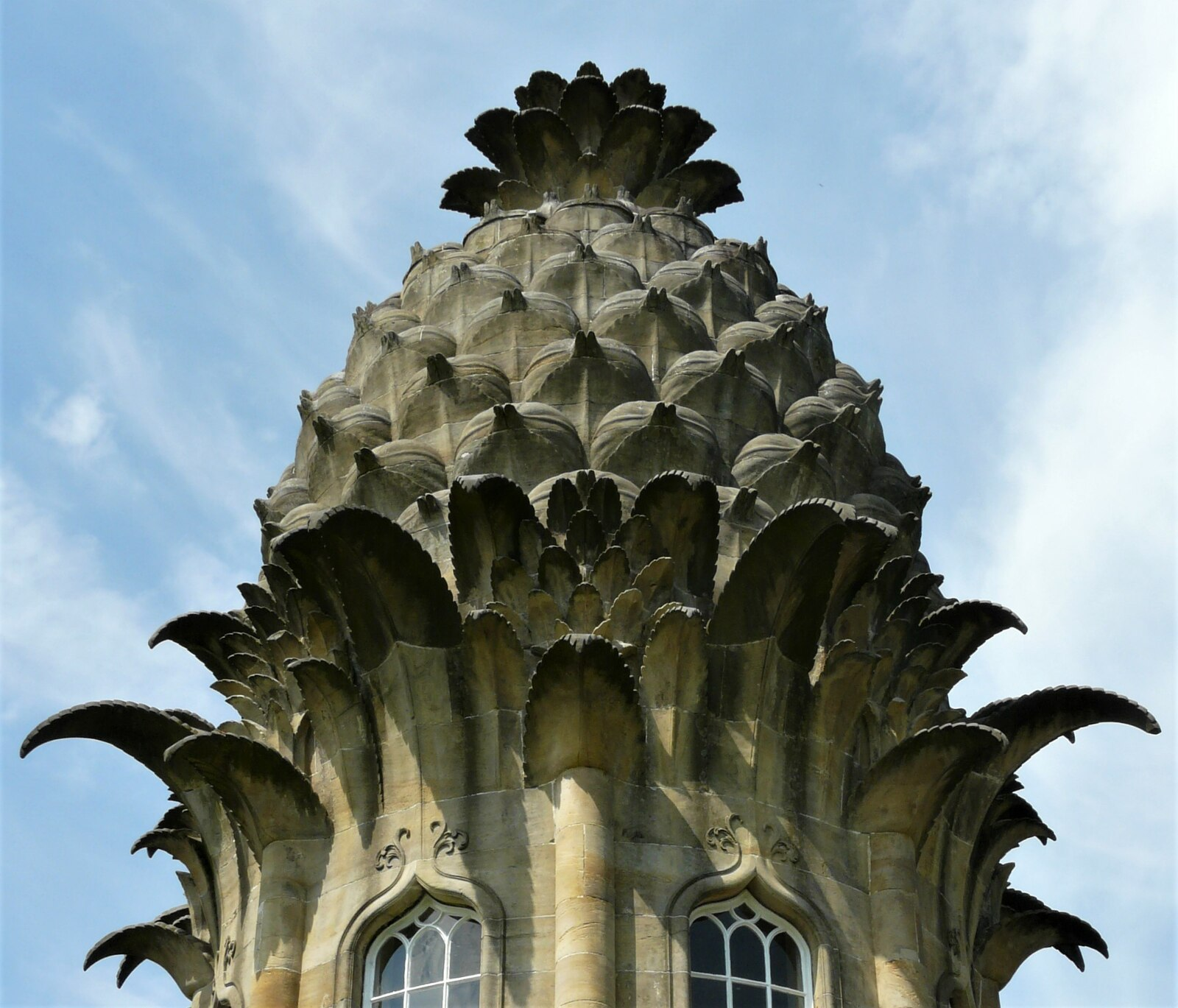
Dunmore Pineapple

Pineapple mania, also known as pineapple fever, was a period of intense fascination with pineapples in Europe that spanned approximately 150 years, from the early 18th century to the mid-to-late-19th century. The craze was ignited by the introduction of pineapples from the New World, captivating European royals and horticulturists who sought to cultivate the exotic fruit.

The difficulty of growing pineapples in colder climates contributed to their scarcity and exorbitant cost, establishing them as symbols of great wealth, power, and status. Unlike most fruits known at the time, which had representation in extensive bodies of knowledge and literature dating back to antiquity, the pineapple was entirely novel, inspiring imaginative and fantastical representations in popular culture. This perception influenced cuisine, decorative arts, architecture, philosophy, and technology in Europe and the newly formed United States.

== Background ==
Pineapple (Ananas comosus) is a species in the bromeliad family native to tropical America, thought to have long been cultivated by the indigenous Tupi and Guaraní people in the area of what is now known as Brazil, Colombia, Guyana, and Venezuela, with the plant cultivated and distributed from South America to Central America and the Caribbean islands long before the arrival of Europeans.

On his second transatlantic voyage to the New World from 1493–1496, Christopher Columbus (1451–1506) arrived in the Caribbean islands in November 1493. He explored the island of Guadeloupe for six days, finding pineapple for the first time in a village inhabited by the Kalina people (Caribs). Impressed by its taste and smell, the expedition stocked up on copious amounts of the fruit to bring back to the King of Spain, but only one survived the journey. Columbus called the fruit piña de Indes ("pines of the Indians").

=== Introduction to Europe ===
Columbus returned to Spain from his second voyage on June 11, 1496. He presented a single surviving specimen of pineapple, along with other unique species he discovered, to Ferdinand II of Aragon and Isabella I of Castile, the Catholic Monarchs of Spain. Italian historian Peter Martyr d'Anghiera (1457–1526) recorded the event in his work De Orbe Novo (1516), famously noting that the King "prefers" the pineapple "to all others", giving it the official approval of the monarchy and launching the centuries-long obsession with the fruit.

The first appearance of pineapples in English literature was in the form "ananas" in 1568 by Thomas Hacket who translated Singularidades do França Antarctica (1555) by André Thevet. It is unknown exactly when the first pineapple appeared in England, but Oliver Cromwell (1599–1658) was said to have received one as a gift in 1657. It is believed with certainty that the court of Charles II of England (1630–1685) first served and ate a pineapple during a dinner reception for the French ambassador in 1668, and this was attested to in some detail by diarist and gardener John Evelyn (1620–1706).

Early representations of the pineapple in European art
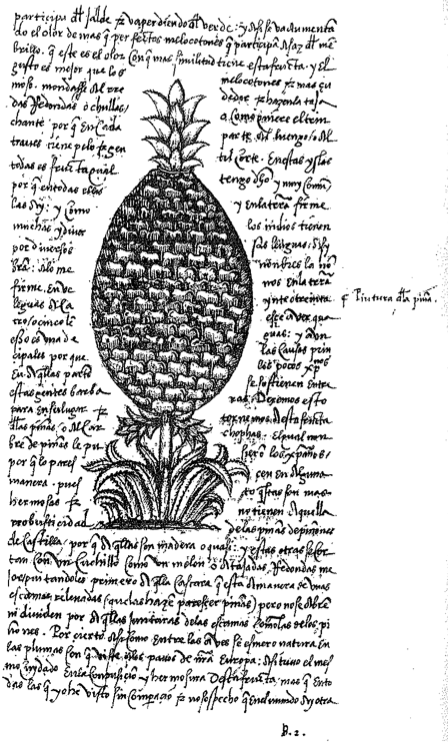
Oviedo published the first known drawing of a pineapple in La Natural hystoria de las Indias (1526)

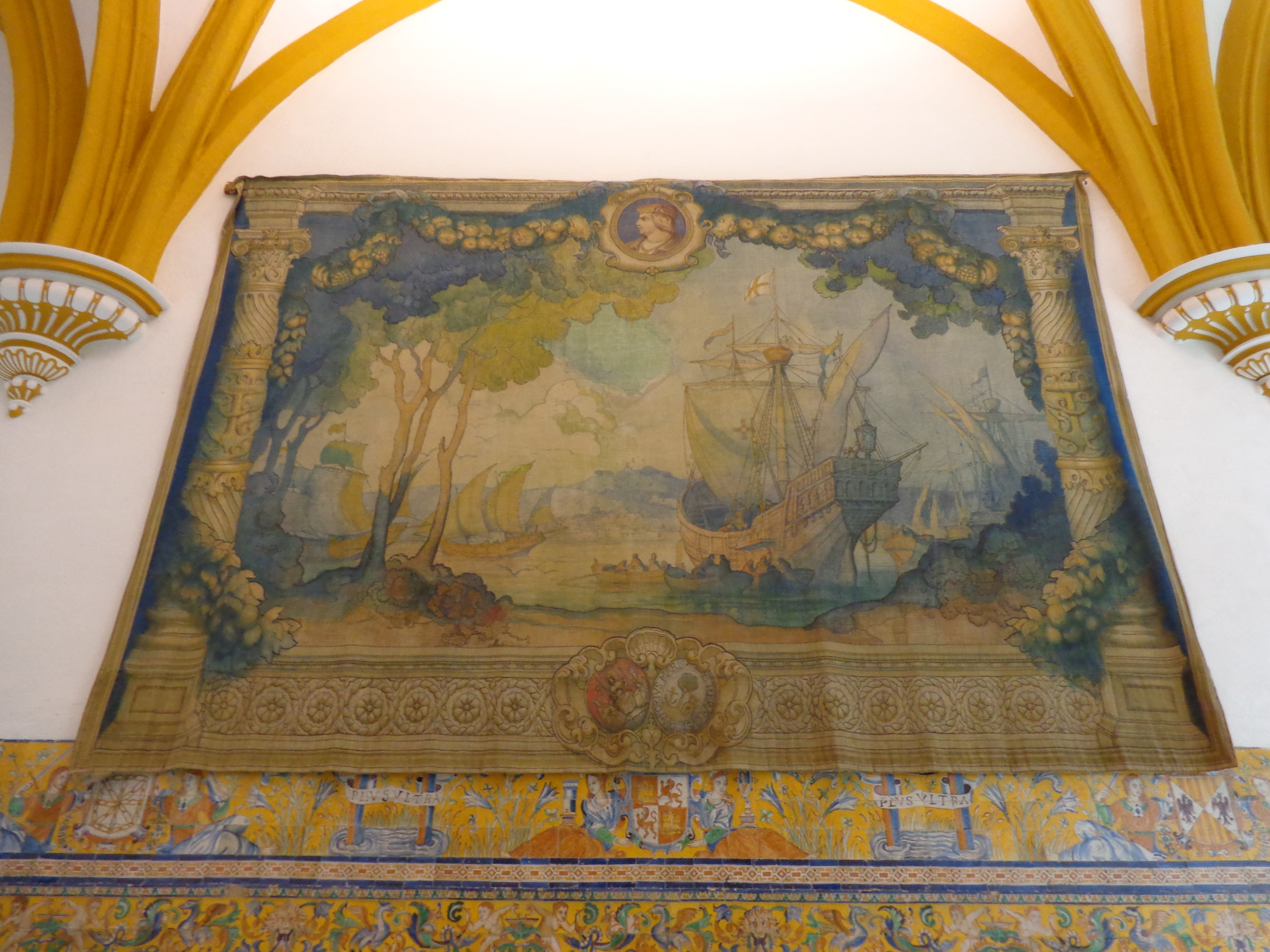
Galleon tapestry depicting pineapples. Alcazar Palace, Seville, Spain.

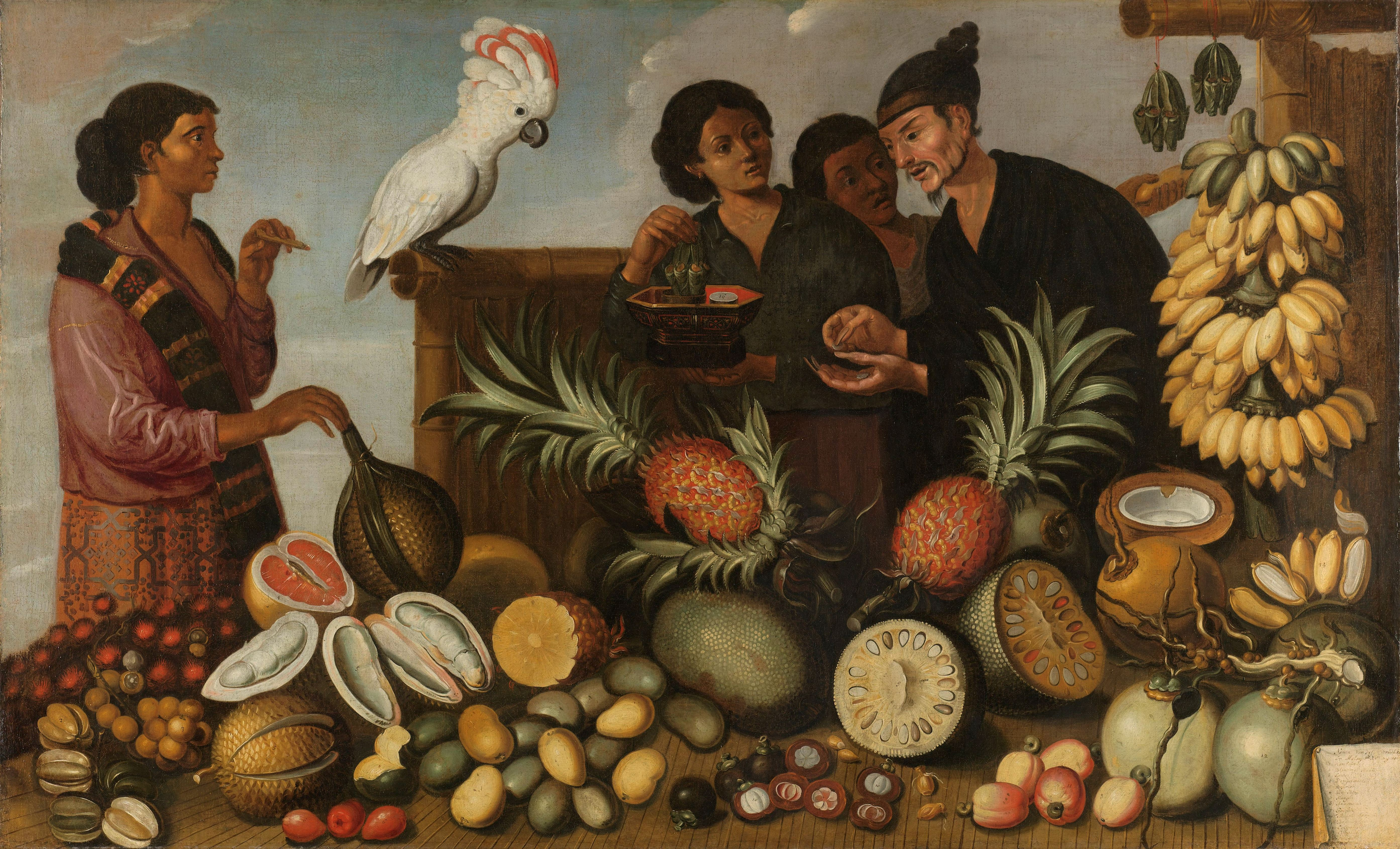
East Indian Market Stall (1640-1666)

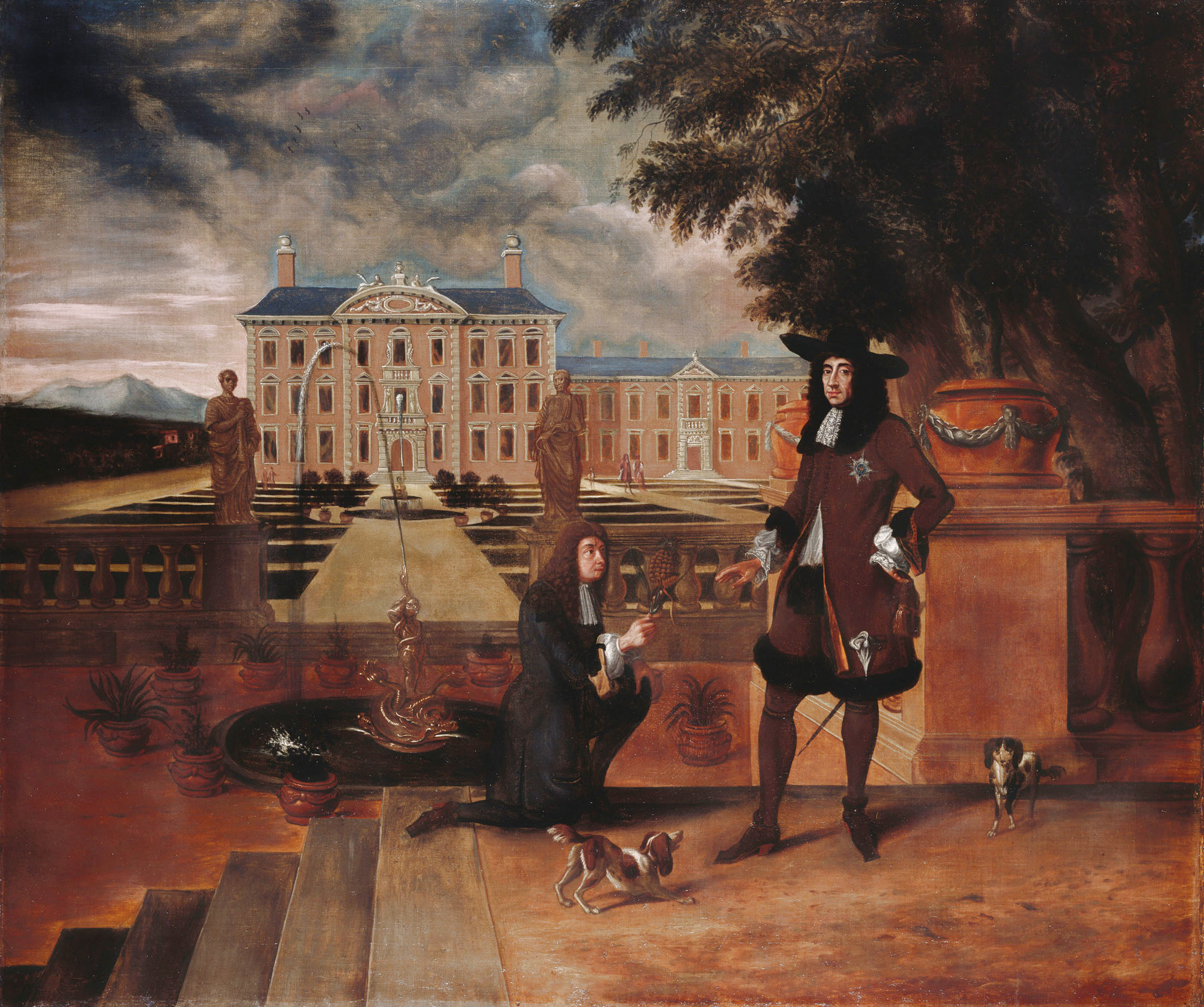
Charles II Presented with a Pineapple (c.1675-80)

== Horticultural technology ==
=== Dutch innovation ===
The technology, methods, and techniques needed for tropical pineapple cultivation in a cold climate like Europe depended on separate innovations in what over time later contributed to the development of the modern conservatory: improvements in glass pane production to capture more light, temperature regulation with the use of early alcohol thermometers, the development of pineapple pits (also known as pineries), hothouses with stoves, and the use of tanner's bark to heat the bottom of the plants. Many of these developments are attributed to various people, although Dutch cloth merchant Pieter de la Court van der Voort (1664-1739), was one of the first to experiment with them in whole or in part in his garden at Allmansgeest (later renamed Berbice) in South Holland. His father, Pieter de la Court, was credited with growing one of the first pineapples in 1658, but this is dismissed by some experts as a legend.

The younger De la Court's methods and techniques did not develop in a vacuum. Dutch botanist and physician Herman Boerhaave (1668–1738) was a friend and neighbor of De la Court, and it is thought that their shared interest in experimental glasshouses, stove design and temperature control directly influenced each other. Although De la Court widely shared his ideas with visitors and those in his close network, they would remain private until he finally published them in Bijzondere aenmerkingen, or Special Remarks (1737), two years before his death.

Unheated greenhouses, like those used in an orangery, first emerged in Italian Renaissance gardens in the late 15th century, leading to its culmination in the largest of its kind at the time at the Versailles Orangerie in France. The system was designed to allow the fruit trees to be moved around in boxes, surviving in shelters during the winter with nearby fires for heat. By the mid-17th century, such systems used iron stoves fueled by coal and charcoal, but the fumes could be deadly to the plants. English gardener and founding Fellow of the Royal Society John Evelyn helped contribute to the development of greenhouse heating technology with a unique design in 1664.

The first stable hothouse was eventually built in 1682 for the Hortus Medicus in Amsterdam, using glass and heated by peat. It was followed by the Hortus Botanicus of Leiden in 1685 with some private estate gardens following the trend. This technology would later allow pineapple growers to maintain consistent greenhouse temperatures, but the details of how to control the temperature of the soil remained to be worked out until the early 18th century when the seldom known techniques of using tanners' bark and consistent temperature regulation with the use of thermometers became more widely known and shared.

=== Agneta Block ===
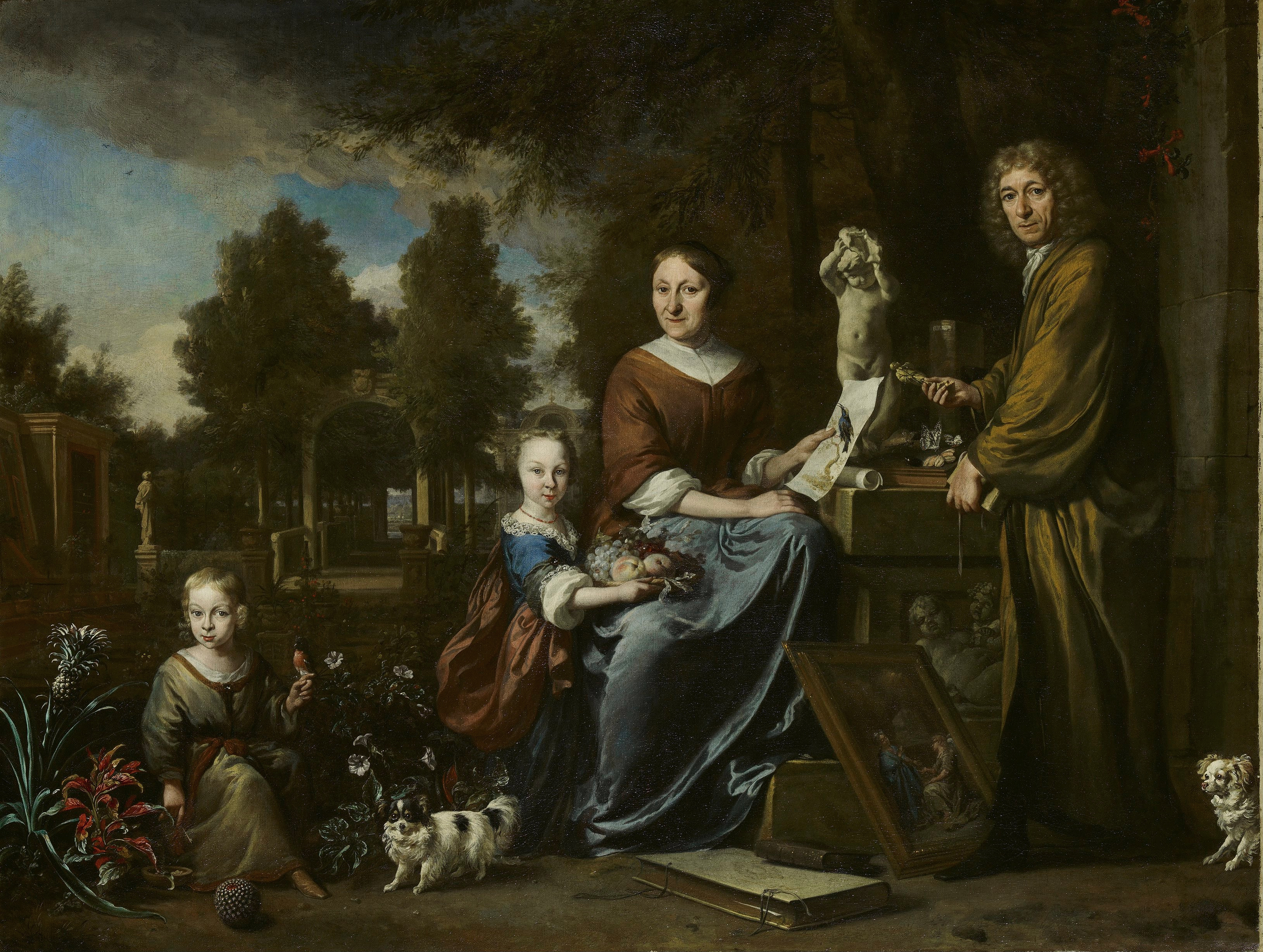
Agneta Block and her garden at Vijverhof, by Jan Weenix. Pineapples appear on the left.

Amateur Dutch horticulturalist Agneta Block (1629–1704) established an experimental garden at Vijverhof, her country estate in Loenen, after becoming a widow at the age of 40. Between 1685 and 1687, she made a scientific breakthrough in cultivating and fruiting the first pineapple in Europe, a fleeting and difficult endeavor that had been tried for years by professionals without success. Her technique involved the use of viable cuttings, new hothouse technology known as a pineapple pit, and the planting of pineapple slips, shoots taken from the bottom of the plant.

It is believed that Block's pineapple was originally derived from cuttings from the Hortus Botanicus in Leiden, which in turn had come from the Dutch colony of Surinam in 1680. Block's status as an amateur and private individual gave her an advantage, writes food historian Garritt van Dyk, as "royal gardeners and professional botanists were unable to achieve" her breakthrough. According to van Dyk, Block's success in propagating and fruiting the pineapple for the first time was due to "the lack of institutional hierarchy and procedure" at her home at Vijverhof. This advantage, writes van Dyk, "allowed for greater freedom in methodology and experimentation outside the boundaries of accepted academic protocols and the exigencies of commercial viability".

=== Henry Telende ===
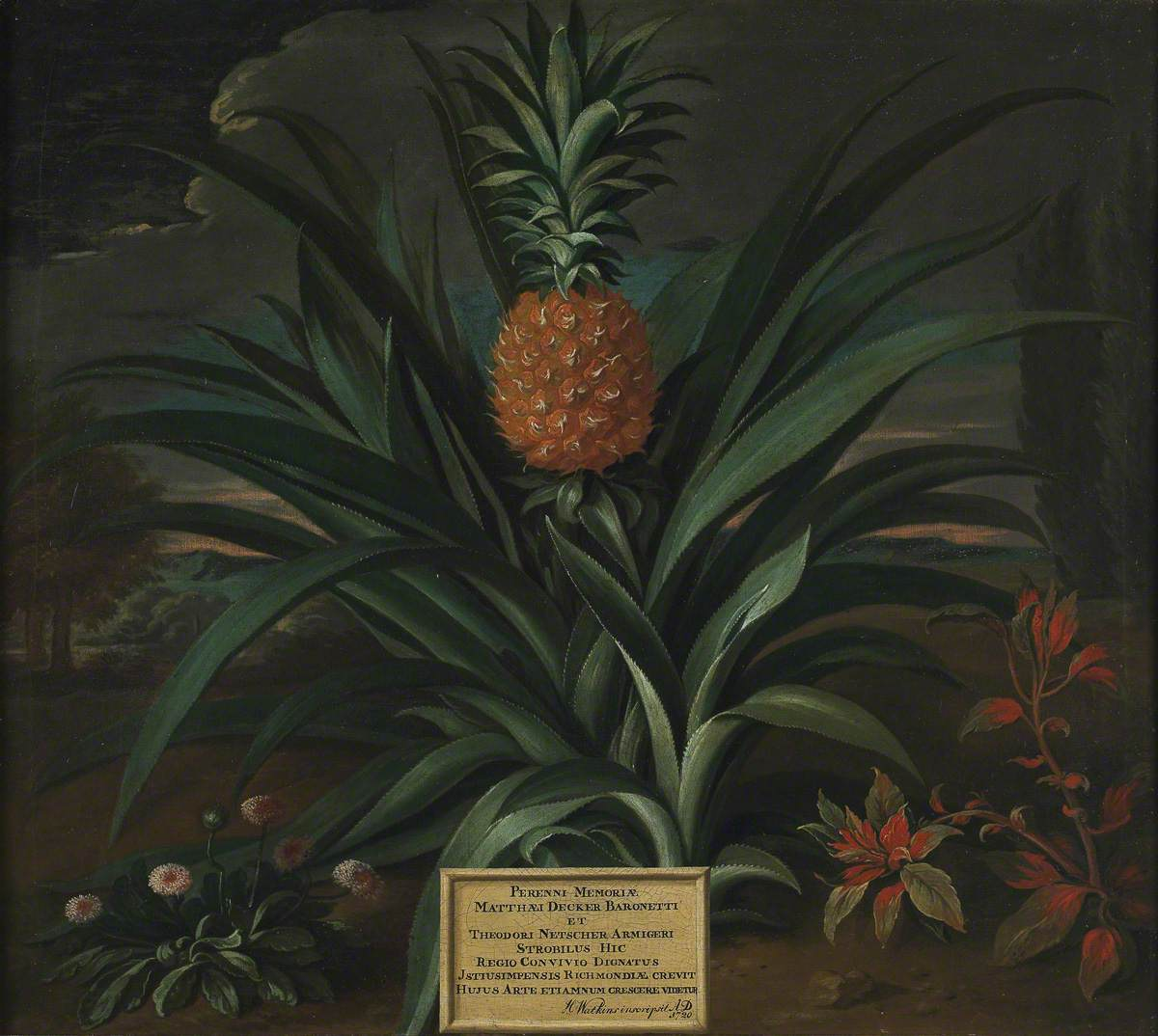
Pineapple grown in Sir Matthew Decker's garden at Richmond, Surrey (1720)

Around 1714, Henry Telende, a Dutch gardener employed by Matthew Decker, a Dutch-born English merchant, economist, and politician, made a breakthrough in English efforts to cultivate the pineapple. Telende relied on the techniques of Pieter de la Court, building a large hothouse system that could produce more pineapples than ever before. Telende's system was fairly robust and reliable, dependent on planting slips or fruit crowns in containers in a hotbed with equal parts manure and tanner's bark to keep the bottom of the plant consistently warm. The plants would sit under a glass, lean-to greenhouse that provided the maximum amount of light until the winter, when they were then moved to a hothouse, then back again to a hotbed after the end of the winter season.

Telende also made use of alcohol thermometers which helped to carefully control the climatic conditions for the very first time. With the help of Telende's new method, by 1715 or 1716, Decker became the first man in Britain to grow pineapples at a commercial scale in his garden in Richmond, producing 30-40 fruits per year. English naturalist and writer Richard Bradley (1688–1732), who had also spent a few months in Amsterdam familiarizing himself with the techniques of Pieter de la Court, popularized Telende to the wider horticultural community in A General Treatise of Husbandry and Gardening (1721), leading to what became known as pineapple mania, an explosion in pineapple cultivation in Britain.

=== Pineapple cultivation during the mania ===
- Hortus Botanicus (Leiden, Netherlands)
- Chelsea Physic Garden (London, England)
- Hampton Court Palace (London, England)
- Versailles (Versailles, France)
- Chatsworth House (Derbyshire, England)
- Mount Vernon (Fairfax County, Virginia, U.S.)
- Kew Gardens (London, England)
- Kensington Palace (London, England)
- Château de Malmaison (Rueil, France)
- Tsarskoye Selo (Pushkin, Saint Petersburg, Russia)
- Heligan estate (Cornwall, England)
- Pavlovsk Palace (Saint Petersburg, Russia)
- St Mary's Gardens (London, England)

== Culture ==
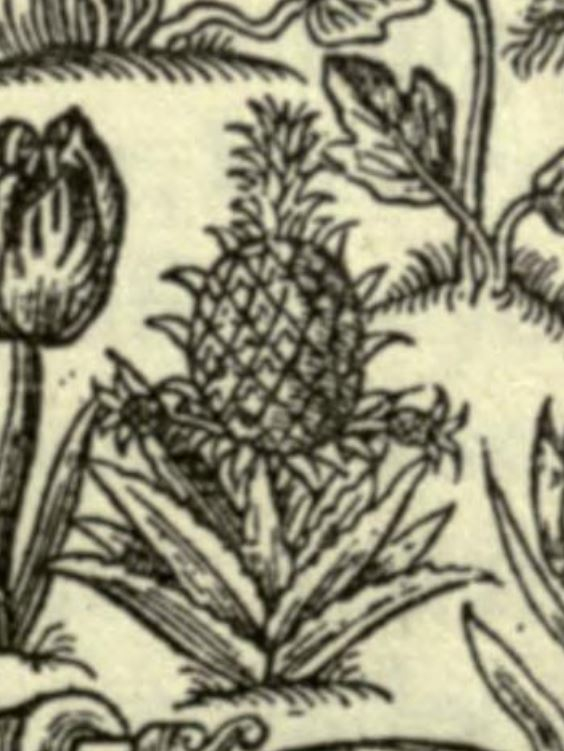
Detail of pineapple shown in the Garden of Eden frontispiece

The earliest image of a pineapple in a book printed in English appears in Paradisi in Sole Paradisus Terrestris (Park-in-Sun's Terrestrial Paradise), a 1629 gardening manual by botanist John Parkinson, an apothecary to James I and Royal Botanist to Charles I. The pineapple is depicted in a Garden of Eden frontispiece, although its author may not have ever seen an actual pineapple plant.

Pineapple mania began to take off when gardeners started to cultivate pineapple plants in Europe. When King Louis XV started growing pineapples in hothouses in France in 1733, the nobility imitated him. At a masquerade celebrating his son's marriage, he and his retinue dressed as "yew trees trimmed in the shape of pineapples". In England, each pineapple cost about 80 pounds to produce (1,890 pounds/$3,000 in modern terms).

The pineapple's association with the social class of nobility led to its widespread adoption as an architectural motif. The pineapple motif appeared on furniture, doorways, tableware, wallpapers, in handiwork, including elaborate hairstyles. Hosts could rent a pineapple to display while entertaining.

Potteries in Staffordshire, including Wedgwood, sold ceramic molds to create jelly and flummery in the shape of a pineapple, as well as teapots shaped like pineapples. In Scotland, John Murray built a hothouse with a large pineapple as a focal point of its architecture in 1761 called the Dunmore Pineapple. In colonial America, pineapple architectural motifs are found as early as the 1730s, but may have become even more popular with the rise of Colonial Revival architecture in New England more than a century later in the 1870s.

Pineapple architectural motifs
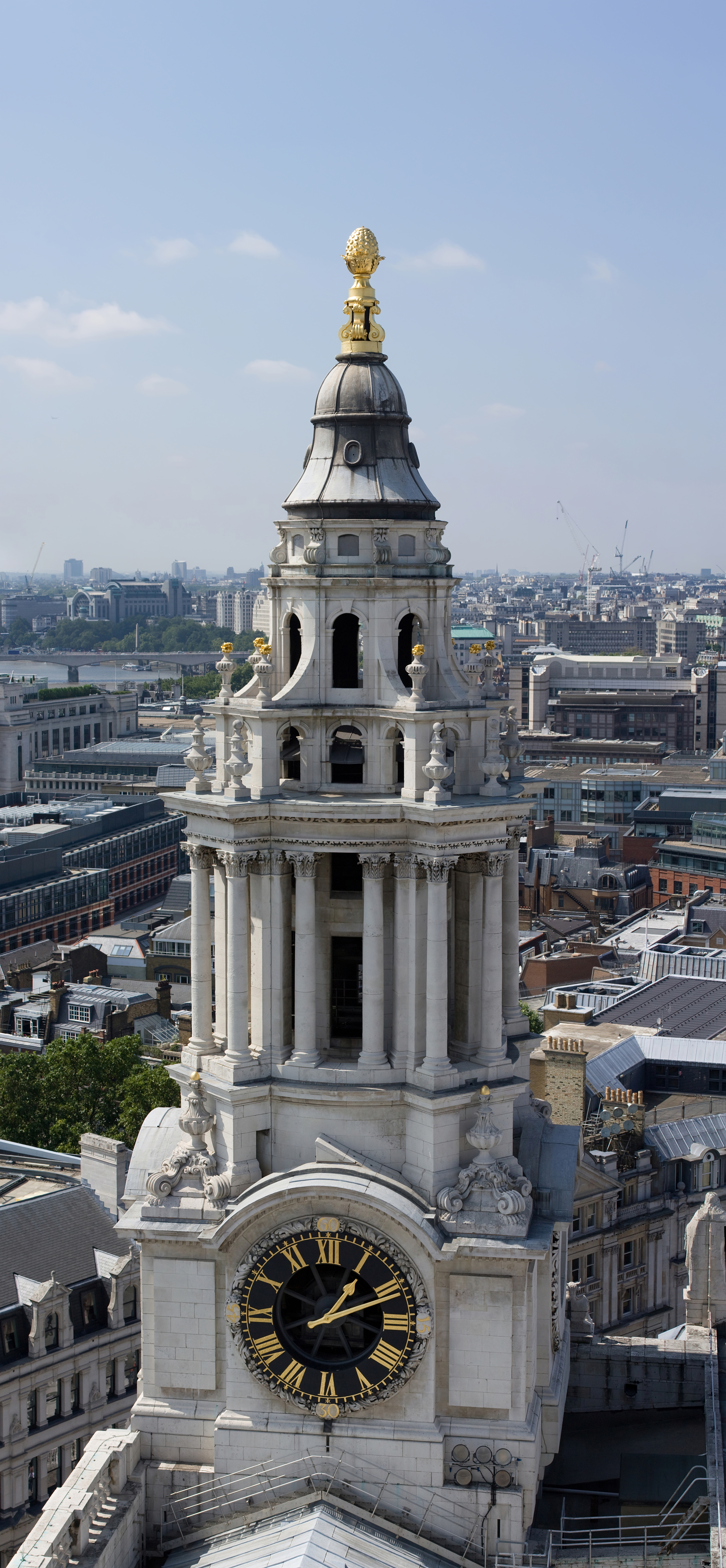
The finial pineapple on St Paul's Cathedral

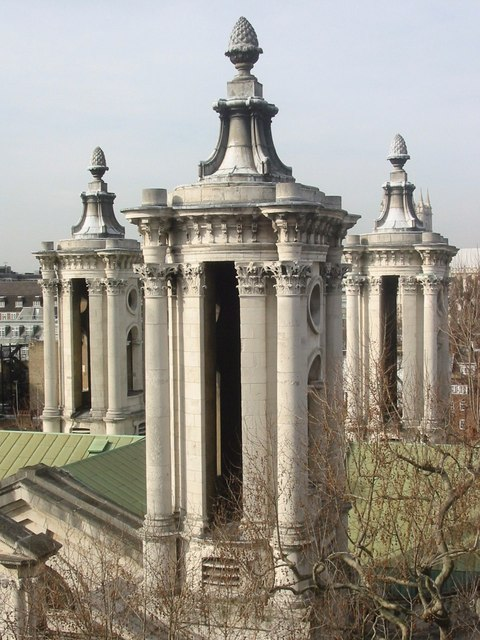
Pineapples atop the Church of St. John the Evangelist

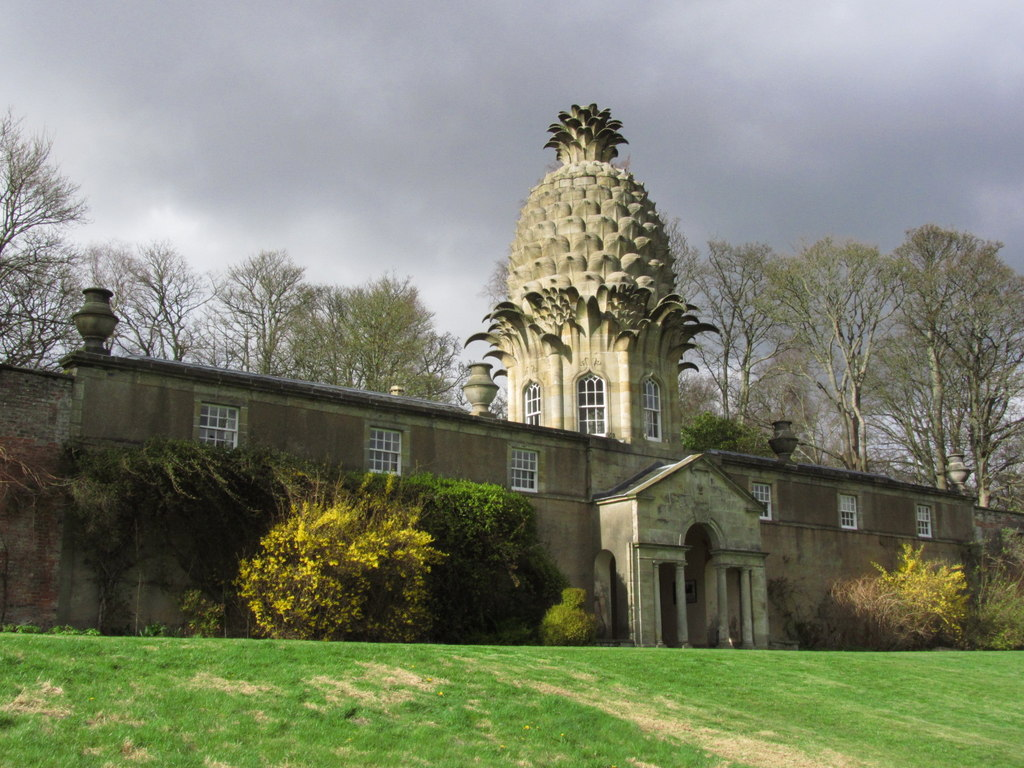
Dunmore Pineapple

By the mid-18th century, the popularity of decorative pineapple tableware had reached the American colonies, some of which were imported from Britain and Ireland. Just before the American revolution, between 1750 and 1775, silver coffeepots and teapots in the colonies displayed the British fashion for lids topped by pineapples. By the late 18th century, both George Washington (1732–1799) and Thomas Jefferson (1743–1826) were known to enjoy pineapple in the elite, English country home tradition. Washington ordered large quantities of pineapples from the West Indies, while Jefferson was known to prefer pineapple pudding at dessert. Pineapples were used as a symbol of hospitality, and one variation of the Log Cabin patchwork quilt pattern was called the pineapple.

By the 19th century, pineapples were more accessible to the middle class and imported fruit began to appear on middle-class tables and in decorative motifs in ceramics and handiwork. Needlework in 19th century America also began to make use of pineapple crochet and lace designs, becoming one of the most popular motifs of the time in the textile arts.

Pineapple decorative motifs in ceramics and handiwork
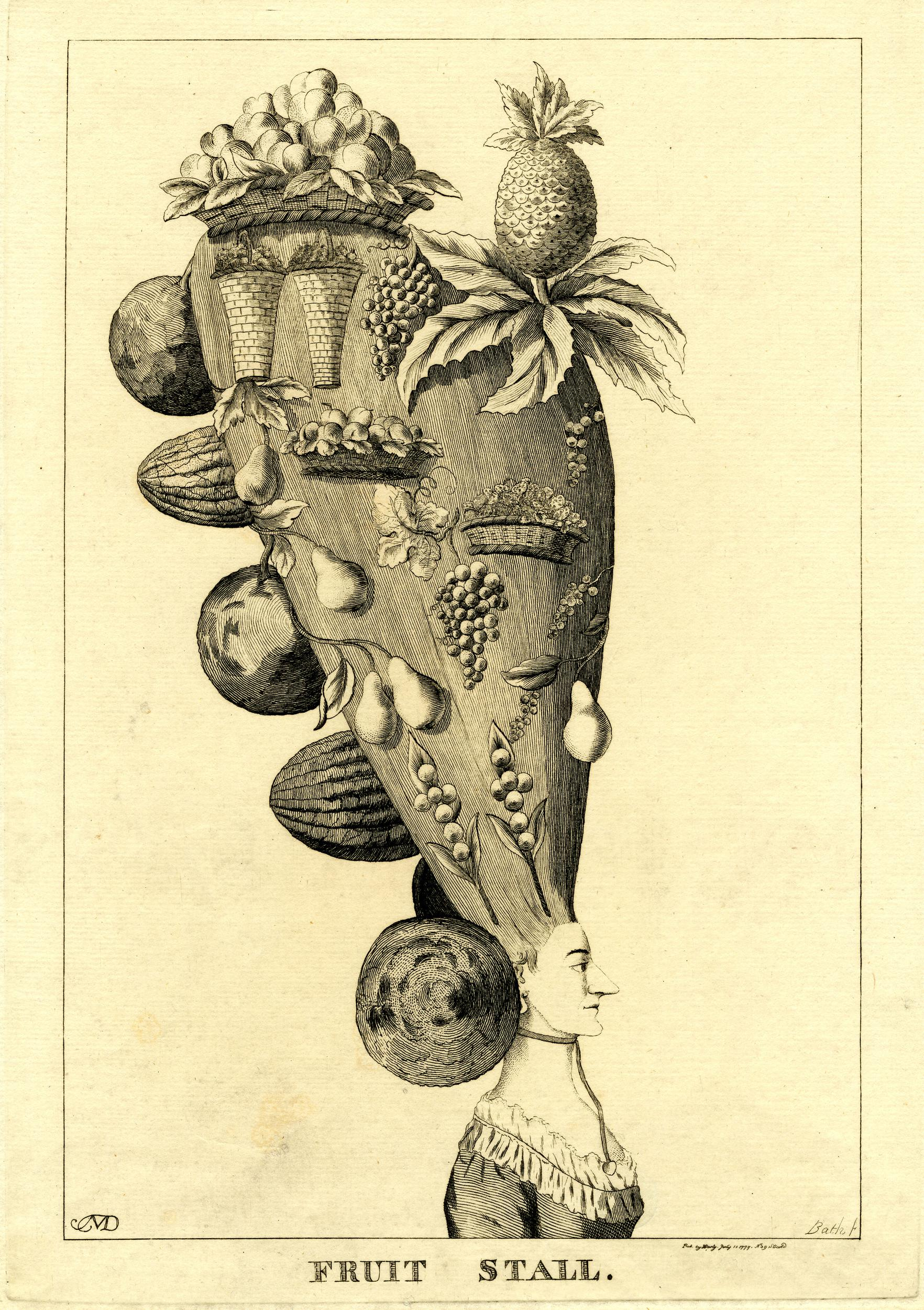
Satirical image of a large hairstyle including a pineapple, 1777

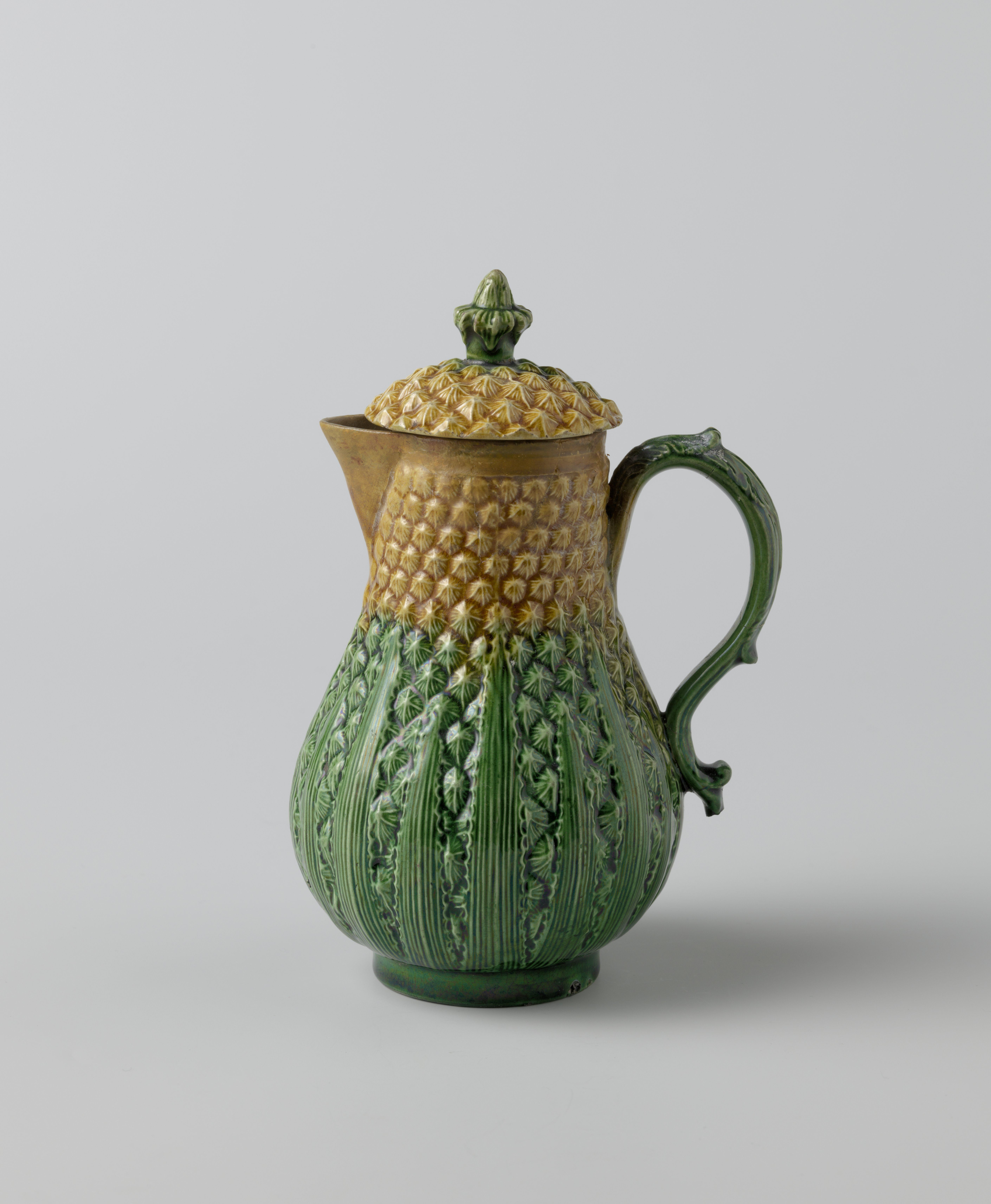
Pineapple ware from England, 1765-1775

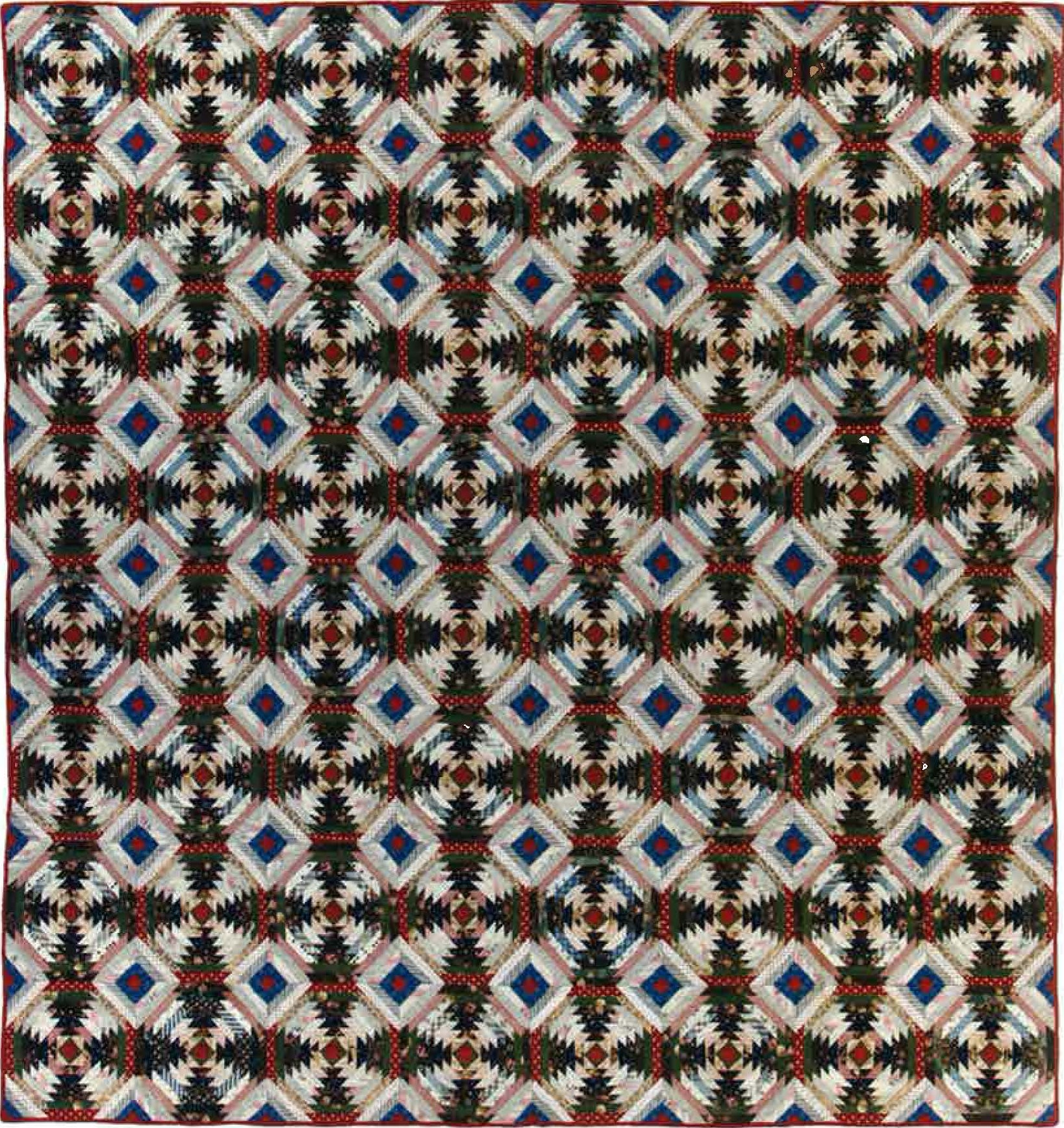
Quilt using the pineapple variation of the traditional log cabin square.

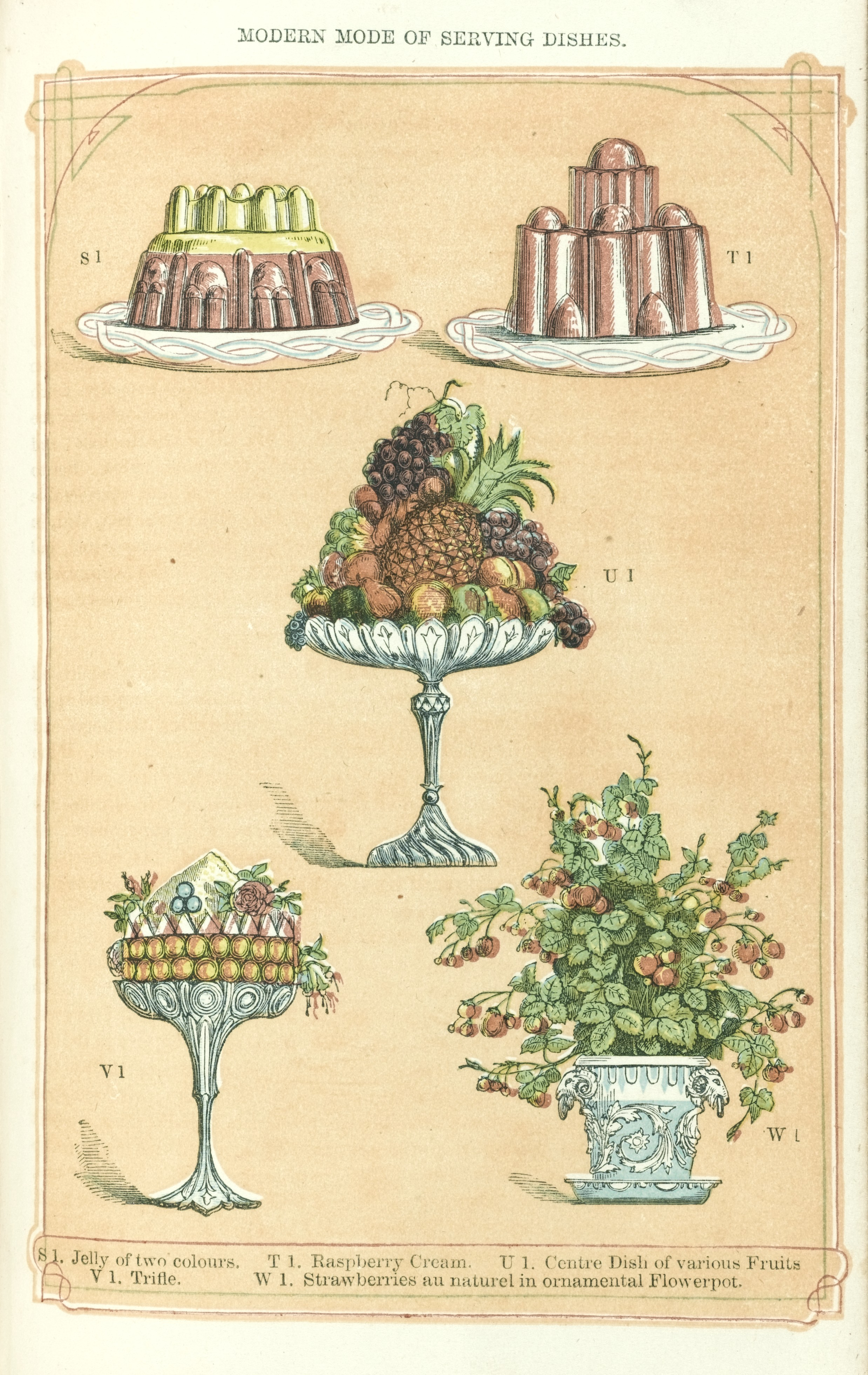
Pineapple appears in a fruit bowl in the dessert section of Mrs. Beeton's Book of Household Management, indicating its adoption by the middle-class.

Lace doily by needleworker Barbett A. Hook with a pineapple pattern in the corner, 1894–1906

Furniture design in the newly formed United States began to branch off from its European progenitors in the 1820s, but continued to incorporate carved pineapple ornamental motifs in the neoclassical style.

== See also ==
- Knowledge spillover

== Bibliography ==
- Avery, Victoria; Calaresu, Melissa (Eds.) (2019). Feast and Fast: The Art of Food in Europe 1500-1800. University of Cambridge. pp. 73-81. ISBN 9781781301029. OCLC 1105148261.
- Beauman, Fran (2006)[2005]. The Pineapple: The King of Fruits. London: Vintage. ISBN 9781446444689. OCLC 935213459.
- Brouwer, Veerle de (2017). "Pineapples, Labyrinths, and Butterflies: Female Collectors in the Dutch Golden Age". (MA thesis). Leiden University. Retrieved April 22, 2024.
- Campbell, Susan (1996). Charleston Kedding: A History of Kitchen Gardening. London: Ebury Press. ISBN 0091813859. OCLC 36120382.
- Carvalho, Teresa Nobre de. (2020). "The Natural Frontiers of a Global Empire: The Pineapple—Ananas comosus—In Portuguese Sources of the 16th Century". Humanities. 9 (3): 89.
- Coe, Sophie D. (2005)[1994]. America's First Cuisines. Austin: University of Texas Press. ISBN 0292711557. OCLC 28294829.
- Cone, Schuyler Eaton; Steiner, Catherine McQuaid (1993). Master of Fancy Needlework: Barnett A. Hook, McArthur, Ohio 1845-1926. pp. 7-8; 26. OCLC 27665414.
- Crews, Patricia Cox; Ducey, Carolyn (2009). Building on a Foundation: Log Cabin Quilts. American Quilts in the Modern Age 1870-1940. University of Nebraska Press. p. 90. ISBN 9780803220546. OCLC 234257226.
- Floud, Roderick (2019). An Economic History of the English Garden. London: Allen Lane. ISBN 9780241235577. OCLC 1128799050.
- Gohmann, Joanna M. (Fall 2018) "Colonizing through Clay: A Case Study of the Pineapple in British Material Culture". Eighteenth-Century Fiction. 31 (1): 143-161.
- Hamati-Ataya, Inanna (2022). "Epistemic demarcations as social erasures: taste and the politics of distinction from the 'revolutions of wisdom' to the 'Green Revolution'". BJHS Themes. 7: 13-38.
- Hyles, Claudia (1998). And the Answer is a Pineapple: The King of Fruit in Folklore, Fabric and Food. Sally Milner Pub. ISBN 9781863512213. OCLC 40839204.
- Jardine, Lisa (1999). Ingenious Pursuits: Building the Scientific Revolution. New York: Nan A. Talese. ISBN 9780385493253. OCLC 41420589.
- Johnson, Lisa (Summer 2019). "Pieter de la Court van der Voort and innovations in pineapple cultivation in early eighteenth-century gardens". Garden History. 47 (1): 23-41.
- Krill, Rosemary Troy (2010). Early American Decorative Arts: 1620–1860. Lanham, Md: AltaMira Press. Winterthur Museum. ISBN 9780759119468. OCLC 664680916.
- Lausen-Higgins, Johanna; Lusby, Phil (2008). "Pineapple Growing: Its Historical Development and the Cultivation of the Victorian Pineapple Pit at the Lost Gardens of Heligan, Cornwall". Sibbaldia: The International Journal of Botanic Garden Horticulture. (6): 29–39.
- Levitt, Ruth (Summer 2014). "'A noble present of fruit': A transatlantic history of pineapple". Garden History. 42 (1): 106-119.
- Ming, Ray (Ed.). (2018). Genetics and Genomics of Pineapple. Plant Genetics and Genomics: Crops and Models. Vol. 22. Cham, Switzerland: Springer. ISBN 9783030006143. OCLC 1076543389.
- O'Connor, Kaori (2013). Pineapple: A Global History. Reaktion Books. ISBN 9781780231792. OCLC 861920384.
- Okihiro, Gary Y. (2009). Pineapple Culture: A History of the Tropical and Temperate Zones. Berkeley: University of California Press. ISBN 0520255135. OCLC 261173660.
- Pavord, Anna (2005). The Naming of Names: The Search for Order in the World of Plants. London: Bloomsbury. ISBN 1596910712. OCLC 62594095.
- Silver, Sean R. (2008). "Locke's Pineapple and the History of Taste". The Eighteenth Century. 49 (1): 43–65. (subscription required)
- Spary, Emma C. (2014). Feeding France: New Sciences of Food, 1760–1815. Vol. 21. Cambridge University Press. ISBN 9781107031050. OCLC 881162777.
- Spence, Charles (March 2023). "Are pineapples really delicious? The history of the pineapple's taste/flavour and the role of varietal and terroir". International Journal of Gastronomy and Food Science. 31 (100682): 1-11.
- Tracy, Berry B. (1970). "Introduction". In Johnson, M., Schwartz, M. D., Boorsch, S. (Ed.). 19th-century America: Furniture and Other Decorative Arts: An Exhibition in Celebration of the Hundredth Anniversary of the Metropolitan Museum of Art. April 16 Through September 7, 1970. United States: Metropolitan Museum of Art. OCLC 316859017.
- Van Dyk, Garritt (2022). "Plants as Luxury Foods". In Milam, Jennifer (Ed.). A Cultural History of Plants in the Seventeenth and Eighteenth Centuries. Vol. 4. London: Bloomsbury Academic. pp. 51-68. ISBN 9781474273497. OCLC 1402246090.
- Woods, May; Warren, Arete Swartz (1990)[1988]. Glass Houses: A History of Greenhouses, Orangeries and Conservatories. London: Aurum Press. ISBN 1854101137. OCLC 1854101137.
