= Tupinambá =

Tupinambá may refer to:

- Tupinambá people
- Tupinambá language
