= Agnen =

Evil spirit in Amazonian mythology

Agnen is an evil spirit in Amazonian Tupinambá mythology. He plays a role in the myth of the Twins, devouring one before being beaten by the other.
