= Tearful salutation =

Practice common among various indigenous groups in the Americas

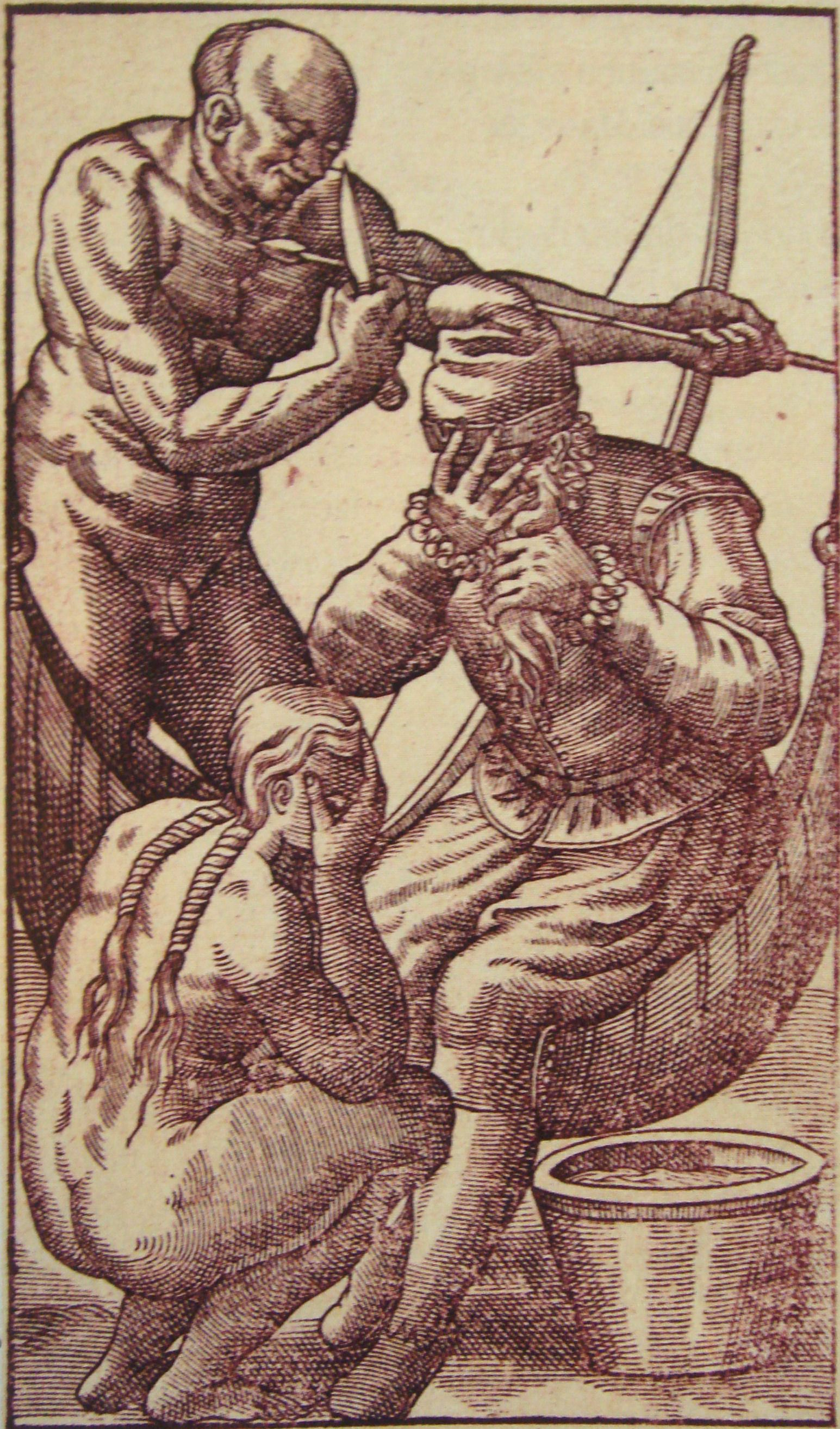
Tearful salutation in the French book History of a Voyage to the Land of Brazil

Tearful salutation or tearful greeting (Note: French: salutation larmoyante; German: Tränengruss; Portuguese: saudação lacrimosa) refers to a practice common among various indigenous groups in the Americas. Documented prominently among the Tupinambás, it involves a tearful ceremony when a foreigner or absent tribe member arrives in the village.

== Distribution ==
The tearful salutation in South America was limited to the region east of the Andes. According to Alfred Métraux, it was the Tupi people who spread this custom. In relation to North America, the habit was widespread in the region between the headwaters of the Mississippi River and the coast of Texas, especially among the Kaddö group and the Sioux Indians. Georg Friederici reported finding evidence of the tearful salutation in Central America. Outside the American continent, it is observed in the Andaman Islands, Australia (in Queensland), and New Zealand.

== Description ==
Among the Tupinambá people, the tearful salutation occurred when a foreigner or a tribe member absent for more than four days approached the host's dwelling. The guest would then lie down in a hammock; subsequently, the women of the dwelling gathered around, embracing him, placing their hands on his shoulders, neck, and knees, and covering his face with their hair. Squatting down, they would finally start to cry, sobbing and reciting speeches in rhymed prose. According to Claude d'Abbeville, they mentioned the guest was welcome and should be esteemed. According to Yves d'Évreux, they also recalled the ancestors. Fernão Cardim stated they commented on what had happened while they were apart, imagining the difficulties the guest might have faced on the way. The guest had the obligation to cry as well, or at least cover his face and sigh. The crying only ceased upon request, which, however, was considered impolite. When the practice finally ended, a common greeting was heard: "ereîupe?" (lit. 'have you come?').

The tearful salutation was also observed in various other indigenous groups, such as the Charruas and the Lenguas. Among the Guaranis, the practice was exactly the same as that of the Tupinambás. Karl von den Steinen observed two Jurunas greeting each other with tears. Fritz Krause found the existence of the tearful salutation among the Carajás and the Kaiapós as well; relatives, upon meeting, remain silent and avoid looking at each other for a few minutes, and women cry for a brief period of time. The Oiampis, when encountering someone who has been absent for some time, turn their backs and remain silent for about ten minutes, indicating a trace of the practice. Jivaro women sing funeral songs when receiving outsiders.

== Interpretation ==
Georg Friederici interprets the tearful salutation as an expression of sympathy for the guest, who would have faced dangers to visit the host. For Rafael Karsten, the custom would be an expression of pain caused by memories of deceased relatives, awakened by the visit. Alfred Métraux suggests some connection with the cult of the dead.

== Bibliography ==
- Harbsmeier, Michael (1988). "Why Do the Indians Cry?". Etnofoor. 1 (1): 57–77. JSTOR 25757649.
- Métraux, Alfred (1979). A religião dos tupinambás e suas relações com a das demais tribos tupi-guaranis (in Portuguese) (2nd ed.). São Paulo: Editora Nacional. Archived from the original on 30 May 2023.
