= Jean de Léry =

French cleric and explorer (1536–1613)

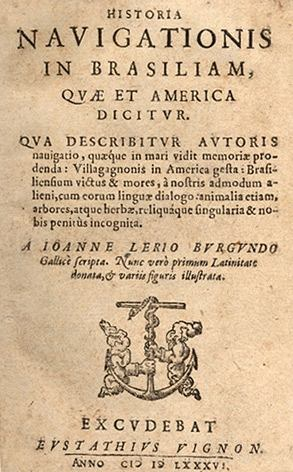
Title page of the Latin translation of de Léry's book, Historia Navigationis in Brasiliam, quae et America Dicitur (History of a Voyage to the Land of Brazil, Also Called America).

Jean de Léry (1534/1536–1613) was an explorer, writer, and Reformed pastor born in Lamargelle, Côte-d'Or, France. Scholars disagree about whether he was a member of the lesser nobility or merely a shoemaker. Either way, he was not a public figure prior to accompanying a small group of fellow Protestants to their new colony on an island in the Bay of Rio de Janeiro, Brazil from 1557 to 1558. There he produced the first known transcriptions of native American music: two chants of the Tupinambá, near Rio de Janeiro. The colony, France Antarctique was founded by the Chevalier de Villegaignon, with promises of religious freedom, but on arrival, the Chevalier contested the Protestants' beliefs and persecuted them. After eight months, the Protestants left their colony and survived for a short time on the mainland, living amongst the Tupinambá Indians. These events were the basis of de Lery's book, History of a Voyage to the Land of Brazil (1578). Exhausted and starving, they then returned to France aboard a pirate ship.

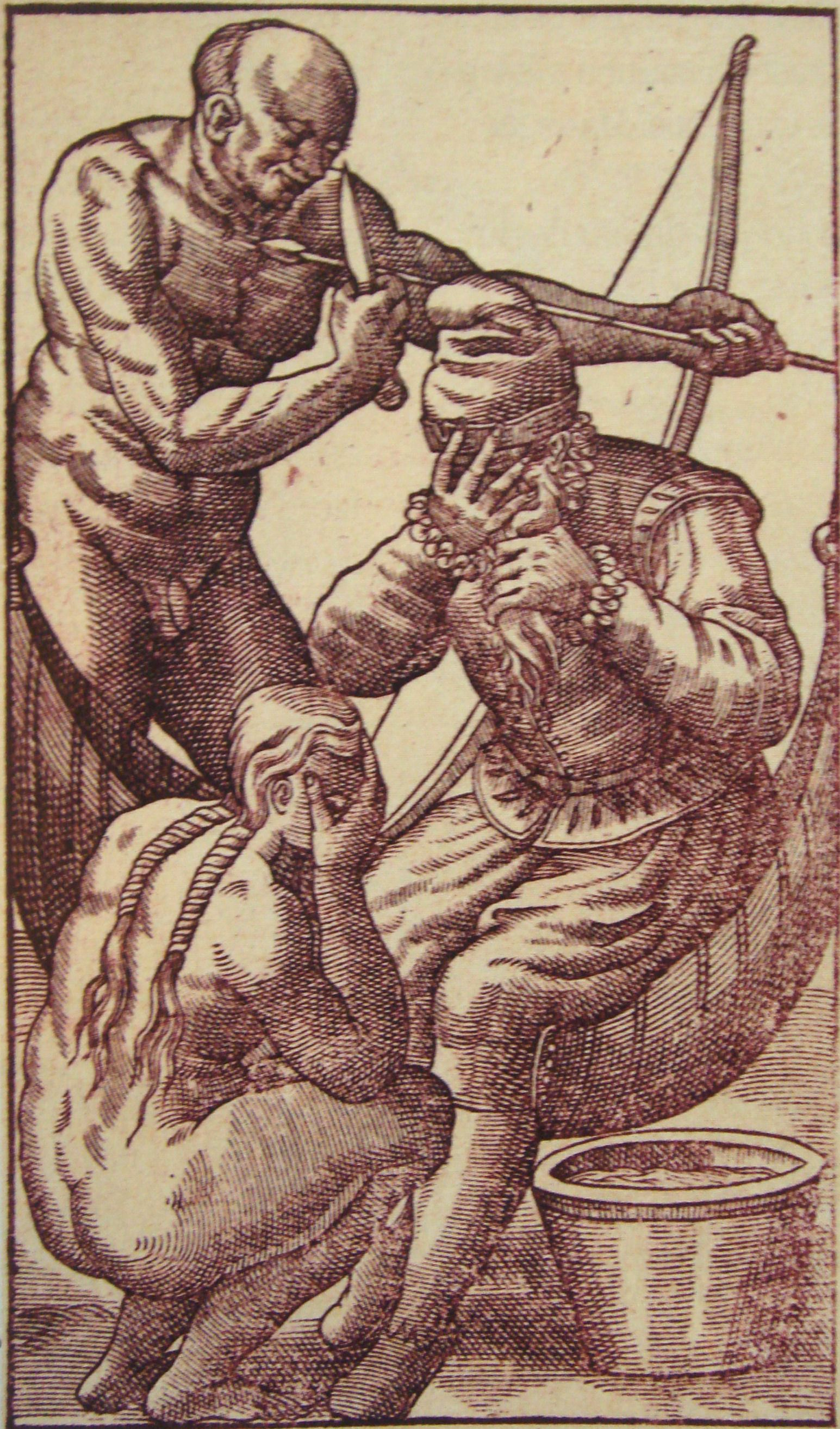
"Salutations larmoyantes" ("Tearful salutations"), in Histoire d'un voyage faict en la terre du Brésil (1578), Jean de Léry, 1580 edition.

Throughout this book, Léry describes his voyage across the Atlantic to Brazil. On the way he encounters never before seen ocean wildlife that foreshadows many more discoveries to follow. While on the ship he and his men develop new skills of judging and navigating the winds, stars, currents, and tides. Upon arrival, Léry and his men are exposed to what seems to be an entirely new world. Throughout the body, the crew encounters a wide variety of people in an area not yet affected by European colonization. With the main goals set by the Protestant Reformation, these men face many more challenges than expected, however make discoveries and encounter new things beyond their wildest dreams. Léry witnessed the Tupinambá engage in war and cannibalize their enemies.

On his return to France, de Léry married unhappily and became a Protestant minister. He endured and chronicled the Siege of Sancerre, remarking in his book, History of the City of Sancerre (1574) that his hardships in Brazil served him well, because he taught his fellow soldiers to make hammocks and eat anything, including shoe soles (though cannibalism still repelled him).

During the siege of Sancerre, a Calvinist married couple and an old woman were caught boiling the couple's dead daughter in a cauldron for food. Léry devoted the tenth chapter of his account of the siege to describing and evaluating this episode of European Protestant cannibalism. Historian Adam Asher Duker has argued that Léry equated the residents of Sancerre with the cannibalistic Israelites of the Old Testament, and that he believed his own Huguenot community to be the worst of all cannibals, as they ate each other despite their highest understanding of the will of God.

== Works ==
- L'histoire mémorable du siège et de la famine de Sancerre (1573)
- Histoire d'un voyage fait en la terre de Brésil (1578)

== Honors ==
In 1829, botanist José Mariano de Conceição Vellozo published a genus of flowering plants from South America, belonging to the family Icacinaceae, as Leretia in his honor.
