= The New Found World, or Antarctike =

1557 book by André de Thevet

The New found world, or Antarctike
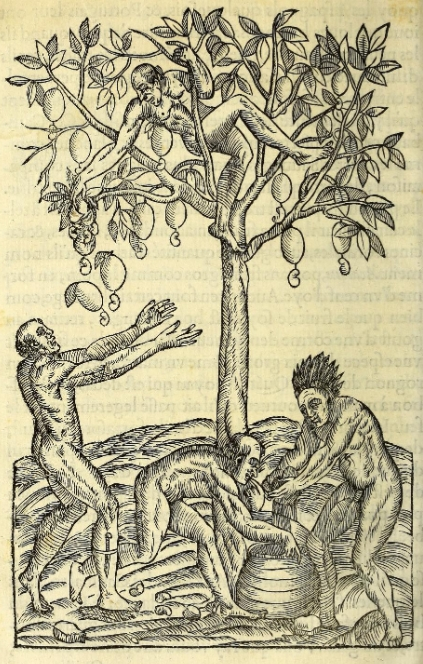
- Author: André Thevet
- Original title: Les singularitez de la France antarctique
- Publisher: Imprinted by Henry Bynneman, for Thomas Hacket
- Publication date: 1568

The New Found World, or Antarctike is the English title of an account first published in French in 1557 by the French Franciscan priest and explorer André Thevet after his experiences in France Antarctique, a French settlement in modern Rio de Janeiro.

Although the book is purportedly based on his firsthand experiences in South America, Thevet used a number of other accounts such that the work remains valuable for the ethnography of both eastern Canada and Brazil. His account of cannibalism was influential on Montaigne and the text contains the first descriptions in European texts of a number of South American plants and animals.

== Historical context ==
The first French colonization of Brazil was in 1555 when Nicolas Durand de Villegaignon sailed a fleet to Guanabara Bay, now Rio de Janeiro, to establish France Antarctique. Fort Coligny was built there and used by the French for slave trading of the Tupinambá people. The Tupinambá suffered considerable mortality after exposure to infectious disease. The colony lasted until 1560 when the Portuguese gained control of Fort Coligny from the French.

== Composition and reception ==
Thevet sailed to France Antarctique in 1555 as the chaplain of the Villegaignon fleet. Thevet arrived there on 10 November 1555 but only stayed in the colony for about 10 weeks before returning to France.

In the composition of the text, Thevet made use of a variety of previous published sources, but also verbal accounts from other explorers and sailors, and from indigenous Canadians who had been brought back to France. Thevet later settled a court case with another scholar who claimed to have been responsible for the actual writing.

An edition of Les singularitez de la France Antarctique was printed in Antwerp by Plantin in 1558 and quickly spread throughout Europe after its publication. Europeans at the time considered Thevet's work as an unusual contribution to travel literature. In 1568, the book was translated into an English version, titled

The New found vvorlde, or antarctike, wherein is contained woderful and strange things, as well of humaine creatures, as beastes, fishes, foules, and serpents, trees, plants, mines of golde and siluer: garnished with many learned aucthorities, trauailed and written in the French tong, by that excellent learned man, Master Andrevve Thevet, and now newly translated into Englishe, wherein is reformed the errours of the auncient cosmographer.

An Italian edition was also published with the title Historia dell'India America detta altramente Francia Antartica, di M. Andre; tradotta di francese in lingva italiana.

The text contains the first descriptions in European texts of plants such as the manioc, pineapples, peanuts and tobacco, as well as of the animals macaw, sloth and tapir, and an account of cannibalism that influenced Montaigne.

== Synopsis ==
Thevet and his colleagues land on the Brazilian mainland on November 10, and are welcomed and fed by a delegation of native people immediately upon their arrival. At the welcoming feast, they are served an alcoholic beverage brewed from a combination of different roots. Initially hoping to venture inland or elsewhere along the coast, the expeditionary team members are informed that there is little freshwater for a significant distance away from the indigenous settlement but that they would be welcome to remain near their landing site for the time being. Venturing to a nearby inlet, Thevet and company are impressed by an array of colorful birdsㅡtheir feathers making an attractive decoration for the sparse garments of native peopleㅡand a generous bounty of fish, upon which local residents may subsist. Finally Thevet describes some of the local flora, including beautiful trees unseen in Europe and small vines utilized by the natives as accessories and for medicinal purposes. Thevet describes a fruit which the Tupinambá call the Hoyriri:

an other fruit that commeth vp in the fieldes, which they name Hoyriri, the which to loke on, would be iudged to grow on some trée. Notwithstāding it groweth in a certaine herbe that beareth leafe like to a Palme, as wel in the length as in largenesse, it groweth in the midst of the leaues very round, & within it be litle Nuts, of the which the kernell is white & good to eate, sauing that ouermuch therof, as wel as of other things, hurteth the braine. … if … dressed & trimmed, it wold take away this vice. Notwithstanding the Americanes eat therof, chiefly y^{e} litle childrē. The fields ar very ful within two leagues of Cap de Fria.

This fruit has been mistakenly identified by some as the pineapple, but it is more likely that Thevet was describing the fruit of the babassu palm.

The Catholic author acknowledges and laments the absence of organized religion in the lives of indigenous people. Although they do believe in "Toupan"ㅡsome sort of higher being reigning above them and governing the climateㅡthey make no clear effort to worship or honor it as a collective. When spoken to of God, the natives ask whether he had been the "Charaiba," or prophet, who had shown their people how to plant "Hetich," a root that became a staple of their diet. Thevet then digresses from this point, describing some alternative properties of the roots that emerge once separate varieties are subjected to certain external forces. Following this, the author momentarily touches upon how Christopher Columbus and his team were initially worshiped by local Amerindians, before losing this divine status once it was gradually discovered that they behaved and functioned as ordinary men. Cannibalism is addressed at the end of this chapter, being attributed to certain indigenous groups who allegedly consume human flesh as one in European society might consume any other meat.

Thevet also describes the rarity of clothing in the aboriginal society he and his companions observe. Almost without exception, men and women alike would live their entire lives completely naked. Deviations from this norm might occur at formal events, at which attendees might wear sashes or headdresses. Additionally, elderly people might cover their breasts and genitalia out of an apparent desire to hide their physical deterioration wrought by the aging process. However, it is also notable that these indigenous villagers placed a great deal of value in the garments that they made or otherwise encountered. Rather than wear these articles of clothing, the natives would frequently set them aside for fear of degrading their quality. In those instances when they did choose to wear attire, the Amerindians would always do so on a part of their body where it could easily be prevented from touching the ground at any time. Noting their ability to weave cotton for other purposes, Thevet deduces that the natives likely embrace nudity as a way for them to move and fight with agility.

In Chapter 46, Thevet describes diseases and their treatments and mentions the pineapple, calling it the Nana:

The fruite of which they commonly eate in their sicknesses is named Naua, being great, made in maner of a Pine apple, thys fruite when it waxeth ripe, becommeth yelow, the which is very excellent, as wel for his swetenesse as his relish, as pleasant as fine suger and more: It is not possible to bring of them into this countrey, but conserued, for being ripe they will not long kéepe. Furthermore, it beareth no grain, wherfore they plāt them by litle slippes, as the fruites that are grafted in our countrey: Also before it be ripe, it is so roughe in eating, that it will pull of the skinne of your lips: the leafe of this trée when it groweth, is like to the leafe of a large Iounck or sags.

Thevet describes a method of execution which he claims is practiced by the coastal community in which he resides. Condemned men, typically war prisoners, are given comfortable lodging, plenty of food, and even a "wife" for the period of time leading from the beginning of their internment to their deaths. The experience of captured women differed in that they were afforded greater mobility, but were also required to perform agricultural work and to gather fish. The unit of time throughout this period is the moon, rather than days, weeks, or months. On the final day before his or her execution, the prisoner is chained to a bed and is the subject of a ceremony in which community members gather and sing of his or her death. Finally, the condemned man or woman is brought to a public place, tied up, hacked to pieces, and consumed by the local populace. Male children are told to bathe in the blood of the victim, while women are tasked with eating the internal organs. All children born to a condemned man's "widow" as a result of their copulation are to be "nurtured" for a brief period, before being cannibalized in the same manner as their father. The executioners, meanwhile, are honored and brilliantly accessorized with colorful feathers and body paint.
