= Tupinambá people =

Tupi people of northern and eastern Brazil

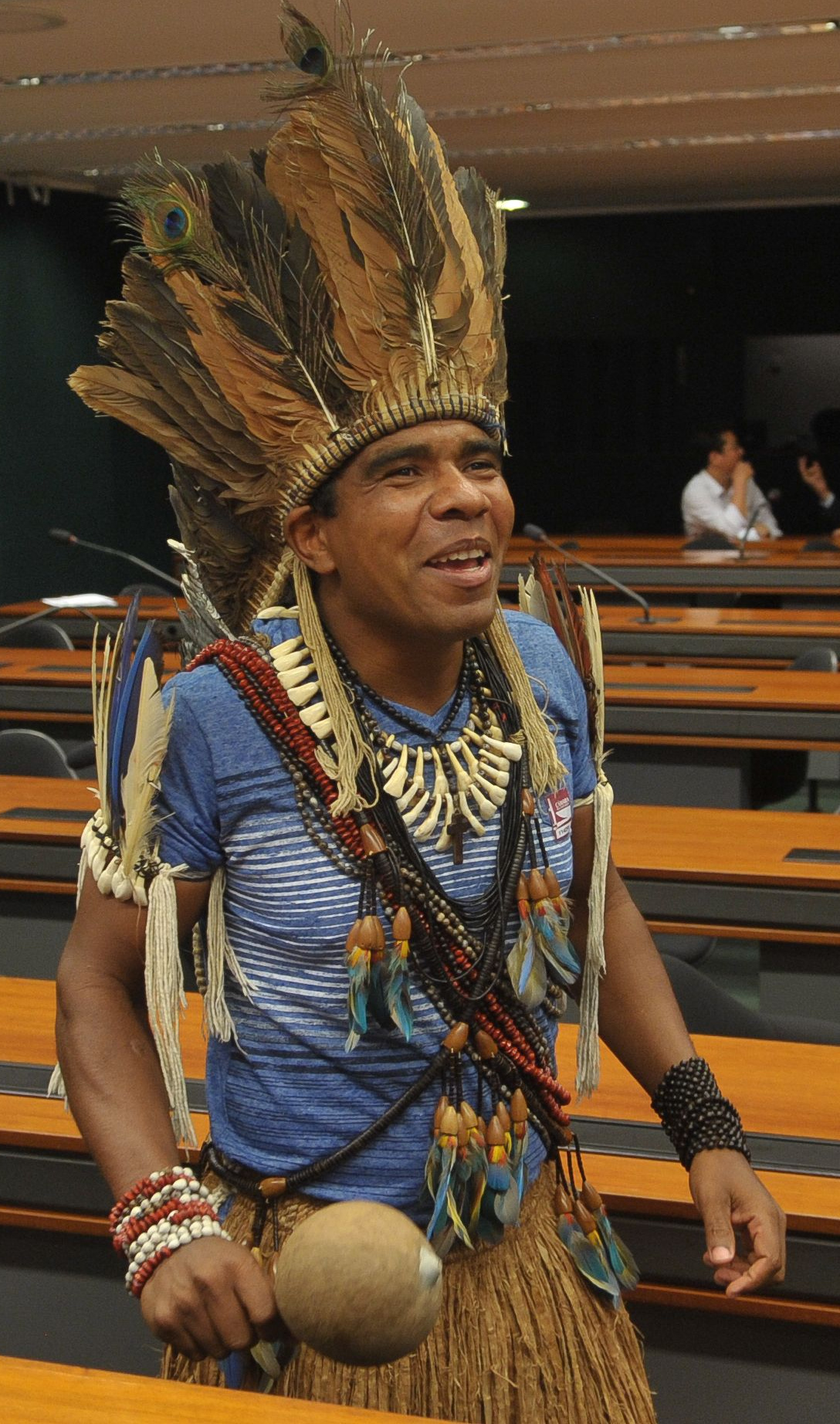
- Babau Tupinambá, a cacique of the Tupinambá

Regions with significant populations
- Pará

Languages
- Nheengatu language, Tupi language

Related ethnic groups
- Tupiniquim, Potiguara, Caeté, Tabajara, and Tamoio

The Tupinambá (plural: Tupinambás) are one of the various Tupi ethnic groups that inhabit present-day Brazil, and who had been living there long before the conquest of the region by Portuguese colonial settlers. The name Tupinambá was also applied to other Tupi-speaking groups, such as the Tupiniquim, Potiguara, Caeté, Tabajara, and Tamoio. Before and during their first contact with the Portuguese, the Tupinambás had been living along the entire Eastern Atlantic coast of Brazil.

In a sense, the name can be applied exclusively to the Tupinambás who once inhabited the right shore of the São Francisco River (in the Recôncavo Baiano, Bahia), and from the Cabo de São Tomé (in Rio de Janeiro) to the town of São Sebastião (in São Paulo). Their language survives today in the form of Nheengatu.

In the 21st century, the Tupinambá people live in Pará, and the southern region of Bahia, around Olivença, Alagoas. The Tupinambás of Olivença's fight for land recognition started in 2005, and reclaimed about 90 farms. The following year, they opened brand-new indigenous schools, with their own curriculum, language, and teaching methods, in 2006.

== History ==
Ceramic fragments of Tupinambá origin, found in Morro Grande, currently housed at the Araruama Cultural Center.

Hundreds of years before the arrival of the Portuguese, the Tupinambá are said to have migrated from the South coast of Brazil to the Northern coast for the sake of better hunting and agricultural opportunities. From here they settled into communities that would sustain a population of about 100 people. The size and strength of the communities made them infamous in combat, but left them with very few alliances. The Tupinambá originally helped the Portuguese in enslaving other native populations, but the Portuguese eventually started to go after the Tupinambá as well. It was in part due to this lack of alliances that the Portuguese were able to conquer the group.

The Tupinambás were abundantly described in André Thevet's 1572 Cosmographie universelle (English: The New Found World, or Antarctike), in Jean de Léry's Histoire d'un voyage faict en la terre du Brésil (English: History of a Voyage to the Land of Brazil) (1578), and Hans Staden's Warhaftige Historia und beschreibung eyner Landtschafft der Wilden Nacketen (English: True History: An Account of Cannibal Captivity in Brazil, lit. ... of a Landscape of the Wild Naked People), in which he describes the Tupinamba practicing cannibalism. Thevet and Léry were an inspiration for Montaigne's famous essay Of Cannibals, and influenced the creation of the myth of the "noble savage" during the Enlightenment.

The Tupinambá may have given their name to the common French word for the Jerusalem artichoke, the topinambour.

== Cultural practices ==
The Tupinambá were a group reliant upon agriculture for most of their resources, using the slash-and-burn technique in their practice. Both women and men were known to work in the fields, with the women often being the ones to till the soil before men would carry out their duties. However, the Tupinambá weren't limited to farming. They were known to hunt, fish, and gather resources as well, though not to the extent of their agricultural labors.

== Demographics ==
There are two remaining regions inhabited by the Tupinambá. The Tupinambá of Olivença live in the Atlantic Forest region of southern Bahia. Its area is 10 kilometers north of the city of Ilhéus and extends from the sea coast of the village of Olivença to the Serra das Trempes and Serra do Padeiro. The other group lives in the low Tapajós in the Brazilian state of Pará.

== Tupinambá of Olivença ==
=== Land ===
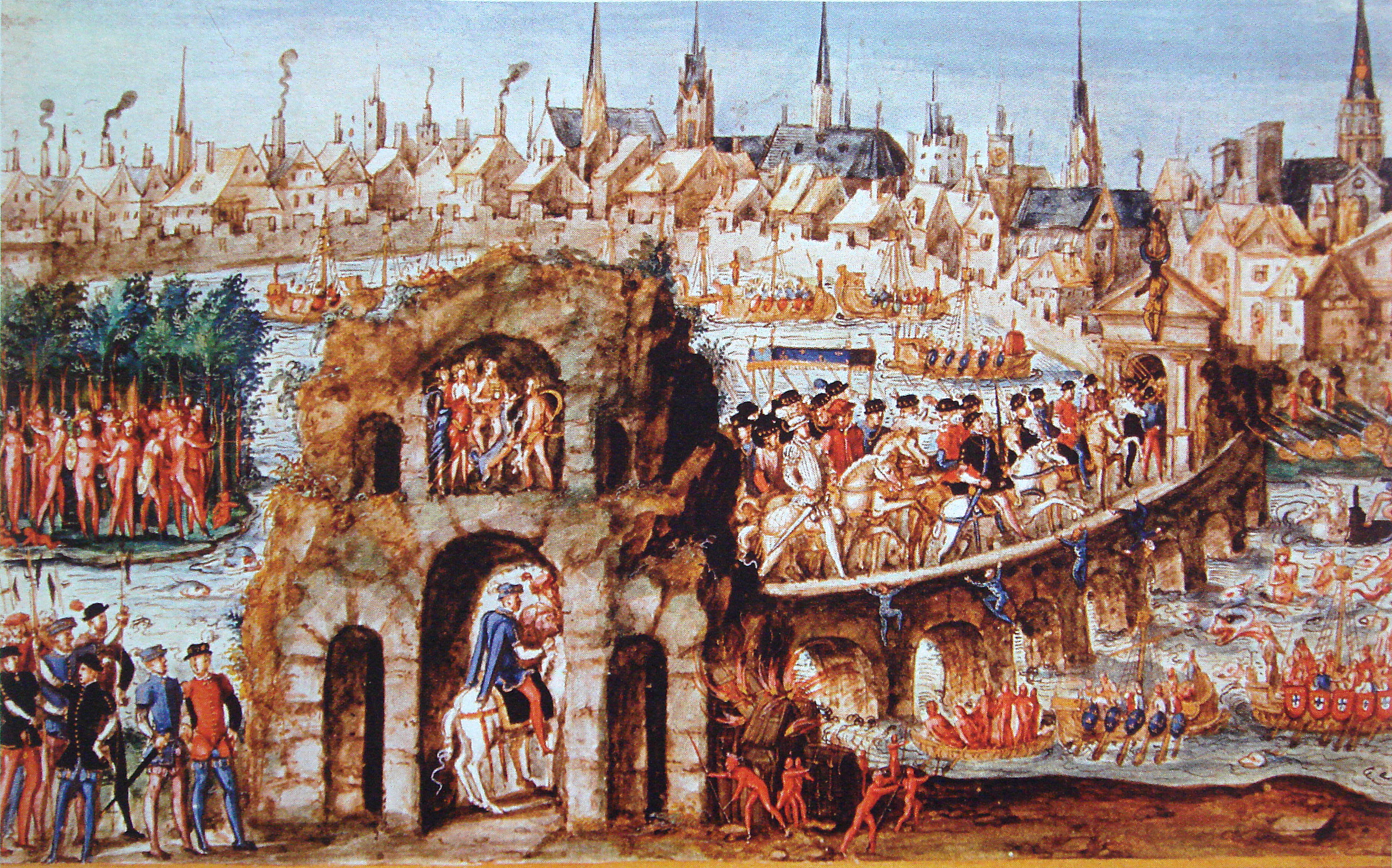
The France Antarctique (Brazilian ball) for Henry II of France in Rouen, 1 October 1550. Over 300 nude men were employed to illustrate life in Brazil, and a mock battle between the Tupinambá allies of the French and the Tabajara people.

The Brazilian government officially recognized the Tupinambá as indigenous people in 2002. In 2005, the National Indigenous People Foundation (FUNAI), which implements indigenous rights into the Federal government, created a technical group to define the 47,376 acres of territory occupied by the Tupinambá of Olivença as an indigenous land (Terra Indígena, in Portuguese). FUNAI approved the report in 2009, which arrived at the Federal Ministry of Justice in 2012. The Tupinambá of Olivença living in Serra do Padeiro reclaimed about 90 farms between 2004 and 2016 as indigenous lands.

A governmental proposal puts the Tupinambá of Olivença and other indigenous reclaimed lands at risk. In May 2023, the Brazilian House of Representatives approved the Marco Temporal project, which limits the demarcation of indigenous lands. It states that indigenous peoples only have claim to the land they occupied during the 1988 Constitution promulgation, meaning they can be removed from where they reside now if they cannot prove they permanently lived there in 1988. Farmers advocate for the project, since it defends private property. The project also threatens indigenous communities and their land. The Brazilian Supreme Federal Court declared the project to be unconstitutional on September 21, 2023. The declaration was overruled by the senate a week later. President Lula can still sanction or ban the project as of October 2023.

=== Education ===
With the land demarcation movement in progress, the Tupinambá were able to exert their constitutional right to differentiated indigenous education. As written in the 1988 Brazilian Constitution, indigenous peoples can use their mother tongue and own teaching methods in schools. The first indigenous-teaching school in Tupinambá indigenous land, the Escola Estadual Indígina Tupinambá de Olivença (EEITO), was created in 2002 and opened in 2006. The second school implemented was the Escola Estadual Indígena Tupinambá Serra do Padeiro (EEITSP), called Colégio Estadual Indígena Tupinambá Serra do Padeiro (CEITSP) since 2015, which was first an annex to EEITO and opened in Serra do Padeiro. Both indigenous and non-indigenous people attend the school. It promotes social interactions between indigenous and non-indigenous, in an effort to maintain Tupinambá identity and fight intolerance.

== Gallery ==
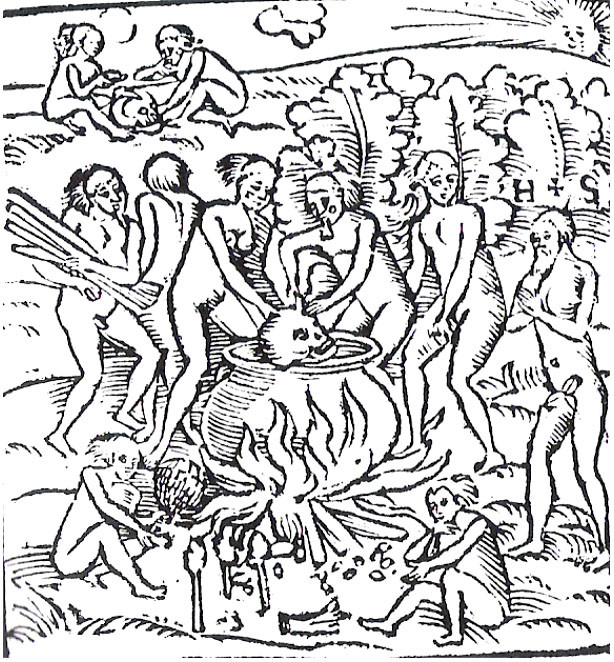
Original 1557 Hans Staden woodcut of the Tupinambá portrayed in a cannibalistic feast.

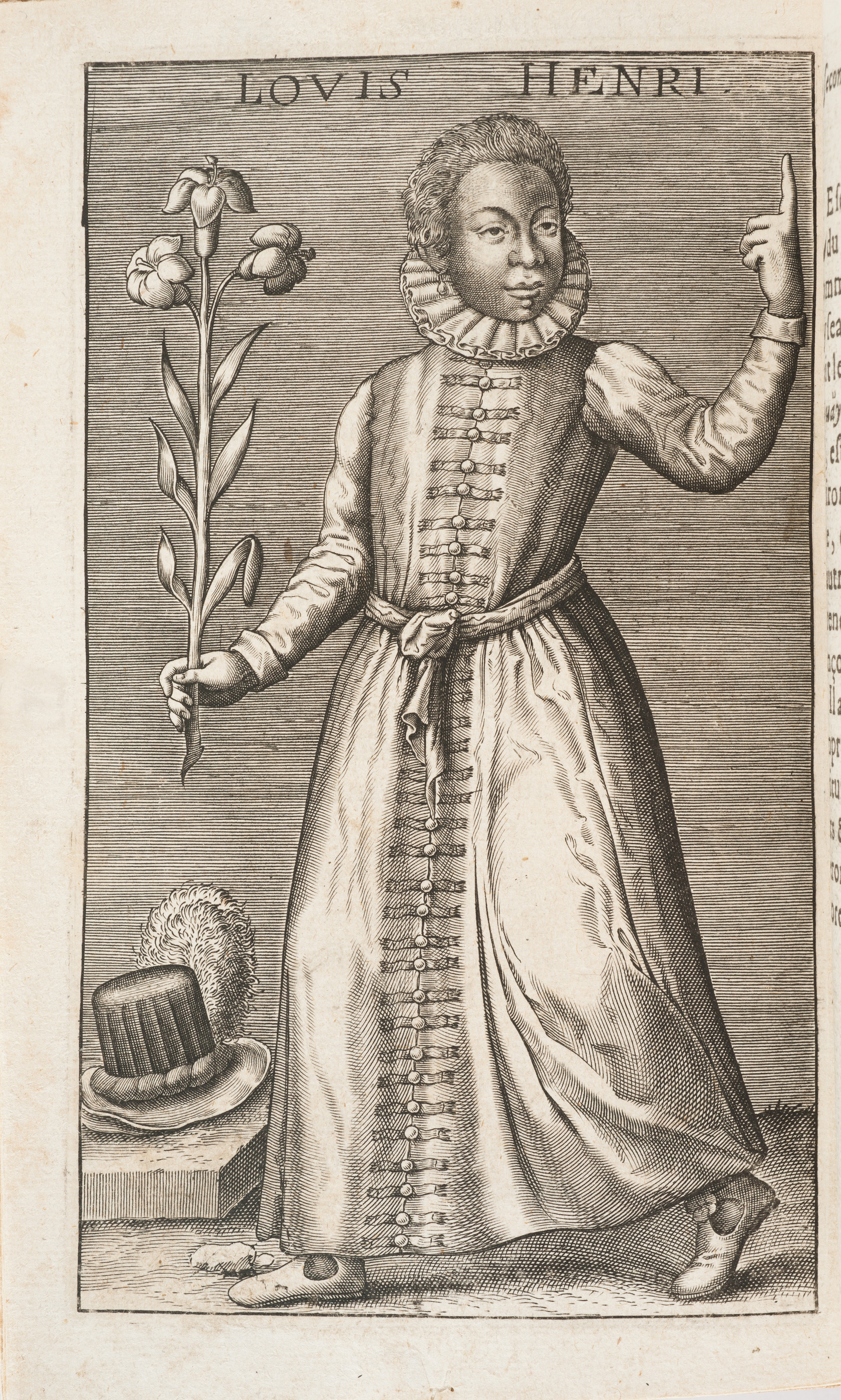
A Tupinambá named "Louis Henri" who visited Louis XIII in Paris in 1613, in Claude d'Abbeville, Histoire de la mission.

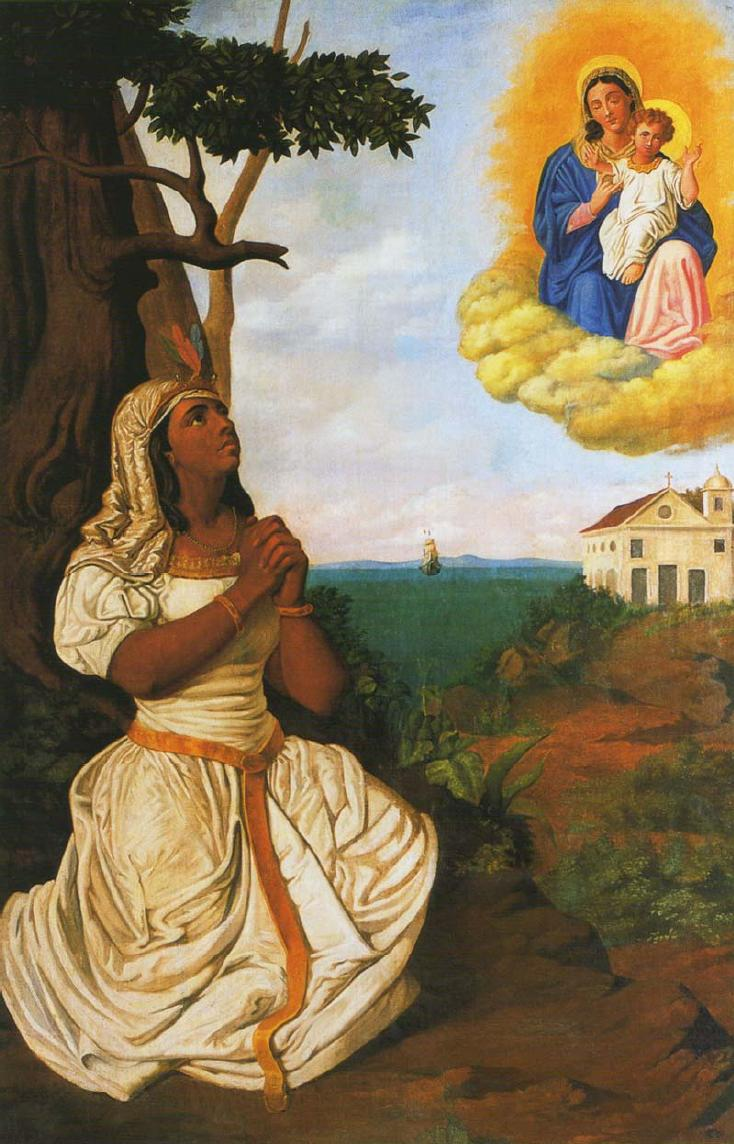
Catarina Paraguaçu, wife of Portuguese sailor Diogo Álvares Correia, in an 1871 painting.

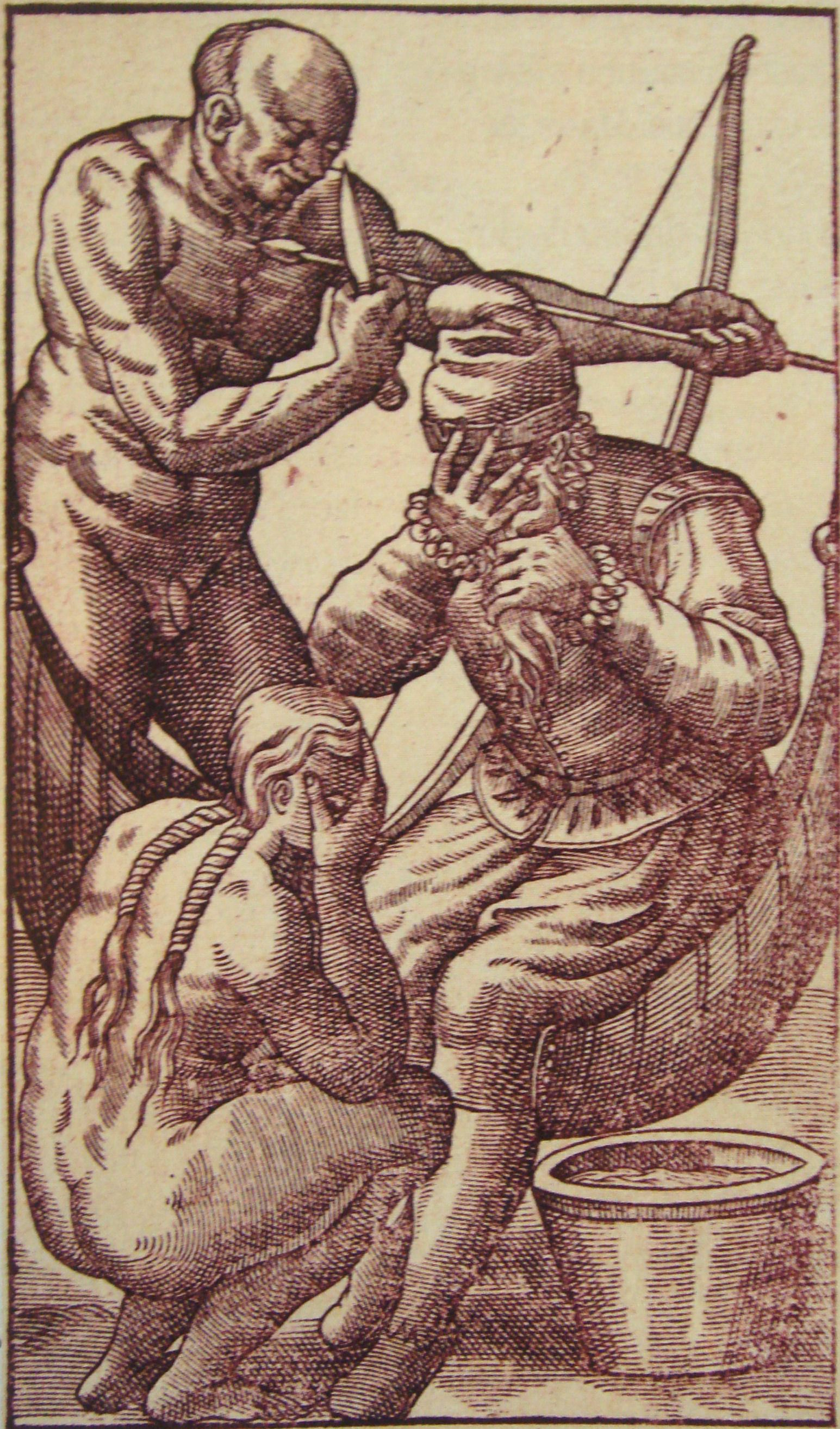
"Salutations larmoyantes" ("Tearful salutations") describing the Tupinambás, in Histoire d'un voyage faict en la terre du Brésil (1578), Jean de Léry, 1580 edition.

== See also ==
- Cannibalism in the Americas

== Sources ==
- Léry, Jean, and Janet Whatley. History of a Voyage to the Land of Brazil, Otherwise Called America. Berkeley: University of California Press, 1990. Print.
- Ferraz Gerardi, Fabrício "A Role and Reference Grammar Description of Tupinambá": Tübingen Library Press, 2023.
