= André Thevet =

French priest, writer and explorer (1516–1590)

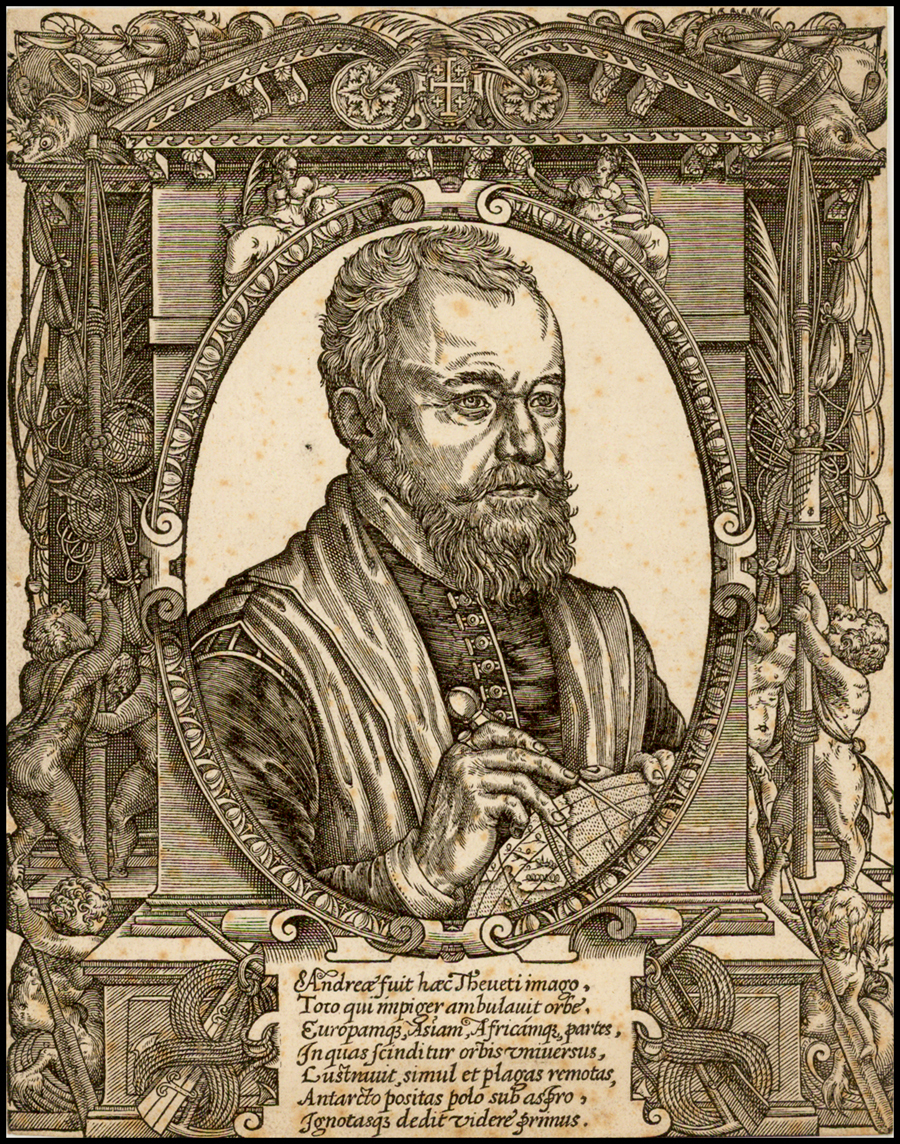
André Thevet, c. 1550

André Thevet, OFM (/təˈveɪ/; French: [təvɛ]; 1516 – 23 November 1590) was a French Franciscan priest, explorer, cosmographer and writer who travelled to the Near East and South America. His most significant book was The New Found World, or Antarctike, which compiled a number of different sources and his own experience into what purported to be a firsthand account of his experiences in France Antarctique, a French settlement near modern Rio de Janeiro.

== Life ==
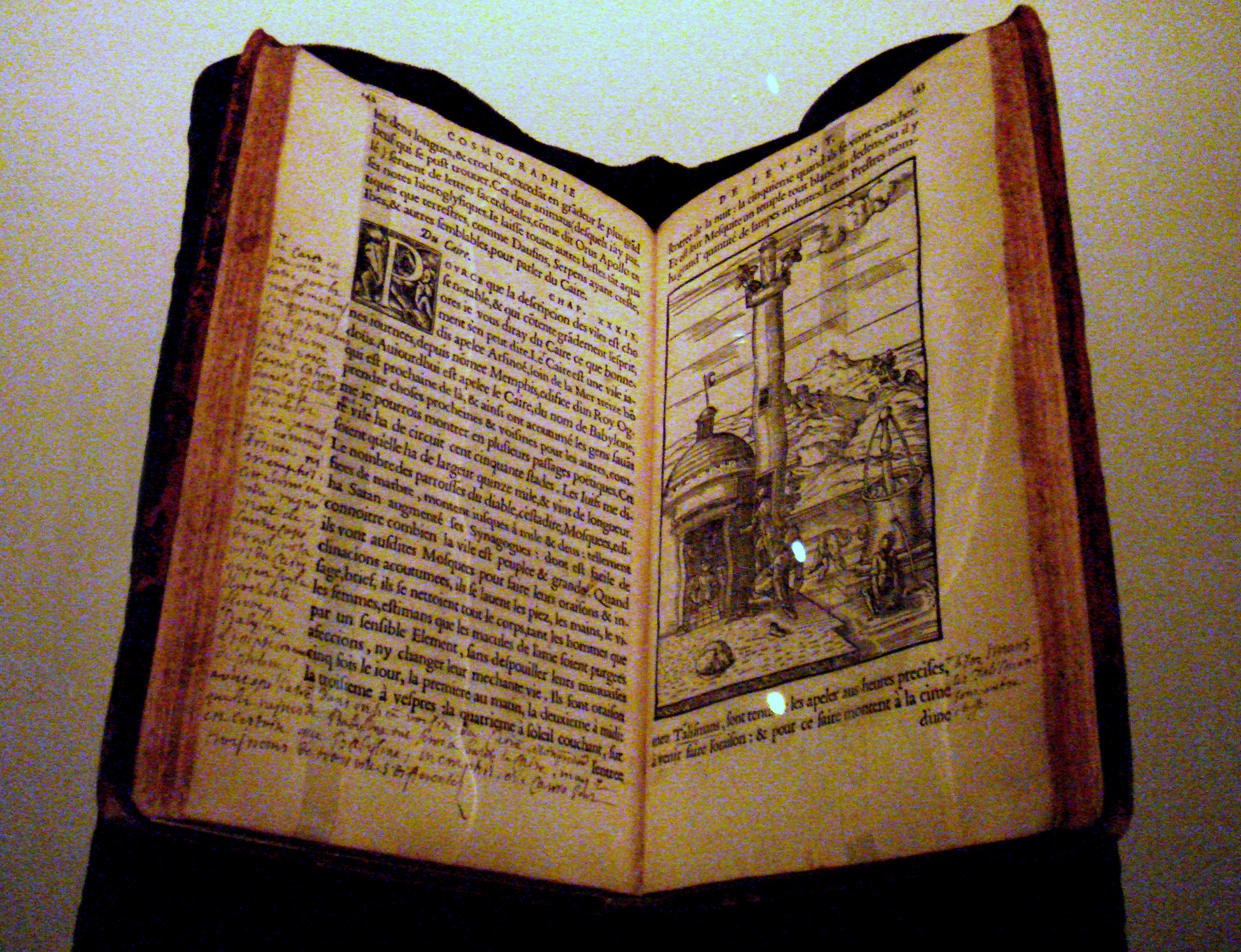
André Thevet Cosmographie du Levant, 1556, Lyon.

Very little is known about the early life of Thevet. He was born about 1516 in Angoulême, France, the son of Etienne Thevet, a barber-surgeon. At ten years of age, he was placed, against his will, into the Franciscan monastery at Angoulême. With the support of the powerful La Rochefoucauld family, he received a university education in Paris and Poitiers. Thevet then received an appointment as private secretary to the cardinal of Amboise. In the 1540s, he made several trips to Italy, Switzerland, Naples and Africa.

With the patronage of Cardinal Jean de Lorraine, Thevet embarked on an extended exploration of the Levant, sailing from Venice in June 1549. In November 1549 he toured Constantinople with the Genoese ambassador. Then Thevet joined French naturalist Pierre Gilles to search for antiquities in Istanbul, Rhodes, Athens and Alexandria. He also traveled to Lebanon, Arabia, and Malta before returning home.

Almost immediately after the expedition, he set sail again as the chaplain of the fleet of Nicolas Durand de Villegaignon, which intended to establish a French colony near what is now Rio de Janeiro in Brazil. Thevet arrived at the colony on 10 November 1555, but only stayed for about 10 weeks before returning to France.

He was made an almoner to Catherine de Médici and later was employed by the king.

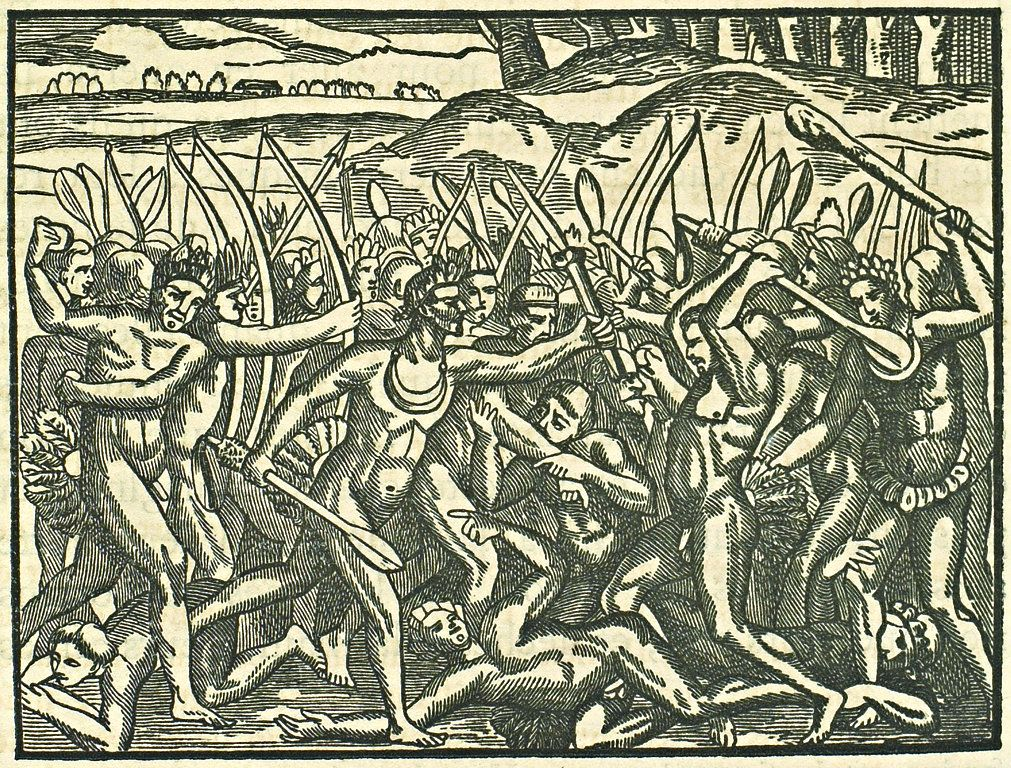
An image of indigenous tribes in Brazil battling each other in André Thevet's Les singularitez de la France Antarctique (1557)

Thevet inaccurately claimed in his Histoire de deux voyages to have accompanied Guillaume Le Testu to America in 1550.

Thevet died in Paris on 23 November 1590.

== Works ==
Soon after Thevet's return to France from the Near East in 1554, he published an account of his voyage under the title Cosmographie du Levant.

On his return from the Americas, Thevet published a book titled Les singularitez de la France Antarctique in 1557. Although purportedly based on his own firsthand experiences, Thevet also used previous published sources, as well as verbal accounts from other explorers and sailors and from indigenous Canadians who had been brought back to France. Thevet later settled a court case with another scholar, who claimed to have been responsible for the actual writing. An edition was printed in Antwerp by Plantin in 1558, and an English edition, The New Found World, or Antarctike, was printed in 1568.

Thevet's use of such a variety of sources not otherwise printed, despite the considerable errors and contradictions, means that his work remains valuable for the ethnography of Eastern Canada and Brazil . Les singularitez de la France Antarctique contains the first descriptions in European texts of plants such as the manioc, pineapple, peanut and tobacco, as well as animals, such as macaw, sloth and tapir. The text also includes an account of cannibalism that was one of the influences on Montaigne's essay on cannibalism.

Once Thevet was established as cosmographer to the French court, he compiled his Cosmographie Universelle, intended to describe every part of the known world. A dispute arose with a collaborator, François de Belleforest, who left Thevet's employ to publish his own Cosmographie in 1572 before Thevet's work finally appeared in 1575.

In 1584, Thevet published a collection of biographies, Les vrais pourtraits et vies des hommes illustres, which was critical of Protestantism. He left two unpublished manuscripts. One, Grand Insulaire, was an almanac of islands, and the other, Histoire de deux voyages, was an account of his travels.

== Bibliography ==
- 1554 Cosmographie de Levant. Lyon : Ian de Tournes et Guil. Gazeau,
- 1557/8 Les singularitez de la France Antarctique (in English in 1568 as The New found vvorlde, or Antarctike)
- 1575 La Cosmographie Universelle d'Andre Thevet Cosmographe dv Roy. Illvstree de diverses figvres des choses plvs remarqvables veves par l'auteur, & incogneues de noz anciens & modernes, Paris, Pierre l'Huilier. (Google Books: volume 1, volume 2)
- 1584 Les vrais pourtraits et vies des hommes illustres grecz, latins et payens (Gallica link)
- MS: Grand Insulaire,
- MS Histoire de deux voyages

== See also ==
- Antarctic France
- Old Tupi

== Sources ==
- Cantacuzene, J. M. Frère André Thevet (1516–1590). Miscellanea (PDF file).
