= London Chamber of Commerce and Industry =

Business organization in London, United Kingdom

The London Chamber of Commerce and Industry (LCCI) is a business organization based in London, founded in 1882. It provides support for its members’ businesses through services and advocates on behalf of London’s business community.

The Chamber has interest groups designed to provide targeted support, including the Asian Business Association (ABA), Black Business Association (BBA), and Business Owners Club.

== History ==
There have been various chambers of commerce in London over the years. John Weskett ran a London chamber from 1782 to 1800. A larger chamber ran in 1823 and 1824, with support from MP and Bank of England director William Haldimand. Several other short-lived attempts were made until the current chamber was founded in 1882.

The LCC was a supporter of calls for an Imperial Federation. In 1886, they funded a competition for the best essay "Formulating a Practical Working Plan of the Federation and the Mother Country." The prize was set at £50 and a size limit of 75 pages was set. 106 entries were received and judged by a panel consisting of James Anthony Froude, Rawson W. Rawson and John Robert Seeley. William Henry Parr Greswell, a former professor of classical studies at Cape University won. His essay, and those of four runners-up were published together.

In 1903, the LCCI established its first arbitration scheme for the resolution of commercial disputes, called the London Chamber of Arbitration. In 2020, this was reformed as the London Chamber of Arbitration and Mediation (LCAM).

In 2025, Michael Mainelli was appointed President of the London Chamber of Commerce and Industry.
