= Michael Gandy =

Michael Gandy may refer to:

- Michael Gandy (architect) (1778–1862), English architect
- Michael Gandy (cricketer) (born 1944), Australian cricketer
- Mike Gandy (born 1979), American football offensive tackle
