= John Peter Gandy =

British architect

John Peter Gandy RA (1787 – 2 March 1850 in Hanover Square, London), later John Peter Deering, was a British architect. He served as a member of parliament (MP) from 1847 to 1848.

== Family ==
Gandy was the youngest of the ten children of Thomas Gandy (d. 1814) and his wife, Sophia, née Adams. His older brothers included the painter Joseph Michael Gandy ARA (1771–1843) and the architect Michael Gandy (1778–1862). Their father Thomas worked at White's, the oldest gentlemen's club in London, in the neighbourhood known as St James's.

== Life ==
In 1805 John Peter Gandy was admitted to the Royal Academy Schools, where he was awarded their silver medal in 1806. He exhibited at the Royal Academy between 1805 and 1833. His early exhibits included "A Design for the Royal Academy" (1807) and two drawings, "An Ancient City" and "The Environs of an Ancient City" (1810).

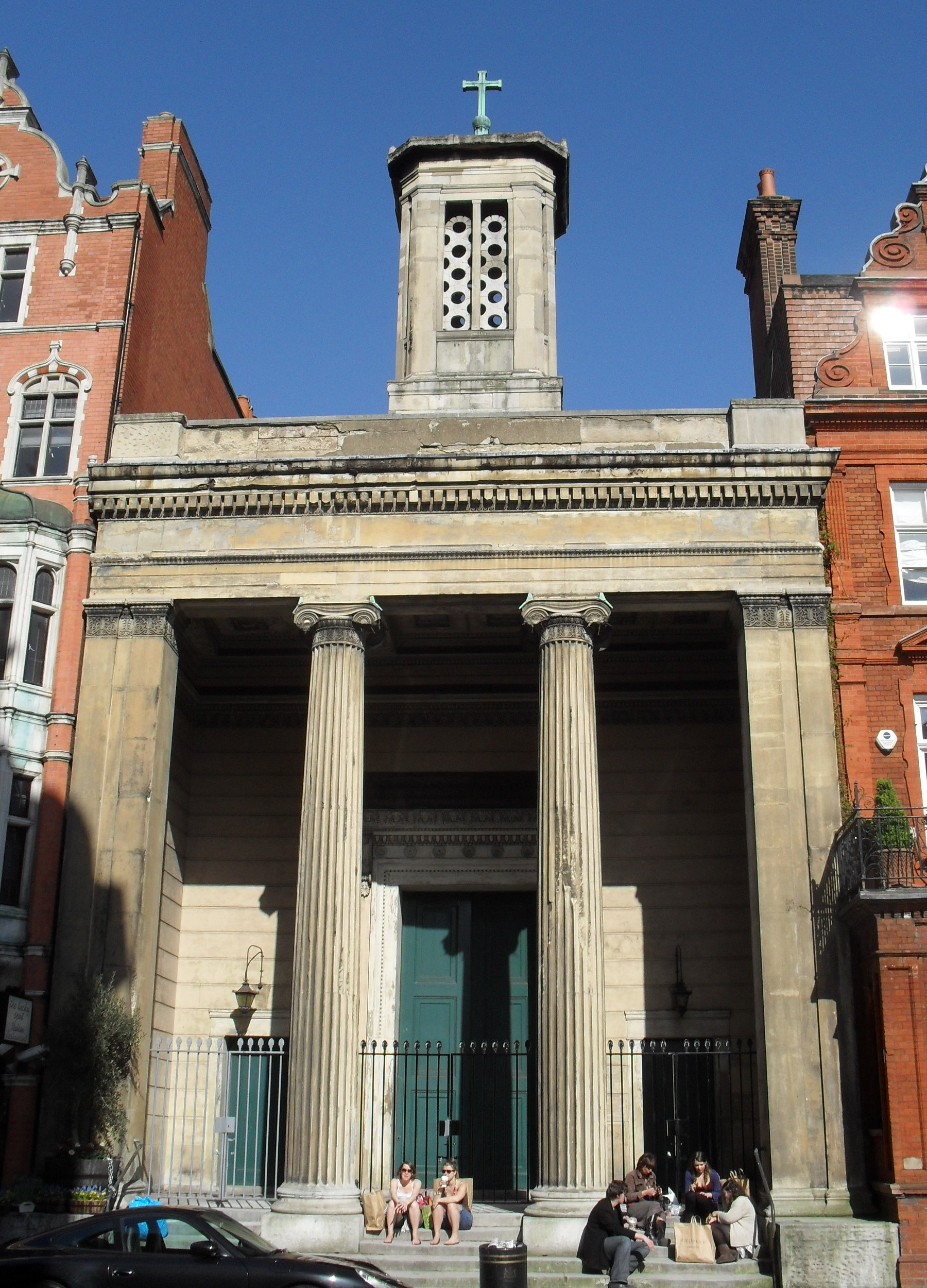
Former St Mark's Church, North Audley Street, London (IoE Code 421605)

He was a pupil of James Wyatt from 1805 to 1808 and, when he left Wyatt's office, he took a job at the Barrack Office. In 1810 his was the winning design for a new Bethlem Hospital, though it was never built. He was granted leave from the Barrack Office from 1811 to 1813 to accompany Sir William Gell as his architectural draughtsman on an expedition to Greece on behalf of the Society of Dilettanti. The write-up of the trip was published in 1817 as The Unedited Antiquities of Attica, and in 1840 as the third volume of Antiquities of Ionia, edited by William Wilkins. Gell and Gandy also published Pompeiana (1817–19), which came to be the standard work on the excavations at Pompeii.

Gandy was elected a member of the Society of Dilettanti in 1830 and then began establishing himself as an architect. To begin with he collaborated with William Wilkins on works including an abortive 1817 design for a 280-foot tower commemorating the battle of Waterloo, intended for Portland Place, which fell through due to an economic recession; the United University Club, Pall Mall from 1822 to 1826; and on University College London, for which his designs were runner-up to Wilkins's, which Gandy then assisted Wilkins to construct.

Gandy's other London buildings included the Greek Revival St Mark's Church, North Audley Street (1825–8), and Exeter Hall, in The Strand (1830–31). He remodelled the courtyard of Burghley House, Northamptonshire (1828) and made alterations at Shrubland Park, Suffolk (1831–3). Though he was regarded as an authority on Greek architecture and produced mostly neo-classical designs, there were exceptions, such as the Stamford and Rutland Hospital in Lincolnshire, in the Tudor Gothic style. He was elected ARA in 1826 and RA in 1838, with Wilkins' support.

In 1828 Gandy's friend Henry Deering bequeathed him The Lee estate, near Great Missenden, Buckinghamshire. Gandy took the name of Deering and, gradually giving up his profession as an architect, spent the rest of his life as a country gentleman. He was elected as a Conservative Member of Parliament (MP) for Aylesbury at the 1847 general election, but a petition led to his election being declared void in 1848. He was High Sheriff of Buckinghamshire in 1840.

== Sources ==
- Burnet, G. W. (1885–1900). "Deering, John Peter" . Dictionary of National Biography. London: Smith, Elder & Co.
- 'Gandy afterwards Deering, John Peter', H. M. Colvin, A Biographical Dictionary of British Architects, 1600–1840, 3rd edn (1995), 387–8
- A. Felstead, J. Franklin, and L. Pinfield, eds., Directory of British architects, 1834–1900 (1993); 2nd edn, ed. A. Brodie and others, 2 vols.(2001)
- R. Windsor Liscombe, William Wilkins, 1778–1839 (1980)
- Algernon Graves, A dictionary of artists who have exhibited works in the principal London exhibitions of oil paintings from 1760 to 1880 (1884); new edn. (1895); 3rd edn, 76, 107.
- The Builder, 8 (1850), 130
- S. C. Hutchison, 'The Royal Academy Schools, 1768–1830', Walpole Society, 38 (1960–62), 123–91
- 'Gandy-Deering (Peter John, also known as J. P. Gandy, Gandy Deering and J. P. Deering from 1828', The Dictionary of Architecture, ed. Wyatt Papworth (1853–92)
- Gentleman's Magazine, 2nd ser., 33 (1850), 448

Parliament of the United Kingdom
Preceded by Charles John Baillie-Hamilton; Richard Rice Clayton	Member of Parliament for Aylesbury; 1847 – 1848; With: The Lord Nugent	Succeeded by The Lord Nugent; Quintin Dick
Honorary titles
Preceded by Benjamin Way	High Sheriff of Buckinghamshire; 1840	Succeeded by Thomas Newland Allen
