= James Buller =

James Buller may refer to:

- James Buller (the elder) (1678–1710), British MP for Saltash, Cornwall 1701–1705 and 1708–1710
- James Buller (1717–1765) (1717–1765), British MP for East Looe 1741–1748 and Cornwall 1748–1765
- James Buller (1766–1827), British MP for Exeter and East Looe 1802
- James Buller (1772–1830), British MP for West Looe
- James Wentworth Buller (1798–1865), British Member of Parliament for Exeter, and for North Devon

== See also ==
- Sir James Buller East, 2nd Baronet (1789–1878), British MP for Winchester
