= Henry Frederick Cooke =

Major-General Sir Henry Frederick Cooke KCH CB
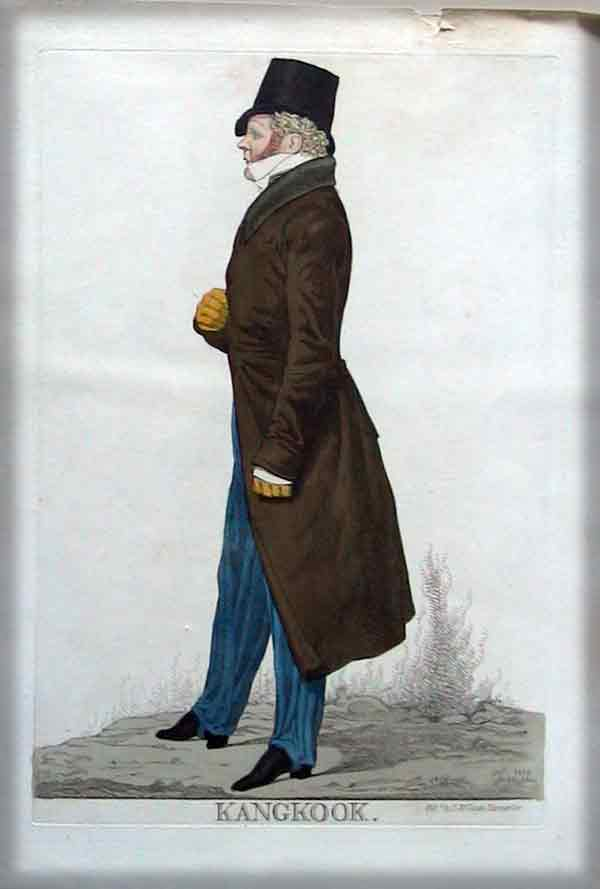
- Caricature by Richard Dighton, 1819
- Born: 1783
- Died: 10 March 1837 (aged 53–54)

Major-General Sir Henry Frederick Cooke KCH CB (bapt. 13 April 1783 – 10 March 1837), known as Kangkook, was a British Army officer and Tory politician.

He was the son of George John Cooke of Harefield, MP for Middlesex, and Penelope Bowyer, daughter of Sir William Bowyer, 3rd Baronet of Denham Court. His father, the son of George Cooke, descended from a line of prothonotaries of the Court of Common Pleas. He was the younger brother of Lieutenant-General Sir George Cooke, and of Edward Cooke R.N.; his sister Penelope Anne was married to Robert Brudenell, 6th Earl of Cardigan.

Cooke served as a Staff Officer during the Peninsular War between 1809 and 1812, being promoted from Captain to Lieut-Colonel in the Coldstream Guards. He acted as Assistant Adjutant General to Sir Charles Stewart. After being aide-de-camp to the Duke of York from 1814 until 1827, he became his private secretary.

Cooke represented Orford in Parliament between 1826 and 1832 and was described as the ugliest man in the British army. His residence was at 50 Charles Street, Berkeley Square and he was married to Katherine Windham, daughter of Admiral Windham of Felbrigg.

Parliament of the United Kingdom
Preceded by Charles Ross; Edmond Alexander MacNaghten	Member of Parliament for Orford; 1826–1832; With: Horace Seymour to December 1826; Quintin Dick December 1826–1830; Spencer Horsey Kilderbee 1830–1832	Constituency abolished
