= George Nugent-Grenville, 2nd Baron Nugent =

British politician

George Nugent-Grenville, 2nd Baron Nugent of Carlanstown, GCMG (31 December 1788 – 26 November 1850), was an Irish politician.

== Life ==
A younger son of George Nugent-Temple, 1st Marquess of Buckingham, by Lady Mary Elizabeth Nugent, only daughter and heiress of Robert Nugent, 1st Earl Nugent, he was born on 31 December 1788. His mother was created a baroness of the kingdom of Ireland in 1800, with remainder to her second son; and on her death (16 March 1813) he consequently succeeded to the peerage. Nugent was educated at Brasenose College, Oxford, and in 1810 received the honorary degree of D.C.L. from the university.

He was Whig Member of Parliament for Buckingham, 1810–1812. This was a rotten borough controlled by the Grenvilles. At the general election of 1812 Nugent was returned to Parliament for the borough of Aylesbury; but in 1818 he was in some danger of losing his seat in consequence of his brother Richard, the Marquess of Buckingham, having joined the ministry. Nugent stood in his own interest, however, and was returned. He fought another successful contest in 1831, and remained one of the members for Aylesbury until the dissolution in 1832.

In November 1830 Nugent was made one of the Lords of the Treasury, but he resigned this position in August 1832, to become Lord High Commissioner of the Ionian Islands. This office he retained for three years, returning to England with the Grand Cross of St. Michael and St. George. He again offered himself for Aylesbury in 1837 and 1839, but was defeated on both occasions; and in 1843, when he stood, with the reformer George Thompson, for Southampton, he sustained a third defeat. On reappearing at Aylesbury in 1847 he was returned.

Nugent was an extreme Whig, or a whig-radical, in politics. He was a strong supporter of Queen Caroline of Brunswick, and he visited Spain as a partisan of the Spanish Liberals against the Carlists. In the session of 1848 Nugent moved for leave to bring in a bill abolishing the separate imprisonment in gaols of persons committed for trial, but the motion was lost. During the same session he advocated the abolition of capital punishment. In 1849 he voted for limiting the powers of the Habeas Corpus (Ireland) Suspension Bill, and also supported a measure for the further repeal of Penal Laws. He was a member of the Reform Club and the Athenaeum Club.

Nugent died on 26 November 1850, at his residence in Buckinghamshire.

== Works ==
In 1812 Nugent published Portugal, a Poem then in 1829 Oxford and Locke, which defended the expulsion of Locke from the University of Oxford against the censures of Dugald Stewart. Nugent's sympathetic Memorials of John Hampden appeared in 1832. The work was favourably reviewed by Thomas Babington Macaulay in the Edinburgh Review, and adversely by Robert Southey in the Quarterly Review, resulting in a flurry of correspondence.

Legends of the Library at Lillies (his family seat) appeared in 1832: "from the fireside of the... little oak library the following legends proceed." It was followed by the two-volume travelogue Lands Classical and Sacred in 1845–6. Nugent also wrote pamphlets on political, social, and ecclesiastical subjects.

== Family ==
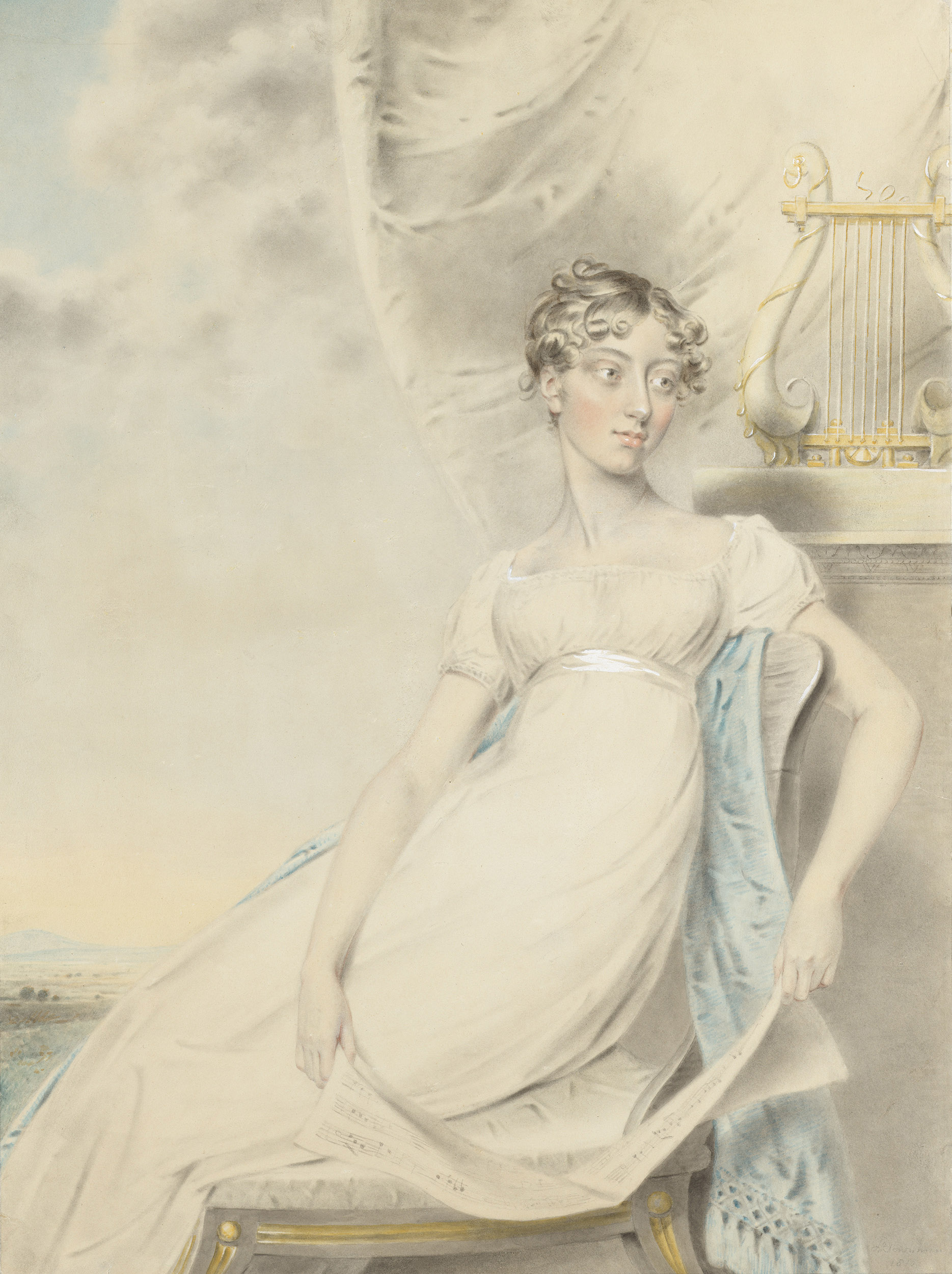
Portrait of Lady Nugent by John Dowman

Nugent married, 6 September 1813, Anne Lucy, second daughter of Major-General the Hon. Vere Poulett. She died without issue in 1848, and the barony became extinct on the death of Nugent.

Parliament of the United Kingdom
| Preceded by Thomas Grenville; Richard Neville | Member of Parliament for Buckingham; 1810–1812; With: Richard Neville | Succeeded by Viscount Ebrington; William Fremantle |
| Preceded by Sir George Nugent, Bt; Thomas Hussey | Member of Parliament for Aylesbury; 1812–1832; With: Thomas Hussey 1812–1814; Charles Cavendish 1814–1818; William Rickford 1818–1832 | Succeeded by William Rickford; Henry Hanmer |
| Preceded by Charles Baillie-Hamilton; Richard Rice Clayton | Member of Parliament for Aylesbury; 1847–1850; With: John Peter Deering 1847–1848; Quintin Dick 1848–1850 | Succeeded by Quintin Dick; Frederick Calvert |
Peerage of Ireland
| Preceded by Mary Elizabeth Nugent | Baron Nugent; 1812–1850 | Extinct |
