= John Round (MP) =

British politician (1783–1860)

John Round (8 March 1783 – 28 April 1860) was an English banker and Conservative Party politician.

He was the eldest surviving son of barrister John Round, of Colchester and was educated at Gray's Inn (1800) and Balliol College, Oxford (1801–05).

He was member of parliament (MP) for Ipswich from 1812 to 1818, and for Maldon from 1837 to 1847. He was High Steward of Colchester from 1818 to his death and appointed High Sheriff of Essex for 1834–35.

He married Susan Constantia, the daughter of George Caswall of Sacombe Park, Hertfordshire, with whom he had 3 sons and 2 daughters. His grandson John Horace Round was a historian and genealogist of medieval England.

Parliament of the United Kingdom
Preceded by Home Riggs Popham and Robert Crickitt	Member of Parliament for Ipswich; 1812–1818; With: Robert Crickitt	Succeeded by William Newton and Robert Crickitt
Preceded by Quintin Dick and Thomas Barrett-Lennard	Member of Parliament for Maldon; 1837–1847; With: Quintin Dick	Succeeded by David Waddington and Thomas Barrett-Lennard
