= Charles Baillie-Hamilton (Aylesbury MP) =

British Conservative Party politician (1800–1865)

Charles John Baillie-Hamilton

MP for Aylesbury
- In office 1839–1847 Serving with William Rickford; Rice Richard Clayton
- Preceded by: William Rickford; Winthrop Mackworth Praed
- Succeeded by: John Peter Deering; George Nugent-Grenville

Personal details
- Born: 4 January 1800
- Died: 24 August 1865 (aged 65)
- Party: Conservative
- Spouse: Lady Caroline Bertie (m. 1821)
- Parents: Charles Baillie-Hamilton (father); Charlotte Home (mother)
- Relatives: Charles Hamilton (great-grandfather); Alexander Home (grandfather); William Baillie-Hamilton (brother); Ker Baillie-Hamilton (brother); Willoughby Bertie (father-in-law)

Charles John Baillie-Hamilton (4 January 1800 – 24 August 1865) was a British Conservative Party politician.

A member of the Baillie-Hamilton family headed by the Earl of Haddington, he was the son of the Venerable Charles Baillie-Hamilton, Archdeacon of Cleveland, son of the Honourable George Baillie, second son of Charles Hamilton, Lord Binning. His mother was Lady Charlotte, daughter of Alexander Home, 9th Earl of Home. Four of his brothers also gained distinction. Sir George Baillie was Ambassador to Tuscany; William Baillie-Hamilton and Cospatrick Baillie-Hamilton were both Admirals in the Royal Navy; and Ker Baillie-Hamilton was Governor of the Leeward Islands.

Baillie-Hamilton was elected as a Member of Parliament (MP) for Aylesbury at a by-election in July 1839, and held the seat until the 1847 general election, which he did not contest. He stood for Parliament again at a by-election in December 1857 for Buckinghamshire, but did not win the seat.

He married Lady Caroline, daughter of Willoughby Bertie, 4th Earl of Abingdon, in 1821. They had several children. He died in August 1865, aged 65. Lady Caroline died in March 1870.

Parliament of the United Kingdom
Preceded by William Rickford; Winthrop Mackworth Praed	Member of Parliament for Aylesbury; 1839–1847; With: William Rickford 1839–1841; Richard Rice Clayton 1841–1847	Succeeded by John Peter Deering; The Lord Nugent
