= William Rickford =

English banker and Whig politician

William Rickford (30 November 1768 – 14 January 1854) was an English banker and Whig politician who sat in the House of Commons from 1818 to 1841.

Rickford was the son of William Rickford who established the Aylesbury Old Bank in 1795. Rickford became the sole proprietor of the bank when his father died in 1803. He ran the bank until he died in 1854.

In 1818, Rickford was elected member of parliament (MP) for Aylesbury. He held the seat until 1841.

Rickford died at the age of 85.

Rickford married Mary Vanderhelm, daughter of John Vanderhelm, on 28 September 1791.

Parliament of the United Kingdom
Preceded by Charles Compton Cavendish; Lord Nugent	Member of Parliament for Aylesbury; 1818 – 1841; With: Lord Nugent to 1832; Henry Hanmer 1832–37; Winthrop Mackworth Praed 1837–39; Charles Baillie-Hamilton from 1839	Succeeded by Richard Rice Clayton; Charles Baillie-Hamilton
