= Henry Hanmer =

English Tory politician

Lieutenant-Colonel Henry Hanmer, KH DL (23 January 1789 – 2 February 1868) was an English Tory politician who sat in the House of Commons from 1831 to 1837.

Hanmer was the fifth son of Sir Thomas Hanmer, 2nd Baronet of Hanmer, Bettisfield Park in Flintshire, and his wife Margaret Kenyon daughter of George Kenyon of Peel Hall Leicestershire. He was educated at Rugby School and Peterhouse, Cambridge. He became a cornet in the Royal Horse Guards in 1808 and in 1813 was Aide-de-camp to Sir Rowland Hill at Pamplona and at the Battle of Vitoria. He reached the rank of Lieutenant-Colonel. He was a J.P. and deputy lieutenant for Bedfordshire, Buckinghamshire and Berkshire.

At the 1831 general election Hanmer was elected member of parliament (MP) for Westbury, but resigned the seat shortly afterwards. After the parliamentary reform, he was elected at the 1832 general election as MP for Aylesbury, and held the seat until he retired in 1837. In 1854 Hanmer became High Sheriff of Buckinghamshire.

Hanmer died at the age of 79. He had married Sarah Serra Ximenes, daughter of Sir Morris Ximenes of Bear Place, Berkshire. They lived at Stockgrove Park, Leighton Buzzard.

Parliament of the United Kingdom
Preceded by Michael George Prendergast; Sir Alexander Cray Grant, Bt	Member of Parliament for Westbury; May 1831 – July 1831; With: Sir Ralph Lopes, Bt	Succeeded by Henry Frederick Stephenson; Sir Ralph Lopes, Bt
Preceded by Lord Nugent; William Rickford	Member of Parliament for Aylesbury; 1832 – 1837; With: William Rickford	Succeeded by William Rickford; Winthrop Mackworth Praed
