= Joseph Gandy =

English painter

Joseph Gandy ARA
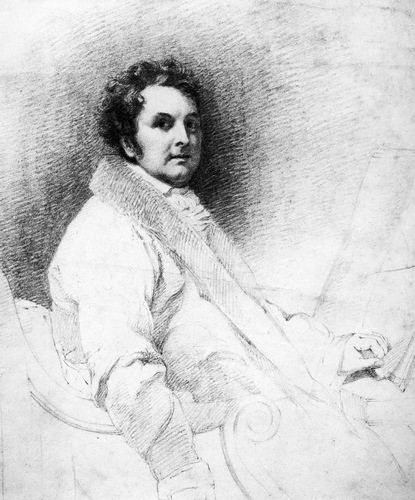
- Sketch of Joseph Gandy by Henry William Pickersgill, 1822.
- Born: 1771; London, England
- Died: 25 December 1843 (aged 71–72); Devon, England
- Known for: Painting
- Patrons: Sir John Soane

Joseph Michael Gandy ARA (1771 – 25 December 1843) was an English artist, visionary architect and architectural theorist, most noted for his imaginative paintings depicting John Soane's architectural designs. He worked extensively with Soane both as draughtsman and creative partner from 1798 until 1809 when he (ultimately unsuccessfully) set up his own practice.

== Family ==
Joseph Gandy was the son of Thomas Gandy (1744–1814) and Sophia née Adams (1743–1818). His father was employed at White's Club, London. Joseph was the brother of the architects Michael Gandy (1778–1862) and John Peter Gandy, later Deering (1787–1850).

In 1801, he married Eleanor Susannah Baptist née Webb (1773–1867), daughter of Thomas Webb and Catherine née Wiggington. Among their children, Mary Gandy (1810–1888) married Francis Impey (1812–?) attorney, son of Vice Admiral John Impey RN (1772–1858); and Thomas Gandy (1807–1877), portrait painter, married Catherine née Hyde (1811–1889); they were great grandparents of Robin Gandy.

== Early life ==
During the rebuilding of White's in 1787–1788, Gandy came to the notice of architect James Wyatt, who took him into his office. Gandy entered the Royal Academy School in 1790. In 1794, he travelled to Italy (with another young architect, Charles Tatham) at the expense of John Martindale, proprietor of White's, and remained there until the advance of Napoleon's army in 1797.

Returning to England, he found employment as a draughtsman in the office of Sir John Soane. He practised on his own from 1801 and in 1803 was elected ARA, perhaps through Soane's influence.

== Career ==
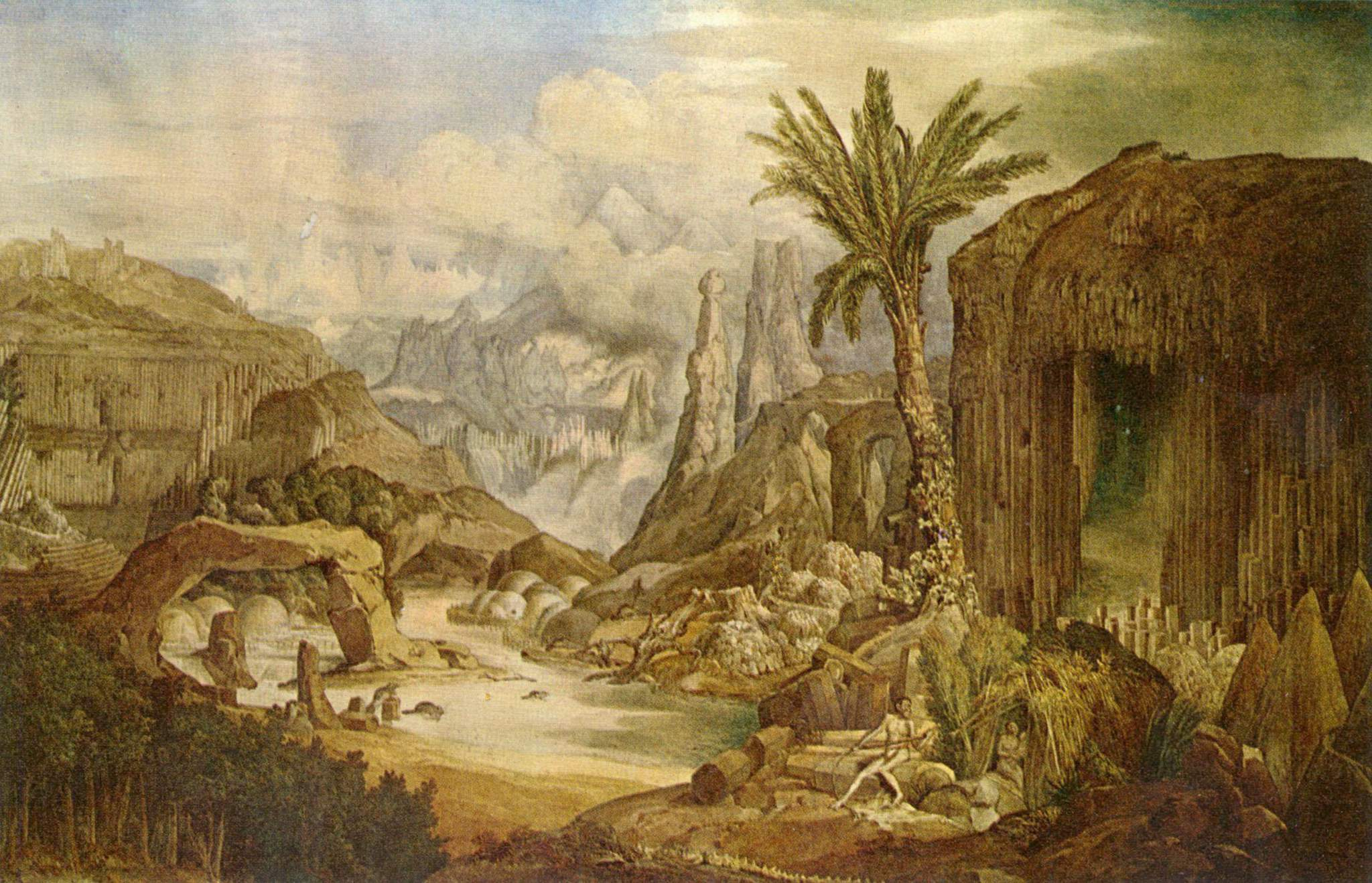
Joseph Gandy, The Origins of Architecture, Soane Museum, London

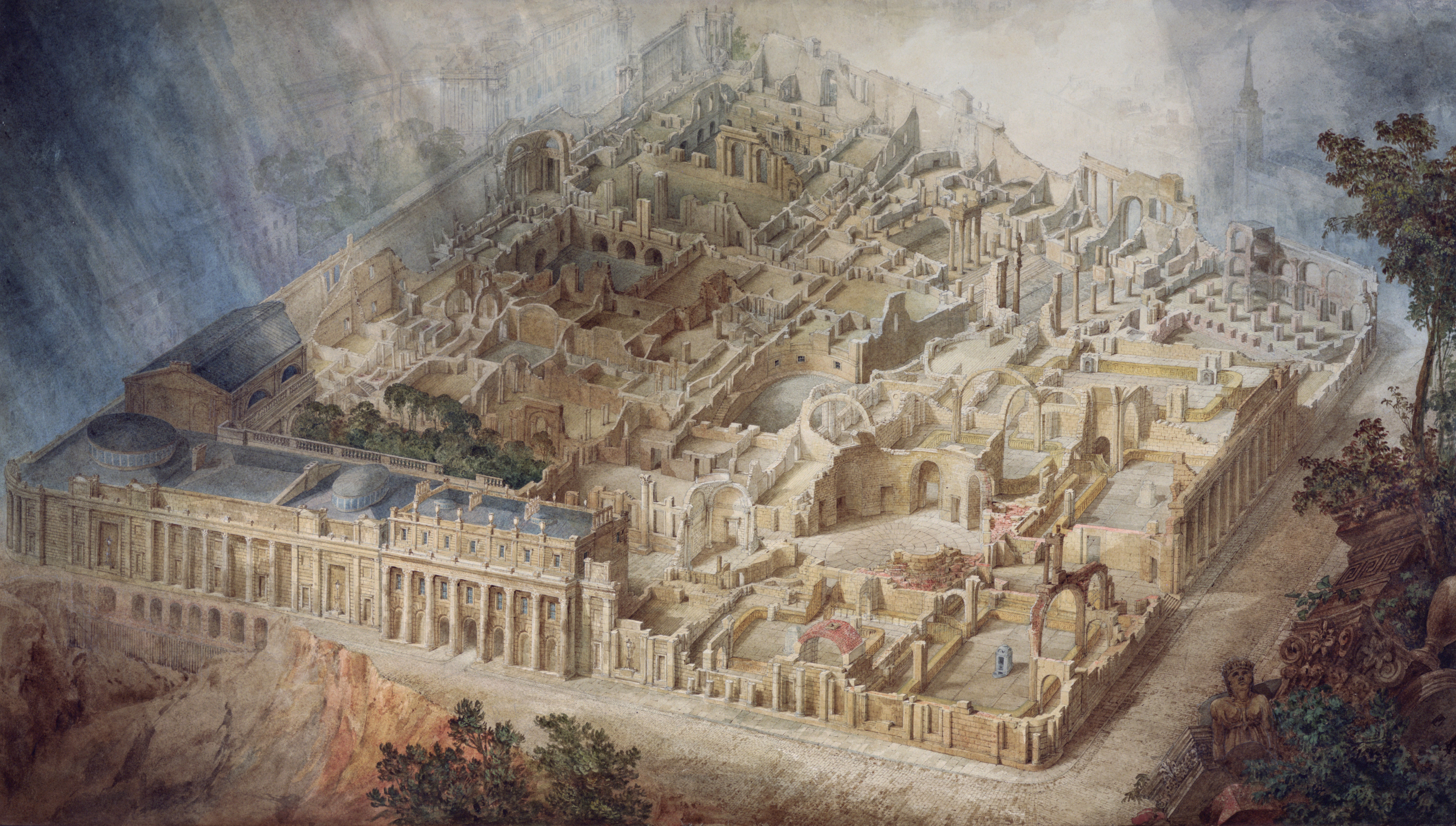
Gandy, cut-away perspective drawing of Soane-designed Bank of England as a ruin, 1830, Soane Museum

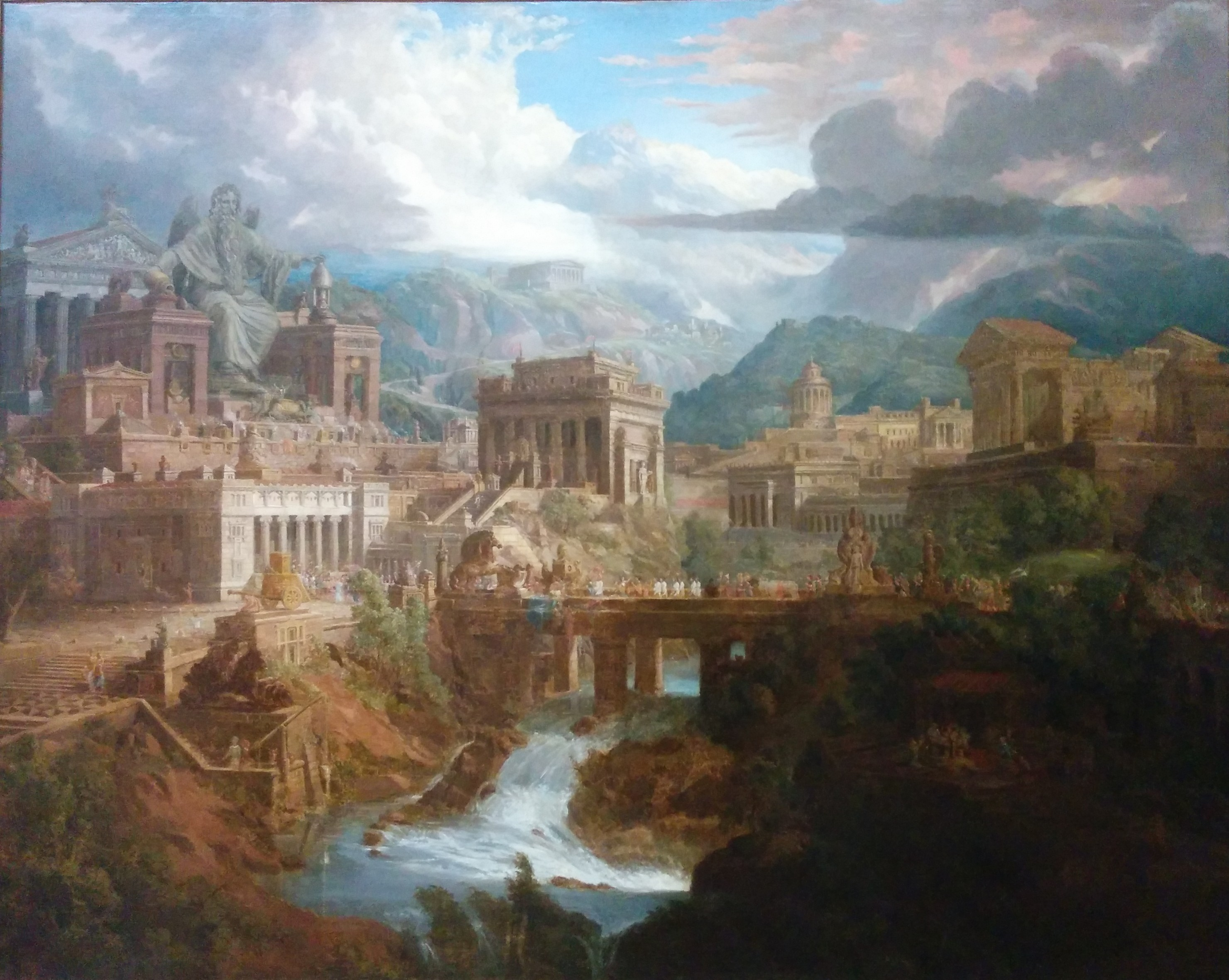
Gandy, ancient Greek city of Lebadeia (modern Livadeia), 1819, Tate Britain

Gandy built little in his career, having a reputation as a difficult individual to deal with. His work included the Phoenix Fire and Pelican Life Insurance Offices (1804–1805, destroyed c. 1920) in London; the gallery at Doric House at Sion Hill in Bath for Charles Spackman (1818); and the remodelling of Swerford Park house in Oxfordshire for General Bolton (1824–1829). In the intervals between these works he was employed by Soane to make watercolour perspectives of his architectural designs.

Commercially he was a failure and served two terms in a debtors' prison, but his published and exhibited work was largely a critical and popular success. In 1821 he published two articles in the Magazine of Fine Arts on The Philosophy of Architecture. He intended to expand upon this subject in an eight-volume work entitled Art, Philosophy and Science of Architecture, of which his unpublished manuscript survives.

His paintings show a dramatic use of two-point perspective and architectural precision, and also reflect his (and Soane's) fascination with Roman ruins. His architectural fantasies owe a clear debt to Piranesi and play upon historical, literary and mythological themes, with a feeling for the sublime that is the equal of his contemporaries J. M. W. Turner and John Martin.

== Death and legacy ==
Gandy died in a private asylum in Plympton, then on the outskirts of Plymouth, where he had been placed by his family in 1839. Many of his paintings can be seen in the Picture Room of Sir John Soane's Museum in London.

== Bibliography ==
- Joseph Gandy, Designs for Cottages, Cottage Farms, and Other Rural Buildings: Including Entrance Gates and Lodges. London: John Harding, 1805.
- Joseph Gandy, The rural architect: consisting of various designs for country buildings, accompanied with ground plans, estimates and descriptions. London; John Harding, 1805
- 'Joseph Gandy in the shadow of the Enlightenment: The annual Soane Lecture', Brian Lukacher, 2002. ISBN 978-0-954228415.
- 'Joseph Gandy: An Architectural Visionary in Georgian England', Brian Lukacher, 2006. ISBN 978-0-500342213.
