= St Mark's, Mayfair =

Church in Mayfair, London

Coordinates: 51°30′47″N 0°09′12″W

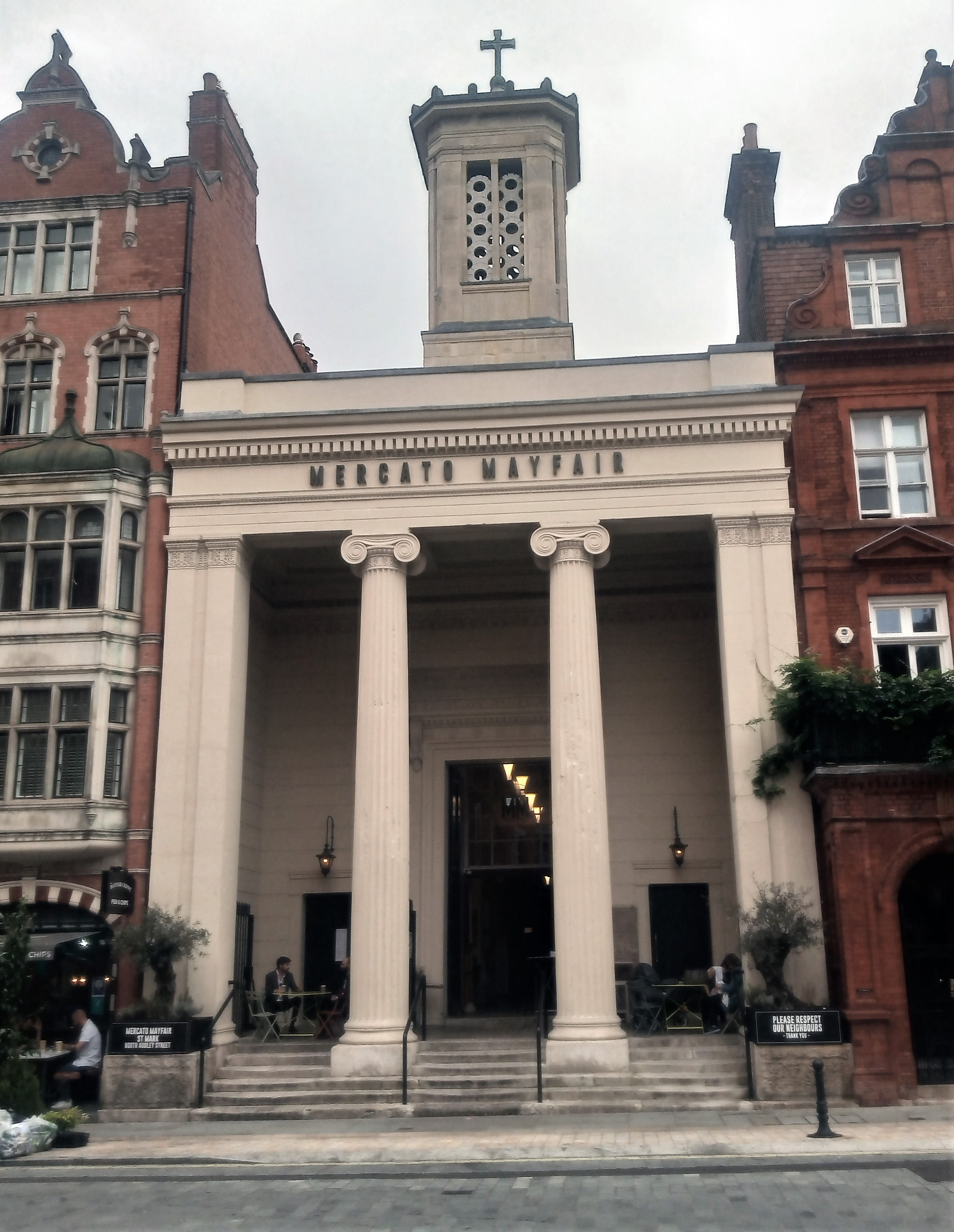
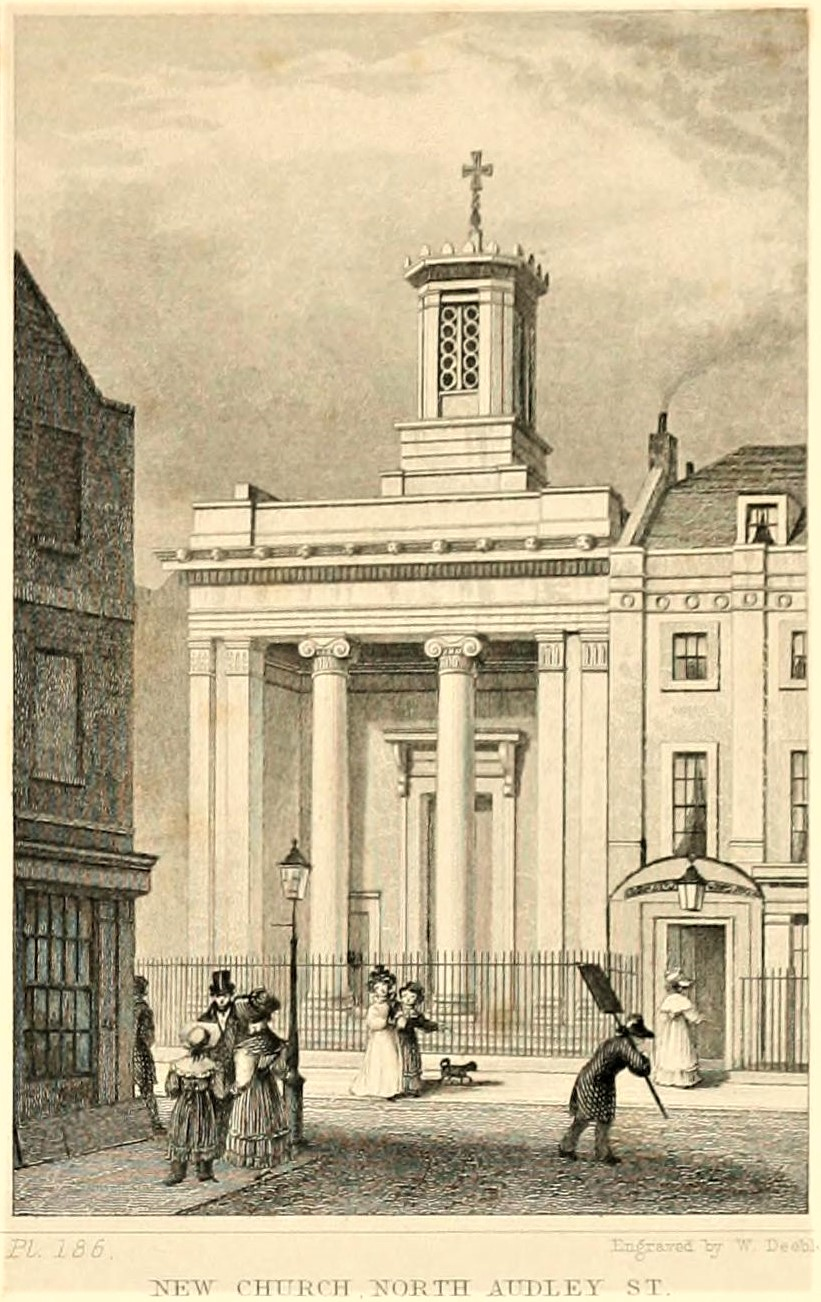
The exterior of the church in 2020 (left); St. Mark's, as it appeared in the 1830s (right)

St Mark's, Mayfair, is a Grade-I listed building, a former Anglican place of worship in North Audley Street, in the Mayfair district of London.

St Mark's was last used as a place of Christian worship by an independent congregation Commonwealth Christian Fellowship (CCF) from April 1994 to June 2014.

It has been the site of Mercato Mayfair, a food hall, since 2019.

== History ==
St Mark's was built in 1825–28 as a response to the shortage of churches in the area. The population in Mayfair had grown with the demand for town houses by the aristocracy and the wealthy, as they moved in from the country.

The building was constructed in the Greek revival style to the designs of John Peter Gandy. Gandy produced most of his work in Neo-classical designs, with St Mark's being one of the finest examples.

In 1878 architect Arthur Blomfield made substantial changes to the church interior, introducing a Romanesque open roof structure, wall decoration and architectural detail. The 34 feet (10 m) façade, together with the elegant porch, is known as one of the finest in London.

The church was listed Grade I in 1958. It was deconsecrated in 1974 and remained empty for many years, being included on English Heritage’s "Buildings at Risk" register for over 20 years.

In July 2014 the building was acquired by Grosvenor Estates.

== History as a place of worship ==
Edward Thomas Daniell, known for his watercolour paintings of the Near East and his etchings of Norfolk, was appointed to the curacy of the church in 1834.

During the Second World War, St Mark's became informally known as The American Church in London due to its proximity to the United States embassy and as a centre for American worshippers. It was visited by President Dwight Eisenhower and the political figure, diplomat and activist Eleanor Roosevelt when she was First Lady of the United States.

External videos
- St. Mark’s Church
- Earl of Harewood's Wedding – 1949 – British Movietone on YouTube（AP News Archive）

On the 29 September 1949, St. Mark's was the venue for the wedding of George Lascelles, 7th Earl of Harewood and pianist Marion Stein, which was attended by King George VI and other members of the royal family. A wedding anthem specially composed and conducted by Benjamin Britten was performed at the service.

The congregation dwindled during the 1950s and 1960s, until the church was declared redundant in 1974. It remained empty from 1975 to 1994. That year the Diocese of London allowed the use of the church by The Commonwealth Christian Fellowship led by Rod and Julie Anderson, who met there with a congregation of around 120 and provided an out-reach programme for anti-knife crime training for teenagers, home visits for elderly people and help for the homeless. The church was used in this way until 2008.

Between February and May 2015 the church hosted This Present House.

== Music ==
St Mark's has musical associations with Victorian opera, with the opera oratorio singer Sir Charles Santley and also with the composer Sir Arthur Sullivan. J. W. Elliott, a former organist at the church, composed the tune "Day of Rest" for the hymn "O Jesus I Have Promised".

Both John Williams, the first Master of Music at the Tower of London, and Margaret Cobb, the first woman to play the organ at the BBC Proms at Royal Albert Hall, were organists at the church.

The church has a three-manual organ by J. W. Walker & Sons Ltd which has recently been re-commissioned. There are plans to re-develop the instrument, with the assistance of organ builders Bishop and Son. The original Rushworth and Dreaper organ was relocated to Holy Trinity Brompton. St Mark's has held concerts by the London Russian Music School and it has also been the venue for concerts by such musicians as violinist Nicola Benedetti, and other choirs and ensembles from the locality.

== Other uses ==
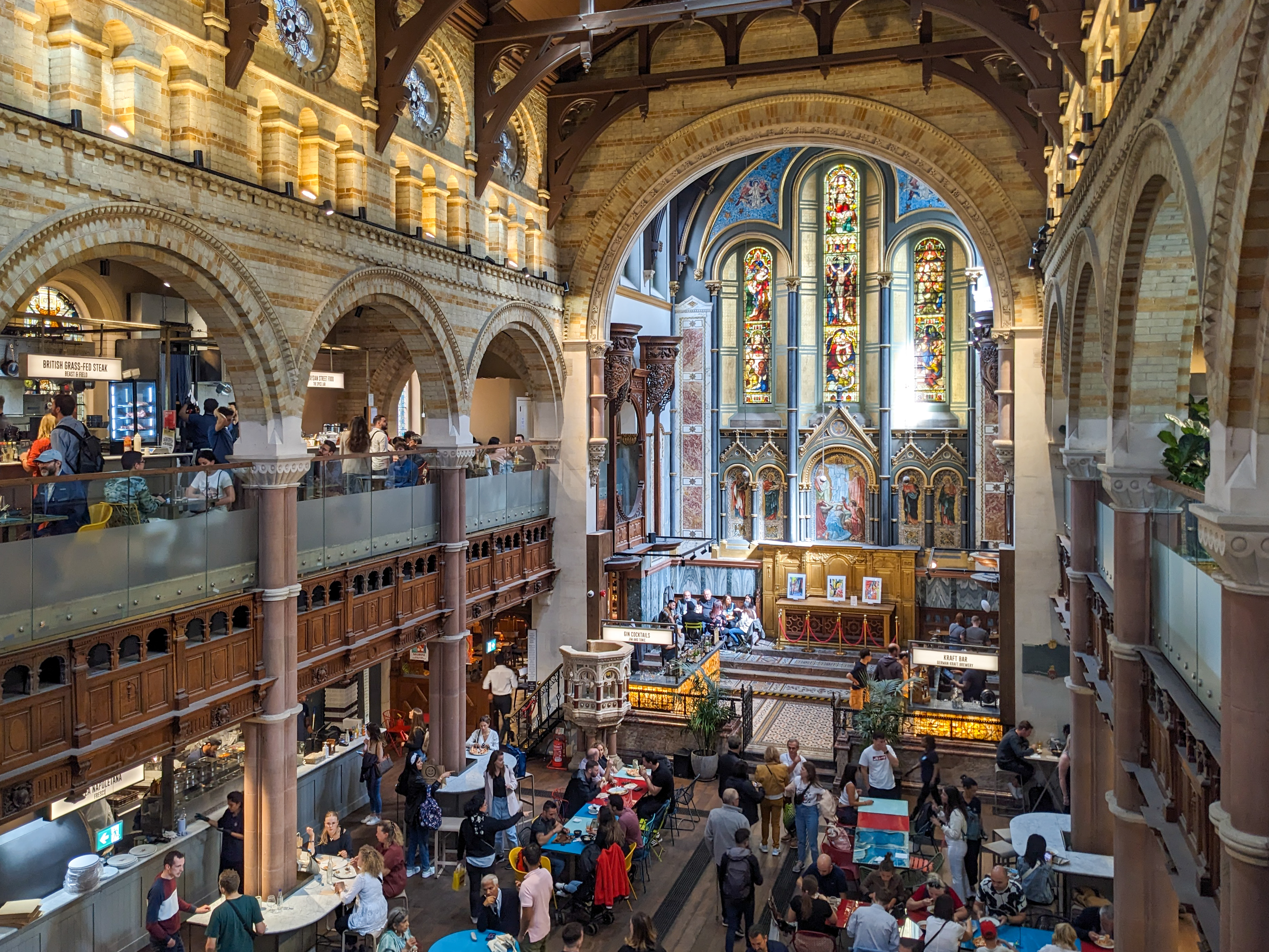
Interior in August 2023 as the Mercato Mayfair food hall

Hammer Holdings Limited successfully applied for planning permission to convert the building into a 'wellness centre' in 2006, but a campaign led by Lady Sainsbury succeeded in blocking the proposal.

It was subsequently acquired by One Events to use as a mixed-use venue known as One Mayfair, which opened in 2009. The building has been used for other events, such as by Nike, The London Summer Show, London Fashion Week and by Grosvenor Estates. In July 2014 the building was acquired by Grosvenor Estates. Since November 2019 St Mark's, has been Mercato Mayfair, a food hall operated by Mercato Metropolitano.
