= Winthrop Mackworth Praed =

English politician and poet

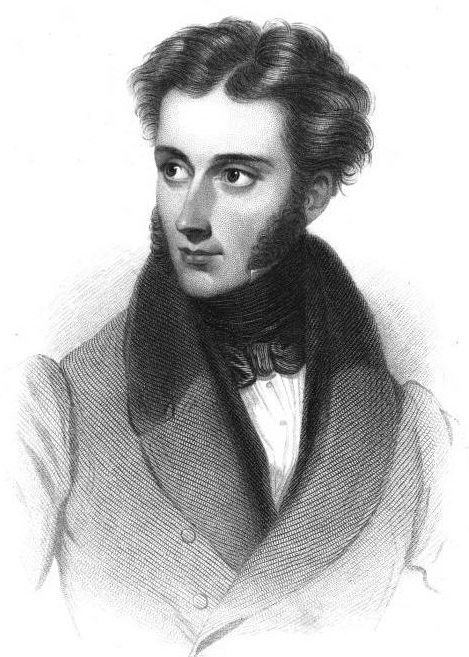
Winthrop Mackworth Praed

Winthrop Mackworth Praed (28 July 1802 – 15 July 1839)—typically written as W. Mackworth Praed—was an English politician and poet.

== Life ==
=== Early life ===
Praed was born in London, United Kingdom. The family name of Praed was derived from the marriage of the poet's great-grandfather to a Cornish heiress. Winthrop's father, William Mackworth Praed, was a serjeant-at-law (1756–1835) and a revising barrister for Bath. His mother belonged to the English branch of the New England family of Winthrop.

In 1814 Praed was sent to Eton College, where he founded a manuscript periodical called Apis matina. This was succeeded in October 1820 by the Etonian, a paper projected and edited by Praed and Walter Blount, which appeared every month until July 1821, when the chief editor, who signed his contributions "Peregrine Courtenay," left Eton, and the paper died. Henry Nelson Coleridge, William Sidney Walker, and John Moultrie were the three best known of his collaborators on this periodical, which was published by Charles Knight, and of which details are given in Knight's Autobiography and in Henry Maxwell Lyte's Eton College.

Before Praed left school he had established, over a shop at Eton, a "boys' library," the books of which were later amalgamated in the School Library. His career at Trinity College, Cambridge was a brilliant one. He gained the Browne medal for Greek verse four times and the Chancellor's Gold Medal for English verse twice in 1823 and 1824. He was bracketed third in the classical tripos in 1825, won a fellowship at his college in 1827, and three years later carried off the Seatonian prize. At the Union his speeches were rivalled only by those of Macaulay and of Charles Austin, who subsequently made a great reputation at the parliamentary bar. The character of Praed during his university life is described by Bulwer-Lytton in the first volume of his Life.

=== Political career ===
Praed began to study law, and in 1829 was called to the bar at the Middle Temple. On the Norfolk circuit, his prospects of advancement were bright, but his inclination was towards politics, and after a year or two he took up political life. Whilst at Cambridge he tended to Whiggism, and up to the end of 1829 he continued to have these sympathies, but during the agitation for parliamentary reform his opinions changed, and when he was returned to parliament for St Germans (17 December 1830), his election was due to the Tory party. He sat for that borough until December 1832, and on its extinction contested the borough of St Ives, within the limits of which the Cornish estates of the Praeds were situated.

The pieces he wrote on this occasion were collected in a volume printed at Penzance in 1833 and entitled Trash, dedicated without respect to James Halse, M.P., his successful opponent. Praed sat for Great Yarmouth from 1835 to 1837, and was Secretary to the Board of Control during Sir Robert Peel's short administration. He sat for Aylesbury from 1837 until his death. During the progress of the Reform Act 1832 he advocated the creation of three-cornered constituencies, in which each voter should have the power of giving two votes only, and maintained that freeholds within boroughs should confer votes for the boroughs and not for the county. Neither of these suggestions was then adopted, but the former ultimately formed part of the Reform Act 1867.

=== Personal life ===
In 1835, he married Helen Bogle. He died of tuberculosis at Chester Square, London, at age 36.

== Works ==
W. Mackworth Praed was famed for his verse charades. H. Austin Dobson praised Praed's "sparkling wit, the clearness and finish of his style, and the flexibility and unflagging vivacity of his rhythm" (Humphry Ward's English Poets). His verse abounded in allusions to the characters and follies of the day. His humour was much imitated.

His poems were first edited by Rufus Wilmot Griswold (New York, 1844); another American edition, by W. A. Whitmore, appeared in 1859; an authorized edition with a memoir by Derwent Coleridge appeared in 1864: The Political and Occasional Poems of W. M. Praed (1888), edited with notes by his nephew, Sir George Young, included many pieces collected from various newspapers and periodicals. Sir George Young separated from his work some poems, the work of his friend Edward FitzGerald, generally confused with his. Praed's essays, contributed to various magazines, were published in Morley's Universal Library in 1887.

== Legacy ==
Praed was not only successful at Eton during his lifetime, but a society still exists that bears his name. The "Praed" society is the poetry society currently existing at Eton. It meets at a master's house and membership is by invitation.

Parliament of the United Kingdom
Preceded by Charles Ross; Sir Henry Hardinge	Member of Parliament for St Germans; 1830–1832; With: Charles Ross	Constituency abolished
Preceded by Charles Edmund Rumbold; Hon. George Anson	Member of Parliament for Great Yarmouth; 1835–1837; With: Thomas Baring	Succeeded by Charles Edmund Rumbold; William Wilshere
Preceded by Henry Hanmer; William Rickford	Member of Parliament for Aylesbury; 1837–1839; With: William Rickford	Succeeded by Charles John Baillie-Hamilton; William Rickford
