= Charles Edmund Nugent =

Royal Navy Admiral of the Fleet (c. 1759–1844)

Sir Charles Edmund Nugent GCH
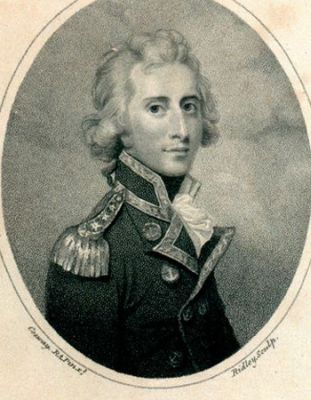
- Portrait of Nugent
- Born: c. 1759
- Died: 7 January 1844 (aged 84–85); Studland, Dorset
- Relatives: Robert Nugent, 1st Earl Nugent (grandfather); Field Marshal Sir George Nugent (brother)
- Military career
- Allegiance: Great Britain; United Kingdom
- Branch: Royal Navy
- Service years: 1771–1844
- Rank: Admiral of the Fleet
- Commands: HMS Pomona; HMS Veteran; HMS Caesar
- Conflicts: American Revolutionary War; Battle of Sullivan's Island; Battle of San Fernando de Omoa; French Revolutionary Wars; Invasion of Martinique; Invasion of Saint Lucia; Invasion of Guadaloupe; Napoleonic Wars
- Awards: Knight Grand Cross of the Hanoverian Order

Admiral of the Fleet Sir Charles Edmund Nugent GCH (c. 1759 – 7 January 1844) was a Royal Navy officer. He saw action as a junior officer in the 50-gun Bristol at the Battle of Sullivan's Island during the American Revolutionary War. He was held as a prisoner-of war for a day by Spaniards shortly before the Battle of San Fernando de Omoa later on in the War.

Nugent served in the naval brigade in the invasions of Martinique, Saint Lucia, and Guadaloupe during the French Revolutionary Wars and, when William Cornwallis assumed command of the blockade of Brest, Nugent was selected to serve as his Captain of the Fleet during the Napoleonic Wars. He never commanded any fleet or naval station but did rise to the highest rank in the Navy.

== Early career ==
He was the son of Lieutenant Colonel the Honourable Edmund Nugent, the only son of Robert Nugent, 1st Earl Nugent, but after his father's death in 1771 his marriage was found to have been illegal, and he and his elder brother George were declared illegitimate, and thus unable to inherit any of his grandfather's titles.

Nugent entered the Navy as a youngster in 1771, serving aboard the sloop Scorpion, commanded by George Elphinstone (later Viscount Keith) until 1774. He then served aboard Trident, flagship of Sir Peter Denis, in the Mediterranean.

The Battle of Sullivan's Island, which Nugent fought in

Towards the end of 1777 he was appointed to the 50-gun Bristol, flagship of Commodore Sir Peter Parker. On 26 December 1777 Parker sailed from Portsmouth with a squadron of ships, carrying troops under the command of Earl Cornwallis, to launch an attack on Charleston, South Carolina. The squadron arrived off Cape Fear in May, and was joined by General Henry Clinton and his troops. The combined force advanced upriver until reaching the strongly fortified Sullivan's Island. In the subsequent battle on 28 June the British were unable to subdue the defenders or mount an attack by land. Bristol bore the brunt of the American fire and had 111 men killed and wounded. The British eventually withdrew, and sailed north to attack New York. Nugent was serving as an acting-lieutenant during the attack on Sullivan's Island, and in September 1777 he followed Parker into the Chatham. In December Parker and Clinton were sent north to capture Rhode Island, which was taken without resistance. At the beginning of 1778 Parker sailed to Jamaica to serve as commander-in-chief, and on 26 May promoted Nugent to the rank of commander, his promotion to lieutenant as yet still unconfirmed by the Admiralty, and thus his name first appears in the Navy List as a commander.

On 2 May 1779 Nugent was promoted to post-captain in command of the 28-gun frigate Pomona at Jamaica. Before the Battle of San Fernando de Omoa in October 1779 Nugent was sent in the schooner Racehorse to employ local pilots from the Gulf of Honduras, but when attempting to land at St. George's Key was captured by armed Spanish boats. He was held as a prisoner until the next day, when Pomona arrived, the Spaniards fled, and Nugent and his boat crew released themselves. Nugent remained on the Jamaica station until mid-1782, when he returned to England with Sir Peter Parker. The following year he was elected as Member of Parliament for Buckingham.

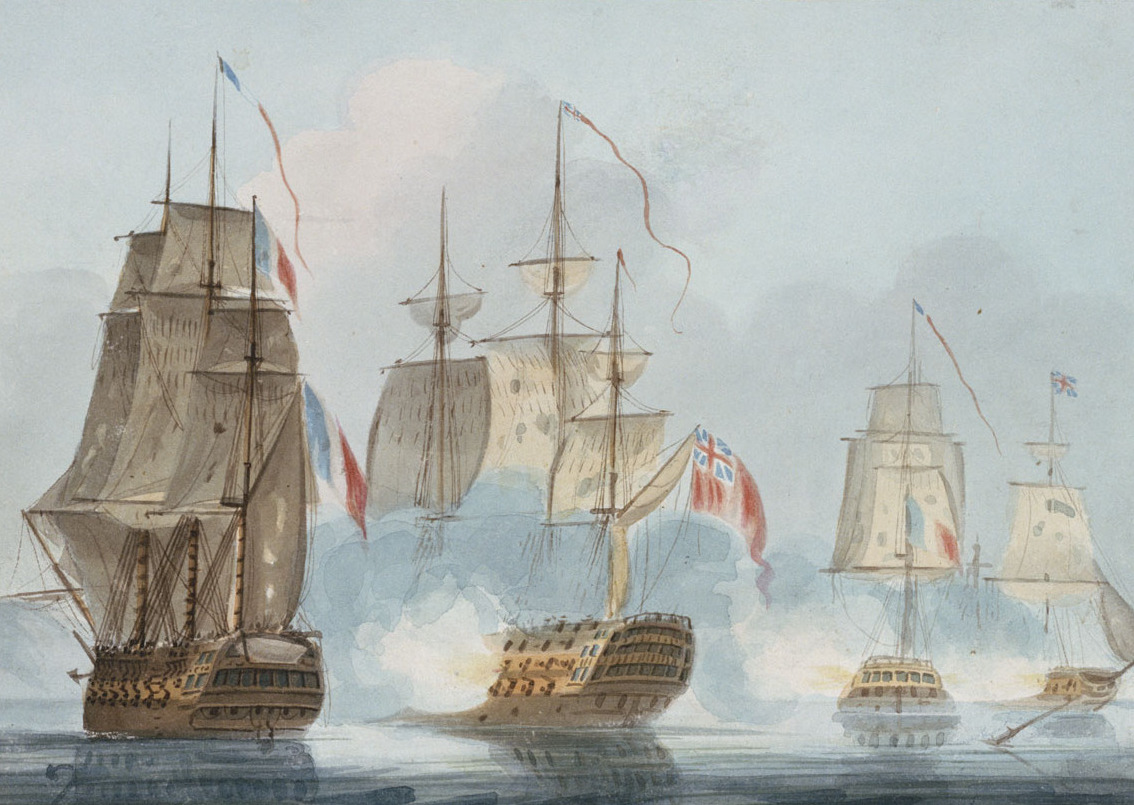
The 80-gun ship Caesar, a ship which Nugent commanded

When the war with France began in 1793 Nugent was appointed to the 64-gun ship Veteran, and sailed for the Caribbean at the end of the year. He served in the naval brigade in the invasions of Martinique, Saint Lucia, and Guadaloupe, receiving the thanks of the military Commander-in-Chief, Sir Charles Grey, before returning to England with despatches. Nugent then commanded the 80-gun ship Caesar in the Channel from early 1795 until early 1797.

== Senior command ==
Nugent was promoted to rear-admiral on 20 February 1797 and to vice-admiral on 1 January 1801. In mid-1805, when William Cornwallis assumed command of the blockade of Brest, Nugent was selected to serve as his Captain of the Fleet. Nugent was present at the funeral of Lord Nelson in January 1806. He saw no further service at sea, but was promoted to full admiral on 28 April 1808, and to Admiral of the Fleet on 24 April 1833, becoming the most senior officer of the Royal Navy, at the same time that his brother, Field Marshal Sir George Nugent, held the same position in the British Army.

On 12 March 1834 Nugent was made a Knight Grand Cross of the Hanoverian Order. He died on 7 January 1844, aged 85, at his son-in-law's home in Studland, Dorset.

== Family ==
Nugent was married, and his only daughter Georgina Charlotte married George Bankes, MP for Corfe Castle on 8 June 1822.

== Sources ==
- Heathcote, Tony (2002). The British Admirals of the Fleet 1734 – 1995. Pen & Sword. ISBN 0-85052-835-6.
- This article incorporates text from a publication now in the public domain: "Nugent, Charles Edmund". Dictionary of National Biography. London: Smith, Elder & Co. 1885–1900.

Parliament of Great Britain
Preceded by James Grenville; William Grenville	Member of Parliament for Buckingham; 1784–1790; With: James Grenville	Succeeded by James Grenville; George Nugent
