= Borough Triangle =

Approved skyscraper development in London

General information
- Type: Mixed use
- Location: Elephant and Castle, London, England
- Coordinates: 51.498845°N 0.098170°W

Height
- Roof: 158 m (518 ft)

Technical details
- Floor count: 46

Design and construction
- Architecture firm: Maccreanor Lavington

Borough Triangle is a planned mixed-use skyscraper development in Elephant and Castle in South London. The plans consist of four towers with two of 46 and 42 storeys rising to 158 m (518 ft) and 149 m (489 ft) respectively.

== Background ==
The development occupies a triangle bounded by Newington Causeway, Borough Road and the railway viaduct leading into Blackfriars station. It is occupied by Mercato Metropolitano, with its construction opposed by those who wished to keep the popular dining space open.

Current plans, designed by Maccreanor Lavington, were submitted in 2022 by developer Berkeley Homes and planning permission was eventually granted in 2025. In late 2025, Mercato Metropolitano announced it would continue to run through 2026. In September 2026, amended plans which brought the affordable housing from 35% to 10%, with the Southwark Council advised to reject the plans.
