= Quintin Dick =

Irish politician and barrister

Member of Parliament for Aylesbury
- In office 29 March 1848 – 7 July 1852 Serving with Richard Bethell (1851–1852); Frederick Calvert (1850–1851); George Nugent-Grenville (1848–1850)
- Preceded by: John Peter Deering; George Nugent-Grenville
- Succeeded by: Richard Bethell; Austen Henry Layard
Further information
Member of Parliament for Maldon
In office 30 July 1830 – 31 July 1847 Serving with John Round (1837–1847); Thomas Barrett-Lennard (1830–1837)
Preceded by	Hugh Dick; Thomas Barrett-Lennard
Succeeded by	Thomas Barrett-Lennard; David Waddington
Member of Parliament for Orford
In office 26 December 1826 – 3 August 1830 Serving with Henry Frederick Cooke
Preceded by	Henry Frederick Cooke; Horace Seymour
Succeeded by	Henry Frederick Cooke; Spencer Kilderbee
Member of Parliament for Cashel
In office 25 May 1807 – 15 April 1809
Preceded by	Archibald Primrose
Succeeded by	Robert Peel
Member of Parliament for West Looe
In office 21 December 1803 – 1 November 1806 Serving with Ralph Daniell (1805–1806); James Buller (1803–1805)
Preceded by	James Buller; Thomas Smith
Succeeded by	Ralph Daniell; James Buller
Member of the Dublin Parliament for Dunleer
In office January 1800 – August 1800 Serving with Thomas Foster
Preceded by	Thomas Foster; Henry Coddington
Succeeded by	Disenfranchised

Personal details
- Born: 7 February 1777 Dublin, Ireland
- Died: 26 March 1858 (aged 81) Mayfair, London
- Party: Conservative
- Other political affiliations: Tory
- Parent(s): Samuel Dick; Charlotte Forster
- Education: Trinity College, Dublin

Quintin Dick (7 February 1777 – 26 March 1858) was an Irish Peelite, independent, Conservative, and Tory politician, and barrister.

== Family ==
Born in Dublin, Dick was the eldest child of East India merchant and proprietor Samuel Dick and Charlotte née Forster, daughter of Nicholas Forster. He graduated from Trinity College, Dublin with a BA in 1797, before becoming a barrister of King's Inns, Dublin, in 1800. He died at his home in Mayfair, London, in 1858, unmarried, leaving an estate worth almost £300,000.

== Political career ==
Over the course of 52 years, Dick represented six constituencies as a Member of Parliament, including one for the Parliament of Ireland. He was seen as "dandified and stiff, old-fashioned in dress as in politics" and his "lavishly illuminated" Mayfair dinners, leading to the nickname "Jolly Dick, the lamplighter"—commented upon by Benjamin Disraeli as unsuited to his habitual expression. Also known as "Carrotty Quintin" due to his wealth, Dick was unpopular.

=== Dunleer MP ===
Dick first entered politics as a representative for Dunleer in the Parliament of Ireland in March 1800, immediately opposing the Act of Union 1800. However, when that act passed later that year, unifying the parliaments of Ireland and Great Britain into the Parliament of the United Kingdom, Dunleer was disenfranchised and Dick left without a seat.

=== West Looe MP ===
However, upon inheritance of his father's wealth in 1802, Dick entered the UK Parliament in 1803 as an independent member for West Looe in Cornwall by purchase. Entering the Commons in 1804. Within a month of entering the House, he raised objections to debate on the Irish exchange and currency, arguing it diminished the public's confidence in the Bank of Ireland. Later that year, he also expressed some objection to William Pitt the Younger's additional force bill, voting against it in June, causing him to be listed as a Foxite and Grenvillite by Pitt's friends in September. However, by April 1805, he was voting with the government minority against Lord Melville's censure, and was then in July listed as a Pittite. He then held the seat until the 1806 general election when he did not seek re-election.

=== Cashel MP ===
Initially offering £5,000 for Tralee—a payment blocked by Viscount Castlereagh for his previous lack of support for the administration—Dick returned to parliament in 1807, becoming a Tory MP for the Irish borough of Cashel through a purchase from Henry Wellesley. However, this part of his career was also short-lived as he resigned in 1809 when unwilling to vote with the administration to block an investigation into Prince Frederick, Duke of York and Albany's alleged abuse of military patronage.

Although he saw his resignation as a matter of honour, he complained of receiving no rebate for vacating the seat, leading to a call from Radicals, namely William Madocks, for an inquiry into governmental abuse of power. Brought forward on 11 May 1809, the motion was defeated by a vote of 310 against to 85 for. Arthur Wellesley, the Chief Secretary for Ireland responded the next day, describing the failure as "rather a damper upon Jacobinism". Dick wrote to Madocks, as well as his kinsman John Foster, assuring them that the alleged corruption was "totally unfounded" and that accusations Spencer Perceval had put pressure on Dick to resign were wrong, and instead he had pressed him to remain in the house.

=== 1826 election ===
After a long period outside of Parliament, and being "thrown out of his gig and nearly killed" in August 1820, Dick sought election as a Tory professing independence at Maldon at the 1826. At first securing the support of Colchester Radical MP Daniel Whittle Harvey, on the basis his politics would be congenial, Dick stood on an anti-Catholic agenda. However, at the nomination he landed third, behind his fellow candidates Thomas Barrett-Lennard and George Allanson-Winn, and then came third and last at the eventual election, narrowly defeated by 53 votes.

The poll saw Dick and his fellow candidates rack up considerable bills, with more than £50,000 estimated to have been spent on transport, treating and admission fees. Dick himself spent £4,000 on tavern bills. Barrett-Lennard's electoral agent, who had admitted the Whigs' campaign had been "bad", also said the "purse of Mr. Dick" would lead to the seat only represented by those "who can afford to contest the place".

=== Orford MP ===
Charges were again levelled at him that he was "merely a wealth cat's paw" for the Tories, and later that year he paid an additional £4,000 to become MP for Orford at a by-election in 1826—called when "his friend" Horace Seymour chose to sit for Bodmin, which he had also been elected to at the general election. In this seat, Dick opposed Catholic emancipation right up to when Lord Hertford told his members to vote for it in 1829.

=== Maldon MP ===
At the 1830 general election, Dick left Orford to successfully seek election, unopposed, as a Tory at Maldon, alongside the Whig Thomas Barrett-Lennard.

The two members were on either side of the debate over the Grey ministry's Reform Bill—with Barrett-Lennard supporting and Dick opposing—which would see Maldon reduced to one seat. During a debate over the motion in the House of Commons, Dick made arguments against the partial disenfranchisement of the constituency, and it was at one point suggested it could be combined with Heybridge to create a viable two-member constituency but this was concluded unfeasible due to the high cost of the 1826 election. However, the Parliament Boundaries Act 1832 added Heybridge to the old borough, and the seat retained its two MPs.

While the Reform Act was designed to reduce corruption and remove rotten boroughs, in Maldon it increased the corruption by creating a "manageable and venal resident electorate", leading to every election being 1832 and the Reform Act 1867 being contested via an election petition. Despite this, becoming a Conservative in 1834 and a "peripheral" Young Englander in the 1840s, Dick retained the seat until the 1847 general election when he was defeated. Dick then sought election again in 1852 as an independent conservative, and 1854 as a Peelite.

=== Aylesbury MP ===
Nevertheless, Dick's protectionist record and money allowed him to gain the Aylesbury seat as a Conservative at a by-election in 1848, caused by the election of John Peter Deering being declared void due to treating. He held the seat until 1852.

== Military ==
Dick also served in the military, becoming captain of the West Essex militia in 1839, and Lieutenant-Colonel from 1846 to 1852.

Parliament of Ireland
Preceded by Henry Coddington; Thomas Foster	Member of Parliament for Dunleer; March 1800 – December 1800; With: Thomas Foster	Disenfranchised under the Act of Union 1800
Parliament of the United Kingdom
Preceded by James Buller; Thomas Smith	Member of Parliament for West Looe; 1803 – 1806; With: Ralph Daniell (1805–1806); James Buller (1803–1805)	Succeeded by Ralph Daniell; James Buller
Preceded by Archibald Primrose	Member of Parliament for Cashel; 1807 – 1809	Succeeded by Robert Peel
Preceded by Henry Frederick Cooke; Horace Seymour	Member of Parliament for Orford; 1826 – 1830; With: Henry Frederick Cooke	Succeeded by Henry Frederick Cooke; Spencer Kilderbee
Preceded by Hugh Dick; Thomas Barrett-Lennard	Member of Parliament for Maldon; 1830 – 1847; With: John Round (1837–1847); Thomas Barrett-Lennard (1830–1837)	Succeeded by Thomas Barrett-Lennard; David Waddington
Preceded by John Peter Deering; George Nugent-Grenville	Member of Parliament for Aylesbury; 1848 – 1852; With: Richard Bethell (1851–1852); Frederick Calvert (1850–1851); George Nugent-Grenville (1848–1850)	Succeeded by Richard Bethell; Austen Henry Layard
