= William Newton (MP for Ipswich) =

English politician

Member of Parliament for Ipswich
- In office 1818–1820

Personal details
- Born: c. 1783
- Died: 4 November 1862 (aged 78–79)
- Spouse: Elizabeth Milnes (m. 1811)
- Children: 10, including Alfred and Edward
- Education: Pembroke College, Oxford

William Newton (c. 1783 – 4 November 1862) was an English politician.

== Biography ==
He was the son of Samuel (or James) Newton, a well-to-do St Kitts slave owner from Stowey, Somerset. He was educated at Eton College and Pembroke College, Oxford. He settled in Suffolk in 1813 after his father purchased Elveden Hall, near Thetford from the 4th Earl of Albemarle.

He was elected member of parliament (MP) for Ipswich in 1818, narrowly defeating Henry Baring by 32 votes.

He was married 13 December 1811 in Ferry Fryston, Yorkshire. His wife Elizabeth (or Eliza) was the daughter of Richard Slater Milnes, MP for the city of York. William and Eliza had ten children; their fifth son Alfred Newton became a famous ornithologist, their sixth, Edward Newton, a colonial administrator.

On his death in 1862, Elveden Hall was sold to the Maharajah Duleep Singh.

Parliament of the United Kingdom
Preceded by John Round and Robert Crickitt	Member of Parliament for Ipswich; 1818–1820; With: Robert Crickitt	Succeeded by William Haldimand and Thomas Barrett-Lennard
