= Westhorpe House =

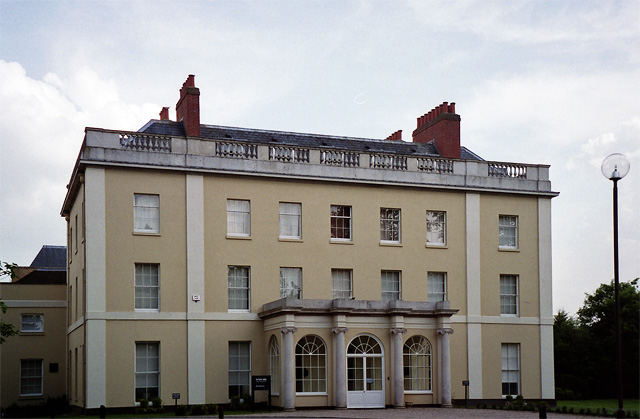
- Westhorpe House

- Location within Buckinghamshire

General information
- Status: Converted to flats
- Type: Historic England
- Architectural style: Classic
- Location: Little Marlow, Wycombe, Buckinghamshire, SL7, Little Marlow, United Kingdom
- Coordinates: 51°34′39″N 0°45′2″W
- Construction started: ~1700

Dimensions
- Other dimensions: 27,615 feet (8,417 m)

Website
- westhorpehouse.co.uk

Westhorpe House is a 31,937 square feet (2,967.0 m^{2}) Grade II listed building near Little Marlow which was the home of Maria Nugent and Field marshal Sir George Nugent. The Main House is 20,535 square feet (1,907.8 m^{2}) and the Coach House is 4,027 square feet (374.1 m^{2}).

== History ==
The house was built for James Chase MP in the classical style in about 1700. It became the home of Dr. Isaac Maddox, Bishop of Worcester, and then of Everard Fawkener, Postmaster General, and later of Alexander Wynch, Governor of Madras, during the 18th century. It was bought by Field marshal Sir George Nugent in October 1809. George and his wife Maria Nugent moved in 1815. Mary would die here in 1824 and she was buried in Little Marlow's church.

It passed to George Jackson, a landowner, in 1863 and later to Major Herbert Gordon, an officer in the 93rd Highlanders, who was still living there in 1925.

It is possible that the house was used as a prisoner of war camp during World War II.

It was the UK head office of Lexmark who vacated the house in 2004.

In March 2014 it was still being marketed as a potential company head office.
