= Maria Nugent =

American born diarist and art collector in the British empire

- Lady Nugent
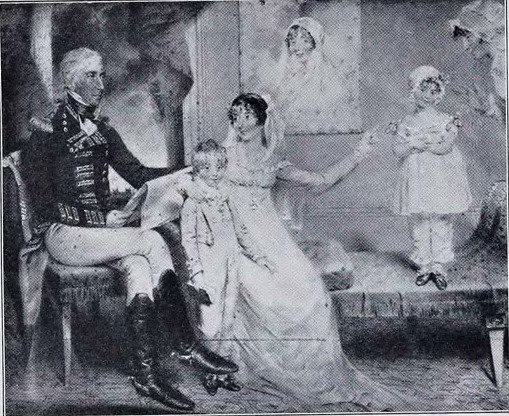
- Known for: Diaries describing her experiences in India and Jamaica
- Born: 1770/1771 colony of New Jersey
- Died: 1834; Westhorpe House
- Spouse: Sir George Nugent, 1st Baronet
- Issue: 5
- Father: Cortlandt Skinner
- Mother: Elizabeth Skinner

Maria, Lady Nugent (née Skinner; 1770/71 – 1834) was a diarist and art collector. She was born in the colony of New Jersey to a British loyalist family. She married British Army officer and later M.P. George Nugent and is known for her diary, which she wrote while he was Governor of Jamaica and later Commander-in-chief of India. Part of her diaries were published privately in 1839.

Her diaries written in India were published later, and her art collection was sold for £420,000 in 2020.

== Life ==
Nugent was born in either 1770 or 1771 in the colony of New Jersey. She was one of the twelve children born to Elizabeth (née Kearny) and Cortlandt Skinner, the attorney-general of New Jersey and a descendant of the Schuyler and Van Cortlandt families of British North America, When the American Revolutionary War ended in 1783, her father, who was a British loyalist, moved to Britain.

In 1801, she and her husband went to Jamaica, where he was lieutenant-governor and commander-in-chief. She wrote a journal before they returned in 1806. She became Lady Nugent when her husband was made a baronet. In 1812, they set sail to India, and they once went on a tour to inspect the territory. She rode on occasionally elephants while there, but was usually carried by servants in a single-poled sedan chair called a tonjon.

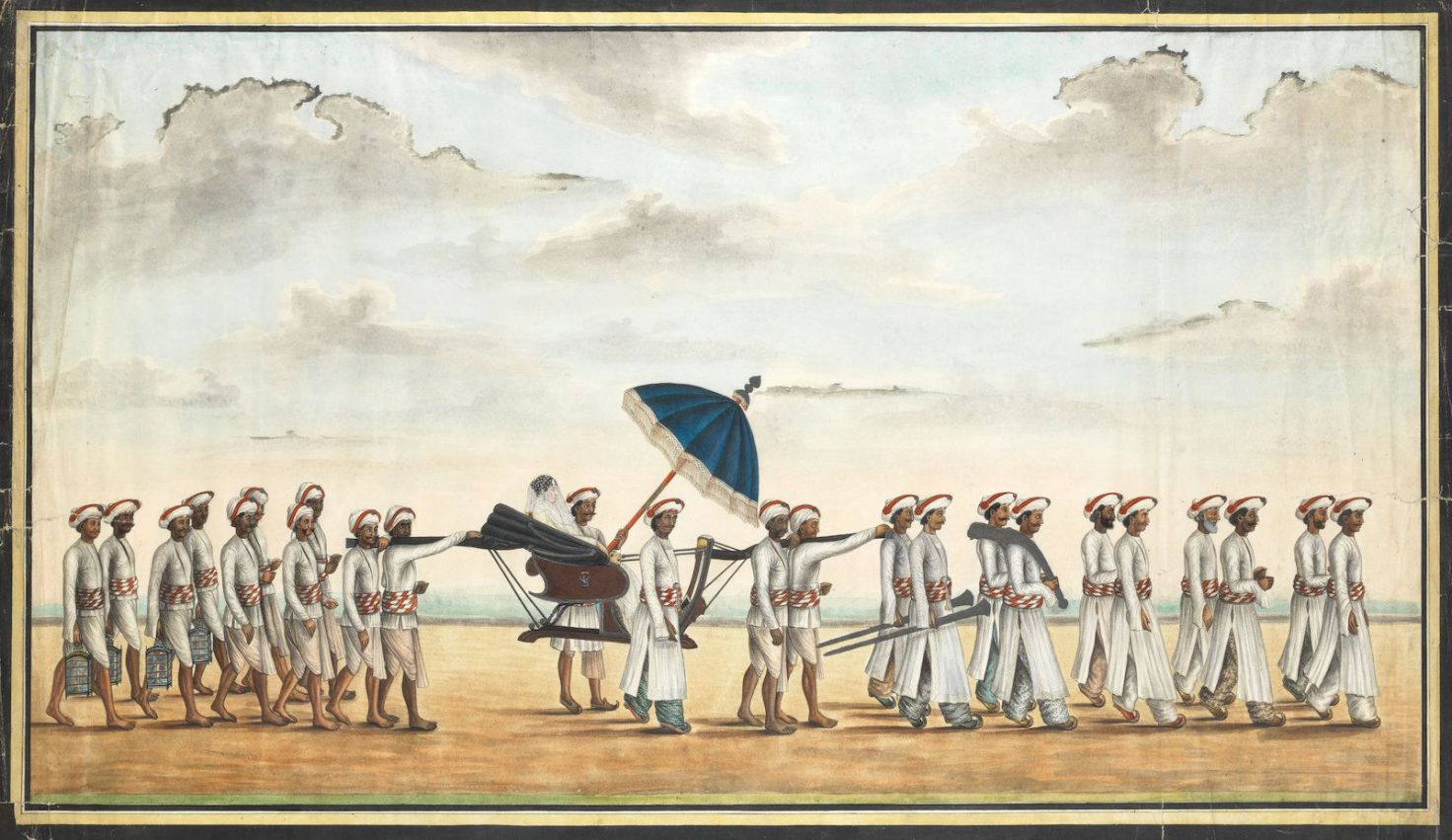
Maria, Lady Nugent in 1812 in a Palanquin with 24 bearers and attendants

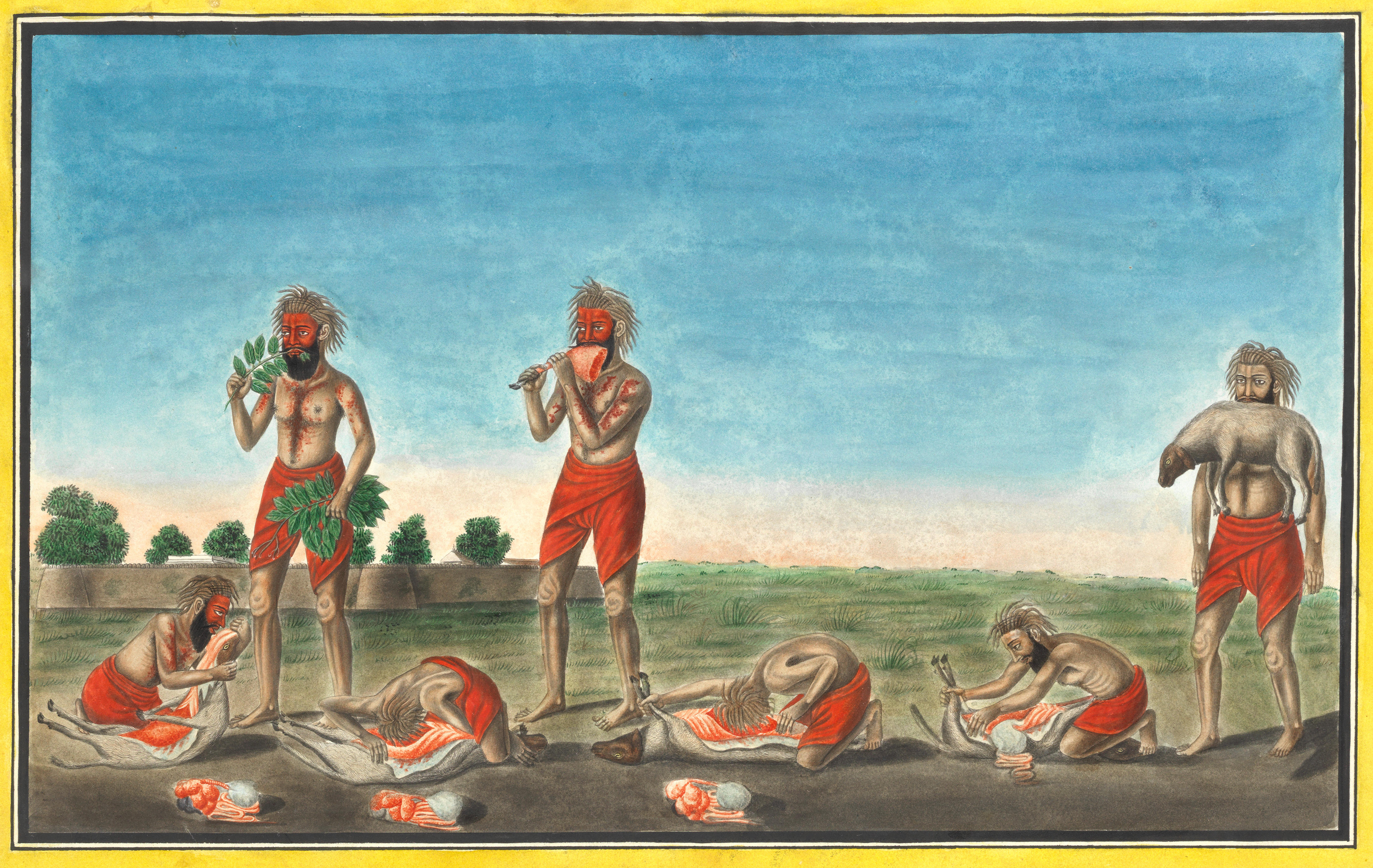
The famous sheep-eating fakir, Jurah Geer Berah Geer in 1800

Nugent had to leave her children behind when she went to India, including a six-week-old baby. While she was in India she met other powerful women, including the Mughal Emperor's wives and daughters; Munni Begum; Begum Johnson; and Begum Samru. Most British wives stayed in England, so she was unusual when she went to India. Her journal was written as if she intended it to be published, or at least as stories for her children to read when they were reunited. Her writing improved in detail and she recorded sights that she was unfamiliar with.

Lady Nugent collected paintings she had commissioned to illustrate things she had seen. Nine of these paintings that were passed down to her descendants were sold at an auction in 2020 for £420,000. A painting of her in a palanquin sold for over £60,000, whilst a painting of the famous sheep-eating fakir, Jurah Geer Berah Geer, dated to 1800, sold for over £75,000.

== Death and legacy ==
Lady Nugent died in 1834 at Westhorpe House, and she was buried at St John the Baptist's Church in Little Marlow.

Lady Nugent wrote a journal of her experiences in Jamaica, which was privately published in 1839 and made public in 1907.

In 2014, a critical version of her journal in India was published.

== Personal life ==
On 16 November 1797, she married George Nugent, who was an officer in the British Army and the member of Parliament for Buckingham.

They had three sons and two daughters, including:

- Sir George Edmund Nugent, 2nd Baronet (1802–1892), who married Maria Charlotte Ridley-Colborne, a daughter of Nicholas Ridley-Colborne, 1st Baron Colborne.
- Louisa Elizabeth Nugent (1803–1875), who married Thomas Fremantle, 1st Baron Cottesloe, the eldest son of Betsey and Adm. Sir Thomas Fremantle.
- Charles Edmund Nugent (1811–1890), who married Louisa Douglas Price, a daughter of Sir Rose Price, 1st Baronet.
- Maria Amelia Nugent, who married Rice Richard Clayton, the fourth son of Sir William Clayton, 4th Baronet.
