= Thomas Barrett-Lennard (politician) =

British Whig politician

Member of Parliament for Maldon
- In office 31 July 1847 – 10 July 1852 Serving with David Waddington
- Preceded by: Quintin Dick; John Round
- Succeeded by: Charles du Cane; Taverner John Miller
- In office 30 June 1826 – 26 July 1837 Serving with Quintin Dick (1830–1837); Hugh Dick (1827–1830); George Allanson-Winn (1826–1827)
- Preceded by: Joseph Strutt; Benjamin Gaskell
- Succeeded by: Quintin Dick; John Round

Member of Parliament for Ipswich
- In office 14 June 1820 – 17 June 1826 Serving with William Haldimand
- Preceded by: William Newton; Robert Alexander Crickitt
- Succeeded by: William Haldimand; Robert Torrens

Personal details
- Born: 4 October 1788
- Died: 9 June 1856 (aged 67) Brighton, Sussex
- Party: Whig
- Spouse(s): Mary Shedden (m. 1825; died 1844) Margaret Wharton (m. 1815; died 1818)
- Children: Five sons
- Parent(s): Thomas Barrett-Lennard; Dorothy St. Aubyn
- Education: Jesus College, Cambridge

Thomas Barrett-Lennard (4 October 1788 – 9 June 1856) was a British Whig politician.

== Family and early life ==
Born in 1788, Barrett-Lennard was the eldest of 12 children of his namesake, Thomas Barrett-Lennard (died 1857)—who himself was the illegitimate son and testamentary heir of his namesake Thomas Barrett-Lennard, 17th Baron Dacre (1717–1786)—and Dorothy née St. Aubyn, daughter of Sir John St. Aubyn, 4th Baronet.

Intended for a political life early on, he was educated at Charterhouse School from 1797 to 1804, and at Jesus College, Cambridge in 1806, and admitted to Inner Temple in 1809. He was guided for political life by the rector of Upminster, John Rose Holden, and his Cambridge contemporary, Henry Bickersteth, 1st Baron Langdale, who said, of Barrett-Lennard's future, "it is a sort of treason to yourself and your country when you neglect the opportunities fortunes has bestowed on you". He was then sent to Edinburgh for further studies "prior to entering Parliament".

He married twice, first to Margaret Wharton, daughter of Beverley Whig MP John Wharton, in 1815. Upon their marriage, his father granted him £1,200 a year, raising further to £2,000 when the couple travelled to Nice to search for a cure for tuberculosis, from which Margaret later died without issue at the Hotel des Etrangers. He later remarried to Mary Shedden, daughter of Bartlett Bridger Shedden, in 1825. They had five sons before she died in 1844: Thomas (1826–1919); Dacre (1829–1910); St. Aubyn (1831–1866); Charles Edward (1835–1874); and, John (1839–1898).

== Political career ==
Barrett-Lennard was first invited, by the sitting member Charles Powell Leslie, to stand for election in 1813 at a by-election in County Monaghan. Although Thomas Dawson, 1st Viscount Cremorne offered his influence, following canvassing Barrett-Lennard declined to go to a poll, paid his respects at Dublin Castle and returned to Belhus, Essex and Scotland.

He remained active politically, and in line with his family's support for the Whigs and Catholic emancipation, he campaigned for a county meeting in Essex to protest the Liverpool ministry's responses to the Peterloo massacre. This ultimately failed, partly due to a lack of support from the Whig county member, Charles Callis Western, who warned "you cannot mix up with the radicals with any comfort of safety".

Between 1820 and 1852, Barrett-Lennard spend much time as a member of parliament, becoming known as a man of "retired and studious habits", and "an advanced but independent Whig".

=== Ipswich MP ===
After joining Brooks' on Western's and Lord William Russell's recommendation in December 1819, he was first elected Whig MP for Ipswich in 1820, helped somewhat by influence from Henry Baring, John May and William May. At the election's hustings, he denounced ministerial corruption, high taxes, sinecures and repressive legislation passed in the wake of Peterloo, as well as called for free trade and parliamentary reform, arguing Ipswich was in danger of becoming a government borough.

==== Policies ====
Although he topped the poll with William Haldimand in the four-man contest, scrutiny led to him being relegated to third place. However, on petition, he was again declared elected. He became a regular attender and ready debate, voting against the Tory government and with the Whigs in almost every major division between 1820 and 1824, including supporting the 'Mountain' and Joseph Hume's campaigns for economy and retrenchment and becoming one of their spokesman on diplomatic expenditure, local courts, and a variety of issues affecting the city. He voted against the Barrack Agreement Bill in 1820, and divided for Catholic relief in 1821 and 1825. Thrice, he voted for parliamentary reform, in 1821, 1822 and 1823, while also campaigning for the disenfranchisement of Grampound, promising to make Leeds a scot and lot boroug" if it took over Grampound's seats.

While in Parliament, Barrett-Lennard also called for greater facilities for the public at the British Museum, voted for repeal of the additional malt duty, called for an inquiry and presented petitions from individuals injured at Peterloo, and petitioned against the English Poor Laws, among numerous other areas.

==== Caroline of Brunswick ====
In January 1821, he rebuked Caroline of Brunswick when he was asked to present the Ipswich address, forwarding this to Henry Vassall-Fox, 3rd Baron Holland. He also spoke against granting Caroline £50,000 a year from the consolidated fund, suggesting it should be paid from crown revenue or admiralty droits, and argued her treatment showed the need for legal and parliamentary reform. He later called for the Six Acts to be repealed on grounds of seditious meetings and libels, arguing that restricted county meetings had meant "public opinion has not been expressed with the openness and to the extent that it is hitherto". However, he lost the vote in Parliament, with 88 votes against and 66 votes for.

=== Maldon MP ===
In 1825, when the corporation of Ipswich told members they should henceforth bear the cost of expensive bailiwick elections, Barrett-Lennard resolved to never contest the borough. At the next general election in 1826 general election, while he campaigned for Robert Torrens and William Haldimand, Barrett-Lennard moved to contest Maldon as a Whig, or 'county interest' candidate. He was successful at the election, securing 1,455 votes and ending second out of three candidates.

In this seat, Barrett-Lennard voted against the Duke of Clarence's grant, the army estimates, and Catholic relief in 1827, and sat on the Galway Borough election committee, voting to refer the Irish estimates to a select committee. He supported George Canning's administration, but this left him at odds with his colleagues when he qualified his decision to vote against the repeal of the Six Acts by referring to his previous opposition when they were used to detain and prosecute Richard Carlile.

When Canning died, he was expected to support Lord Goderich, but aligned with the Huskissonites and the Duke of Wellington's ministry until May 1828. He continued to presented further petitions for the repeal of the Test Acts in 1828, and endorsed a pro-Catholic and anti-Friendly Societies Bill petitions in the same year. Other votes included favouring Catholic and Jewish emancipation, rejecting the Metropolitan Police Bill in 1829, and the Reform Act 1832, following which he was unsure whether to stand for Maldon or North Essex at the ensuing general election.

However, he chose to remain at Maldon—noting his father was standing for South Essex and "a borough and a seat for a father and son in the two divisions is too much for one family"—and held that seat until 1837. He returned to the seat 10 years later at the 1847 general election before losing the seat again at the next general election in 1852. Although he sought to regain the seat at a by-election in 1854, he was again unsuccessful.

== Other activities ==
Outside of Parliament, Barrett-Lennard spent much time in Brighton and on the continent, where his second wife, Mary, died while pregnant in Naples. Barrett-Lennard himself died in Brighton in April 1856, leaving his five sons, brother George, and Sarah Woodfield, with £50,000 charged from the family estates in Essex, Fermanagh and Norfolk.

Parliament of the United Kingdom
Preceded by William Newton; Robert Alexander Crickitt	Member of Parliament for Ipswich; 1820–1826; With: William Haldimand	Succeeded by William Haldimand; Robert Torrens
Preceded by Joseph Strutt; Benjamin Gaskell	Member of Parliament for Maldon; 1826–1837; With: Quintin Dick (1830–1837); Hugh Dick (1827–1830); George Allanson-Winn (1826–1827)	Succeeded by Quintin Dick; John Round
Preceded by Quintin Dick; John Round	Member of Parliament for Maldon; 1847–1852; With: David Waddington	Succeeded by Charles du Cane; Taverner John Miller
