= North Audley Street =

Street in London, England

- North Audley Street as seen from the corner of Grosvenor Square
- Interactive map of North Audley Street
- Coordinates: 51.512461°N 0.153113°W

North Audley Street is a street in the Mayfair area of London. Its southern end is the northwest corner of Grosvenor Square beyond which runs South Audley Street. The street's northern end is at Oxford Street beyond which it becomes Orchard Street.

== History and description ==
The buildings on the street were first laid out in the 1720s, developed as part of the Grosvenor Estate. The street was named for Hugh Audley whose estate in the area passed to the Grosvenor Family.

The street's west side was developed by Robert Andrews and Thomas Barlow, the estate agent and surveyor as part of a larger area, consisting of a number of narrow houses. It also included a significant house on the corner with North Row, known for a time as Clarendon House which was the home of a number of members of the nobility throughout the 18th century.

The street's east side was built by Edward Shepherd, of a mix of smaller and larger houses, it contains the only original survivor of the street in the Grade II* listed 11–12 North Audley Street, although the facade has since been remodelled by Thomas Lee in 1819 for Viscount Ebrington. The house's surviving Georgian interior, often attributed to Edward Lovett Pearce, is considered of particular interest. They were made for Jean Louis Ligonier, a Huguenot refugee and later Commander-in-Chief of the Army, lived there. No. 1, now demolished, stood as the first house on the street north of Grosvenor Square and included among its residents future prime minister Lord Palmerston and novelist Maria Edgeworth. Alongside the houses is the Grade I listed St Mark's Church of 1828, which now holds the Mercato Mayfair food court.

By the 1790s, the street was widely inhabited by tradespeople. Despite the nearby timber yards, workshops and a brewery, the street would retain some social prestige into the 19th century. In 1802, the street was the launch site of an early balloon flight demonstration by André-Jacques Garnerin and his wife Jeanne Geneviève Garnerin. The late 19th and early 20th centuries saw the wide-scale redevelopment of the street as mansion blocks above shops which gives the street its present character. The western side in particular was uniformly redeveloped with the buildings set back to widen the street.

== See also ==
- South Audley Street
