= Frederick Calvert (MP) =

British Whig politician

Frederick Calvert QC
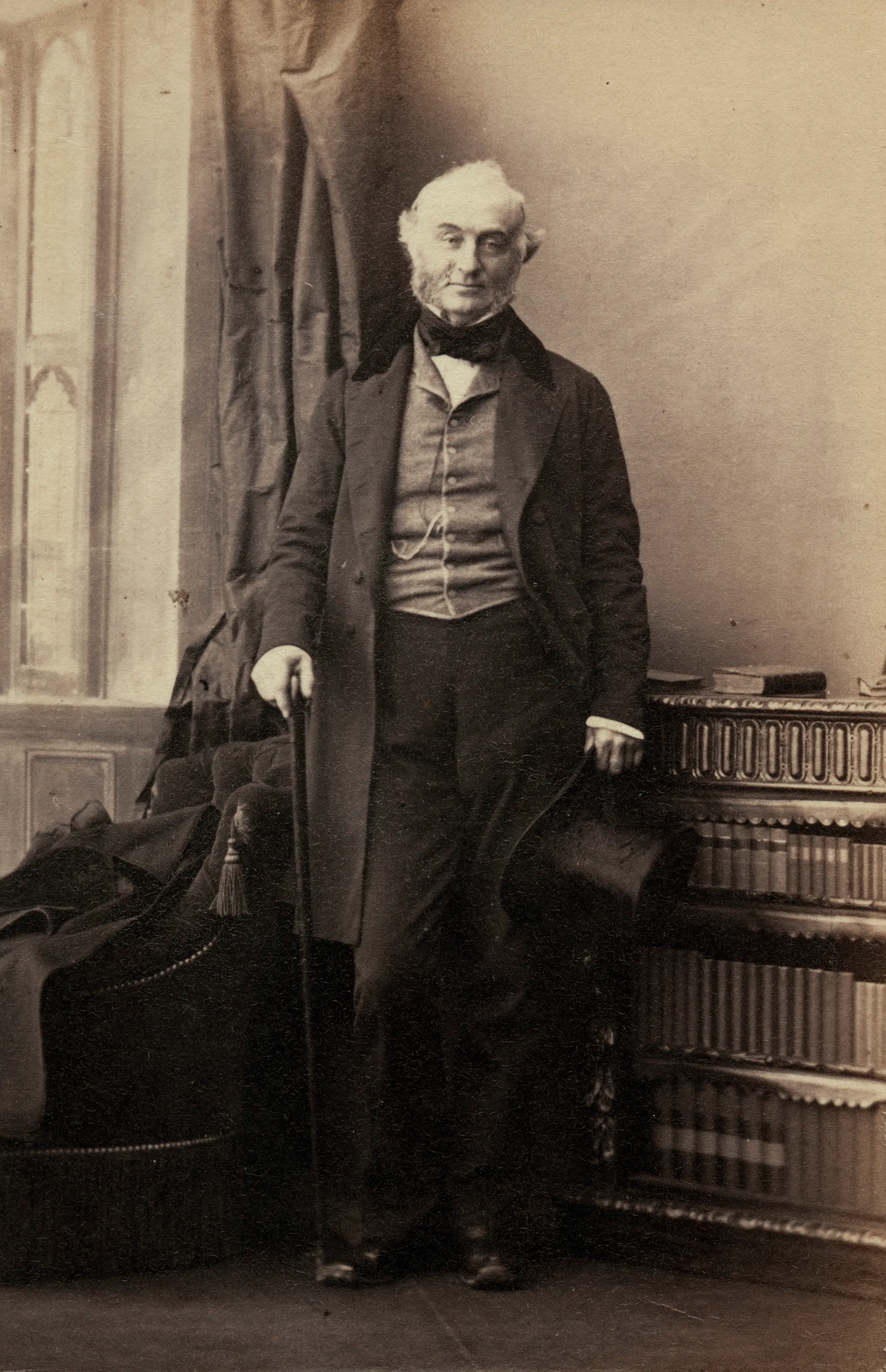
- Portrait by Camille Silvy, 1861

Member of Parliament for Aylesbury
- In office 27 December 1850 – 3 April 1851 Serving with Quintin Dick
- Preceded by: Quintin Dick; George Nugent-Grenville
- Succeeded by: Quintin Dick; Richard Bethell

Personal details
- Born: 9 June 1806
- Died: 6 June 1891 (aged 84)
- Party: Whig
- Spouse: Lucy Caroline Herbert (m. 1865)
- Parent(s): Harry Calvert; Caroline Hammersley
- Relatives: Harry Verney (brother)

Frederick Calvert QC (9 June 1806 – 6 June 1891) was a British Whig politician.

== Early life and family ==
Born 1806, Calvert was the second son of British general Harry Calvert and Caroline (née Hammersley), and the younger brother Harry Verney, Buckingham MP. He was called to the Bar at Inner Temple in 1831, and later made a Queen's Counsel. He married Lucy Caroline Herbert, daughter of Tory politician Edward Herbert and Lucy (née Graham) in 1865; they had no children.

He was educated at Christ Church, Oxford and Merton College, Oxford, where he was a president of the United Debating Society.

== Political career ==
Calvert was elected Whig MP for Aylesbury at a by-election in 1850, caused by the death of George Nugent-Grenville. However, he was unseated just a few months into the role after a petition-led inquiry found evidence of treating and bribery.

During his life, Calvert was also a Deputy Lieutenant for Buckinghamshire.

Parliament of the United Kingdom
Preceded by Quintin Dick; George Nugent-Grenville	Member of Parliament for Aylesbury; 1850–1851; With: Quintin Dick	Succeeded by Quintin Dick; Richard Bethell
