= Sir George Nugent, 1st Baronet =

British Army officer

Field Marshal Sir George Nugent GCB Bt
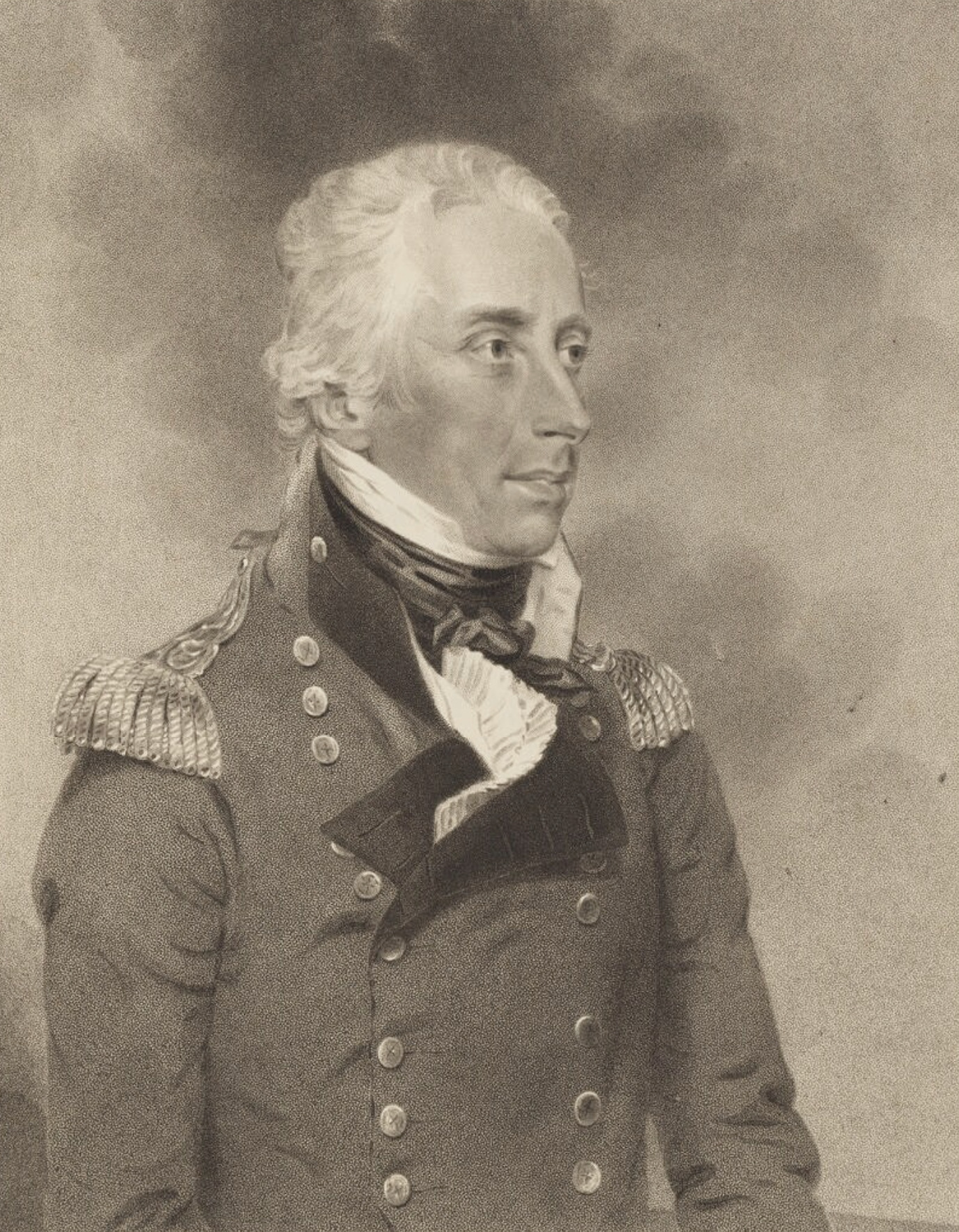
- Engraving by Richard Woodman after a John Downman portrait, 1825–1850

Member of Parliament for Buckingham
- In office 1818–1832 Serving with William Fremantle, Sir Thomas Fremantle, 1st Bt
- Preceded by: William Fremantle; James Hamilton Stanhope
- Succeeded by: Sir Thomas Fremantle, 1st Bt; Sir Harry Verney

Commander-in-Chief, India
- In office 1811–1813
- Preceded by: Forbes Champagné
- Succeeded by: The Earl of Moira

Governor of Jamaica
- In office 1801–1805
- Preceded by: The Earl of Balcarres
- Succeeded by: Sir Eyre Coote

Personal details
- Born: 10 June 1757
- Died: 11 March 1849 (aged 91) Westhorpe House, Buckinghamshire
- Spouse: Maria Skinner (m. 1797; died 1834)
- Relations: Thomas Fremantle, 2nd Baron Cottesloe (grandson)
- Children: 5
- Parent(s): Hon. Edmund Nugent; Ms. Fennings
- Education: Charterhouse School
- Alma mater: Royal Military Academy, Woolwich
- Awards: Knight Grand Cross of the Order of the Bath

Military service
- Allegiance: United Kingdom
- Branch/service: British Army
- Rank: Field Marshal
- Commands: 97th Regiment of Foot; 13th Regiment of Foot; 4th Royal Irish Dragoon Guards; Buckinghamshire Volunteers; Western District; Kent District; Commander-in-Chief, India
- Battles/wars: American Revolutionary War; Philadelphia campaign; Battle of Forts Clinton and Montgomery; French Revolutionary Wars

Field Marshal Sir George Nugent, 1st Baronet, GCB (10 June 1757 – 11 March 1849) was a British Army officer. After serving as a junior officer in the American Revolutionary War, he fought with the Coldstream Guards under the Duke of York during the Flanders Campaign. He then commanded the Buckinghamshire Volunteers in the actions of St. Andria and Thuyl on the river Waal and participated in the disastrous retreat from the Rhine. He went on to be commander of the northern district of Ireland, in which post he played an important part in preventing the outbreak of unrest in Belfast during the Irish Rebellion, and then became Adjutant-General in Ireland. He went on to be Governor of Jamaica, commander of the Western District in England, commander of the Kent District in England and finally Commander-in-Chief, India.

== Early life ==
Born the illegitimate son of Lieutenant Colonel the Hon. Edmund Nugent (who was the only son of Robert Nugent, 1st Earl Nugent) and a Ms. Fennings. His father had another illegitimate son, Admiral of the Fleet Sir Charles Edmund Nugent. His father's half sister, Mary Elizabeth Nugent, married George Nugent-Temple-Grenville, 1st Marquess of Buckingham. Through his Mary, he inherited the title of Earl Nugent. Lord Buckingham's aunt, Hester Grenville, had married William Pitt, who became Prime Minister of the United Kingdom.

Nugent was educated at Charterhouse School and the Royal Military Academy, Woolwich.

== Military career ==
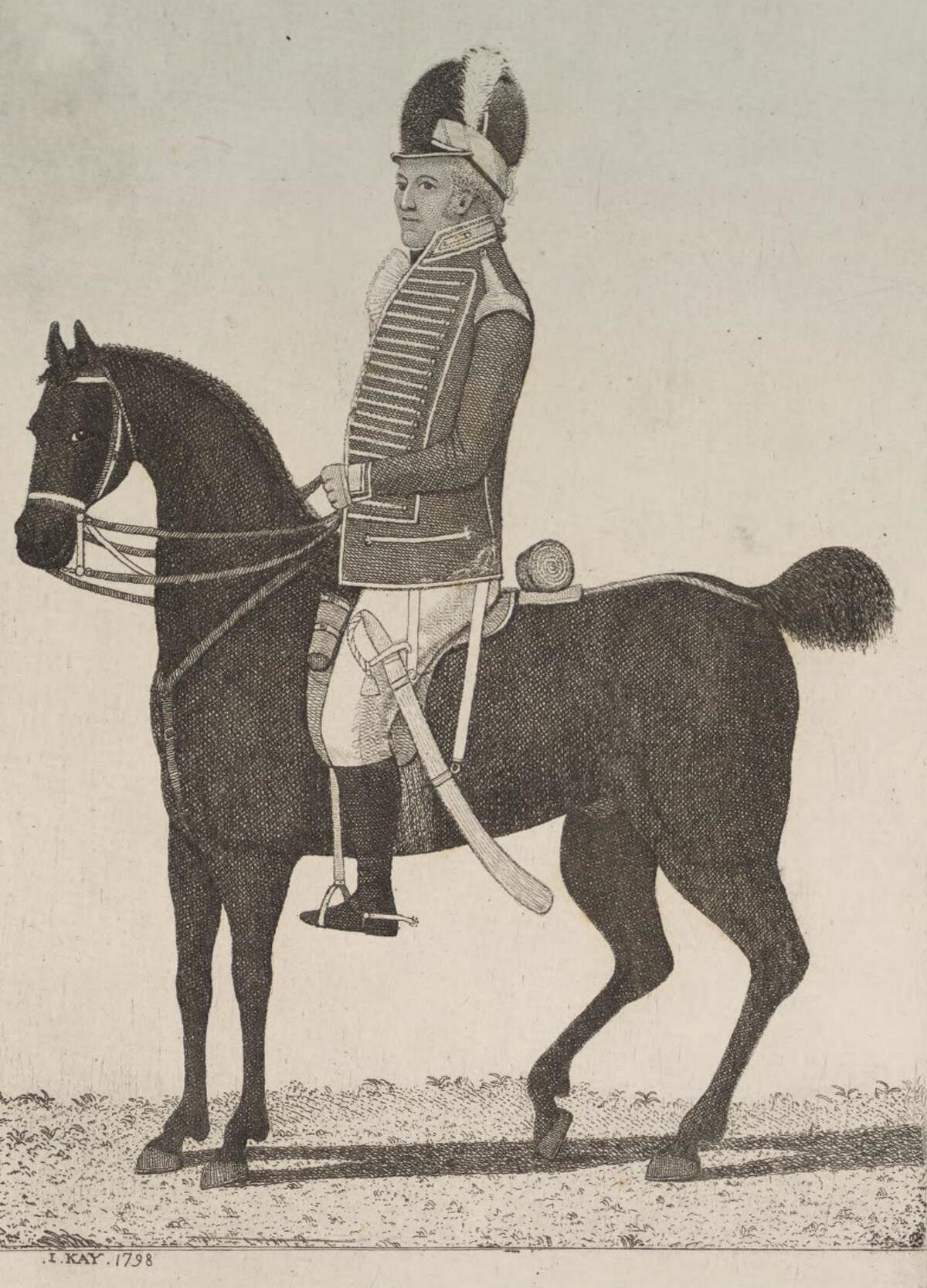
George Nugent, Pembroke Cavalry, 1798

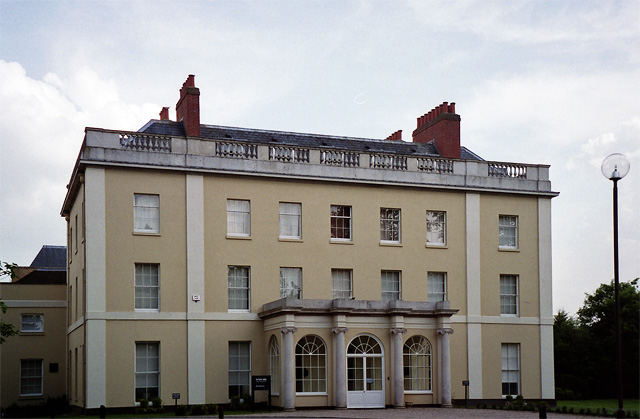
Westhorpe House where Nugent lived for over 40 years

He was commissioned as an ensign in the 39th Regiment of Foot on 5 July 1773 and was posted to Gibraltar. He transferred the 7th Regiment of Foot at New York with promotion to lieutenant in September 1777 and saw action at the Battle of Forts Clinton and Montgomery in October 1777 and then took part in the Philadelphia campaign during the American Revolutionary War. He continued to serve in North America and became a captain in the 57th Regiment of Foot on 28 April 1778 and a major in the same regiment on 3 May 1782.

=== Flanders and Ireland ===
Promoted to lieutenant colonel in September 1783, Nugent was appointed commanding officer of the 97th Regiment of Foot and returned to England, but in the post-war cost reductions the regiment was disbanded and he instead became commanding officer of the 13th Regiment of Foot in 1787. He became an aide-de-camp to his brother-in-law, the Marquess of Buckingham, who was serving as Lord Lieutenant of Ireland, in November 1787.

On Buckingham's departure from Ireland, Nugent became commanding officer of the 4th Royal Irish Dragoon Guards in 1789. Nugent became Member of Parliament for Buckingham in 1790. He exchanged into the Coldstream Guards as a company commander in October 1790 and served at the Siege of Valenciennes in May 1793, the Battle of Lincelles in August 1793 and the Siege of Dunkirk also in August 1793 under the Duke of York during the Flanders Campaign.

The War Office recalled Nugent to supervise the raising of the 85th Buckinghamshire Volunteers in March 1794. He commanded the regiment under Sir Ralph Abercromby in the action at Fort St. Andries, and with Major General David Dundas at Tuil on the river Waal and participated in the disastrous retreat from the Rhine. Promoted to major general on 1 May 1796, he became Captain of St Mawes Castle on 5 November 1796 and served in that role until his death. He went on to be commander of the northern district of Ireland in 1798, in which post he played an important part in preventing the outbreak of unrest in Belfast during the Irish Rebellion of 1798, and became Adjutant-General in Ireland in August 1799. He also represented Charleville, County Cork in the last Irish House of Commons before the Acts of Union 1800.

=== Later career ===
Nugent became Governor of Jamaica in April 1801 with promotion to local lieutenant general on 29 May 1802. While serving there, he strengthened the fort that had been built in 1709 in Harbour View. Named Fort Nugent, the fort guarded the eastern entrance of the city of Kingston Harbour, although all that remains there now is a Martello tower that was added after Nugent's departure. Promoted to the substantive rank of lieutenant general on 25 September 1803, Nugent returned to England in February 1806 and became commander of the Western District in England in August 1806. He was elected Member of Parliament (MP) for Aylesbury on 3 November 1806 and created a baronet of Waddesdon in the county of Buckinghamshire on 11 November 1806. He bought Westhorpe House in Buckinghamshire in October 1808 and became commander of the Kent District in England in July 1809.

Nugent stood down from his seat in Parliament to become Commander-in-Chief, India in January 1811.

Having been appointed a Knight of the Order of the Bath on 1 February 1813 and promoted to full general on 4 June 1813, Nugent was replaced as Commander-in-Chief by Lord Moira in October 1813. Nugent was relegated to the role of Commander of the Bengal Army but instead chose to return to England in October 1814. On return he unleashed a "skin-full of venom" against Lord Moira who in turn complained to the Prince Regent about Nugent's hostile behaviour. He was advanced to Knight Grand Cross of the Order of the Bath on 2 January 1815 and, having been elected Member of Parliament for Buckingham again in July 1818, he was awarded an honorary DCL by the University of Oxford in 1819. He finally retired from Parliament in 1832.

Nugent also served as honorary colonel of the 85th (Bucks Volunteers) Regiment of Foot, then as honorary colonel of the 62nd Regiment of Foot and later as honorary colonel of the 6th Regiment of Foot. Promoted to field marshal on 9 November 1846.

== Personal life ==
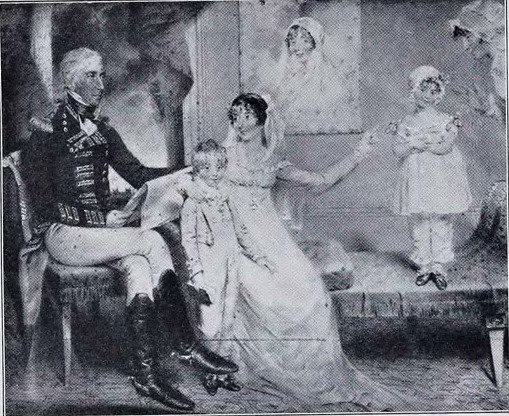
George Nugent, his wife Maria, and their children George and Louisa. Portrait by John Downman.

On 16 November 1797, Nugent was married to Maria Skinner (1771–1834) in Belfast. Maria was a daughter of Cortlandt Skinner, the Attorney-General of New Jersey and a descendant of the Schuyler and Van Cortlandt families of British North America, Together, they had three sons and two daughters, including:

- Sir George Edmund Nugent, 2nd Baronet (1802–1892), who married Maria Charlotte Ridley-Colborne, a daughter of Nicholas Ridley-Colborne, 1st Baron Colborne.
- Louisa Elizabeth Nugent (1803–1875), who married Thomas Fremantle, 1st Baron Cottesloe, the eldest son of Betsey and Adm. Sir Thomas Fremantle.
- Charles Edmund Nugent (1811–1890), who married Louisa Douglas Price, a daughter of Sir Rose Price, 1st Baronet.
- Maria Amelia Nugent, who married Rice Richard Clayton, the fourth son of Sir William Clayton, 4th Baronet.

George and Maria Nugent lived at Stowe and enjoyed a close friendship with his aunt and uncle, Lord and Lady Buckingham.

Lady Nugent, who died in 1834, wrote a journal of her experiences in Jamaica first published in 1907. Sir George died at Westhorpe House on 11 March 1849 and was buried at St John the Baptist Church in Little Marlow.

=== Descendants ===
Through his eldest son, he was a grandfather of Sir Edmund Charles Nugent, 3rd Baronet and through his daughter Louisa, he was a grandfather of Thomas Fremantle, 2nd Baron Cottesloe, Admiral Hon. Edmund Fremantle, and Hon. Augusta Mary Fremantle (wife of William Brodrick, 8th Viscount Midleton).

== Arms ==
Coat of arms of Sir George Nugent, 1st Baronet
Crest A cockatrice vert, collared or, pendent therefrom an escutcheon gules charged with a dagger erect as in the canton. Escutcheon Ermine two bars and a bordure engrailed gules on a canton of the last a dagger erect proper. Supporters Two cockatrice vert, collared or, pendent therefrom a shield gules charged with a dagger as in the canton. Motto Decrevi.

== Sources ==
- Clements, William (1999). Towers of strength: the story of the Martello towers. Leo Copper. ISBN 978-0850526790.
- Heathcote, Tony (1999). The British Field Marshals, 1736–1997: A Biographical Dictionary. Barnsley: Leo Cooper. ISBN 0-85052-696-5.
- Maxwell, W. H. (1881). History of the Irish Rebellion in 1798: With Memoirs of the Union, and Emmetts Insurrection in 1803. Ireland: G.Bell and sons.
- Smith, Henry Stooks (1851). An alphabetical list of the officers of the Eighty-Fifth, Bucks Volunteers, the Kings Light Infantry Regiment from 1800 to 1850. London: Simpkin, Marshall. ISBN 978-1110157846.
- The Universal Magazine of Knowledge and Pleasure .... (1798). United Kingdom: Published ... according to Act of Parliament, for John Hinton.

Parliament of Great Britain
Preceded by James Grenville; Charles Edmund Nugent	Member of Parliament for Buckingham; 1790–1801; With: James Grenville 1790; The Lord Bridport 1790–1796; Thomas Grenville 1796–1801	Parliament of Great Britain abolished
Parliament of Ireland
Preceded by Rogerson Cotter; Charles Boyle	Member of Parliament for Charleville; 1800–1801; With: Rogerson Cotter	Parliament of Ireland abolished
Parliament of the United Kingdom
New parliament	Member of Parliament for Buckingham; 1801–1802; With: Thomas Grenville	Succeeded by Thomas Grenville; Lord William Allen Proby
Preceded by James Du Pre; William Cavendish	Member of Parliament for Aylesbury; 1806–1812; With: George Cavendish 1806–1809; Thomas Hussey 1809–1812	Succeeded by Thomas Hussey; The Lord Nugent
Preceded by William Fremantle; James Hamilton Stanhope	Member of Parliament for Buckingham; 1818–1832; With: William Fremantle 1818–1827; Sir Thomas Fremantle, 1st Bt 1827–1832	Succeeded by Sir Thomas Fremantle, 1st Bt; Sir Harry Verney
Government offices
Preceded by The Earl of Balcarres	Governor of Jamaica; 1801–1805	Succeeded by Sir Eyre Coote
Military offices
Preceded by Forbes Champagné	Commander-in-Chief, India; 1811–1813	Succeeded by The Earl of Moira
Preceded by Edward Mathew	Colonel of the 62nd (Wiltshire) Regiment of Foot; 1805–1806	Succeeded by Eyre Coote
Baronetage of the United Kingdom
New title	Baronet (of Waddesdon); 1806–1849	Succeeded by George Edmund Nugent
