= Robert Alexander Crickitt =

British Member of Parliament (1784–1832)

Robert Alexander Crickitt was one of the two MPs for Ipswich in the United Kingdom Parliament from 1807 to 1820. He was a Tory.

Parliament of the United Kingdom
Preceded by Richard Wilson; Robert Stopford	Member of Parliament for Ipswich; 1807–1820; With: Home Riggs Popham; John Round; William Newton	Succeeded by William Haldimand and Thomas Barrett-Lennard
