= Rice Richard Clayton =

British Conservative politician

Member of Parliament for Aylesbury
- In office 28 June 1841 – 29 July 1847 Serving with Charles Baillie-Hamilton
- Preceded by: Charles Baillie-Hamilton; William Rickford
- Succeeded by: John Peter Deering; George Nugent-Grenville

Personal details
- Born: 15 November 1798 Harleyford, Buckinghamshire, England
- Died: 4 May 1879 (aged 80) Hedgerley Park, Buckinghamshire, England
- Party: Conservative
- Spouse: Maria Amelia Nugent (m. 1832)
- Parent(s): Sir William Clayton, 4th Baronet; Mary East
- Education: Gonville and Caius College, Cambridge; Eton College

Rice Richard Clayton (15 November 1798 – 4 May 1879), sometimes Richard Rice Clayton, was a British Conservative politician.

Born in Harleyford, Buckinghamshire, Clayton was the fourth son of Sir William Clayton, 4th Baronet and Mary née East. He was first educated at Eton College, before attending Gonville and Caius College, Cambridge, graduating with a Bachelor of Arts in 1820 and a Master of Arts in 1824. He also entered Lincoln's Inn in 1819.

In 1832, he married Maria Amelia Nugent, daughter of Maria, Lady Nugent and Sir George Nugent, 1st Baronet, and they had at least six children

- Capt. Richard Nugent (3 Sep 1833-Feb 1914). Unmarried.
- George Augustus (1840-3 March 1918), who married Elizabeth Godbere but had no issue.
- Edward Everard (1842-Jul 1875)
- Maria Augusta (d. 13 Nov 1875),
- Francis Edmund (Dec 1844-11 Apr 1905), who married Eliza Liggins, and had one known daughter, Leila Cecilia -She married her cousin Sir Harold Dudley Clayton, 10th Baronet.
- Arthur John (5 Dec 1846-22 Dec 1922), who married Alice Rose Jones, and by her had three daughters.
- Louisa Maude (c. 1847-8 Jul 1923), Francis Arthur Hervey, son of Lord William, and grandson of both Frederick Hervey, 1st Marquess of Bristol and Vice Adm. Thomas Fremantle. They had three children.
- Emily Rose (c. 1847-27 Dec 1936), who married James Melvill Davidson but had no known issue.

Clayton became a Conservative MP for Aylesbury at the 1841 general election but was defeated at the next general election in 1847.

During his life, Clayton was also a Justice of the Peace and Deputy Lieutenant for Buckinghamshire, as well as a High Sheriff for the same county in 1838.

Parliament of the United Kingdom
| Preceded by Charles Baillie-Hamilton; William Rickford | Member of Parliament for Aylesbury; 1841–1847; With: Charles Baillie-Hamilton | Succeeded by John Peter Deering; George Nugent-Grenville |
