= William Haldimand =

William Haldimand (9 September 1784 – 20 September 1862) was an English philanthropist, director of the Bank of England, and Member of Parliament. He was the brother of Jane Marcet, a popular writer on science and economics.

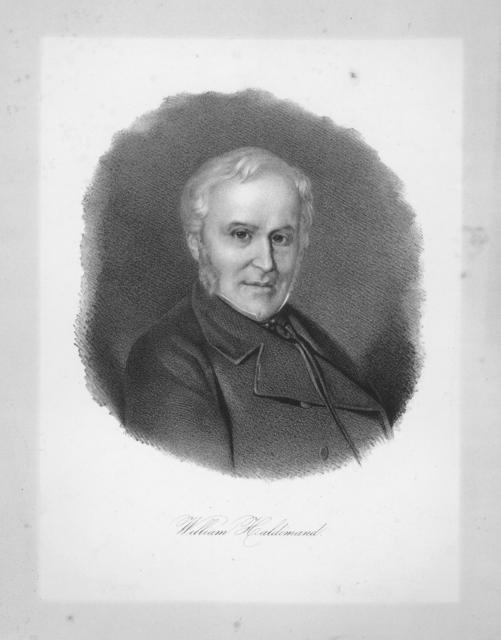
William Haldimand

== Life ==
He was the son of Anthony Francis Haldimand (1741–1817), a London merchant, nephew and heir of Sir Frederick Haldimand. He was one of twelve children, most of whom died young, and was born in London 9 September 1784. At sixteen he entered his father's counting-house, showed talent for business, and at twenty-five became a director of the Bank of England.

Haldimand was an advocate of the resumption of specie payments, and gave evidence in the parliamentary inquiry which led to the Resumption of Cash Payments, etc. Act 1819 (59 Geo. 3. c. 49). In 1820 he was elected Member of Parliament for Ipswich, and was re-elected in 1826, but when the return was disputed he gave up the seat.

In 1828 Haldimand settled permanently at his summer villa, Denantou, near Lausanne. He supported Greek independence, sending the insurgents of the Greek War of Independence funds by his nephew, and guaranteeing Admiral Thomas Cochrane £20,000 to equip a fleet. A visit to Aix-les-Bains for his health resulted in his erecting there in 1829 a hospital for poor patients. The municipality gave it his name; but after the annexation of Savoy to France from the Kingdom of Piedmont-Sardinia, it was styled the Hortense Hospital, Queen Hortense having endowed it.

Purchases of French rentes, made to strengthen the new Orleans dynasty, involved Haldimand in losses. He gave £24,000 for a blind asylum at Lausanne, with more after his death, and £3,000 towards the erection of an Anglican church at Ouchy. Inclined to radicalism in politics and to scepticism in religion, he nevertheless exerted himself in favour of the free church in Vaud, threatened with state persecution. He died unmarried at Denantou on 20 September 1862 aged 78.

== Notes ==
Attribution

This article incorporates text from a publication now in the public domain: Stephen, Leslie; Lee, Sidney, eds. (1890). "Haldimand, William". Dictionary of National Biography. Vol. 24. London: Smith, Elder & Co.

Parliament of the United Kingdom
Preceded by William Newton and Robert Crickitt	Member of Parliament for Ipswich; 1820–1827; Served alongside: Thomas Barrett-Lennard	Succeeded by Robert Adam Christopher and Charles Mackinnon
