= Mercato Metropolitano =

Food hall in London, England

Coordinates: 51.4985°N 0.0984°W

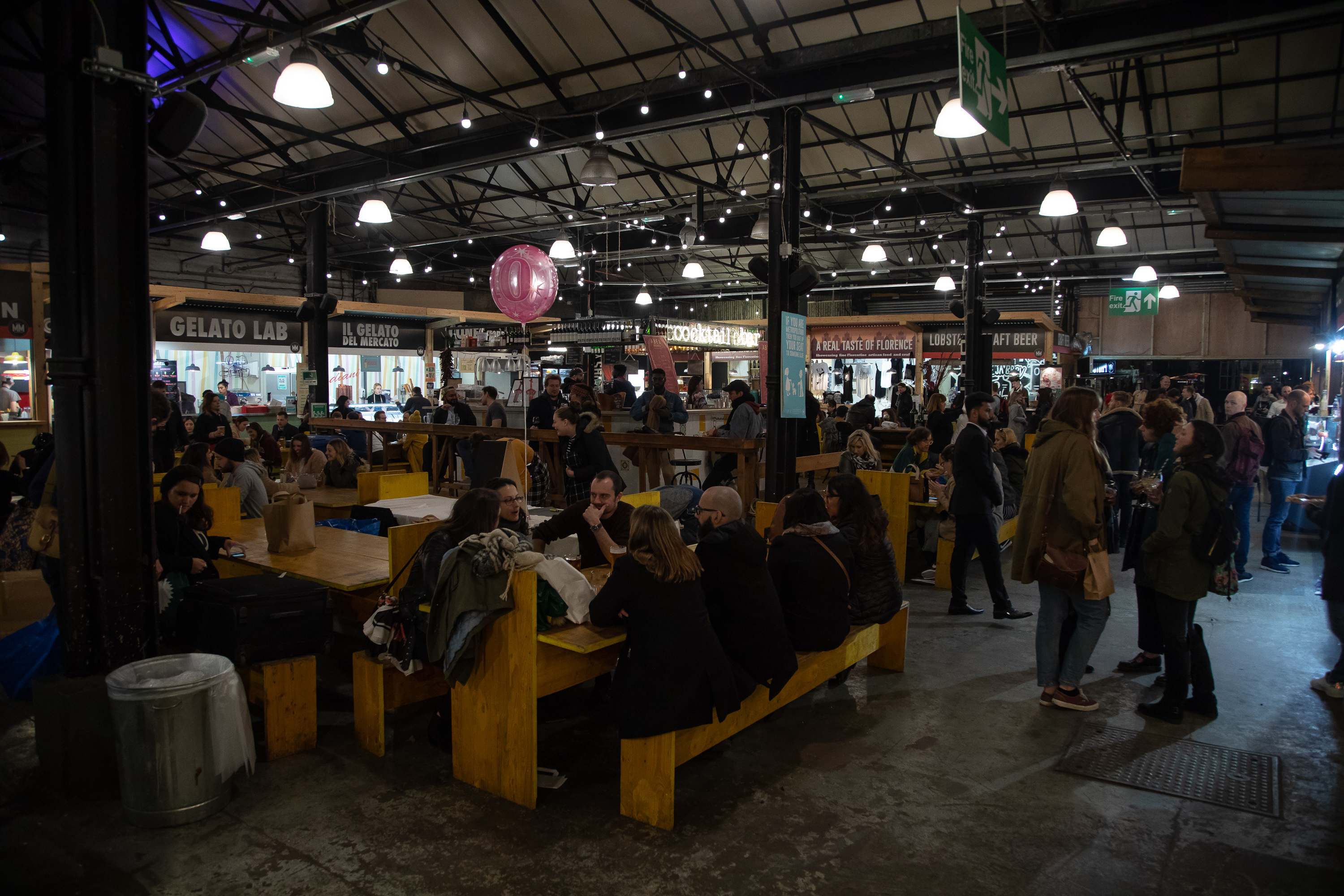
Inside Mercato Metropolitano

Mercato Metropolitano is a food hall founded in Elephant and Castle, London in 2016, located inside a former papermaking factory.

The food hall provides various options of fresh foods and meals including an Italian foods shop and market stalls.

A second location opened at the end of 2019 in St Mark's, Mayfair, followed by a third location at Wood Wharf in summer 2021.

In 2025, plans were approved by Southwark to demolish the original venue of Mercato Metropolitano as part of the Borough Triangle development, a controversial decision which was contested by locals, being seen as one of the only attractions left in Elephant and Castle and its closure as a "significant loss to the community". Part of the planned development includes a replacement food hall but there are no plans for a venue to host vendors during construction. In late 2025, Mercato Metropolitano announced it would continue running through 2026.

A docu-series, "Unknown Chefs" released in 2025 explored the stories of four chefs at Mercato Metropolitano, prompting plans to open a filming studio.
