= Michael Gandy (architect) =

English architect

Michael Gandy (1778–1862), was an English architect, who worked for many years as an assistant to Sir Jeffrey Wyatville.

== Life ==
Gandy was the son of Thomas Gandy (c.1744–1814) and Sophia née Adams (c.1743–1818) and younger brother of Joseph Michael Gandy and of John Peter Gandy-Deering. He was born in 1778. He became a pupil of James Wyatt, whose office he left on receiving an appointment in the Indian naval service. He was thus employed for some years, serving in India and China. In 1812 he exhibited The Burning of Onrust and Kupers Island, Batavia, in 1800, drawn on the spot at the Royal Academy.

On his return he was employed for some time in the drawing-office of Mr. Holl, civil architect to the navy, afterwards by Francis Goodwin and eventually by Sir Jeffrey Wyatville, with whom he remained for thirty-three years, until Wyattville's death in 1840.

In 1842, with Benjamin Baud, he published Architectural Illustrations of Windsor Castle, with plates showing Wyatville's alterations to the castle; the text was by John Britton.

In 1805 he married Susannah Stutsbury (1786–1841).

He died in April 1862.
