= James Buller (1772–1830) =

British Member of Parliament

Member of Parliament for West Looe
- In office 28 August 1802 – 23 January 1805 Serving with Thomas Smith; Quintin Dick
- Preceded by: Sitwell Sitwell
- Succeeded by: Ralph Daniell
- In office 13 December 1806 – 29 September 1812 Serving with Ralph Daniell
- Preceded by: Quintin Dick
- Succeeded by: Joseph Sydney Yorke

Personal details
- Born: 9 November 1772
- Died: 14 November 1830 (aged 58)
- Spouse: Mary (m. 1795)
- Parent: John Buller (father)
- Education: Westminster School, Inner Temple
- Occupation: Lawyer and politician

James Buller (9 November 1772 – 14 November 1830) was a British politician and Member of Parliament for West Looe between 1802 and 1805 and a further term between 1806 and 1812.

== Early life ==
Buller was educated at Westminster School and the Inner Temple, being called to the bar in 1795. He married his wife Mary on 23 June 1795. Buller served as a Commissioner of Bankruptcy between c. 1797 until 1807.

== Parliamentary career ==
Buller was elected as the MP for West Looe at the 1802 general election, standing down in 1805 to allow Ralph Daniell to take a seat. In 1806, he re-stood for the seat taking over from Quintin Dick.

Following his leaving Parliament, Buller served as the Clerk in Ordinary to the Privy Council from January 1812 until his death in 1830.

== Personal life ==
James Buller was the third son of John Buller, coming from the Buller family with long ties to Parliament.
