= John Weskett =

English underwriter

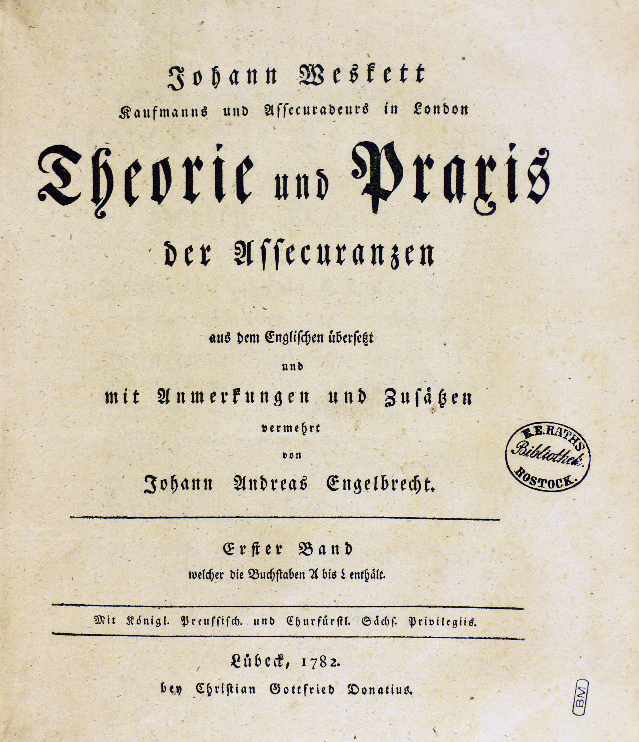
Title page of Theorie und Praxis der Assecuranzen, the German translation of A Complete Digest of the Theory, Laws, and Practice of Insurance (1782)

John Weskett was an English underwriter and merchant who contributed to the understanding of insurance law in the eighteenth century.

Weskett was probably born in Leeds. It is believed to have lived between 1730 and 1800.

== Marine insurance average ==
Weskett offered a definition of the term average in A Complete Digest of the Theory, Laws, and Practice of Insurance, (1781):

"Average means the accidents and misfortunes which happen to ships and their cargoes, from the time of their lading and sailing till their return and unlading. It is divided into three kinds : first, the simple, or particular, average, which consists in the extraordinary expenses incurred, either for the ship alone, or for the merchandize alone. Such is the loss of anchors, masts, and rigging, occasioned by the common accidents at sea; the damages which happen to merchandize by storms, capture, shipwrecks, wet, or rotting: all which must be paid by the thing that suffered the damage. Secondly, the large, or common, called gross, or general average, being those expenses incurred, and damages sustained, whether by ship or by goods, or by both, for the common good, security, and preservation both of the merchandize and vessel; consequently to be borne by the ship, freight, and cargo, and to be regulated and proportioned upon the whole. Thirdly, the small, or petty average, which means expenses for towing and piloting the ship out of or into harbours, creeks, or rivers, and other port charges : one-third of these must be charged to the ship, and two-thirds to the cargo. It also signifies a small duty which merchants who send goods in another man's ship pay to the master for his care of them, over and above the freight; hence it is expressed in the bills of lading, as paying so much freight for the said goods, with primage and average as accustomed."

== Criticism ==
Weskett has been criticised for normalising the dehumanisation and commodification of enslaved Africans, for example Robin Pearson and David Richardson (2019) in "Insuring the Transatlantic Slave Trade" or Saidiya Hartman in Lose Your Mother: A Journey Along the Atlantic Slave Route (2007)

== Works ==
- 1781 A Complete Digest of the Theory, Laws, and Practice of Insurance, London: Frys, Couchman and Collier, 1781.
