= Simon Mayne (c.1644–1725) =

MP for Aylesbury

The Right Honourable Simon Mayne

Member of Parliament for Aylesbury
- In office 6 April 1691 – 28 January 1696 Serving with Sir Thomas Lee, 2nd Bt
- Preceded by: Sir Thomas Lee, 1st Bt
- Succeeded by: James Herbert
- In office 1705–1710 Serving with Sir John Wittewronge, 3rd Bt
- Preceded by: Simon Harcourt, Sir Henry Parker, 2nd Bt
- Succeeded by: Simon Harcourt, John Essington

Personal details
- Born: circa. 1644 Dinton, Buckinghamshire, England
- Died: 1725
- Resting place: Dinton, Buckinghamshire
- Spouse: Elizabeth Browne
- Parents: Simon Mayne (father); Elizabeth (mother)

Simon Mayne (c. 1644 – 1725) was MP for Aylesbury from 6 April 1691 to 28 January 1696 and again from 1705 to 1710.

| Preceded by Sir Ralph Verney, 1st Bt | Member of Parliament for Aylesbury; 1645; With: Thomas Scot | Succeeded by |
| Preceded by William Egerton | Member of Parliament for Aylesbury; 1691–1695; With: Sir Thomas Lee, 2nd Bt | Succeeded by James Herbert |
| Preceded by Sir Henry Parker, 2nd Bt | Member of Parliament for Aylesbury; 1705–1710; With: Sir John Wittewronge, 3rd Bt | Succeeded by John Essington |
