= William Borlase (died 1629) =

English politician

Sir William Borlase (1566 – 4 September 1629) was an English politician of the Borlase family who sat in the House of Commons between 1604 and 1614.

Borlase was the son of John Borlase of Little Marlow, Buckinghamshire. He matriculated at Magdalen College, Oxford, on 17 November 1581. He was a student of Gray's Inn in 1584, described as being of Little Marlow (in Buckinghamshire). By 1588 he was married to Mary Backhouse, sister of his brother-in-law Samuel Backhouse.

He succeeded to his father's estate in 1593 and subsequently became a justice of the peace for Buckinghamshire. He was probably the William Borlase who served as a Captain of the Buckinghamshire Trained Bands when they were called out during an invasion scare in 1599.

In 1601-2 he served as High Sheriff of Buckinghamshire. He was among the local gentry knighted on 28 June 1603, during the visit of James I and Anne of Denmark to John Fortescue of Salden.

In the parliament of 1604-10 he sat as member of parliament for Aylesbury through the patronage of John Pakington (died 1625). He was comparatively active, although his only recorded speeches were on the subject of Purveyance. He sat for Buckinghamshire in 1614, but appears to have been less active.

In 1624 he founded Sir William Borlase's Grammar School on its present site in memory of his son Henry Borlase, MP for Marlow, who died in that year.

Borlase died in September 1629 and was buried at Little Marlow. He was the father of Henry Borlase and William Borlase.

Parliament of England
Preceded by John Lyly; Richard More	Member of Parliament for Aylesbury; 1604; With: Sir William Smith	Succeeded by Sir John Dormer; Samuel Backhouse
Preceded by William Fleetwood; Anthony Tyringham	Member of Parliament for Buckinghamshire; 1614; With: Sir Francis Goodwin	Succeeded by Sir Francis Goodwin; Sir William Fleetwood
Political offices
Preceded by Thomas Denton	High Sheriff of Buckinghamshire; 1601–1602	Succeeded by Anthony Chester
