= Thomas Crawley =

Thomas Crawley may refer to:

- Thomas Crawley (MP) (died 1559), member of parliament for Aylesbury
- Thomas Cranley or Craule (c. 1337–1417), Archbishop of Dublin
- Thomas Crawley, of SS Kate
- Tom Crawley (1911–1977), Scottish footballer
