= John Dormer (of Dorton) =

British politician (1556–1626)

Sir John Dormer (18 October 1556 – 10 March 1626) was an English landowner and politician who sat in the House of Commons in two periods between 1604 and 1622.

== Biography ==
Dormer was the son of William Dormer of Thame, Oxfordshire and grandson of Sir Michael Dormer who was Lord Mayor of London in 1541. Sir John Dormer built a mansion at Dorton, Buckinghamshire and was High Sheriff of Buckinghamshire in 1597. He was knighted at Charterhouse on 11 May 1603.

In 1604, he was elected Member of Parliament for Clitheroe. He was elected MP for Aylesbury 1614 and again in 1621.

Dormer married Jane Giffard and had a son Robert, who became High Sheriff of Oxfordshire.

Dormer died in 1626 and was buried at Long Crendon north of Thame where there is an effigy.

Parliament of England
Preceded by John Osbaldestone; Anthony Dering	Member of Parliament for Clitheroe; 1604–1611; With: Martin Lister	Succeeded by Sir Gilbert Hoghton; Clement Coke
Preceded by Sir William Borlase; Sir William Smith	Member of Parliament for Aylesbury; 1614–1622; With: Samuel Backhouse 1614; Henry Borlase 1621–1622	Succeeded by Sir John Pakington; Sir Thomas Crewe
Political offices
Preceded by Anthony Tyringham	High Sheriff of Buckinghamshire; 1598	Succeeded by William Garrard
