= Richard Anderson (English MP) =

MP for Aylesbury

The Right Honourable Richard Anderson

Member of Parliament for Aylesbury
- In office 1685–1689 Serving with William Egerton
- Preceded by: Sir Thomas Lee, 1st Bt, Richard Ingoldsby
- Succeeded by: Sir Thomas Lee, 2nd Bt, Richard Beke

Personal details
- Born: April 1659
- Died: 1695
- Resting place: Aldbury
- Party: Tory
- Spouse: Elizabeth Spencer
- Parents: Sir Richard Anderson, 2nd Baronet (father); Elizabeth Hewett (mother)

Richard Anderson (April 1659 – 1695) was the English MP for Aylesbury from 1685 till 1689.

== Biography ==
Richard Anderson was the second son of Sir Richard Anderson, 2nd Baronet of Penley and Elizabeth Hewett, the daughter of Sir Thomas Hewett, 1st Baronet. On 22 July 1679, he married Elizabeth Spencer, the daughter of Richard Spencer, a vintner in Berry Street, Aldgate, London.

Anderson was elected MP for Aylesbury in James II's parliament in 1685 as a Tory.

Political offices
| Preceded by Sir Thomas Lee, 1st Bt; Richard Ingoldsby | United Kingdom with William Egerton; 1685–1689 | Succeeded by Sir Thomas Lee, 2nd Bt; Richard Beke |
