= Samuel Backhouse =

English merchant, country gentleman and MP

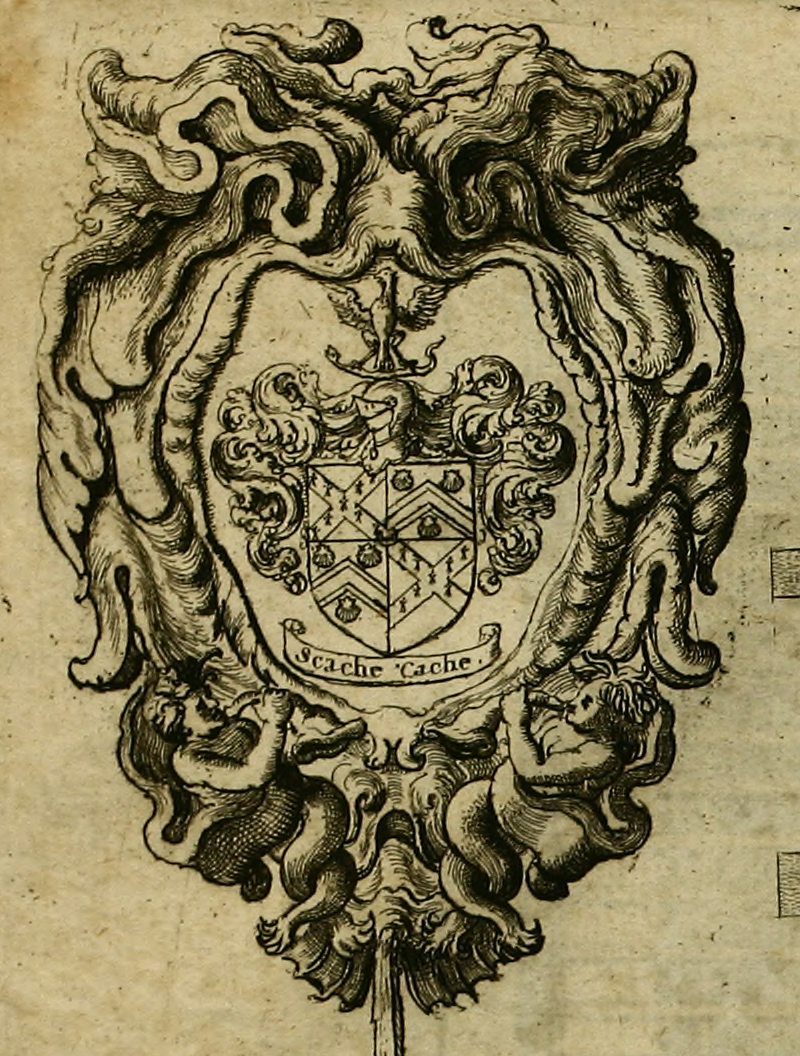
Coat of arms of Samuel Backhouse's son, William. From William Dugdale's The History of St. Pauls Cathedral in London (1658). The motto is likely William's own invention, but the arms are the family's.

Samuel Backhouse (sometimes Bacchus or Bakehouse; bapt. 18 Nov. 1554 – 24 June 1626) was an English merchant who later became a country gentleman based in the county of Berkshire. He was a member of Parliament (MP) twice early in James I's reign, first for New Windsor in 1604 and then for Aylesbury in 1614.

Backhouse was brought up in the prominent Backhouse family of the North of England, son of a wealthy London Alderman and Grocer. Educated at Oxford, he first came into a sum of land upon his father's death, in 1580. The next sum came after marrying Elizabeth Borlase, member of the Buckinghamshire gentry, as he purchased the manor of Swallowfield in order to reside closer to his new affinial relatives. Here Backhouse lived the life of a country gentleman, fulfilling several minor municipal duties and, in 1600, entertaining the Queen as Sheriff of Berkshire.

Perhaps emboldened by his successes as a country gentleman in Berkshire, Backhouse entered parliament. His first stint in parliament, during the Blessed Parliament of 1604–10, saw him nominated to fifty committees, though he was not recorded as giving any speeches. In the much shorter Addled Parliament of 1614, Backhouse was nominated to another nine committees, but again remained a silent MP.

After the Addled Parliament, Backhouse did not seek reelection, and soon returned to Swallowfield. It is known that he became a shareholder of the New River Company in 1619 and engaged in a minor familial dispute regarding the parish church; he perhaps also cultivated associates interested in esotericism.

Following his in death 1626, Backhouse's lands passed to his eldest son John, and when John died without heirs, to his youngest, William. William's only child not to predecease him—Flower—died childless, thus ending Backhouse's line.

== Early life and education ==
Samuel Backhouse was baptised on 18 November 1554, the son of Nicholas Backhouse and his first wife, Anne (daughter of Thomas Curzon of Croxall). Samuel was born into the wealthy Backhouse family of Northern England. Its earliest known member, was one Thomas Backhouse of Cumberland, Samuel's grandfather. Nicholas Backhouse was granted a confirmation of arms on 27 March 1574, which stated the family "lange tyme past did come out of Lancashere where they were of worshippful degree". Nicholas Backhouse was a merchant and is referred to in this grant as "of London Grocer". In 1578, he became a Sheriff and Alderman of London, leading historian C. H. Josten to conclude that he "must have been a man of considerable wealth and standing".

Backhouse was brought up in Hampshire, located near a manor of Nicholas'. He was educated at Trinity College, Cambridge University, where he matriculated in 1569, and obtained his BA in 1573. Backhouse entered Gray's Inn in 1572.

== Merchant and country gentleman ==
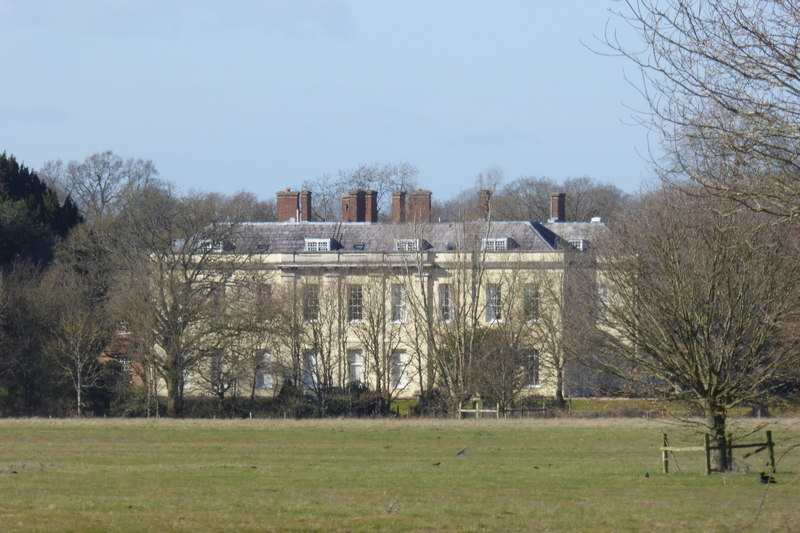
Swallowfield Park, the Backhouse family estate, which Samuel Backhouse purchased in 1581.

Backhouse's first large sum of property came upon his father's death in June 1580, when he inherited his father's Hampshire lands. The next came after Backhouse married Elizabeth, daughter of John Borlase of Little Marlow, on 6 September 1581. Ingratiated into the Buckinghamshire gentry, he proceeded to acquire the Berkshire manor of Swallowfield. The new house was not far from his new affinial relatives. Backhouse grew into "a man of considerable wealth" who, alongside his property in Swallowfield, held over 70 acres in Clerkenwell and Islington.

In Swallowfield, Backhouse abandoned the mercantile lifestyle of his father for that of a country gentleman. His brother Rowland took up the family's commercial helm. He did, however, make an investment of £240 into the East India Company in 1600, following his brother's example. Backhouse was not immediately at home in this new way of life. His university peer John Chamberlain reported wryly that in 1600-01 Backhouse, as the county's newly made sheriff, was "almost out of heart" after being informed Queen Elizabeth I was visiting. Backhouse felt himself "altogether unacquainted with courting", though he ultimately performed "very well".

In Berkshire, Backhouse occupied several municipal offices. He was justice of the peace in the county from 1593 until his death; sheriff of Berkshire, in 1600-01; commissioner of recusants in Berkshire, 1602; joint collector of aid in Berkshire, 1613; and commissioner of sewers in Buckinghamshire and Berkshire, 1622.

== Parliamentary career ==
=== Blessed Parliament: New Windsor, 1604–10 ===
Backhouse first sat in parliament in 1604, sitting for New Windsor alongside Thomas Durdent in the Blessed Parliament of James I. Parliamentary historians Alan Davidson and Andrew Thrush suggest he was emboldened to try for this position by his successes in the royal visit a few years earlier, and his many relatives in parliament, including brothers-in-law Sir William Borlase and Nicholas Fuller. His election may have also been influenced by the favour of Charles Howard, 1st Earl of Nottingham, who exercised a large influence over the borough, high steward of Windsor at the time. Durdent had been selected as per the tradition that a townsman would occupy the second seat, Durdent then being the under-steward.

In the opening session of this parliament, Backhouse was nominated to nine parliamentary committees. Several of these he attended with either, or both, of his brothers-in-law. These included: a committee (with Fuller) on 5 May 1604 concerning abuses of the Exchequer; a conference on 8 May with the House of Lords on purveyance, attended by all three; and a joint conference on 26 May concerning the feudal tax of wardship, also attended by all three.

The second session of parliament, held in early 1606, saw Backhouse nominated to ten committees. In January, he attended two committees regarding bills relevant to London, namely the city's housing and (with Myddleton) the contribution of the River Lea to the city's water supply. Late the same month, Backhouse joined his brothers-in-law in considering MP Robert Johnson's bill in opposition to the abuse of purveyance. Fuller certainly opposed the bill, but Backhouse's personal opinion went unrecorded. On 14 May, Backhouse was ordered, with several other members, to deliver the Commons' petition of grievances to James I, as he had been among those required to be present at joint conferences discussing supply and ecclesiastical grievances in February and April. Near the session's close, a group of five purveyors—Masters Grave and Brennan alongside their three servants—surreptitiously took wood from Backhouse's Berkshire estate early on a Sunday morning. They were brought before the Star Chamber the following month, who found this action in violation of Magna Carta and considered it a further affront as it occurred on the sabbath, "an offence muche increasinge th'offenders punishmte". All offenders were imprisoned, the masters fined, and the servants pilloried.

Backhouse's return to parliament in late 1606 was preceded by a case in the Court of Chancery, where he served as a co-defendant in a case prosecuted by Speaker Sir Edward Phelips in the name of Henry Campion. The third session of parliament begun, for Backhouse, with a joint conference concerning the Union of the Crowns on 24 November 1606. From November 1606 to June 1607, during this session of parliament, he was named to several committees concerning new bills: concerning the ecclesiastical courts; concerning legitimacy; (with Myddleton) the 1606 New River Act; assuring the lands of the City of London's livery companies; and, finally, on 13 June, enabling Berkshire gentleman William Essex to sell off his lands in order to repay his creditors. This final committee brought Backhouse into first recorded connection with family friend Sir Henry Neville. During this session, Backhouse and his brothers-in-law were also called on to assist in drafting a petition on religion.

The hiatus between the third and fourth session—prolonged by plague, financial troubles, and James's exasperation with Parliament—saw the death of Windsor's second member, Durdent. Durdent died in 1607, but he was not replaced until shortly before the fourth session, held in late 1610. Ultimately, on 1 February, Sir Francis Howard, a nephew of Nottingham and experienced seaman, took his place. The fourth session of parliament witnessed another collaboration between Backhouse and Neville as, on 16 February 1610, they were on the same committee to discuss the bill on the subject of William Essex; Backhouse was appointed to follow this bill up on 3 May, considering revisions made to it by the House of Lords. He was also named to examine the bill to repeal the 1606 and 1607 New River Acts; a "natural choice" for a bill opposed to purveyance, and in favour the preservation of timber, according to Davidson and Thrush. In total, this first parliament saw Backhouse nominated to fifty committees, despite the fact he made no recorded speeches.

=== Addled Parliament: Aylesbury, 1614 ===
In the following parliament, Backhouse sat for Aylesbury alongside Buckinghamshire gentleman Sir John Dormer of Dorton. This constituency was under the influence of the local favourite Sir John Pakington, who had entertained Elizabeth extravagantly in 1603; he presumably gave his approval to the election of these two candidates. Backhouse's kinsman Borlase had occupied this seat previous parliament. Additionally, Backhouse's patron in Windsor, Nottingham, had gone to sea; Sir Richard Lovelace, the town's high steward, took Backhouse's seat. This parliament, held between April and June 1614, came to be known as the Addled Parliament for its failure to enact any legislature or resolve the tension between king and Parliament. Just as his last parliament, Backhouse was named to nine committees but continued silence. On 8 April, Backhouse was among those commanded to pursue historical precedents as to the requirements to become an attorney-general. He was also named among those to discuss repealing various "obsolete, unprofitable and pernicious statutes"; assess bills to boost Sabbath observance; confirm the Charterhouse hospital; revoke an act on fish-packing from Elizabeth's reign; and prevent customs extortions. Backhouse neglected to attend the committee for the Charterhouse hospital bill.

Backhouse apparently did not seek re-election for James' next parliament in 1621, though Dormer sat again, on that occasion with Backhouse's nephew-in-law Henry Borlase. He was summoned by the Privy Council in 1622 for failing to pay the benevolence James had exacted after parliament dissolved, in lieu of the funds Parliament had failed to supply him.

== New River Company ==
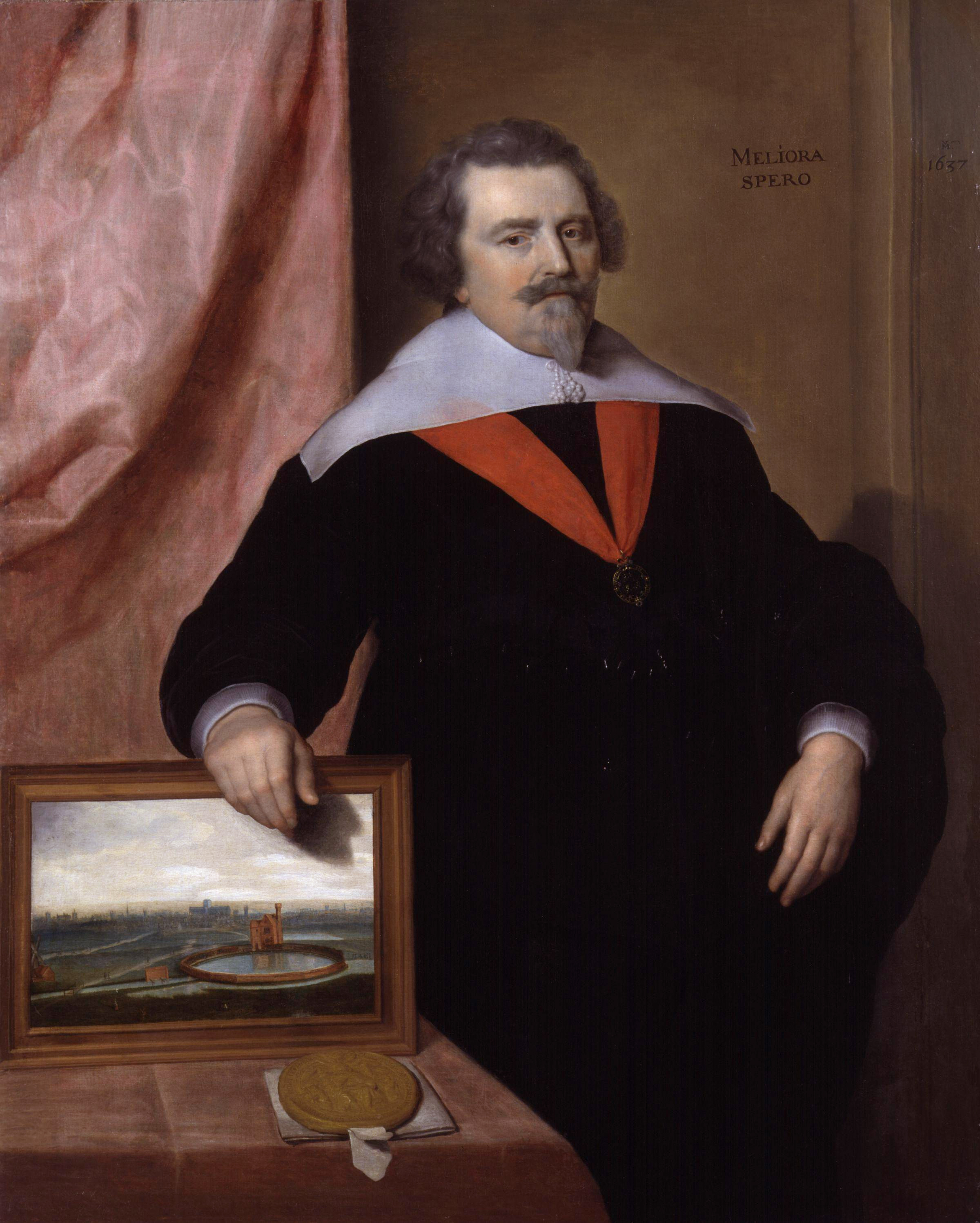
Samuel Backhouse's son, John, who accompanied Backhouse into the New River Company. Pictured in the left corner is the Company's first reservoir.

After Backhouse's parliamentary career had finished, he reentered commerce with the incorporation of the New River Company in 1619. Backhouse was among the "Adventurers" (shareholders) named in the incorporation charter, alongside his son John, several other kinsmen, and Sir Hugh Myddelton (with whom he had worked in parliament). Prior to this, in early 1614 and while attending parliament, Backhouse and three others investors had paid a small fee to acquire a portion of land in Ware, at the source of the New River. Around the same time, Backhouse had been paid a fee of £65 by Myddelton to use his property in Clerkenwell for the New River head.

== Family and personal life ==
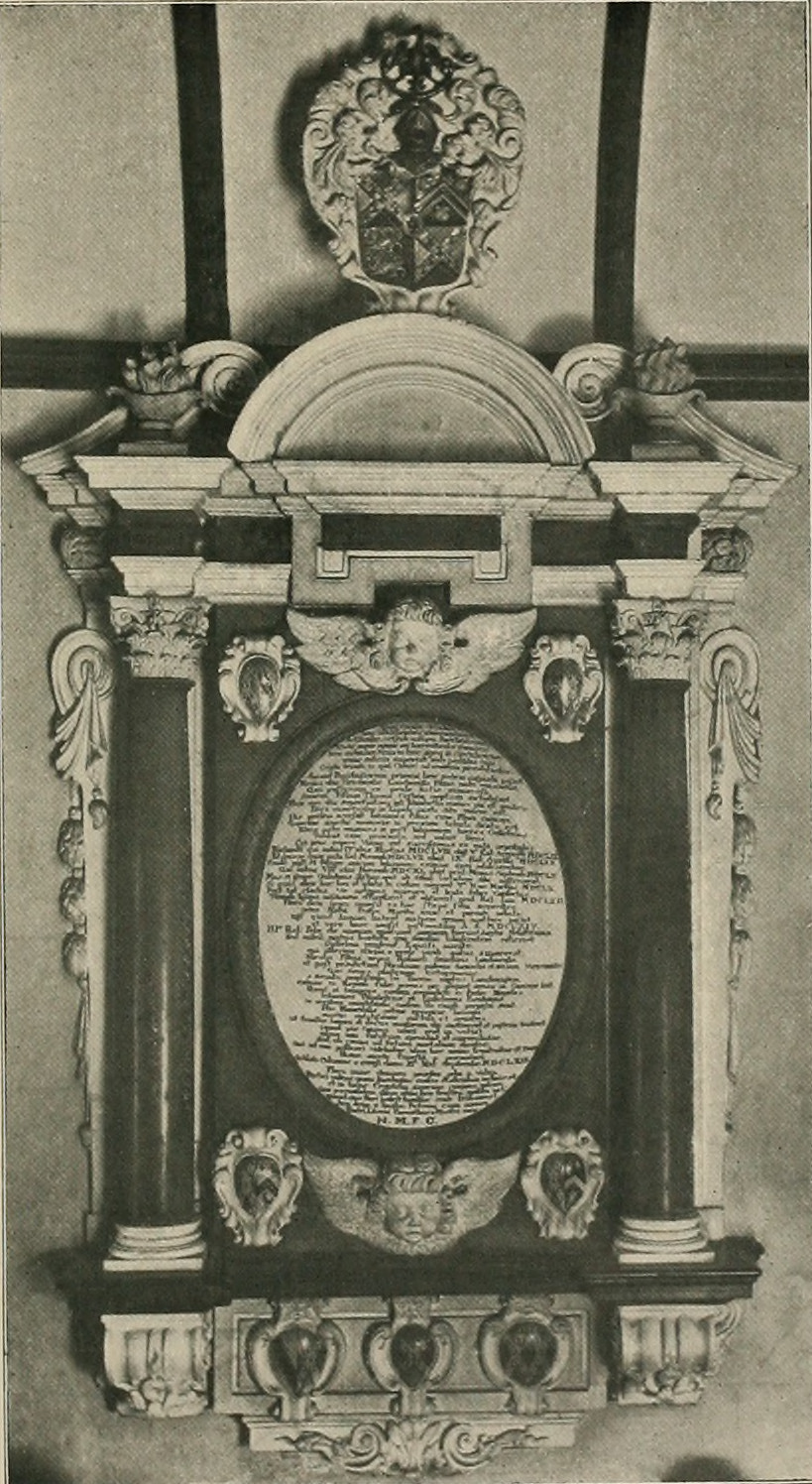
The Backhouse family monument in All Saints' parish church, Swallowfield. This monument was erected by Flower Backhouse, Samuel's granddaughter via William, in 1670, to the memory of all the Backhouses who had resided in Swallowfield.

Samuel and Elisabeth Backhouse had eight children, four sons and four daughters (one of whom predeceased him). The sons were born John (b. 1584), Nicholas, Samuel, and William (b. 1593). In the autumn of 1607, a visitor to Swallowfield reported Backhouse proposed a marriage between one of his sons and one of Henry Neville's daughters. This offer reportedly fell through, leaving Backhouse "not a little perplexed", though the rebuffed proposal apparently led to no enduring antipathy between the families, as Backhouse was made godfather to Neville's child the following year. In 1618, Backhouse and his family became involved in a quarrel over the ownership of some pews in Swallowfield church, which was ultimately brought in front of the Star Chamber. In the course of this dispute, Backhouse's son John attacked one John Phippes with a spear.

Backhouse drew up his will on 8 June 1626, "weak of body", and died shortly after, on 24 June 1626. He was buried at Swallowfield. The news of his death apparently did not travel as far as Whitehall as, in February 1627, he was named to the Berkshire commission for the Forced Loan there.

Samuel's eldest child, John, subsequently inherited his father's estates, including Swallowfield, and followed his father into parliament from 1625 to 1629, as the member for Great Marlow. John married in 1615, but died childless in 1649, passing Swallowfield to his youngest brother, William. Little is known of Samuel's middle sons, Nicholas and Samuel, who were both alive by 1628, when they are mentioned in their mother's will, but apparently both died unmarried before 1649, neglected in their elder brother's will. William was the only son of Samuel's to have progeny: two sons and a daughter, Flower. Both sons predeceased William, leaving Flower his sole heir upon his death in 1662. Despite three marriages, when Flower died in 1700, none of her children had survived her, ending Samuel Backhouse's direct line of descendance.

Samuel's son, William, became a "most renown'd chymist, Rosicrucian, and a great encourager of those that studied chymistry and astrology", as Anthony à Wood put it, later working as the tutor of Elias Ashmole. C. H. Josten, in a biographical sketch of William, hypothesises that William's ancestors were also interested in alchemy. To this end, he cites an Ashmolean manuscript which records Sir Edward Dyer enlisting the aid of Cornelius Drebbel and one "Sir S. Backus" in translating and deciphering an enigmatic "Dutch Cypher". If this "S. Backus" can be identified with Samuel Backhouse, this document puts him as an acquaintance of two prominent English mysticists, suggesting his own interests in that area.

== Sources ==
- Davidson, Alan (2010). "BACKHOUSE (BACCHUS, BACKHURST), John (1584-1649), of Sindlesham and Swallowfield, Berks. and Kingsley, Hants.". In Ferris, John P.; Thrush, Andrew (eds.). The House of Commons 1604–1629. The History of Parliament Trust.
- Davidson, Alan (2010). "New Windsor". In Ferris, John P.; Thrush, Andrew (eds.). The House of Commons 1604–1629. The History of Parliament Trust.
- Davidson, Alan; Thrush, Andrew (2010). "BACKHOUSE (BACCHUS, BAKEHOUSE), Samuel (1554-1626), of Swallowfield, Berks.". In Ferris, John P.; Thrush, Andrew (eds.). The House of Commons 1604–1629. The History of Parliament Trust.
- Hawarde, John (1894). Baildon, William Paley (ed.). Les reportes del cases in Camera Stellata, 1593 to 1609. London: Spottiswoode and Co. OCLC 1101247725.
- Josten, C. H. (1949). "William Backhouse of Swallowfield". Ambix. 4 (1–2): 1–33. doi:10.1179/amb.1949.4.1-2.1.
- Rudden, Bernard (1985). The New River: A Legal History. Oxford: Clarendon Press. ISBN 978-0-19-825497-3.
- Russell, Lady (1901). Swallowfield and its Owners. London/New York/Bombay: Longmans, Green and, Co. OCLC 928835337.
- Sgroi, Rosemary (2010). "Aylesbury". In Ferris, John P.; Thrush, Andrew (eds.). The House of Commons 1604–1629. The History of Parliament Trust.
- Thrush, Andrew (2010). "The Parliament of 1614". In Ferris, John P.; Thrush, Andrew (eds.). The House of Commons 1604–1629. The History of Parliament Trust.
- Wood, Anthony (1817). "William Backhouse". In Bliss, Philip (ed.). Athenae Oxonienses. Vol. 3. London. pp. 576–577. OCLC 847943279.

Parliament of England
Preceded by Julius Caesar; John Norreys	Member of Parliament for Windsor; 1604; With: Thomas Durdent	Succeeded by Richard Lovelace; Thomas Woodward
Preceded by William Borlase; William Smith	Member of Parliament for Aylesbury; 1614; With: John Dormer	Succeeded by John Dormer; Henry Borlase
