= Michael Soole =

British judge

The Honourable Mr Justice Soole
- Royal coat of arms of the United Kingdom

Judge of the High Court
- In office 26 November 2015 – 1 October 2026
- Monarchs: Elizabeth II, Charles III

Personal details
- Born: 18 July 1954 (age 72) United Kingdom
- Education: University College, Oxford

Sir Michael Alexander Soole (born 18 July 1954) is a British High Court judge.

Soole was educated at Berkhamsted School and took an MA from University College, Oxford. While at Oxford, he was president of the Oxford Union in 1974.

He was called to the bar at Inner Temple in 1977. In 1983 and 1987, he stood as the SDP candidate in Aylesbury, coming second both times.

He served as a recorder from 2000 to 2015 and took silk in 2002.

On 26 November 2015, he was appointed a judge of the High Court and assigned to the Queen's Bench Division. He took the customary knighthood in 2015. From January 2022, he serves as judge in charge of the King's Bench civil list.

In 2002, he married Catherine Gavine Marshall, with whom he has three step sons and two step daughters.

On 1 October 2026, Soole retired from the Judiciary.
