= Sir William Borlase's Grammar School =

Location
- West Street; Marlow, Buckinghamshire, SL7 2BR; England; 51°34′13″N 0°46′54″W

Information
- Type: Academy grammar school
- Motto: Latin: Te Digna Sequere (Follow things worthy of thyself)
- Established: 1624; 402 years ago
- Founder: William Borlase
- Specialist: Performing Arts College
- Department for Education URN: 136781 Tables
- Ofsted: Reports
- Head teacher: Ed Goodall
- Gender: Coeducational
- Age: 11 to 18
- Enrolment: 1,080
- Houses: Britons; Danes; Normans; Romans; Saxons; Vikings
- Publication: The Borlasian
- Website: www.swbgs.com

Sir William Borlase's Grammar School (commonly shortened to Borlase or SWBGS) is a selective state grammar school accepting girls and boys aged 11–18, in Marlow, Buckinghamshire, England. It is located on West Street, close to the town centre. It consists of approximately 1200 pupils, including a sixth form of about 450.

== History ==
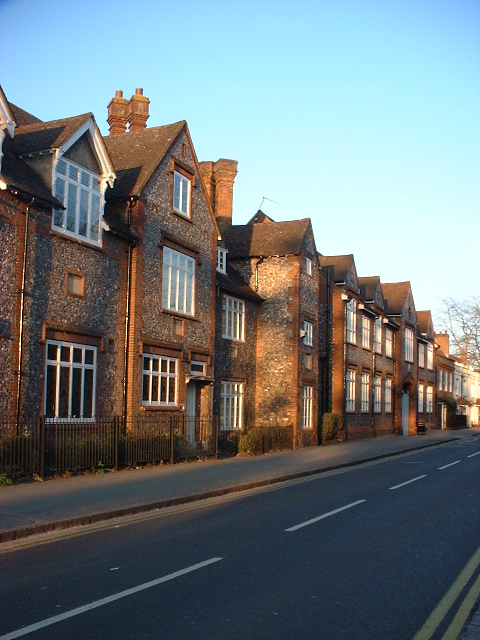
Front of the school

=== Foundation ===
The School was founded on its present site in 1624 by Sir William Borlase in memory of his son Henry Borlase, MP for Marlow, who died earlier that year.

=== Sir William Borlase ===
In 1624 and in memory of his son Henry who died that same year, Sir William Borlase decided to build a "free school" in the town in order "to teach twenty-four poor children to write, read and cast accounts, such as their parents and friends are not able to maintain at school". Boys entered the school between the ages of ten and fourteen and at the end of two years, six of the best were given two pounds each to apprentice themselves to a trade.

=== Co-education ===
In 1987 the school became co-educational when girls entered into the lower sixth.

=== Specialist status ===
In September 2005 the school was awarded specialist school status as a Performing Arts College, by the Department for Education and Skills (DfES).

=== Academy status ===
In June 2011 the school became an Academy.

== Inspections ==
A full Ofsted inspection occurred in May 2024. The report noted that "The school’s ethos is positive and joyful." Borlase was judged to be an 'Outstanding' school in all categories.

== Coat of arms ==
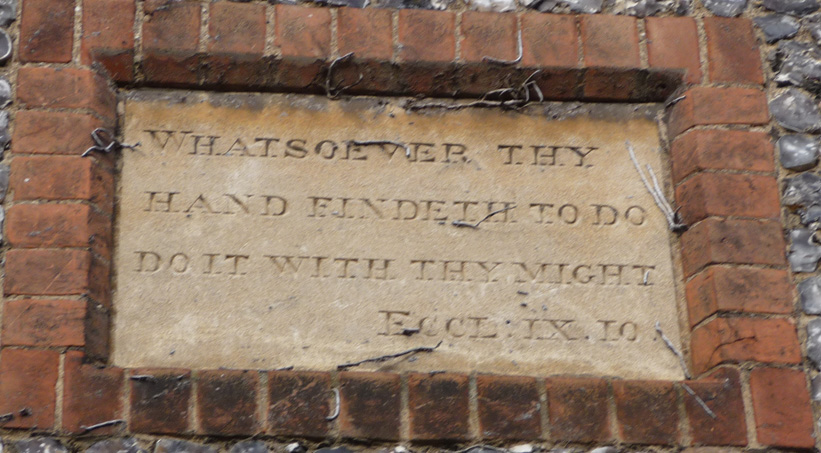
The external walls contain this plaque with a biblical quotation.

The school coat of arms is on all school literature and the school uniform. Originally, the Taillefers of Angoulême had a crest of a ghostly hand emerging from a cloud. It is holding a badelaire to give one power in a struggle, be it sporting or academic. Behind this, on the background, can be seen eight stars.

== Sport ==
The Sir William Borlase's Grammar School Boat Club has had members reaching international events.

The Borlase Hockey club had over 200 members in 2014. The club is based at Marlow Sports Club.

== Notable former pupils ==
- Richard Britnell – Professor of History at the University of Durham from 1997 to 2003
- Tony Culyer CBE – health economist, professor and deputy vice-chancellor at York (UK) and professor at University of Toronto
- Tom Dean MBE – swimmer, Olympic gold medalist at Tokyo 2020
- Tom Guest – Harlequins rugby union player
- Lieutenant B. A. Horsfall – recipient of the Victoria Cross
- Ken Snakehips Johnson – bandleader, jazz artist
- Philip Lee – Conservative MP for Bracknell 2010–2019
- Alfie May - English Professional football player, Charlton Athletic
- Hugh Walpole CBE - novelist
- Garry Weston CBE – inventor of Wagon Wheels snack food and chief executive of Associated British Foods from 1969 to 1999
- David Willey - longtime BBC Rome and Vatin Correspondent, who reported during the papacies of five Popes

== Notable staff ==
- Edward Henry Blakeney, classical scholar and poet, headteacher 1901-04
