= 1899 Aylesbury by-election =

UK parliamentary by-election

The 1899 Aylesbury by-election was a parliamentary by-election held for the UK House of Commons constituency of Aylesbury in Buckinghamshire on 6 January 1899.

== Vacancy ==
The vacancy was caused by the death of the sitting Liberal Unionist MP, Baron Fredinand von Rothschild at the family home which he had built, Waddesdon Manor, on 17 December 1898. Rothschild had held the Aylesbury seat since 1885, first as a Liberal but he later joined the Liberal Unionist exodus over Irish Home Rule and had sat as Liberal Unionist since 1886.

== Candidates ==
=== Liberal Unionists ===
At first it appeared that the by-election arising from Rothschild’s death would be contested, although neither the Unionists nor the Liberals had a candidate in the field. The Liberal Unionists were reported as considering asking the Hon. Lionel Walter Rothschild, the son of the late Lord Rothschild, to be their candidate. This proposal met with Rothschild’s approval and the Liberal Unionists held a meeting at Aylesbury Town Hall on the evening of Tuesday 3 January 1899 to formally decide the issue of their candidate. The meeting was chaired by Leopold de Rothschild, the cousin and brother-in-law of the late MP. The meeting was said to be large and was attended, amongst others, by Sir Fortescue Flannery MP and Coningsby Disraeli MP. The meeting agreed to endorse Walter Rothschild as their candidate. Rothschild accepted, announcing he was opposed to Home Rule and to the proposal of the Gladstonians to abolish the House of Lords. He also said he supported the many reforms of a social character put forward by Joseph Chamberlain before his break with the Liberal Party, which now formed an integral part of the Unionist programme.

=== Liberals ===
The local Liberals were initially said to be in favour of approaching George Russell who had formerly been MP for the Aylesbury constituency. Other Carpetbaggers were looking for a seat. The Aylesbury Liberal Association received an unsolicited telegram from a Mr. Mackay Green of George Street, Edinburgh saying he thought the seat could be won in the Radical interest and offering himself as candidate, so long as all expenses were paid. The Liberals had failed to contest the seat at the previous general election in 1895 and in the end they chose not to oppose Rothschild at the by-election.

== The result ==
There being no other nominations therefore, Rothschild was returned unopposed.

Aylesbury by-election, 1899
Party	Candidate	Votes	%	±%
Liberal Unionist	Hon. Lionel Walter Rothschild	Unopposed	N/A	N/A
Liberal Unionist hold				

== See also ==
- List of United Kingdom by-elections
- United Kingdom by-election records
