= Whelpley Hill =

Hamlet in Buckinghamshire, England

Coordinates: 51.728°N 0.556°W

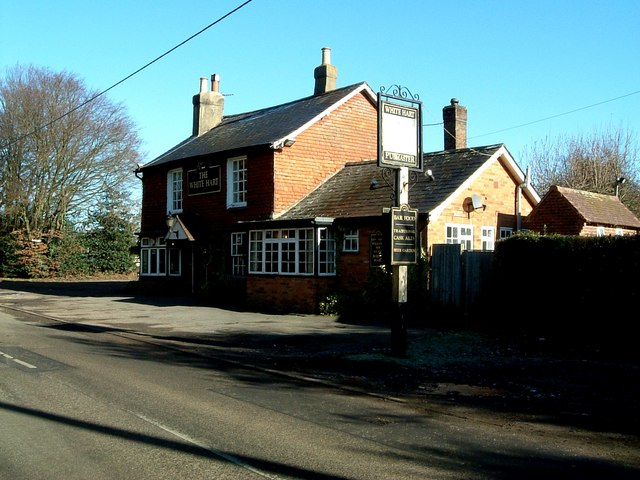
Pub "The White Hart"

Whelpley Hill is a hamlet in the parish of Ashley Green in Buckinghamshire, England. It is located to the east of Chesham, near the border with Hertfordshire and is the site of an Iron Age hillfort.

Whelpley Hill has a village hall and a public house called "The White Hart"". There was a Baptist Chapel which closed in 1948, and an Anglican church which the Parish of Great Chesham put up for sale in 2006.

Whelpley Hill was also known as Wolf Hill in the Middle Ages. Nearby Grove Farm was the subject of a 1986 book and television series entitled Seventy Summers, written by the landowner Tony Harman.
