= Stanley Reed (British politician) =

British newspaper editor and politician (1872–1969)

Sir Herbert Stanley Reed KBE (28 January 1872 – 17 January 1969) was an important figure in the media of India in the early 20th century who later became a Conservative Party politician in the UK. He was conservative member for the Aylesbury division of Buckinghamshire.

Reed was the longest serving Editor of The Times of India from 1907 until 1924. He received correspondence from the major figures of India such as Mahatma Gandhi. In all he lived in India for fifty years. He was respected in the United Kingdom as an expert on Indian current affairs. He christened Jaipur as 'the Pink City of India'.

Reed was returned as Conservative member of parliament (MP) for Aylesbury in a by-election in 1938. He was re-elected at the 1945 general election and stepped down at the 1950 general election, when aged 78. He served as chairman of the India and Burma Association.

He died in January 1969 aged 96.

== Personal ==
In 1901 he married Lilian Humphrey, the daughter of John Humphrey, CBE of Bombay and London.

== Publications ==
- Memoirs: The India I Knew, 1897-1947 (1952)
- The Times of India Directory and Year Book Including Who's Who. The Times of India. 1964.

Parliament of the United Kingdom
Preceded by Michael Beaumont	Member of Parliament for Aylesbury; 1938–1950	Succeeded by Spencer Summers
