= 1938 Aylesbury by-election =

1938 UK parliamentary by-election

Aylesbury

The 1938 Aylesbury by-election was a parliamentary by-election for the British House of Commons constituency of Aylesbury on 19 May 1938.

== Vacancy ==
The by-election was caused by the resignation of the sitting Conservative MP, Michael Beaumont on 2 May 1938. He had been MP here since winning the seat in 1929.

== Election history ==
Aylesbury had been won by the Conservatives at every election since 1918 apart from 1923 when the Liberal Thomas Keens won the seat. The result at the last General election was:

1935 general election
| Party | Candidate | Votes | % | ±% |
|---|---|---|---|---|
| Conservative | Michael Beaumont | 24,728 | 57.4 | |
| Liberal | Margaret Wintringham | 13,622 | 31.6 | |
| Labour | E W Shearer | 4,716 | 11.0 | |
| Majority | | 11,106 | 25.8 | |
| Turnout | | 43,066 | | |
| Conservative hold | | Swing | | |

== Candidates ==
The local Conservatives selected Sir Stanley Reed as candidate. He was a 66-year-old who had been a newspaper editor in India where he lived for 50 years. The Liberal candidate from the last General Election, Margaret Wintringham, was not available to stand as she had been selected as prospective Liberal candidate for Gainsborough. The local Liberal Association selected 64-year-old former Finchley MP, Atholl Robertson. He had represented Finchley from 1923–24 and had stood there last time but had since been replaced as candidate. On 24 April 1937 the local Labour Party had selected a new candidate in Reginald Groves, a Trotskyist.

== Main issues and campaign ==
The Liberal campaign sought to appeal to those who supported a Popular Front. Robertson had secured the support of the Communist Party, which had signed up fully to the Popular Front message. Robertson called for arms for Spain, defence of democratic liberties and the economic and social advance of the people.

The Labour candidate, Reginald Groves came under pressure to withdraw in favour of the Liberal candidate, when a group of local Labour Party supporters met and formed themselves into a 'Progressive Alliance' group. This group included 34-year-old Christopher Addison, son of the Labour Lord who had been a Liberal Cabinet Minister in Lloyd George's government. Other group members included author Ladbroke Black. The group Chairman was local JP, John Murphy. The meeting passed the following resolution; "We, the undersigned, deploring the international situation created by the National Government, have united without foregoing our individual political principles in forming a Progressive Alliance Group with the object of securing the registration of an effective anti-Government poll in the Mid-Bucks by-election, by supporting Mr. T Atholl Robertson." This was followed up by a statement which added "... we appeal to our fellows to work and vote for the Liberal candidate... We also very seriously suggest to the Labour candidate, Mr Reginald Groves, that the greatest service he could render to the cause of democracy and peace would be to withdraw from the contest and lend his support to the candidate who had incomparably the better chance of defeating the representative of the National Government. ... The only question before us is whether we approve or disapprove of the domestic and foreign policy now being pursued by Mr Chamberlain. ... We believe that if... the Liberal and Labour candidates agreed to sink their differences. ... Mid-Bucks could be added to the list of constituencies which in the past weeks have shown the government how deeply the nation resents its betrayal of both democracy and British interests in its pursuance of a non-intervention policy which ... amounts to intervention on behalf of the Italian and German invaders against the people of Spain." In addition, the neighbouring South-Bucks constituency had seen the local Liberal and Labour parties join together to form a South-Bucks Unity Committee. This group also called upon Groves to withdraw in favour of Robertson.

Groves retained the support of the Daily Herald newspaper which was a traditional supporter of the Labour Party and a majority of his own local executive. He was also still able to attract leading Labour politicians to speak on his campaign platform, such as Clement Attlee, Ellen Wilkinson and Harold Laski. Groves also won support from the Independent Labour Party.

On 12 May, David Lloyd George's Council of Action announced that it would play no part in the campaign because both Liberal and Labour candidates had given satisfactory answers to its questions. The replies Groves gave to them were clearly misleading and at odds with his own Trotskyist views. The Council was a strong supporter of action from the League of Nations yet in his manifesto Groves declared "a successful League of Nations is not possible until the people are able to express and enforce effectively their will to peace".

== Result ==
Aylesbury by-election, 1938
| Party | Candidate | Votes | % | ±% |
|---|---|---|---|---|
| Conservative | Stanley Reed | 21,695 | 54.1 | −1.3 |
| Liberal | Thomas Atholl Robertson | 10,751 | 26.8 | −4.8 |
| Labour | Reginald Groves | 7,666 | 19.1 | +8.2 |
| Majority | | 10,944 | 27.3 | +1.5 |
| Turnout | | 40,112 | 63.1 | −7.1 |
| Conservative hold | | Swing | | |

Groves, the defeated Labour candidate claimed after the result that "we have delivered the death-blow to Liberalism in this division." The Communist Party supporting Daily Worker criticised Groves "divisive Trotskyist splitting tactics".

== Aftermath ==
The result at the following General election;

1945 general election
| Party | Candidate | Votes | % | ±% |
|---|---|---|---|---|
| Conservative | Stanley Reed | 24,537 | 47.8 | −5.3 |
| Labour | Reginald Groves | 16,445 | 32.1 | +13.1 |
| Liberal | Guy Naylor | 10,302 | 20.1 | −6.7 |
| Majority | | 8,092 | 15.7 | |
| Turnout | | 51,284 | 69.5 | +6.4 |
| Conservative hold | | Swing | | |

== See also ==
- List of United Kingdom by-elections
- United Kingdom by-election records
