= Henry Borlase =

English politician

Henry Borlase (ca. 1590 – ca. 1624) was an English politician of the Borlase Family who sat in the House of Commons between 1621 and 1624.

Borlase was the son of William Borlase of Marlow and Bockmore Buckinghamshire. He matriculated at Magdalen College, Oxford, on 22 June 1604, aged 13. He was a student of the Middle Temple in 1607. In 1621, he was elected Member of Parliament for Aylesbury. In 1624 he was elected MP for Marlow until his death. His father founded Sir William Borlase's Grammar School in his memory.

Parliament of England
Preceded by Sir John Dormer; Samuel Backhouse	Member of Parliament for Aylesbury; 1621; With: Sir John Dormer	Succeeded by Sir John Pakington, Bt. Sir Thomas Crewe
New constituency	Member of Parliament for Marlow; 1624; With: Thomas Cotton	Succeeded by Thomas Cotton; John Backhouse
