= Thomas Scot =

English politician, executed as one of the regicides of King Charles I

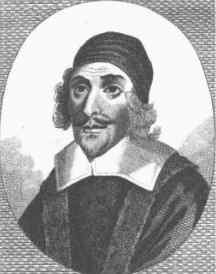
Thomas Scot

Thomas Scot (or Scott; died 17 October 1660) was an English politician who sat in the House of Commons at various times between 1645 and 1660. He was one of the men who signed the death warrant of Charles I and was executed as one of the king's regicides.

== Early life ==
It is claimed that Scot was educated at Westminster School and attended Cambridge University. However, there is no clear evidence for his attendance or graduation at either. In 1626, he married Alice Allinson of Chesterford in Essex. He was a lawyer in Buckinghamshire and grew to prominence as the treasurer of the region's County Committee between 1644 and 1646. He became influential enough to dominate the Committee and was elected Member of Parliament for Aylesbury in 1645 as a recruiter to the Long Parliament. Though he had a penchant for long, passionate speeches in Parliament, Scot could also be a subtle backroom politician and had a knack for creating alliances and rallying votes. A royalist acerbically described him as one who "crept into the House of Commons, whispers Treason into many of the Members ears, animating the War, and ripping up and studying aggravations thereunto."

== Political career ==
Scot's beliefs about government by consent prior to Pride's Purge are hard to gauge, though from what has survived of his writings and speeches many historians have described him as being republican. His actions during the Purge period definitely indicate that he developed strong republican leanings before 1648.

From the beginning of the English Civil War, Scot was a strong supporter of tough terms with King Charles I and later became a vociferous opponent of the Treaty of Newport, declaring "that there could be no time seasonable for such a treaty, or for a peace with so perfidious and implacable a prince; but it would always be too soon, or too late. He that draws his sword upon the king, must throw his scabbard into the fire; and that all peace with him would prove the spoil of the godly."

After Pride's Purge, Scot became one of the chief organizers of the trial and execution of the King. Scot was instrumental in the erection of the Republic and along with Henry Vane, Oliver Cromwell and Arthur Heselrige became one of its primary leaders.

== Trial and execution ==
In 1653, with the fall of the Republic, Scot became one of the Protectorate's most vocal opponents, organising anti-Cromwell opposition inside the Parliament. In 1654, he was elected MP for Wycombe in the First Protectorate Parliament. He was elected MP for Aylesbury again in 1656 for the Second Protectorate Parliament. In 1659, he was elected MP for Wycombe again in the Third Protectorate Parliament and then sat for Aylesbury again in the restored Rump Parliament.

Like all of the other 59 men who signed the death warrant for Charles I, he was in grave danger when Charles II of England was restored to the throne. He fled to Flanders, but surrendered at Brussels. He was put on trial, found guilty and hanged, drawn and quartered on 17 October 1660 for the crime of regicide.

Thomas Scot was brought to trial on 12 October 1660 (in the opinion of Edmund Ludlow the outcome was a foregone conclusion). He was charged with sitting in the High Court of Justice at the trial of King Charles I and with signing one warrant for summoning that court, and another for the execution. He was further accused of wanting "Here lies Thomas Scot, who adjudged the late King to die" on his gravestone.

Many witnesses were produced to prove these things; and among them William Lenthal, Speaker in the Long Parliament, who, when the King entered the House of Commons in 1641, and had demanded of him the Five Members, had answered "that he had neither ears to hear, eyes to see, or mouth to speak except what the House gave", now appear for the prosecution; affirming in Court, that Scot, had justified proceeding against the Charles in the House of Commons.

In his defence, Scot said that whatever had been spoken in the House ought not to be given in evidence against him, not falling under the cognisance of any inferior court, as all men knew: that for what he had done in relation to the King, he had the authority of the Long Parliament for his justification and that this Court had no right to declare whether that authority were a Parliament or not; and being demanded to produce one instance to show that the House of Commons was ever possessed of such an authority, he assured them he could produce many. However, having begun with the Saxon times, he was interrupted by the Court, and told that the things of those ages were obscure.

Scot then moved on to a second defence, that

he could not see for what reason it was not as lawful for that House of Commons in which he had sat as a member, to make laws, as for the present Convention which had been called by the authority of the Keepers of the Liberties of England. I had the authority of Parliament, the legislative authority to justify me —

He was interrupted by the Court in mid-sentence; and John Finch said (with passion, according to Ludlow):

Sir, if you speak to this purpose again, I profess for my part I dare not hear any more: 'tis a doctrine so poisonous and blasphemous, that if you proceed upon this point, I shall (and I hope my lords will be the same opinion) desire that the jury may be immediately directed.

Scot replied:

My Lord, I thought you would rather have been my council, as I think 'tis the duty of your place. But in this matter I am not alone, neither is it myh single opinion: even the Secluded Members owned us to be a Parliament, else why did they, support by an armed force, intrude themselves contrary to the resolutions of the House, in order to procure the major vote for our dissolution (Ref. Long Parliament)?'

To which Francis Annesley answered that

if the Secluded Members had not appeared in Parliament, and by that means put an end to all pretenses, the people had not so soon arrived at their happiness.

These, with many other things of equal force were presented by Scot in his defence, not so much in the expectation that the jury would find him innocent, but to justify his actions to the country and posterity. As all expected, the jury was directed to find him guilty.

At his execution, some of his last words were: "I say again; to the Praise of the Free Grace of God; I bless His name He hath engaged me in a Cause, not to be Repented of, I say, Not to be Repented of."

== See also ==
- List of regicides of Charles I

== Notes ==
Parliament of England
Preceded by Ralph Verney; Sir John Pakington, Bt	Member for Aylesbury; 1645–1654; With: Simon Mayne	Succeeded by Henry Philips
Preceded by Thomas Lane; Sir Richard Browne, 1st Bt	Member for Wycombe; 1654–1656	Succeeded by Tobias Bridge
Preceded by Henry Philips	Member for Aylesbury; 1656–1659	Succeeded by Sir James Whitelocke; Thomas Tyrrill
Preceded by Tobias Bridge	Member for Wycombe; 1659–1660	Vacant Not represented in the restored Rump Title next held by Edmund Betty; Sir Richard Browne, 2nd Bt
