= Edward Henry Blakeney =

English classical scholar and poet

- Born: August 15, 1869; Mitcham, England
- Died: August 1955; Winchester, England
- Education: Westminster School, Trinity College, Cambridge
- Occupations: Classical scholar, poet
- Notable work: The Exile's Return, Driftwood

Edward Henry Blakeney (15 August 1869 – August 1955) was an English classical scholar and poet, born in Mitcham. He died in his home town of Winchester.

== Life ==
Edward Henry Blakeney was the son of William Blakeney of Westward Ho!, a Paymaster-in-Chief in the Navy. He was educated at Westminster School and Trinity College, Cambridge, graduating B.A. in 1891 and M.A. in 1895. From 1895 to 1901 he was headmaster of Sir Roger Manwood's School in Sandwich, from 1901 to 1904 headmaster of Sir William Borlase's Grammar School in Marlow, and from 1904 to 1918 headmaster of King's Ely. He was an Assistant Master at Winchester College from 1918 to 1930, and a lecturer in English Literature at Southampton University from 1929 to 1931.

Blakeney married and had children. As well as several volumes of poetry, he published editions and translations of classical Latin and Greek texts – including the histories of Herodotus and Tacitus – as well as editions of works by Milton.

== Works ==
Poetry

- The Exile's Return, and other poems, Cambridge : J. Palmer, 1890
- Driftwood, or, Wayside musings in verse, Ramsgate: Sutton and Goodchild, 1893
- Voices after sunset : and other poems, 1897
- 'Twixt the Gold Hour and the Grey, 1903

Other

- (ed.) Letters from A.E. Housman to E.H. Blakeney, Winchester: Printed at Mr. Blakeney's Private Press, 1941
