= Tony Harman =

English farmer and writer

Anthony Shannon Harman (6 March 1912 – 8 May 1999) was an English farmer and writer who was best known for a 1986 book about his life and the history of his farm entitled Seventy Summers. It was a number one bestseller in the United Kingdom and was made into a 1986 BBC Two television series which he presented.

Harman was born near Chesham in Buckinghamshire and he attended Harrow School and Trinity College, Cambridge, where he studied agriculture. In 1931, he started farming Grove Farm near Whelpley Hill. He became a published author late in life with an article in The Guardian. In Seventy Summers he advocated modern farming methods and contrasted them with the methods in place when he took over the farm which had barely changed in 150 years.

He followed up with The Charolais Adventure 1959–1989 (1990) about the introduction of the French Charolais cattle breed and A Thousand Years on a Chiltern Farm: The Story of Grove Farm, Chesham, Buckinghamshire (1999). He also wrote a Guardian column, served as a magistrate, and was a Labour Party parliamentary candidate for Aylesbury at the 1950, 1951, 1955 general elections. He died aged 87 in 1999.
