= Michael Beaumont (British politician) =

British soldier and politician (1903–1958)

Major Michael Wentworth Beaumont TD DL JP

Member of Parliament for Aylesbury
- In office 1929–1938
- Preceded by: Sir Alan Hughes Burgoyne
- Succeeded by: Stanley Reed

Personal details
- Born: 8 February 1903
- Died: 19 December 1958 (aged 55)
- Party: Conservative
- Spouse(s): Faith Pease (m. 1924) Doreen Christian Davis-Goff (m. 1935)
- Children: Timothy Beaumont
- Parents: Hubert George Beaumont (father); Elisa Mercedes Grace (mother)
- Relatives: 1st Baron Allendale (paternal grandfather); Michael P. Grace (maternal grandfather); 1st Baron Gainford (father-in-law)
- Education: Eton College; Oundle School
- Alma mater: Royal Military College, Sandhurst
- Military career
- Allegiance: United Kingdom
- Branch: British Army
- Service years: 1924–1940
- Rank: Major
- Service number: 23868
- Units: Coldstream Guards; Buckinghamshire and Berkshire Yeomanry; Royal Artillery
- Awards: Efficiency Decoration

Michael Wentworth Beaumont TD DL JP (8 February 1903 – 19 December 1958) was a British soldier and Conservative Party politician.

== Early life ==
Beaumont was born 8 February 1903 to Hon. Hubert George Beaumont and Elisa Mercedes Grace. He was the maternal grandson of Michael P. Grace and paternal grandson of the 1st Baron Allendale. He was educated at Eton College, Berkshire and Oundle School, Northamptonshire.

== Military career ==
Beaumont was further educated for a career in the army at the Royal Military College, Sandhurst, in Berkshire. He served in the Coldstream Guards as a second lieutenant, but resigned his commission on 29 October 1924. On 29 October 1926, he was promoted to lieutenant while in the Coldstream Guards reserve of officers.

He served in the 90th Field Brigade, Buckinghamshire and Berkshire Yeomanry, Royal Artillery, a part-time unit, and was promoted to major on 4 July 1939. He relinquished his commission because of ill health on 13 January 1940.

Beaumont was awarded the Efficiency Decoration on 19 August 1943. As a holder of the Territorial Decoration, he could use the post-nominal letters 'TD'.

== Political career ==
From 1927 to 1947, he was Justice of Peace for Buckinghamshire. He was elected as Member of Parliament (MP) for Aylesbury at the 1929 general election, and held the seat in the 1935 general election until he resigned from the House of Commons on 2 May 1938. In 1931 and 1932, Beaumont was Parliamentary Private Secretary to the Parliamentary Secretary to the Board of Education. He was appointed deputy lieutenant of Buckinghamshire in 1938.

== Private life ==
Beaumont married twice, firstly to Faith Pease, daughter of the 1st Baron Gainford on 29 February 1924 and secondly to Doreen Christian Davis-Goff, daughter of Sir Herbert Davis-Goff, 2nd Baronet on 30 December 1935. He had one son, Timothy Beaumont, by his first wife.

In 1928 he purchased Dorton House, Buckinghamshire from the Aubrey Fletcher estate and remained its owner until 1939 when it was sold to the Royal London School for the Blind. From 1948 he lived in Brannockstown.

He was Master of Foxhounds of Bicester and Warden Hill Hunt between 1945 and 1947, and of Kildare between 1953 and 1958. He also owned several racehorses.

He died at Harristown House, Brannockstown, Co. Kildare where he was found dead in his bed a day after attending a meeting of the hunt.

Parliament of the United Kingdom
Preceded by Sir Alan Hughes Burgoyne	Member of Parliament for Aylesbury; 1929–1938	Succeeded by Stanley Reed
