= George Burden =

English politician

George Burden (died 1593) of Westminster, was an English politician.

== Family and education ==
Burden was educated at Magdalen Hall, Oxford and Trinity College, Cambridge. He was a fellow of Trinity in 1546, and graduated with a BA c. 1548. He married Elizabeth Prestwood.

== Career ==
He was a member (MP) of the parliament of England for Aylesbury in 1572.
