= Aylesbury (constituency) =

Parliamentary constituency in the United Kingdom, 1801 onwards

Coordinates: 51.816°N 0.817°W

- County constituency for the House of Commons
- Boundaries since
- Boundary of Aylesbury in South East England
- County: Buckinghamshire
- Population: 108,027 (2011 census)
- Electorate: 75,636 (2023)
- Major settlements: Aylesbury, Aston Clinton, Wing

Current constituency
- Created: 1885
- Member of Parliament: Laura Kyrke-Smith (Labour)
- Seats: One

1553–1885
- Seats: Two
- Type of constituency: Borough constituency

Aylesbury is a constituency in the House of Commons of the UK Parliament, (Note: This is currently still a county constituency, so-called for the purposes of election expenses and type of returning officer. Elections are held at least every five years.) currently represented by Laura Kyrke-Smith, a member of the Labour Party.

== Constituency profile ==
The constituency is located in Buckinghamshire. It contains the large town of Aylesbury, Buckinghamshire's county town, and the rural areas to its east. Other settlements in the constituency include the villages of Aston Clinton, Pitstone and Wing.

Aylesbury has a history as a commercial and market town and expanded significantly after World War II. Residents of the constituency are generally wealthier than local and national averages, and the unemployment rate is low. The ethnic makeup of the constituency is similar to the country as a whole. At the most recent county council election in 2025, voters in Aylesbury elected primarily Liberal Democrat councillors, whilst seats in the rural areas of the constituency were mostly won by Conservatives. In the 2016 referendum on leaving the European Union, voters in the constituency are estimated to have voted slightly in favour of Brexit, similar to the national average.

== History ==
=== Early form ===
The Parliamentary Borough of Aylesbury sent two MPs to the House of Commons of England from 1553 to 1707, then to the House of Commons of Great Britain from 1707 to 1800 and finally to the House of Commons of the United Kingdom from 1801.

The seat was a much narrower, generally urban borough with two-member status at Westminster from its grant of a limited franchise in 1553 until the passing of the Great Reform Act 1832.

Parliamentary Elections, Aylesbury Act 1804
- Act of Parliament
- Parliament of the United Kingdom
- Long title: An Act for the preventing of Bribery and Corruption in the Election of Members to serve in Parliament for the Borough of Aylesbury in the County of Buckingham.
- Citation: 44 Geo. 3. c. 60
- Territorial extent: United Kingdom

Dates
- Royal assent: 29 June 1804
- Commencement: 29 June 1804 (Note: The Acts of Parliament (Commencement) Act 1793.)
- Repealed: 18 July 1872
Other legislation
Repealed by	Ballot Act 1872

Status: Repealed

Text of statute as originally enacted

In 1804, following the voiding of the election of the sitting MP, Robert Bent, for corruption, the franchise was extended by the Parliamentary Elections, Aylesbury Act 1804 (44 Geo. 3. c. 60) to the forty-shilling freeholders of the Three Hundreds of Aylesbury (Aylesbury, Risborough, and Stone). Subsequently, the contents of the Parliamentary Borough were defined within the 1832 Reform Act itself as the Three Hundreds of Aylesbury. This extended the seat to include Wendover and Princes Risborough.

The borough continued to elect two MPs until its abolition by the Redistribution of Seats Act 1885 and transformation into a large county division, formally named the Mid or Aylesbury Division of Buckinghamshire. It was one of three divisions formed from the undivided three-member Parliamentary County of Buckinghamshire, the other two being the Northern or Buckingham Division and the Southern or Wycombe Division. As well as the areas previously represented by the abolished Borough, the reconstituted seat included Linslade to the north-east and Chesham to the south-east. Since then national boundary reviews have seen a gradual reduction in its physical size as its population has grown (see Boundaries Section below).

=== Political history ===
The Conservative Party had held the seat from 1924 to 2024, and held it at the 2015 general election with a 50.7% share of the vote. The result made the seat the 133rd safest of the Conservative Party's 331 seats by percentage of majority. The closest result since 1929 but prior to 2024 was in 1966 when the Labour Party candidate fell 7.4% short of a majority. Labour gained the seat for the first time in its history in 2024, on a swing of over 15%.

In June 2016, an estimated 51.8% of local adults voting in the EU membership referendum chose to leave the European Union instead of to remain. This was matched in two January 2018 votes in Parliament by its MP.

=== Frontbenchers ===
David Lidington, the constituency's MP from 1992 until 2019, was the Secretary of State for Justice in Theresa May's cabinet since succeeding Liz Truss in the 2017 cabinet reshuffle, before becoming the effective First Secretary of State in the place of Damian Green in 2018's new year's reshuffle. During the premiership of David Cameron he served as Minister for Europe, campaigning unsuccessfully (in the constituency as well as the whole country) to remain in the EU. From 2007 to 2010 he had been his party's Shadow Secretary of State for Northern Ireland.

=== MPs who have received honours ===
Stanley Reed edited The Times of India from 1907 until 1924 and received correspondence from the major figures of India such as Mahatma Gandhi. In all he lived in India for fifty years. He was respected in the United Kingdom as an expert on Indian current affairs. He devised the sobriquet for Jaipur, 'the Pink City of India'.

== Boundaries and boundary changes ==
=== 1885–1918 ===
- The Sessional Divisions of Aylesbury, Chesham, and Linslade; and
- Parts of the second Sessional Division of Desborough and the Sessional Division of Winslow.

Aylesbury in Buckinghamshire, 1918–1945

=== 1918–1945 ===
- The Borough of Aylesbury;
- The Urban Districts of Beaconsfield and Chesham;
- The Rural District of Amersham;
- The part of the Rural District of Aylesbury not included in the Buckingham Division;
- The Rural District of Long Crendon parish of Towersey; and
- The Rural District of Wycombe parishes of Bledlow, Bradenham, Ellesborough, Great and Little Hampden, Great and Little Kimble, Horsenden, Hughenden, Ilmer, Monks Risborough, Princes Risborough, Radnage, Saunderton, and Wendover.

Linslade and Wing were transferred to the Buckingham Division and Amersham and Beaconsfield were transferred from the Wycombe Division.

=== 1945–1950 ===
The House of Commons (Redistribution of Seats) Act 1944 set up Boundaries Commissions to carry out periodic reviews of the distribution of parliamentary constituencies. It also authorised an initial review to subdivide abnormally large constituencies in time for the 1945 election. This was implemented by the Redistribution of Seats Order 1945 under which Buckinghamshire was allocated an additional seat. As a consequence, the parts of the (revised) Rural District of Wycombe in the Aylesbury Division, including Hughenden and Princes Risborough (but not Wendover which had been moved from the Rural District of Wycombe to that of Aylesbury by the reorganisation of local authorities in Buckinghamshire), were transferred to Wycombe.

There were no further changes and the revised composition of the constituency, after taking account of changes to local authorities, was:

- The Borough of Aylesbury;
- The Urban Districts of Beaconsfield and Chesham;
- The Rural District of Amersham;
- Parts of the Rural Districts of Aylesbury and Wing; and
- The part of the Rural District of Bullingdon in Buckinghamshire.

=== 1950–1974 ===
- The Borough of Aylesbury;
- The Urban District of Chesham;
- The Rural District of Aylesbury; and
- The Rural District of Amersham parishes of Ashley Green, Chartridge, Cholesbury-cum-St Leonards, Great Missenden, Latimer, Lee, and Little Missenden.

Beaconsfield and southern parts of the Rural District of Amersham (including Amersham itself) were transferred to the new constituency of South Buckinghamshire. The boundary with Buckingham was redrawn to align with the northern boundary of the Rural District of Aylesbury.

=== 1974–1983 ===
- The Borough of Aylesbury;
- The Rural District of Aylesbury; and
- The Rural District of Wycombe parishes of Bledlow-cum-Saunderton, Bradenham, Ellesborough, Great and Little Hampden, Great and Little Kimble, Ibstone, Lacey Green, Longwick-cum-Ilmer, Princes Risborough, Radnage, and Stokenchurch.

Parts of the Rural District of Wycombe, including Princes Risborough (but excluding Hughenden), transferred back from Wycombe. Chesham and the northern part of the Rural District of Amersham included in the new constituency of Chesham and Amersham.

=== 1983–1997 ===
- The District of Aylesbury Vale wards of Aston Clinton, Aylesbury Central, Bedgrove, Elmhurst, Gatehouse, Grange, Mandeville, Meadowcroft, Oakfield, Southcourt, Wendover, and Weston Turville;
- The District of Chiltern wards of Ballinger and South Heath, Great Missenden, and Prestwood and Heath End; and
- The District of Wycombe wards of Bledlow-cum-Saunderton, Icknield, Lacey Green and Hampden, Naphill-cum-Bradenham, Princes Risborough, and Stokenchurch.

Great Missenden transferred from Chesham and Amersham. Rural areas to the north and west of the town of Aylesbury transferred to Buckingham.

=== 1997–2010 ===
- The District of Aylesbury Vale wards of Aylesbury Central, Bedgrove, Elmhurst, Gatehouse, Grange, Mandeville, Meadowcroft, Oakfield, Southcourt, Wendover, and Weston Turville;
- The District of Chiltern wards of Ballinger and South Heath, Great Missenden, and Prestwood and Heath End; and
- The District of Wycombe wards of Bledlow-cum-Saunderton, Icknield, Lacey Green and Hampden, Naphill-cum-Bradenham, Princes Risborough, and Stokenchurch.

Minor changes, including the transfer of the District of Aylesbury Vale ward of Aston Clinton to Buckingham.

=== 2010–2024 ===
Map of boundaries 2010–2024

- The District of Aylesbury Vale wards of Aston Clinton, Aylesbury Central, Bedgrove, Coldharbour, Elmhurst and Watermead, Gatehouse, Mandeville and Elm Farm, Oakfield, Quarrendon, Southcourt, Walton Court and Hawkslade, and Wendover; and
- The District of Wycombe wards of Bledlow and Bradenham, Greater Hughenden, Lacey Green, Speen and the Hampdens, Stokenchurch, and Radnage.

Hughenden transferred from Wycombe. Princes Risborough transferred to Buckingham, offset by return of Aston Clinton. Great Missenden returned to Chesham and Amersham.

In April 2020, the Districts of Aylesbury Vale and Wycombe, as well as those of South Bucks and Chiltern were merged into the new unitary authority of Buckinghamshire Council. Accordingly, the contents of the constituency were:

- The Buckinghamshire Council wards of Aston Clinton and Bierton (part), Aylesbury East, Aylesbury North, Aylesbury North West, Aylesbury South East, Aylesbury South West, Aylesbury West, Ridgeway East (part), Ridgeway West, Stone and Waddesdon (part), Wendover, Hatton & Stoke Mandeville, West Wycombe (part), and Wing (part).

The constituency is based on the large town of Aylesbury and its suburbs as well as a small swathe of villages broken up by woods and cultivated land in the centre of the Chilterns which cover most of Buckinghamshire and parts of three other counties.

=== 2024–present ===
Further to the 2023 periodic review of Westminster constituencies which became effective for the 2024 general election the constituency is composed of the following:

- The District of Buckinghamshire wards of: Aston Clinton & Weston Turville; Aylesbury East; Aylesbury North; Aylesbury North West; Aylesbury South East (part); Aylesbury South West; Aylesbury West; Berryfields, Buckingham Park & Watermead (part); Bierton, Kingsbrook & Wing; Ivinghoe; Quainton.

The constituency was subject to significant changes, with southern, largely rural parts, including the town of Wendover, being included in the newly created seat of Mid Buckinghamshire. To partly compensate, the boundaries were extended northwards to include the communities of Ivinghoe and Wing, together with surrounding rural areas, previously part of the abolished Buckingham constituency.

== Members of Parliament ==
MPs 1553–1659 — MPs 1659–1885 — MPs 1885–1982 — Elections

=== MPs 1553–1659 ===
- Constituency created (1553)

Year	First member	Second member
1554 (Apr)	Thomas Smith	Humphrey Moseley
1554 (Nov)	William Rice	John Walwyn
1555	William Rice	Anthony Restwold
1558	Names lost	
1559	Arthur Porter	Thomas Crawley
1563	Thomas Sackville	Thomas Coleshill
1571	Thomas Lichfield	Edmund Docwra
1572	Thomas Lichfield	George Burden
1584	Thomas Tasburgh	John Smith
1586	Thomas Tasburgh	Thomas Scott
1589	Thomas Pigott	Henry Fleetwood
1593	Sir Thomas West	John Lyly
1597	Thomas Tasburgh	Thomas Smythe
1601	John Lyly	Richard More
1604	Sir William Borlase	Sir William Smith
1614	Sir John Dormer	Samuel Backhouse
1621	Sir John Dormer	Henry Borlase
1624	Sir John Pakington, Bt	Sir Thomas Crewe
1625	Sir Robert Carr	Sir Thomas Crewe
May 1625	Sir Robert Carr	Sir John Hare
1626	Clement Coke	Arthur Goodwin
1628	Clement Coke	Sir Edmund Verney
April 1640	Sir John Pakington, Bt	Ralph Verney
1640	Thomas Fountaine	Ralph Verney
November 1640	Sir John Pakington, Bt	Ralph Verney
1645	Thomas Scot	Simon Mayne

- Returned one member to the First and Second Protectorate Parliaments

Year	Member
1654	Henry Philips
1656	Thomas Scot

- Returned two members to the Third Protectorate Parliament and thereafter

Back to Members of Parliament

=== MPs 1659–1885 ===
Year	First member	First party	Second member	Second party
1659	James Whitelocke		Thomas Tyrrill	
1660	Sir Thomas Lee, 1st Bt.		Sir Richard Ingoldsby	
1685	Sir William Egerton		Richard Anderson	
1689	Sir Thomas Lee, 2nd Bt.		Richard Beke	
1690	Sir Thomas Lee, 2nd Bt.		Sir Thomas Lee, 1st Bt	
1691	Sir Thomas Lee, 2nd Bt.		Simon Mayne	
1695	Sir Thomas Lee, 2nd Bt.		James Herbert	
1699	Robert Dormer		James Herbert	
1701	Sir Thomas Lee, 2nd Bt.		James Herbert	
July 1702	Sir John Pakington, 4th Bt.	Tory	James Herbert	
December 1702	Simon Harcourt		James Herbert	
1704	Simon Harcourt		Sir Henry Parker, 2nd Bt.	
1705	Sir John Wittewrong, 3rd Bt.		Simon Mayne	
1710	Simon Harcourt		John Essington	
January 1715	Nathaniel Meade		John Deacle	
April 1715	Nathaniel Meade		Trevor Hill	
1722	Richard Abell	Whig	John Guise	Whig
1727	Sir William Stanhope		Philip Lloyd	
1728 by-election	Edward Rudge		Philip Lloyd	
1730 by-election	Edward Rudge		Thomas Ingoldsby	
1734	George Champion		Christopher Tower	Whig
1741	Charles Pilsworth		Viscount Petersham	
1747	The Earl of Inchiquin	Whig	Edward Willes	
1754	Thomas Potter		John Willes	
1757	John Wilkes		John Willes	
1761	John Wilkes		Welbore Ellis	
1764 by-election	Anthony Bacon	Whig	Welbore Ellis	
1768	Anthony Bacon	Whig	John Durand	
1774	Anthony Bacon	Whig	John Aubrey	Tory
1780	Anthony Bacon	Whig	Thomas Orde	Tory
1784	Sir Thomas Hallifax		William Wrightson	
1789 by-election	Scrope Bernard		William Wrightson	
1790	Scrope Bernard		Gerard Lake	
1802	James Du Pre	Whig	Robert Bent	Whig
1804 by-election	James Du Pre	Whig	William Cavendish	Whig
1806	George Nugent, 1st Bt.	Tory	George Cavendish	Whig
1809 by-election	George Nugent, 1st Bt.	Tory	Thomas Hussey	Whig
1812	George Nugent-Grenville	Whig	Thomas Hussey	Whig
1814 by-election	George Nugent-Grenville	Whig	Charles Cavendish	Whig
1818	George Nugent-Grenville	Whig	William Rickford	Tory
1832	Henry Hanmer	Tory	William Rickford	Tory
1834	Henry Hanmer	Conservative	William Rickford	Conservative
1837	Winthrop Mackworth Praed	Conservative	William Rickford	Conservative
1839 by-election	Charles Baillie-Hamilton	Conservative	William Rickford	Conservative
1841	Charles Baillie-Hamilton	Conservative	Rice Richard Clayton	Conservative
1847	John Peter Deering	Conservative	The Lord Nugent	Whig
1848 by-election	Quintin Dick	Conservative	The Lord Nugent	Whig
1850 by-election	Quintin Dick	Conservative	Frederick Calvert	Whig
1851 by-election	Quintin Dick	Conservative	Richard Bethell	Whig
1852	Austen Henry Layard	Radical	Richard Bethell	Whig
1857	Thomas Bernard	Conservative	Richard Bethell	Whig
1859	Thomas Bernard	Conservative	Samuel George Smith	Conservative
1865	Nathan Rothschild	Liberal	Samuel George Smith	Conservative
1880	Nathan Rothschild	Liberal	George W. E. Russell	Liberal
1885 by-election	Ferdinand de Rothschild	Liberal	George W. E. Russell	Liberal
1885	Parliamentary borough abolished			

Back to Members of Parliament

=== MPs 1885–present ===
Under the Redistribution of Seats Act 1885, the parliamentary borough of Aylesbury was abolished. The name was transferred to a new, larger, county division of Buckinghamshire, which elected one Member of Parliament (MP).

Year	Member	Party
1885	Ferdinand de Rothschild	Liberal
1886	Ferdinand de Rothschild	Liberal Unionist
1899	Walter Rothschild	Liberal Unionist
1910	Lionel de Rothschild	Liberal Unionist
1912	Lionel de Rothschild	Unionist
1918	Lionel de Rothschild	Coalition Unionist
1922	Lionel de Rothschild	Unionist
1923	Thomas Keens	Liberal
1924	Sir Alan Burgoyne	Unionist
1929	Michael Beaumont	Conservative
1938	Sir Stanley Reed	Conservative
1950	Spencer Summers	Conservative
1970	Timothy Raison	Conservative
1992	Sir David Lidington	Conservative
2019	Rob Butler	Conservative
2024	Laura Kyrke-Smith	Labour

Back to Members of Parliament

== Elections ==
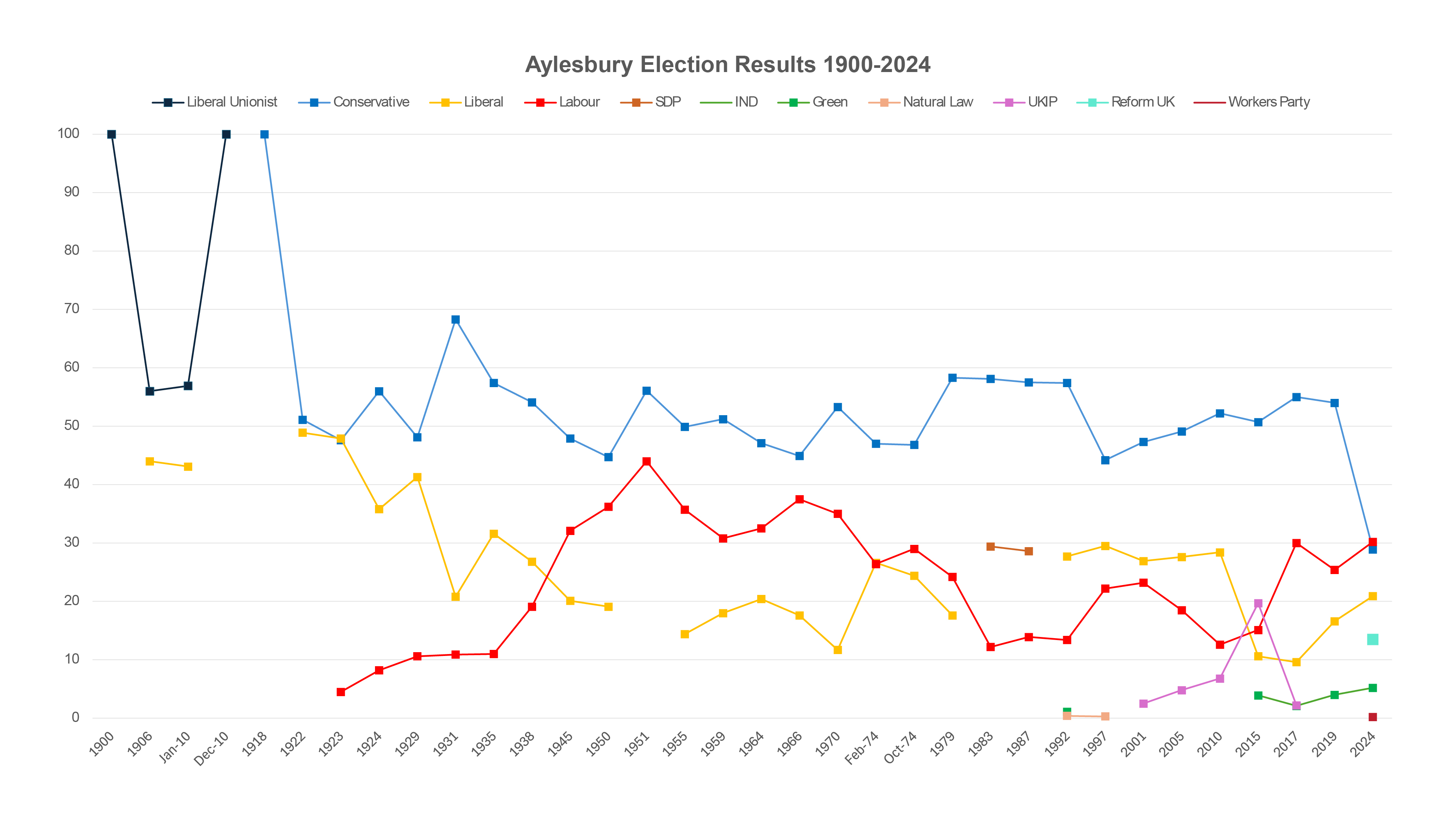
Aylesbury results 1900–2024

=== Elections in the 2020s ===
General election 2024: Aylesbury
Party	Candidate	Votes	%	±%
Labour	Laura Kyrke-Smith	15,081	30.2	+7.3
Conservative	Rob Butler	14,451	28.9	−22.8
Liberal Democrats	Steve Lambert	10,440	20.9	−1.0
Reform	Lesley Taylor	6,746	13.5	+13.0
Green	Julie Atkins	2,590	5.2	+2.3
Workers Party	Jan Gajdos	516	1.0	N/A
SDP	Richard Wilding	116	0.2	N/A
Majority		630	1.3	N/A
Turnout		49,940	63.1	−13.4
Registered electors		79,169		
Labour gain from Conservative		Swing	+15.1	

=== Elections in the 2010s ===
2019 notional result
Party	Vote	%
Conservative	29,924	51.7
Labour	13,284	22.9
Liberal Democrats	12,670	21.9
Green	1,701	2.9
Brexit Party	309	0.5
Turnout	57,888	76.5
Electorate	75,636	

General election 2019: Aylesbury
Party	Candidate	Votes	%	±%
Conservative	Rob Butler	32,737	54.0	−1.0
Labour	Liz Hind	15,364	25.4	−4.6
Liberal Democrats	Steven Lambert	10,081	16.6	+7.0
Green	Coral Simpson	2,394	4.0	+1.9
Majority		17,373	28.6	+3.6
Turnout		60,576	69.9	−1.5
Registered electors		86,665		
Conservative hold		Swing	+1.8	

General election 2017: Aylesbury
Party	Candidate	Votes	%	±%
Conservative	David Lidington	32,313	55.0	+4.3
Labour	Mark Bateman	17,657	30.0	+14.9
Liberal Democrats	Steven Lambert	5,660	9.6	−1.0
UKIP	Vijay Singh Srao	1,296	2.2	−17.5
Green	Coral Simpson	1,237	2.1	−1.8
Independent	Kyle Michael	620	1.1	N/A
Majority		14,656	25.0	−6.0
Turnout		58,743	71.4	+2.4
Registered electors		82,546		
Conservative hold		Swing	−5.3	

General election 2015: Aylesbury
Party	Candidate	Votes	%	±%
Conservative	David Lidington	28,083	50.7	−1.5
UKIP	Chris Adams	10,925	19.7	+12.9
Labour	William Cass	8,391	15.1	+2.5
Liberal Democrats	Steven Lambert	5,885	10.6	−17.8
Green	David Lyons	2,135	3.9	N/A
Majority		17,158	31.0	+7.2
Turnout		55,419	69.0	+0.8
Registered electors		80,315		
Conservative hold		Swing	−7.2	

General election 2010: Aylesbury
Party	Candidate	Votes	%	±%
Conservative	David Lidington	27,736	52.2	+3.1
Liberal Democrats	Steven Lambert	15,118	28.4	+0.8
Labour	Kathryn White	6,695	12.6	−5.9
UKIP	Chris Adams	3,613	6.8	+2.0
Majority		12,618	23.8	+2.3
Turnout		53,162	68.2	+5.8
Registered electors		77,844		
Conservative hold		Swing	+2.1	

Back to Elections

=== Elections in the 2000s ===
General election 2005: Aylesbury
Party	Candidate	Votes	%	±%
Conservative	David Lidington	25,252	49.1	+1.8
Liberal Democrats	Peter Jones	14,187	27.6	+0.7
Labour	Mohammed Khaliel	9,540	18.5	−4.7
UKIP	Chris Adams	2,479	4.8	+2.3
Majority		11,066	21.5	+1.1
Turnout		51,458	62.4	+1.0
Registered electors		81,320		
Conservative hold		Swing	+0.6	

General election 2001: Aylesbury
Party	Candidate	Votes	%	±%
Conservative	David Lidington	23,230	47.3	+3.1
Liberal Democrats	Peter M. Jones	13,221	26.9	−2.6
Labour	Keith M. White	11,388	23.2	+1.0
UKIP	Justin D. Harper	1,248	2.5	N/A
Majority		10,009	20.4	+5.7
Turnout		49,087	61.4	−11.4
Registered electors		80,002		
Conservative hold		Swing	+2.9	

Back to Elections

=== Elections in the 1990s ===
General election 1997: Aylesbury
Party	Candidate	Votes	%	±%
Conservative	David Lidington	25,426	44.2	−13.2
Liberal Democrats	Sharon Bowles	17,007	29.5	+1.8
Labour	Robert Langridge	12,759	22.2	+8.8
Referendum	Marc John	2,196	3.8	N/A
Natural Law	Lawrence R. Sheaff	166	0.3	+0.1
Majority		8,419	14.7	−15.0
Turnout		57,554	72.8	−6.6
Registered electors		79,047		
Conservative hold		Swing	−7.5	

General election 1992: Aylesbury
Party	Candidate	Votes	%	±%
Conservative	David Lidington	36,500	57.4	−0.1
Liberal Democrats	Sharon Bowles	17,640	27.7	−0.9
Labour	Roger Priest	8,517	13.4	−0.5
Green	Nigel A. Foster	702	1.1	N/A
Natural Law	Bruno H.M. D'Arcy	239	0.4	N/A
Majority		18,860	29.7	+0.8
Turnout		63,598	80.4	+5.9
Registered electors		79,208		
Conservative hold		Swing	+0.4	

Back to Elections

=== Elections in the 1980s ===
General election 1987: Aylesbury
Party	Candidate	Votes	%	±%
Conservative	Timothy Raison	32,970	57.5	−0.4
SDP	Michael Soole	16,412	28.6	−0.8
Labour	Julie Larner	7,936	13.9	+1.7
Majority		16,558	28.9	+0.2
Turnout		57,318	74.5	+3.0
Registered electors		76,919		
Conservative hold		Swing	+0.1	

General election 1983: Aylesbury
Party	Candidate	Votes	%	±%
Conservative	Timothy Raison	30,230	58.1	−0.2
SDP	Michael Soole	15,310	29.4	N/A
Labour	Michael Moran	6,364	12.2	−12.0
Independent	T. Chapman	166	0.3	N/A
Majority		14,920	28.7	−5.4
Turnout		52,070	71.5	−6.5
Registered electors		72,792		
Conservative hold		Swing		

Back to Elections

=== Elections in the 1970s ===
General election 1979: Aylesbury
Party	Candidate	Votes	%	±%
Conservative	Timothy Raison	33,953	58.3	+11.5
Labour	J.G. Power	14,091	24.2	−4.8
Liberal	M.J. Cook	10,248	17.6	−6.8
Majority		19,862	34.1	+16.3
Turnout		58,292	78.0	+3.6
Registered electors		74,746		
Conservative hold		Swing		

General election October 1974: Aylesbury
Party	Candidate	Votes	%	±%
Conservative	Timothy Raison	23,565	46.8	−0.2
Labour	Reginald Groves	14,592	29.0	+2.6
Liberal	M.J. Cook	12,219	24.4	−2.2
Majority		8,973	17.8	−2.6
Turnout		50,376	74.4	−16.8
Registered electors		67,729		
Conservative hold		Swing		

General election February 1974: Aylesbury
Party	Candidate	Votes	%	±%
Conservative	Timothy Raison	25,764	47.0	−5.2
Liberal	M.J. Cook	14,581	26.6	+14.6
Labour	Reginald Groves	14,463	26.4	−8.9
Majority		11,183	20.4	+2.1
Turnout		54,808	91.2	+15.7
Registered electors		60,070		
Conservative hold		Swing		

General election 1970: Aylesbury
Party	Candidate	Votes	%	±%
Conservative	Timothy Raison	31,084	53.3	+8.4
Labour	James E. Mitchell	20,441	35.0	−2.5
Liberal	Philip S. Kinsey	6,849	11.7	−5.9
Majority		10,643	18.3	+10.9
Turnout		58,374	75.5	−4.4
Registered electors		77,358		
Conservative hold		Swing	+5.5	

Back to Elections

=== Elections in the 1960s ===
General election 1966: Aylesbury
Party	Candidate	Votes	%	±%
Conservative	Spencer Summers	23,673	44.9	−2.2
Labour	Peter Allison	19,766	37.5	+5.0
Liberal	Timothy Joyce	9,272	17.6	−2.7
Majority		3,907	7.41	−7.2
Turnout		52,711	79.9	−0.12
Registered electors		65,968		
Conservative hold		Swing		

General election 1964: Aylesbury
Party	Candidate	Votes	%	±%
Conservative	Spencer Summers	23,856	47.1	−4.1
Labour	Gordon Western	16,467	32.5	+1.7
Liberal	Timothy Joyce	10,301	20.4	+2.4
Majority		7,389	14.6	−5.8
Turnout		50,624	80.0	−1.3
Registered electors		63,262		
Conservative hold		Swing		

Back to Elections

=== Elections in the 1950s ===
General election 1959: Aylesbury
Party	Candidate	Votes	%	±%
Conservative	Spencer Summers	22,504	51.2	+1.3
Labour	Hugh Gray	13,549	30.8	−5.0
Liberal	Howard Levett Fry	7,897	18.0	+3.6
Majority		8,955	20.4	+6.3
Turnout		43,950	81.3	−0.5
Registered electors		54,089		
Conservative hold		Swing		

General election 1955: Aylesbury
Party	Candidate	Votes	%	±%
Conservative	Spencer Summers	20,330	49.9	−6.2
Labour	Tony Harman	14,569	35.7	−8.3
Liberal	Howard Levett Fry	5,869	14.4	N/A
Majority		5,761	14.1	+2.0
Turnout		40,768	81.8	−1.3
Registered electors		49,841		
Conservative hold		Swing		

General election 1951: Aylesbury
Party	Candidate	Votes	%	±%
Conservative	Spencer Summers	22,455	56.1	+11.4
Labour	Tony Harman	17,605	44.0	+7.8
Majority		4,850	12.1	+3.6
Turnout		40,060	83.1	−0.3
Registered electors		48,181		
Conservative hold		Swing		

General election 1950: Aylesbury
Party	Candidate	Votes	%	±%
Conservative	Spencer Summers	17,623	44.7	−3.2
Labour	Tony Harman	14,262	36.2	+4.1
Liberal	Guthrie Moir	7,547	19.1	−1.0
Majority		3,361	8.5	−7.3
Turnout		39,432	83.4	+13.8
Registered electors		47,261		
Conservative hold		Swing		

Back to Elections

=== Elections in the 1940s ===
General election 1945: Aylesbury
Party	Candidate	Votes	%	±%
Conservative	Stanley Reed	24,537	47.9	
Labour	Reginald Groves	16,445	32.1	
Liberal	Guy Naylor	10,302	20.1	
Majority		8,092	15.8	
Turnout		51,284	69.6	
Registered electors		73,737		
Conservative hold		Swing		

General Election 1939–40:

Another General Election was required to take place before the end of 1940. The political parties had been making preparations for an election to take place from 1939 and by the end of this year, the following candidates had been selected;

- Conservative:Stanley Reed
- Liberal: Atholl Robertson
- Labour: Reginald Groves

Back to Elections

=== Elections in the 1930s ===
1938 Aylesbury by-election
Party	Candidate	Votes	%	±%
Conservative	Stanley Reed	21,695	54.1	−1.3
Liberal	T. Atholl Robertson	10,751	26.8	−4.8
Labour	Reginald Groves	7,666	19.1	+8.2
Majority		10,994	27.3	+1.5
Turnout		40,112	63.1	−7.1
Conservative hold		Swing		

Wintringham

General election 1935: Aylesbury
Party	Candidate	Votes	%	±%
Conservative	Michael Beaumont	24,728	57.4	−10.9
Liberal	Margaret Wintringham	13,622	31.6	−10.8
Labour	Eric W. Shearer	4,716	11.0	+0.1
Majority		11,106	25.8	−21.8
Turnout		43,066	70.2	−5.4
Registered electors		61,315		
Conservative hold		Swing		

C.B. Dallow

General election 1931: Aylesbury
Party	Candidate	Votes	%	±%
Conservative	Michael Beaumont	29,368	68.3	+20.2
Liberal	Cyril Berkeley Dallow	8,927	20.8	−20.5
Labour	Dorothy Woodman	4,677	10.9	+0.3
Majority		20,441	47.6	+40.8
Turnout		42,972	75.6	−3.1
Conservative hold		Swing		

Back to Elections

=== Elections in the 1920s ===
General election 1929: Aylesbury
Party	Candidate	Votes	%	±%
Unionist	Michael Beaumont	20,478	48.1	−7.9
Liberal	Thomas Keens	17,594	41.3	+5.5
Labour	F G Temple	4,509	10.6	+2.4
Majority		2,884	6.8	−13.4
Turnout		42,531	78.7	−3.3
Unionist hold		Swing	−6.7	

General election 1924: Aylesbury
Party	Candidate	Votes	%	±%
Unionist	Alan Hughes Burgoyne	18,132	56.0	+8.4
Liberal	Thomas Keens	11,574	35.8	−12.1
Labour	Fred Watkins	2,655	8.2	+3.7
Majority		6,558	20.2	N/A
Turnout		32,361	82.0	+7.3
Unionist gain from Liberal		Swing	+10.2	

General election 1923: Aylesbury
Party	Candidate	Votes	%	±%
Liberal	Thomas Keens	13,575	47.9	−1.0
Unionist	Alan Hughes Burgoyne	13,504	47.6	−3.5
Labour	Fred Watkins	1,275	4.5	N/A
Majority		71	0.3	N/A
Turnout		28,354	74.7	+3.3
Liberal gain from Unionist		Swing	+1.3	

General election 1922: Aylesbury
Party	Candidate	Votes	%	±%
Unionist	Lionel de Rothschild	13,406	51.1	N/A
Liberal	Thomas Keens	12,835	48.9	N/A
Majority		571	2.2	N/A
Turnout		26,241	71.4	N/A
Unionist hold		Swing	N/A	

Back to Elections

=== Elections in the 1910s ===
General election 1918: Aylesbury
Party		Candidate	Votes	%	±%
C	Unionist	Lionel de Rothschild	Unopposed		
	Unionist hold				
C indicates candidate endorsed by the coalition government.

General election December 1910: Aylesbury
Party	Candidate	Votes	%	±%
Liberal Unionist	Lionel de Rothschild	Unopposed		
Liberal Unionist hold				

General election January 1910: Aylesbury
Party	Candidate	Votes	%	±%
Liberal Unionist	Lionel de Rothschild	6,037	56.9	+0.9
Liberal	A.R.W. Atkins	4,574	43.1	−0.9
Majority		1,463	13.8	+1.8
Turnout		10,611	86.8	−0.1
Registered electors		12,218		
Liberal Unionist hold		Swing	+0.9	

Back to Elections

=== Elections in the 1900s ===
General election 1906: Aylesbury
Party	Candidate	Votes	%	±%
Liberal Unionist	Walter Rothschild	5,675	56.0	N/A
Liberal	Silas Hocking	4,463	44.0	N/A
Majority		1,212	12.0	N/A
Turnout		10,138	86.9	N/A
Registered electors		11,661		
Liberal Unionist hold		Swing	N/A	

General election 1900: Aylesbury
Party	Candidate	Votes	%	±%
Liberal Unionist	Walter Rothschild	Unopposed		
Liberal Unionist hold				

Back to Elections

=== Elections in the 1890s ===
By-election, 1899: Aylesbury
Party	Candidate	Votes	%	±%
Liberal Unionist	Walter Rothschild	Unopposed		
Liberal Unionist hold				

General election 1895: Aylesbury
Party	Candidate	Votes	%	±%
Liberal Unionist	Ferdinand de Rothschild	Unopposed		
Liberal Unionist hold				

General election 1892: Aylesbury
Party	Candidate	Votes	%	±%
Liberal Unionist	Ferdinand de Rothschild	5,515	64.8	−9.0
Liberal	T.H. Dolbey	2,992	35.2	+9.0
Majority		2,523	29.6	−18.0
Turnout		8,507	77.8	+17.0
Registered electors		10,928		
Liberal Unionist hold		Swing	−9.0	

Back to Elections

=== Elections in the 1880s ===
General election 1886: Aylesbury
Party	Candidate	Votes	%	±%
Liberal Unionist	Ferdinand de Rothschild	4,723	73.8	+42.5
Liberal	Charles Durant Hodgson	1,680	26.2	−39.0
Majority		3,043	47.6	N/A
Turnout		6,403	60.8	−18.9
Registered electors		10,535		
Liberal Unionist gain from Liberal		Swing	+40.8	

Rothschild

General election 1885: Aylesbury
Party	Candidate	Votes	%	±%
Liberal	Ferdinand de Rothschild	5,476	65.2	−7.5
Conservative	Frederick Charsley	2,624	31.3	+4.0
Independent Liberal	Charles James Clarke	296	3.5	N/A
Majority		2,852	33.9	+26.6
Turnout		8,396	79.7	+14.1 (est)
Registered electors		10,535		
Liberal hold		Swing	−5.8	

By-election, 18 Jul 1885: Aylesbury
Party	Candidate	Votes	%	±%
Liberal	Ferdinand de Rothschild	2,353	62.4	−10.3
Conservative	William Graham	1,416	37.6	+10.3
Majority		937	24.8	+17.5
Turnout		3,769	84.3	+18.7 (est)
Registered electors		4,473		
Liberal hold		Swing	−10.3	

- Caused by Rothschild's elevation to the peerage, becoming Lord Rothschild.

General election 1880: Aylesbury (Two seats)
Party	Candidate	Votes	%	±%
Liberal	Nathan Rothschild	2,111	38.1	−0.8
Liberal	George W. E. Russell	1,919	34.6	+9.3
Conservative	Samuel George Smith	1,511	27.3	−8.6
Majority		408	7.3	N/A
Turnout		2,771 (est)	65.6 (est)	+9.9
Registered electors		4,228		
Liberal hold		Swing	+3.5	
Liberal gain from Conservative		Swing	+6.8	

Back to Elections

=== Elections in the 1870s ===
General election 1874: Aylesbury (Two seats)
Party	Candidate	Votes	%	±%
Liberal	Nathan Rothschild	1,761	38.9	−3.5
Conservative	Samuel George Smith	1,624	35.9	+0.8
Lib-Lab	George Howell	1,144	25.3	+2.8
Turnout		2,265 (est)	55.7 (est)	−2.4
Registered electors		4,064		
Majority		137	3.0	−4.3
Liberal hold		Swing	−2.5	
Majority		480	10.6	−2.0
Conservative hold		Swing	−0.3	

Back to Elections

=== Elections in the 1860s ===
General election 1868: Aylesbury (Two seats)
Party	Candidate	Votes	%	±%
Liberal	Nathan Rothschild	1,772	42.4	N/A
Conservative	Samuel George Smith	1,468	35.1	N/A
Lib-Lab	George Howell	942	22.5	N/A
Turnout		2,091 (est)	58.1 (est)	N/A
Registered electors		3,602		
Majority		304	7.3	N/A
Liberal hold		Swing	N/A	
Majority		526	12.6	N/A
Conservative hold		Swing	N/A	

General election 1865: Aylesbury (Two seats)
Party	Candidate	Votes	%	±%
Liberal	Nathan Rothschild	Unopposed		
Conservative	Samuel George Smith	Unopposed		
Registered electors		1,225		
Liberal gain from Conservative				
Conservative hold				

Back to Elections

=== Elections in the 1850s ===
General election 1859: Aylesbury (Two seats)
Party	Candidate	Votes	%	±%
Conservative	Thomas Bernard	552	34.0	+15.6
Conservative	Samuel George Smith	535	33.0	+14.6
Liberal	Thomas Wentworth	534	33.0	−30.2
Majority		1	0.0	N/A
Turnout		1,079 (est)	82.7 (est)	+24.0
Registered electors		1,304		
Conservative hold		Swing	+15.4	
Conservative gain from Liberal		Swing	+14.9	

- On the original count, both Smith and Wentworth received 535 votes, meaning there were three MPs elected. However, after scrutiny, Wentworth lost one vote and was declared unduly elected on 2 August 1859.

General election 1857: Aylesbury (Two seats)
Party	Candidate	Votes	%	±%
Conservative	Thomas Bernard	546	36.7	−8.1
Whig	Richard Bethell	501	33.7	+7.0
Radical	Austen Henry Layard	439	29.5	+1.1
Turnout		743 (est)	58.7 (est)	−10.6
Registered electors		1,266		
Majority		107	7.2	N/A
Conservative gain from Radical		Swing	−2.6	
Majority		62	4.2	+0.2
Whig hold		Swing	+5.5	

By-election, 9 February 1857: Aylesbury
Party	Candidate	Votes	%	±%
Whig	Richard Bethell	Unopposed		
Whig hold				

- Caused by Bethell's appointment as Attorney General for England and Wales

By-election, 6 January 1853: Aylesbury
Party	Candidate	Votes	%	±%
Whig	Richard Bethell	Unopposed		
Whig hold				

- Caused by Bethell's appointment as Solicitor General for England and Wales

General election 1852: Aylesbury (Two seats)
Party	Candidate	Votes	%	±%
Radical	Austen Henry Layard	558	28.4	N/A
Whig	Richard Bethell	525	26.7	−6.8
Conservative	Augustus Frederick Bayford	447	22.7	−14.4
Conservative	John Temple West	435	22.1	−7.4
Turnout		983 (est)	69.3 (est)	+8.1
Registered electors		1,417		
Majority		123	6.3	N/A
Radical gain from Conservative		Swing	+2.1	
Majority		78	4.0	0.0
Whig hold		Swing		

By-election, 11 April 1851: Aylesbury
Party	Candidate	Votes	%	±%
Whig	Richard Bethell	544	51.2	+17.7
Conservative	William Ferrand	518	48.8	−17.8
Majority		26	2.4	−1.6
Turnout		1,062	70.2	+9.0
Registered electors		1,512		
Whig hold		Swing	+17.8	

- Caused by the 1850 by-election being declared void on petition due to treating and bribery.

By-election, 27 December 1850: Aylesbury
Party	Candidate	Votes	%	±%
Whig	Frederick Calvert	499	77.2	N/A
Whig	John Houghton	147	22.8	N/A
Majority		352	54.4	+51.4
Turnout		646	42.7	−18.5
Registered electors		1,512		
Whig hold		Swing	N/A	

- Caused by Nugent-Grenville's death. Houghton retired before polling.

Back to Elections

=== Elections in the 1840s ===
By-election, 29 March 1848: Aylesbury
Party	Candidate	Votes	%	±%
Conservative	Quintin Dick	614	64.0	−2.6
Whig	John Houghton	345	36.0	+2.5
Majority		269	28.0	+24.4
Turnout		959	63.4	+2.2
Registered electors		1,513		
Conservative hold		Swing	−2.6	

- Caused by Deering's election being declared void on petition due to treating by his agents.

General election 1847: Aylesbury (Two seats)
Party	Candidate	Votes	%	±%
Conservative	John Peter Deering	687	37.1	N/A
Whig	George Nugent-Grenville	620	33.5	N/A
Conservative	Rice Richard Clayton	546	29.5	N/A
Turnout		927 (est)	61.2 (est)	N/A
Registered electors		1,513		
Majority		67	3.6	N/A
Conservative hold		Swing	N/A	
Majority		74	4.0	N/A
Whig gain from Conservative		Swing	N/A	

General election 1841: Aylesbury (Two seats)
Party	Candidate	Votes	%	±%
Conservative	Charles Baillie-Hamilton	Unopposed		
Conservative	Rice Richard Clayton	Unopposed		
Registered electors		1,624		
Conservative hold				
Conservative hold				

Back to top

=== Elections in the 1830s ===
By-election, 31 July 1839: Aylesbury
Party	Candidate	Votes	%	±%
Conservative	Charles Baillie-Hamilton	620	89.2	+15.4
Radical	John Ingram Lockhart	72	10.4	N/A
Whig	George Nugent-Grenville	3	0.4	−25.8
Majority		548	78.8	+73.1
Turnout		695	49.1	−34.9
Registered electors		1,416		
Conservative hold		Swing	+20.6	

- Caused by Praed's death

General election 1837: Aylesbury
Party	Candidate	Votes	%	±%
Whig	William Rickford	865	41.9	+3.4
Conservative	Winthrop Mackworth Praed	657	31.9	+5.5
Whig	George Nugent-Grenville	540	26.2	+14.1
Majority		117	5.7	+2.2
Turnout		1,188	84.0	+5.6
Registered electors		1,414		
Whig hold		Swing	−1.8	
Conservative hold		Swing	−0.8	

General election 1835: Aylesbury
Party	Candidate	Votes	%	±%
Whig	William Rickford	855	38.5	−7.6
Conservative	Henry Hanmer	586	26.4	−1.7
Radical	Thomas Hobhouse	508	22.9	−2.9
Whig	John Lee	269	12.1	N/A
Majority		78	3.5	+1.2
Turnout		1,210	78.4	+1.7
Registered electors		1,544		
Whig hold		Swing	−3.1	
Conservative hold		Swing	−0.1	

General election 1832: Aylesbury
Party	Candidate	Votes	%	±%
Whig	William Rickford	1,076	46.1	−0.7
Tory	Henry Hanmer	657	28.1	+3.9
Radical	Thomas Hobhouse	602	25.8	N/A
Majority		55	2.3	−15.7
Turnout		1,268	76.7	
Registered electors		1,654		
Whig hold		Swing	N/A	
Tory gain from Whig		Swing	N/A	

General election 1831: Aylesbury
Party	Candidate	Votes	%	±%
Whig	William Rickford	986	46.8	N/A
Whig	George Nugent-Grenville	606	28.8	N/A
Tory	Thomas FitzMaurice	509	24.2	N/A
Turnout		1,150		N/A
Majority		380	18.0	N/A
Whig hold		Swing	N/A	
Majority		97	4.6	N/A
Whig hold		Swing	N/A	

By-election, 3 December 1830: Aylesbury
Party	Candidate	Votes	%	±%
Whig	George Nugent-Grenville	Unopposed		
Whig hold				

- Caused by Nugent-Grenville's appointment as a Lord Commissioner of the Treasury

General election 1830: Aylesbury
Party	Candidate	Votes	%	±%
Whig	William Rickford	Unopposed		
Whig	George Nugent-Grenville	Unopposed		
Whig hold				
Whig hold				

Back to top

== See also ==
- List of parliamentary constituencies in Buckinghamshire
- List of parliamentary constituencies in the South East England (region)

== Bibliography ==
- Iain Dale, ed. (2003). The Times House of Commons 1929, 1931, 1935. Politico's (reprint). ISBN 1-84275-033-X.
- The Times House of Commons 1945. 1945.
- The Times House of Commons 1950. 1950.
- The Times House of Commons 1955. 1955.
- British Parliamentary Election Results 1885–1918, compiled and edited by F.W.S. Craig (Macmillan Press 1974)
- British Parliamentary Election Results 1918–1949, compiled and edited by F.W.S. Craig (Macmillan Press, revised edition 1977)
