= John Walwyn =

16th-century English politician

John Walwyn (by 1520 – 1566 or later), of Aylesbury, Buckinghamshire, was an English politician.

== Family ==
John Walwyn was the eldest son of Edmund Walwyn of Thornborough, Buckinghamshire and his wife Anne née Green, daughter of Thomas Green of Greens-Norton, Northamptonshire. Walwyn married three times. His first wife was Alice née Falkener, daughter of William Falkener of Quarrendon, Buckinghamshire. They had three sons and two daughters. His second wife was Joan née Hokeley, daughter of John Hokeley of Bromwich, Staffordshire, and they had three sons. His third wife was Joan née Cook, daughter of Robert Cook of Tandridge, Surrey, by whom he had two sons and one daughter.

== Career ==
He was a member (MP) of the Parliament of England for Aylesbury in November 1554.
