= Walter Rothschild, 2nd Baron Rothschild =

British banker and zoologist (1868–1937)

The Right Honourable The Lord Rothschild FRS
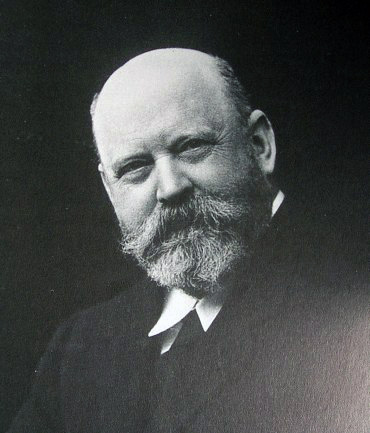

Member of Parliament for Aylesbury
- In office 6 January 1899 – 10 January 1910
- Preceded by: Ferdinand de Rothschild
- Succeeded by: Lionel de Rothschild

Personal details
- Born: Lionel Walter Rothschild; 8 February 1868 London, England
- Died: 27 August 1937 (aged 69) Tring, Hertfordshire, England
- Party: Liberal Unionist; Conservative (after 1912)
- Relatives: Rothschild family
- Education: University of Bonn; Magdalene College, Cambridge
- Occupation: Banker; Politician; Zoologist; Soldier

Military service
- Allegiance: United Kingdom
- Branch/service: Territorial Army
- Rank: Major
- Scientific career
- Known for: One of the world's largest natural history collections
- Fields: Zoology
- Author abbrev. (zoology): Rothschild

Lionel Walter Rothschild, 2nd Baron Rothschild, Baron de Rothschild (8 February 1868 – 27 August 1937), was a British banker, politician, zoologist, and soldier, who was a member of the Rothschild family. As a Zionist leader, he was presented with the Balfour Declaration, which pledged British support for a Jewish national home in Palestine. Rothschild was the president of the Board of Deputies of British Jews from 1925 to 1926.

== Early life ==
Walter Rothschild was born in London as the eldest son and heir of Emma Louise von Rothschild and Nathan Rothschild, 1st Baron Rothschild, an immensely wealthy financier of the international Rothschild financial dynasty and the first Jewish peer in England.

The eldest of three children, Walter was deemed to have delicate health and was educated at home. As a young man, he travelled in Europe, attending the University of Bonn for a year before entering Magdalene College, Cambridge. In 1889, leaving Cambridge after two years, he was required to go into the family banking business to study finance.

At the age of seven, he declared that he would run a zoological museum and, as a child, he collected insects, butterflies, and other animals. Among his pets at the family home in Tring Park were kangaroos and exotic birds. As a boy, Rothschild was once dragged off his horse and assaulted by workmen while on a hunting ride near Tring, an experience he attributed to antisemitism.

At 21, he reluctantly went to work at the family bank, N M Rothschild & Sons, in London. He worked there from 1889 to 1908. He evidently lacked any interest or ability in the financial profession, but it was not until 1908, at the age of 40, that he was finally allowed to give it up. However, his parents established a zoological museum as a compensation and footed the bill for expeditions all over the world to seek out animals.

Rothschild was 6 ft 3 in (1.91 m) tall, suffered from a speech impediment, and was very shy, but he had his photograph taken riding on a giant tortoise and drove a carriage harnessed to four zebras to Buckingham Palace to prove that zebras could be tamed.

Though he never married, Rothschild had two mistresses, one of whom bore him a daughter, Olga Alice Muriel Rothschild, who would marry Richard Yarde-Buller, 4th Baron Churston, and be Baroness Churston.

== Zoological career ==
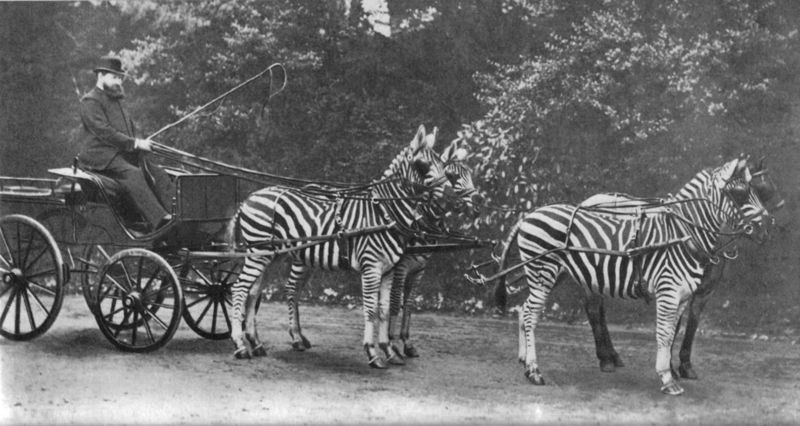
Rothschild with his famed zebra (Equus quagga) carriage, which he drove to Buckingham Palace to demonstrate the tame character of zebras to the public

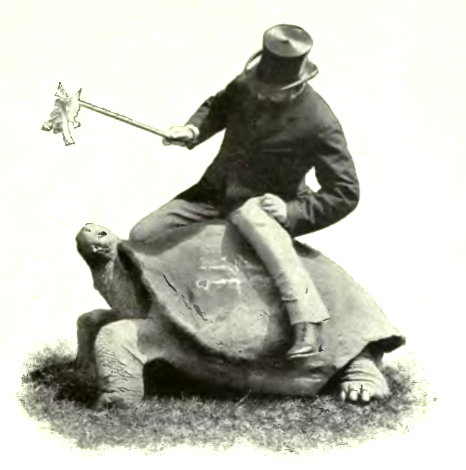
Lord Rothschild on a giant tortoise

Rothschild studied zoology at Magdalene College, Cambridge. Meeting Albert Günther sparked his interest in the taxonomy of birds and butterflies.

Although Rothschild himself travelled and collected in Europe and North Africa for many years, his work and health concerns limited his range, and beginning while at Cambridge he employed others (explorers, professional collectors, and residents) to collect for him in remote and little-known parts of the world. He also hired taxidermists, a librarian, and, most importantly, professional scientists to work with him to curate and write up the resulting collections: Ernst Hartert, for birds, from 1892 until his retirement at the age of 70 in 1930 and Karl Jordan for entomology, from 1893 until Rothschild's death in 1937.

At its largest, Rothschild's collection included 300,000 bird skins, 200,000 birds' eggs, 2,250,000 butterflies, and 30,000 beetles, as well as thousands of specimens of mammals, reptiles, and fishes. They formed the largest zoological collection ever amassed by a private individual.

The Rothschild giraffe (Giraffa camelopardalis rothschildi), a subspecies with five ossicones instead of two, was named after him. Another 153 insects, 58 birds, 17 mammals, three fish, three spiders, two reptiles, one millipede, and one worm also carry his name.

Rothschild opened his private museum in 1892. It housed one of the largest natural history collections in the world and was open to the public. In 1932, he was forced to sell the vast majority of his bird collection to the American Museum of Natural History after he had been blackmailed by a former mistress.

In 1933, he was one of eleven people (Note: The letter was signed: Desborough; Hugh S. Gladstone; Grey of Fallodon; Julian S. Huxley (Chancellor of Oxford University); T. G Longstaff; Percy R. Lowe; P. Chalmers Mitchell; Rothschild; Scone M.P. (Chairman, British Trust for Ornithology); E. L. Turner; H. F. Witherby (President, British Ornithologists' Union)) involved in the appeal that led to the foundation of the British Trust for Ornithology (BTO), an organization for the study of birds in the British Isles.

On his death in 1937, his museum and all of its contents were given in his will to the British Museum (of which the Natural History Museum, London, was then a part), the greatest accession that the institution has ever received. The Walter Rothschild Zoological Museum at Tring is now a division of the Natural History Museum.

Following a visit to Hungary in 1902, Rothschild brought six live edible dormice (Glis glis) back to Tring. Some of them escaped and started breeding successfully in the wild. They have now become a localized pest over an area of approximately 200 square miles in a triangle between Luton, Aylesbury, and Beaconsfield, and there are estimated to be at least 10,000 of them. Even though considered an invasive species, they are protected under the Wildlife and Countryside Act 1981.

Rothschild was awarded an honorary doctorate by the University of Giessen in 1898, was elected a Trustee of the British Museum in 1899, and was elected a Fellow of the Royal Society in 1911.

== Political career ==
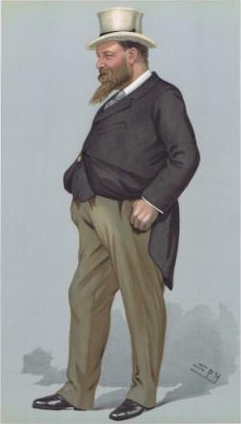
Rothschild caricatured by Spy for Vanity Fair, 1900

Walter Rothschild was a Liberal Unionist Party Member of Parliament for Aylesbury from 1899 until he retired from politics at the January 1910 general election.

== Military activities ==
Despite his health, Rothschild served part-time as an officer in a Territorial Army unit, the Royal Buckinghamshire Yeomanry, where he was a captain from July 1902 until he was promoted to major in 1903, before retiring in 1909.

== Zionism and Balfour Declaration ==
As an active Zionist and a close friend of Chaim Weizmann, he worked to formulate the draft declaration for a Jewish homeland in British Mandate-Palestine. On 2 November 1917, he received a letter from the British foreign secretary, Arthur Balfour, addressed to his London home at 148 Piccadilly. In the letter, the British government declared its support for the establishment in Palestine of "a national home for the Jewish people". The letter became known as the Balfour Declaration.

== Peerage and death ==
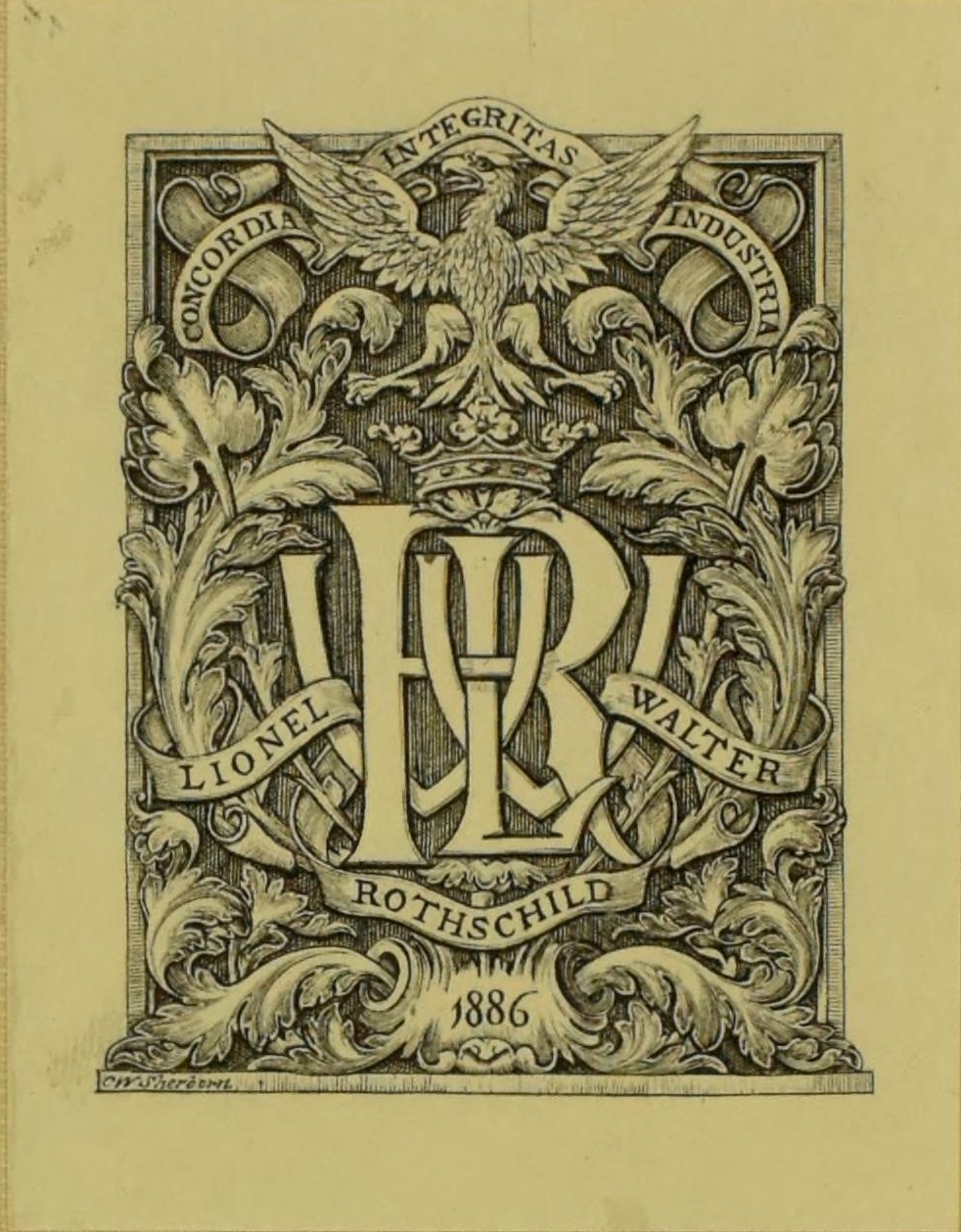
Bookplate designed by Charles William Sherborn

Walter inherited the British peerage title Baron Rothschild from his father Nathan Rothschild, 1st Baron Rothschild, in 1915. He died of cancer of the spinal cord in 1937 at Tring Park, Hertfordshire, aged 69, and was buried in Willesden Jewish Cemetery, London. He had no legitimate children, and his younger brother Charles had predeceased him, so the title was inherited by his nephew Victor.

Furthermore, he also inherited the title "Baron de Rothschild" (Freiherr von Rothschild) of the Austrian nobility, which was an authorized title in the United Kingdom by Warrant of 27 April 1932.

In 1838, Queen Victoria had authorized the use of this Austrian title in the United Kingdom.

== Ancestry ==
Ancestors of Walter Rothschild, 2nd Baron Rothschild

8. Baron Nathan Mayer Rothschild
4. Baron Lionel de Rothschild
9. Hannah Barent Cohen
2. Nathan Rothschild, 1st Baron Rothschild
10. Baron Carl Mayer von Rothschild
5. Baroness Charlotte von Rothschild
11. Adelheid Herz
1. Walter Rothschild, 2nd Baron Rothschild
12. Baron Carl Mayer von Rothschild (=10)
6. Baron Mayer Carl von Rothschild
13. Adelheid Herz (=11)
3. Baroness Emma von Rothschild
14. Baron Nathan Mayer Rothschild (=8)
7. Baroness Louise von Rothschild
15. Hannah Barent Cohen (=9)

== See also ==
- Extinct Birds
- History of the Jews in England
- Rothschild banking family of England
- Waddesdon Manor

== Publications ==
Rothschild is the author of around 765 publications. Of these, 27 were co-authored with Ernst Hartert and 16 with Karl Jordan. He published 278 articles in the Bulletin of the British Ornithologists' Club and 318 articles in the Novitates Zoologicae, a journal which he established in 1894 with himself, Hartert, and Jordan as editors.

His publications include:

- The Avifauna of Laysan and the Neighbouring Islands : with a complete history to date of the birds of the Hawaiian possessions. London: R.H. Porter. 1893–1900.
- A revision of the lepidopterous family Sphingidae. Novitates Zoologicae. Vol. IX. Supplement. Vol. 1. Tring, Hertfordshire, UK: Self Published. 1903.
- "A monograph of the genus Casuarius". Transactions of the Zoological Society of London. 15 (5): 109–148. 1900. doi:10.1111/j.1096-3642.1900.tb00022.x.
- Extinct birds. London: Hutchinson. 1907.

== Notes ==
Parliament of the United Kingdom
Preceded by Ferdinand de Rothschild	Member of Parliament for Aylesbury; 1899 – Jan 1910	Succeeded by Lionel de Rothschild
Peerage of the United Kingdom
Preceded by Nathan Rothschild	Baron Rothschild; 1915–1937	Succeeded by Victor Rothschild
Austrian nobility
Preceded by Nathan Rothschild	Baron de Rothschild; 1915–1937	Succeeded by Victor Rothschild (non-authorized)
