= David Willey (journalist) =

British journalist (1932–2026)

David Willey OBE
- Born: David Douglas Willey; 17 October 1932; High Wycombe, Buckinghamshire, England
- Died: 12 July 2026 (aged 93); Italy
- Education: Sir William Borlase's Grammar School, Buckinghamshire; Queens' College, Cambridge
- Occupations: Journalist; author
- Years active: 1960–2026
- Employers: BBC; Reuters
- Known for: BBC Rome and Vatican Correspondent

David Douglas Willey (17 October 1932 – 12 July 2026) was a British BBC reporter and journalist, based in Rome. He served as Rome and Vatican correspondent from 1971 until his death, under five popes.

== Early life and education ==
David Douglas Willey was born in High Wycombe, Buckinghamshire, on 17 October 1932. He was the grandson of an Italian master woodcarver, from Venice, and was brought up in the town of Marlow in Buckinghamshire.

He was educated at Sir William Borlase's Grammar School, a state grammar school in the town, followed by Queens' College, Cambridge, where he studied law and modern languages.

== Career ==
After graduation, Willey joined Reuters, at a trainee post in Rome, where he covered the signing of the Treaty of Rome in 1957. One of his most vivid memories of that year was seeing a shepherd guiding a flock of several hundred sheep along one of Rome's main streets, the Via del Corso, early on a Sunday morning.

This was followed by a period in Algeria (1960–64), where he worked as a freelance reporter after that country's independence from France in 1962. In 1964, he became the BBC's correspondent in East Africa. His career continued in 1965 with a spell in Asia, where he reported widely on the early part of the Vietnam War from Saigon, then the capital of South Vietnam. Also in 1965 he reported from Beijing for the BBC, as one of its first foreign correspondents to report from China since the 1949 communist revolution. He was based in London from 1969 to 1971 in the post of the corporation's Assistant Diplomatic Correspondent and was appointed the BBC's Rome correspondent in August 1972.

Willey was the author of The Promise of Francis: The Man, the Pope and the Challenge of Change (Simon & Schuster, 2015) which assesses the high expectations aroused by the election of the first pope from Latin America. His other books include: Italians (BBC Books, 1984) and God's Politician (Faber & Faber, and St Martin's Press, 1992), a critical biography of Pope John Paul II, whom he accompanied on more than 40 of his foreign journeys as a member of the Vatican press corps.

== Later life and death ==
Willey was appointed Officer of the Order of the British Empire (OBE) in the 2003 Birthday Honours. He died from heart failure in Italy, on 12 July 2026, aged 93.
