= Simon Mayne =

English politician (1612–1661)

Simon Mayne (1612 – 13 April 1661) was a Member of Parliament for Aylesbury and one of the regicides of King Charles I of England.

Simon was born and lived at Dinton Hall in Buckinghamshire, the son of Simon Mayne Snr and his wife, Colubria the sister of Richard Lovelace, 1st Baron Lovelace. His father died when he was aged five, leaving him the Dinton Hall estate after the death of his mother (in 1629). He was educated at Thame in Oxfordshire at Lord Williams's School and admitted to the Inner Temple in 1630. He married Jane Burgoyne in 1633. After her death in 1641, he married Elizabeth Tow, a widow, with whom he had three sons.

In 1645, he was elected as Member of Parliament for Aylesbury (and was elected again in 1659). In January 1649, as a judge of the High Court of Justice at the trial of King Charles, he was 40th of the 59 signatories on the death warrant of the monarch.

After the Restoration, he was tried and sentenced to death, he died in the Tower of London in 1661 before his appeal could be heard. His body was returned to Dinton and buried in the church.

The estate was inherited by his son, Simon Mayne, who also represented Aylesbury in Parliament and was a commissioner of victualling under William and Mary.
