= Sir Thomas Lee, 2nd Baronet =

English politician

Sir Thomas Lee, 2nd Baronet (ca. 1661 – 13 August 1702) was an English politician who sat in the House of Commons from 1689 to 1699.

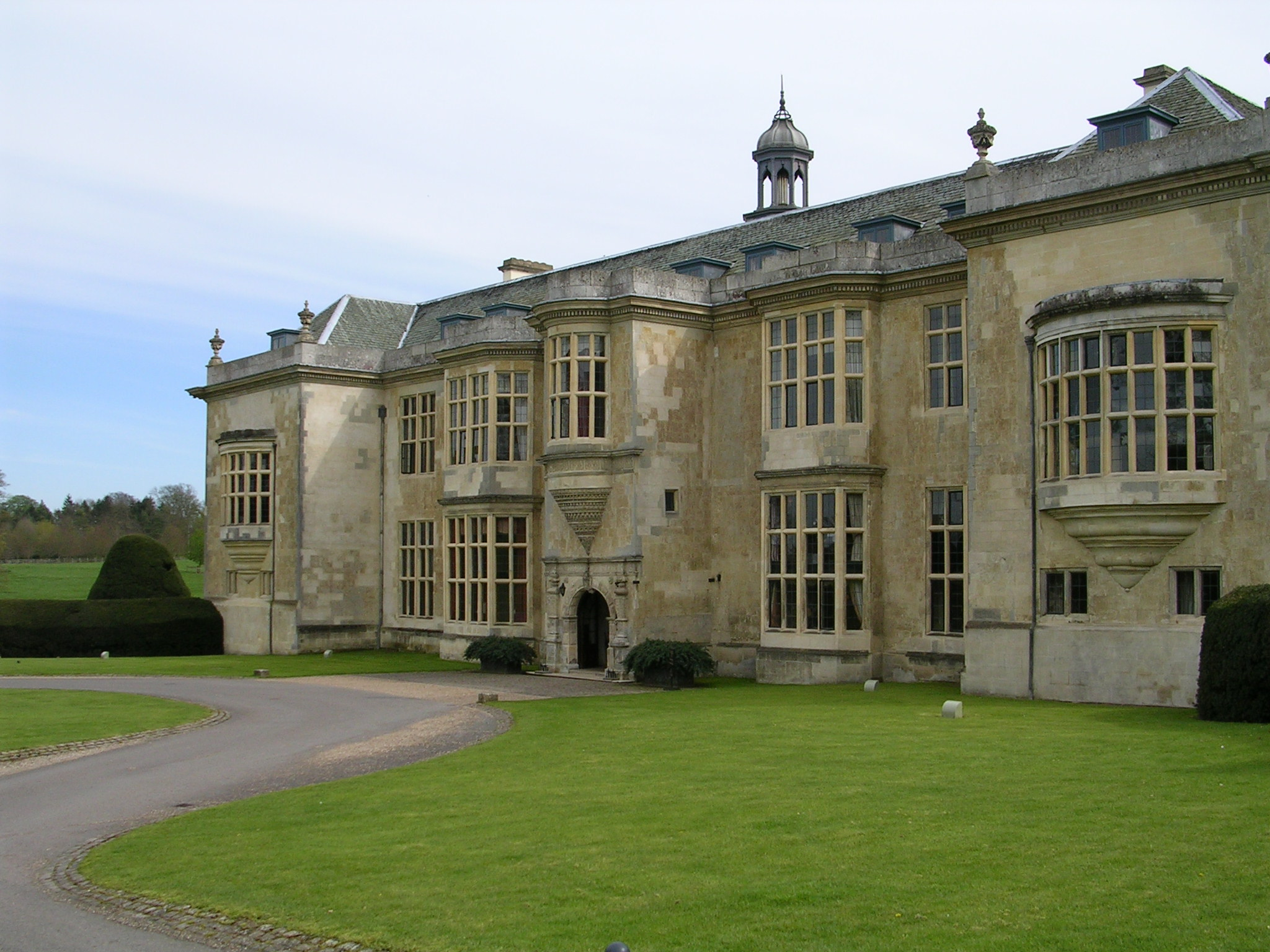
Hartwell House - seat of the Lee family

Lee was the son of Sir Thomas Lee, 1st Baronet of Hartwell and his wife Anne Davis, daughter of Sir John Davis of Pangborne, Berkshire.

In 1689, Lee was elected Member of Parliament for Aylesbury and held the seat until 1699. He succeeded to the baronetcy of Hartwell on the death of his father in 1691. Following his return at the general election in July 1698, his election was declared void on 7 February 1699.

Lee married Alice Hopkins, daughter of Thomas Hopkins a merchant of London. His eldest son Thomas succeeded to the baronetcy, his second son William became Lord Chief Justice, his third son John and his fifth son George became MPs.

Parliament of England
Preceded by Sir William Egerton; Richard Anderson	Member of Parliament for Aylesbury; 1689–1699; With: Richard Beke 1689–90; Sir Thomas Lee, 1st Bt 1690–91; Simon Mayne 1691–95; James Herbert from 1695	Succeeded by James Herbert; Robert Dormer
Preceded by Robert Dormer; James Herbert	Member of Parliament for Aylesbury; 1701 – July 1702; With: James Herbert	Succeeded by James Herbert; Sir John Pakington, Bt
Baronetage of England
Preceded by Thomas Lee	Baronet (of Hartwell); 1691–1702	Succeeded by Thomas Lee
