= Richard More (died 1635) =

English politician

Richard More (died 1635) of Cuddington, Buckinghamshire, was an English politician.

He was the son and heir of William More of Totternhoe, Beds. More entered the Middle Temple from New Inn in July 1586 and was called to the bar in 1594.

== Career ==
He was a Member (MP) of the Parliament of England for Aylesbury in 1601. His selection probably resulted from a connection to the Pakingtons, who held the manor and may have been through More's link with the Winters of Hodington, Worcestershire. He settled in Aylesbury. In 1616 he became a Bencher and a Master in Chancery extraordinary. He was knighted at Greenwich in June 1619. By 1621 he was living at Cuddington, Buckinghamshire.

He died around June 1635. Nothing is known of his marriage, but he had two sons Richard and William who followed him to the Middle Temple.
