= James Herbert (1660–1704) =

English politician

James Herbert (1660–1704), of Tythrop House, Kingsey, Buckinghamshire, was an English politician.

Herbert was the son of the Hon. James Herbert and his wife Jane née Spiller. He married Lady Catherine Osborne, the daughter of Thomas Osborne, Earl of Danby on 1 July 1674. They had three sons and four daughters.

== Career ==
He was a Member (MP) of the Parliament of England for Queenborough in the periods 14 April 1677 – 8 January 1681 and 1689–1690, for Westbury from 1685 to 1687, and for Aylesbury in 1695 – 11 November 1704. His election in Aylesbury in 1695 was controversial: he secured a majority of 16 votes over his rival Simon Mayne, but complaints were brought to the House of Commons that unqualified persons had voted while others had been bribed to vote for Herbert. The complaints were not upheld, and Herbert remained the MP for Aylesbury.

Parliament of England
Preceded by William Trenchard; John Ashe	Member of Parliament for Westbury; 1685–1689; With: Richard Lewis	Succeeded by Richard Lewis; Peregrine Bertie
Preceded by Caleb Banks; Sir John Godwin	Member of Parliament for Queenborough; 1689–1690; With: Robert Crawford	Succeeded by Robert Crawford; Sir John Banks, Bt
Preceded by Simon Mayne; Sir Thomas Lee, Bt	Member of Parliament for Aylesbury; 1695–1704; With: Sir Thomas Lee, Bt to 1699; Robert Dormer 1699–1701; Sir Thomas Lee, Bt 1701 – July 1702; Sir John Pakington, Bt July–December 1702; Simon Harcourt from December 1702	Succeeded by Simon Harcourt; Sir Henry Parker, 2nd Bt
