= Thomas Crawley (MP) =

English politician

Thomas Crawley (died 1559), of Elmdon and Wenden Lofts, Essex, was an English politician.

He was a member (MP) of the parliament of England for Aylesbury in 1559.
