= Sir Thomas Lee, 1st Baronet =

English politician

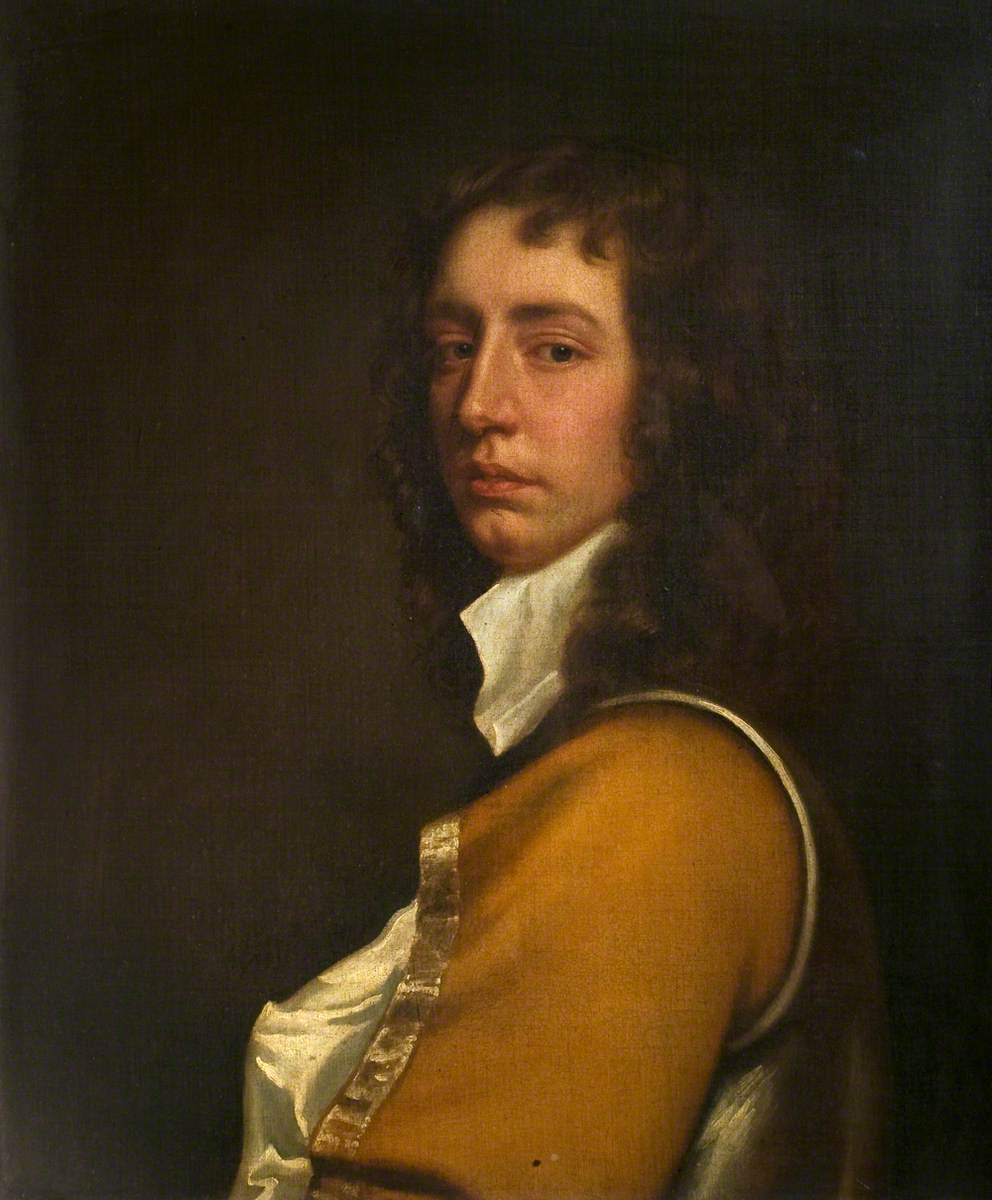
Sir Thomas Lee, 1st Baronet by Peter Lely

Sir Thomas Lee, 1st Baronet (26 May 1635 – 19 February 1691) was an English politician who sat in the House of Commons from 1660 to 1685 and from 1689 to 1691.

Lee was the son of Thomas Lee of Hartwell and his wife Elizabeth Croke, daughter of Sir George Croke. After the death of his father, Lee's mother remarried to Sir Richard Ingoldsby.

In 1660, Lee was elected Member of Parliament for Aylesbury in the Convention Parliament together with his step-father. He was created baronet of Hartwell in 1661. He was re-elected MP for Aylesbury in 1661 for the Cavalier Parliament and held the seat until 1685. In 1689 he was elected MP for Buckinghamshire. He was re-elected MP for Aylesbury in 1690 and held the seat until his death the following year aged 55. He was "much admired for his elegant speeches in the house of commons, where he was a leader in the debates."

Lee married Anne Davis, daughter of Sir John Davis of Pangborne, Berkshire. They had three sons (of whom the eldest Thomas succeeded to the baronetcy and was also an MP), and six daughters.

Parliament of England
Preceded by Not represented in the Restored Rump	Member for Aylesbury; 1660–1685; With: Sir Richard Ingoldsby	Succeeded by Sir William Egerton; Richard Anderson
Preceded by Hon. Thomas Wharton; Viscount Brackley	Member of Parliament for Buckinghamshire; 1689–1690; With: Hon. Thomas Wharton	Succeeded by Hon. Thomas Wharton; Richard Hampden
Preceded by Sir Thomas Lee, 2nd Baronet; Richard Beke	Member for Aylesbury; 1690–1691; With: Sir Thomas Lee, 2nd Baronet	Succeeded by Sir Thomas Lee, 2nd Baronet; Simon Mayne
Baronetage of England
New creation	Baronet (of Hartwell); 1660–1691	Succeeded by Thomas Lee
