= William Smith (MP for Aylesbury) =

English politician

Sir William Smith (Jane 1568–1620), of Blackfriars and The Strand, London and Whadborough, Leicestershire; later of Hammersmith, Middlesex and Lower Cumberloe Green, Hertfordshire, was an English politician.

He was a member (MP) of the parliament of England for Aylesbury in 1604.
