= Robert Abraham (architect) =

English surveyor and architect (1773–1850)

Robert Abraham (1773–1850) was an English building surveyor and later architect in London. He was the son of a builder and was educated as a surveyor as a pupil of James Bowen. He turned to architecture after 1818, and was chiefly employed by the leading Roman Catholic families in England, including the Duke of Norfolk and the Earl of Shrewsbury.

He was respected by his patrons principally for his reliability, but he was competent in the various styles fashionable at the period. He was married to Eliza Brown (died 1818), an accomplished flower-painter, and their son H. R. Abraham succeeded to his practice when he died on 11 December 1850. His eldest daughter (Ellinor Mary) married Richard Bethell, Lord Westbury, who served as Lord Chancellor in 1861-1865, their daughter was the writer Augusta Bethell. Another daughter (Louisa Sarah) married John Bethell.

Among Abraham's students was the architect James Lockyer who went on to form his own successful London practice.

== List of works ==
- Wealdstone (Middlesex): Kenton Lane Farm, new buildings for William Loudon, ca. 1808; demolished
- Pinner (Middlesex): Woodhall Farm, remodelling for William Loudon, ca. 1808-1809
- Arundel Castle (Sussex): completed rebuilding of east wing (begun by James Teasdale) for Charles Howard, the 11th Duke of Norfolk, ca. 1810-1815
- Rise Hall (Yorkshire): attributed alterations, 1815–1820
- Westminster (Middlesex): County Fire Office, Regent Street, 1819; demolished 1924
- Westminster (Middlesex): 176-186 Regent Street, for J. Carbonell, wine merchant, 1820; demolished
- Westminster (Middlesex): Norfolk House, St. James's Square, alterations for Bernard Howard, the 12th Duke of Norfolk, 1819–1820; demolished 1938
- Westminster (Middlesex): Craven Chapel, Foubert's Place, 1821–1822
- Mildenhall (Wiltshire): School, 1823–1824
- Fornham Hall (Suffolk): alterations for Bernard Howard, 12th Duke of Norfolk, ca. 1824; demolished ca. 1951
- Alton Towers (Staffordshire): garden buildings for Charles Talbot, the 15th Earl of Shrewsbury, ca. 1825-1827
- Hayling Island (Hampshire): building development for William Padwick, after 1825
- Westminster (Middlesex): Western Synagogue, St. Alban's Place, 1827–1828
- Tooting (Surrey): National Schools, 1829–1830
- Worksop Manor (Nottinghamshire): works and gardener's cottage for the Earl of Surrey (who was Henry Howard, the 13th Duke of Norfolk), ca. 1830
- Tothill Fields Bridewell, Westminster (Middlesex), 1830–1834; demolished 1885
- Hull (Yorkshire): School of Medicine, Kingston Square, 1833
- Harlow (Essex): Fawbert and Barnard's School, 1836
- Westminster (Middlesex): Oxford Street, houses on the Berners estate, 1836
- Thame Park (Oxfordshire): restoration of medieval chapel for Baroness Wenman, 1836
- Arundel (Sussex): Town Hall, for Bernard Howard, the 12th Duke of Norfolk, 1836
- Arundel (Sussex): Trinity Congregational Church, Tarrant Street, 1836–1838
- London: College of Arms, Queen Victoria Street, interior of the Record Room, 1842–1844
- Cheltenham (Gloucestershire): Unitarian Church, Bayshill Road, 1844
