= Alexandra Hospital for Children with Hip Disease =

Children's hospital in London, England

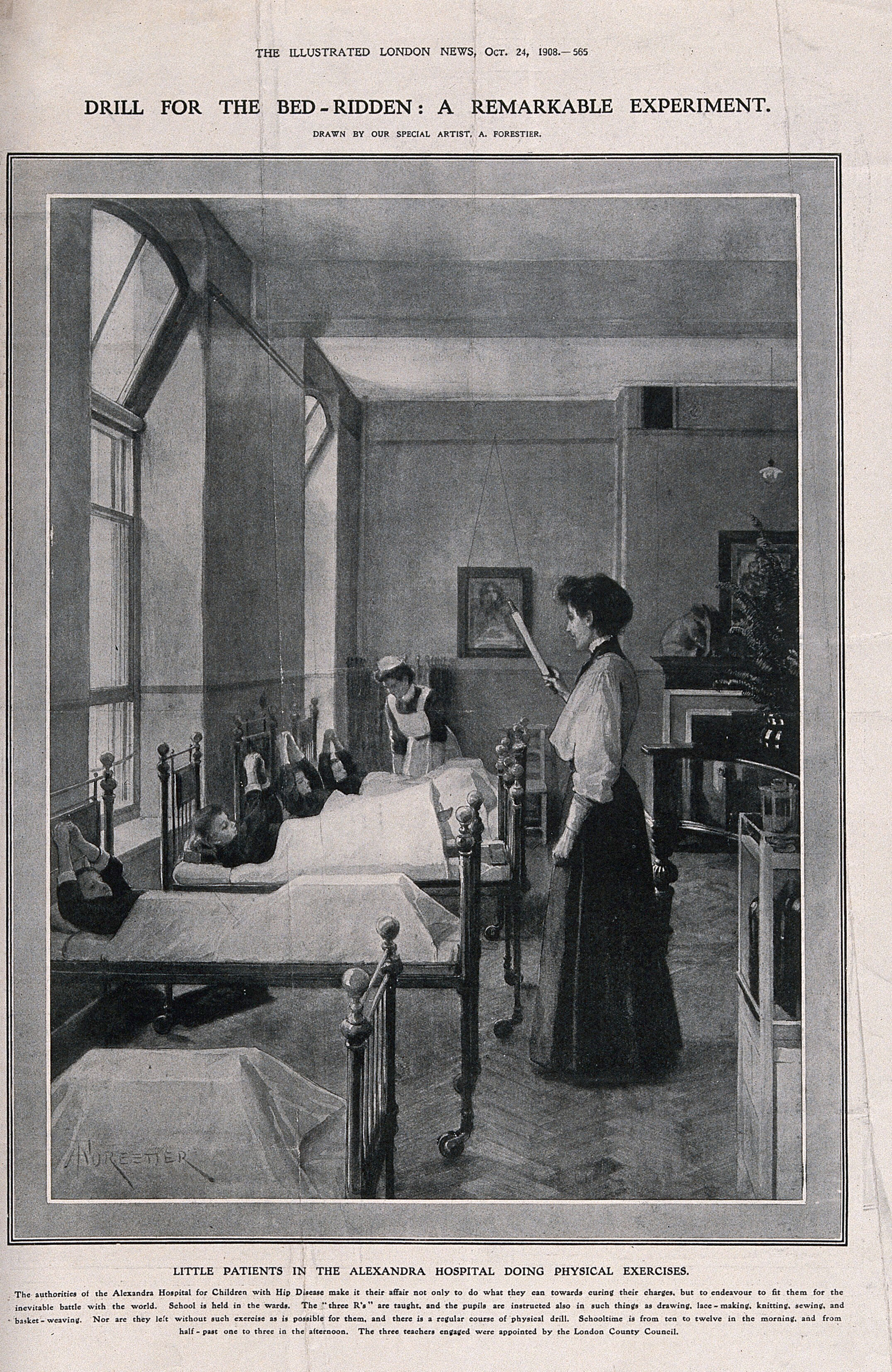
'Drill for the bed-ridden' - image of children in beds being given instruction in physical exercise, from The Illustrated London News, 1908

The Alexandra Hospital was a children's hospital in London, England, founded in 1867. It was founded by Catherine Jane Wood and Miss Perceval, two nurses from Great Ormond Street Hospital, with a group of other women, specifically to care for children with tubercular hip disease (tuberculous arthritis), then a common childhood condition. Tubercular hip disease, or tuberculous arthritis, a form of musculoskeletal TB, was a common disease at this time. It causes pain and stiffness, particularly in large joints such as the hip or knee, and can spread to the bones when it develops in childhood. This can cause long-term problems, including recurrences of the disease in adulthood.

It was the first hospital in London to be founded by nurses.

== Foundation ==
The hospital opened as the 'House of Relief for Children with Chronic Diseases of the Joints' in 1867 in a house at 19 Queen Square, Bloomsbury, London. In 1870 the hospital was renamed as the 'Hospital for Hip Diseases in Children', and by 1881 the name had again been changed to the 'Alexandra Hospital for Children with Hip Disease', named in honour of its patron Princess Alexandra of Denmark. The hospital was extended and then rebuilt during the course of the late 19th century, and built a network of convalescent homes across southern England for the children that it treated. It moved again in 1920 from its central London location to Swanley in Kent. In 1940 the hospital moved again, to Stockwood Park, near Luton in Bedfordshire.

Many young patients were admitted for long-term stays of months or even years, much of which might be spent lying prone in bed, so the education and entertainment of the children, alongside a limited exercise programme was a key part of the hospital regime. With rates of TB in the general UK population falling by the 1950s, and the BCG vaccine against tuberculosis introduced as part of the vaccination regime in UK schools in 1953, demand for the hospital decreased, and the hospital was closed by the Ministry of Health in 1958.

== Expansion and moves ==
The demand for the hospital's beds was such that within five years of its opening, the neighbouring property at 18 Queen Square was purchased in 1872 to provide additional accommodation, followed by 17 Queen Square the following year. Further properties in Queen Square Place were purchased in the subsequent years, and by 1897 the Alexandra Hospital had sixty-eight beds. However, the buildings in which the hospital was accommodated were dilapidated and unsanitary, and in 1898 a decision was taken to re-build. The hospital took temporary accommodation at 34 Guilford Street, Russell Square, London whilst the rebuilding took place. The new hospital buildings, named as 'Alexandra House' opened on 20 July 1899. In 1902, its annual meeting featured and appeal for funds, given a decrease in contributions of hundreds of pounds.

The Alexandra Hospital also had convalescent homes at Helen Branch Hospital, Bournemouth, Hampshire (1874–1993); Wash Well Home, Painswick, Gloucestershire (1893–1914); and Clandon Branch Hospital, East Clandon, Surrey (1903–1936).

The hospital had a longstanding association with St Bartholomew's Hospital from its earliest days, and many of its medical staff, including Sir Thomas Smith and William Girling Ball, served both institutions. In 1920, with further expansion space required, the Alexandra Hospital moved from its central London location to the Kettlewell Home in Swanley, Kent, the site of St Bartholomew's Hospital's convalescent home. The Queen's Square premises was later occupied by the National Hospital. The link between the two hospitals was strengthened further when, on 3 November 1922, the hospitals amalgamated. After the amalgamation the hospital's Committee of Management was renamed the Committee of the Alexandra Hospital and Kettlewell Home.

In 1940, the Alexandra Hospital moved for the final time, to Stockwood Park, a former stately home near Luton, Bedfordshire, a property on lease from Luton Borough Council. The child patients were transferred by converted buses from the Swanley site, which was considered too dangerous due to its proximity to London during the Blitz. Although initially a temporary measure, the hospital remained at that site following the end of the war until its eventual closure. Another move, to Nyn Park in Hertfordshire, was proposed in the 1950s but never happened, and in 1958 the Ministry of Health closed the Alexandra Hospital.

== Naming debates ==
The hospital changed its name several times during its first fifteen years of existence, from the 'House of Relief for Children with Chronic Diseases of the Joints' to the 'Hospital for Hip Diseases in Children', and then again to the 'Alexandra Hospital for Children with Hip Disease'. One reason behind the changes was discussed because of some opposition to the concept of specialist hospitals in the medical press of the time. Sir James Paget, Surgeon to St Bartholomew's Hospital and Surgeon Extraordinary to Queen Victoria, wrote several letters to the hospital on the matter of its naming, in which he welcomed the hospital for meeting an unmet medical need, but expressed his opinion that specialist hospitals gave an opportunity for professional wrongdoing.

After settling on the 'Alexandra Hospital for Children with Hip Disease', the name stayed with the hospital for the rest of its existence. Despite the specificity of the name, tuberculous arthritis of the knee and other bones and joints were also treated there, alongside hip disease.

== Patient experience and funding ==
As a voluntary hospital, the Alexandra Hospital was dependent on subscriptions and donations to cover its running costs. Early fundraising materials often told stories of life on the wards, appealing to the sympathies of potential donors, by focusing on the plight of the children suffering with hip disease. Adverts for support noted the hospital's lack of endowments and the fact that the child patients would not usually be eligible for admission at the larger voluntary general hospitals.

Many of the patients were in the hospital long-term, and so normal childhood activities had to be provided. The hospital ran a school for patients, as well as extra-curricular activities including plays, parties and visits. The Scouts and Guides also had packs based at the hospital. Although many children were confined to their beds for weeks or months, angled mirrors above the heads of the hospital beds allowed them to watch entertainment and instruction in the ward.
