= Trinity Congregational Church =

Trinity Congregational Church may refer to:

- Trinity Congregational Church, Arundel
- Trinity Congregational Church, Christchurch
