= Sington =

Sington is a surname. Notable people with the surname include:

- David Sington, British director, producer, screenwriter and author
- Fred Sington (1910–1998), American football and baseball player
- H. S. Sington (1878–1956), British physician and anaesthetist
- Philip Sington (born 1962), British novelist and playwright
