= West Ham Jewish Cemetery =

Jewish cemetery in Newham, London

- Interactive map of West Ham Jewish Cemetery

Details
- Established: 1856
- Location: Buckingham Road, West Ham (London Borough of Newham), London E15 1SP
- Country: England, United Kingdom
- Coordinates: 51.5528°N 0.0123°E – Mausoleum
- Type: Closed (since 2002)
- Owned by: United Synagogue Burial Society
- Website: Official website
- Find a Grave: West Ham Jewish Cemetery

West Ham Jewish Cemetery is a cemetery for Jews in West Ham in the London Borough of Newham, England. It was established in 1856 by the New Synagogue on Great St. Helen's, soon joined by the Great Synagogue in Duke's Place, both of them London congregations. It has been closed to new burials since 2002

There are a number of notable people buried here, in a graveyard visually dominated by the imposing Rothschild Mausoleum. One section contains graves removed to this burial place from the former Hoxton burial ground of the Hambro Synagogue when that site underwent urban redevelopment. The oldest legible tombstone in this section dates from 1794.

== Rothschild Mausoleum ==
The Rothschild Mausoleum is circular, domed, mausoleum built in 1866 by Ferdinand James von Rothschild for his late wife Evelina de Rothschild who died in childbirth at age 27. The architect was Matthew Digby Wyatt. It is fashioned of marble in Renaissance revival style. Nikolaus Pevsner notes the "dome of Eighteenth-century detail on attached Corinthian columns" and praises the ironwork and stone carving, calling it worthy of "the attention of the student of mid-Victorian detail."

== Vandalism ==
In 2005 a number of monuments were destroyed and graves desecrated in what the police described as an attack by anti-Semitic vandals. The doors of the mausoleum were pounded with heavy iron bars until they were bashed in, then they were torn from the building.

== Notable burials ==
- Evelina de Rothschild (1839–1866), socialite
- Ferdinand James von Rothschild (1839–1898)
- Sir David Salomons, 1st Baronet (1797–1873), a leading figure in the 19th-century struggle for Jewish emancipation in the United Kingdom. He was the first Jewish Sheriff of the City of London and Lord Mayor of London.
- Philip Salomons (1796–1867), financier and High Sheriff of Sussex.

== War graves ==
The cemetery has five Commonwealth service war graves, four from World War I and one from World War II. A German soldier (prisoner of war) and two German civilian internees from the former war are also buried here.

== See also ==
- Jewish cemeteries in the London area
- United Synagogue
