= Sir Thomas Bernard, 6th Baronet =

British Liberal Party politician and baronet

Sir Thomas Tyringham Bernard, 6th Baronet (15 September 1791 – 8 May 1883) was a British Liberal Party politician and baronet.

== Biography ==
Bernard was the son of Sir Scrope Bernard-Morland, 4th Baronet and Hannah Morland and was educated at Eton and Christ Church, Oxford. In 1816 he served as High Sheriff of Buckinghamshire.

He was elected at 1857 general election as the Member of Parliament (MP) for Aylesbury. He was re-elected in 1859, and held the seat until he stood down at the 1865 general election.

He succeeded to the Baronetcy in 1876 on the death of his elder brother Francis.

He died in 1883 at age 91 in Chelsea, London. He had married three times, firstly, Sophia Charlotte Williams (daughter of David Williams) in 1819; secondly, Martha Louisa Minshull (daughter of William Minshull) in 1840, and thirdly, Ellen Elwes in 1864. He had no children.

Parliament of the United Kingdom
Preceded by Austen Henry Layard; Richard Bethell	Member of Parliament for Aylesbury; 1857 – 1865; With: Richard Bethell to 1859; Samuel George Smith from 1859	Succeeded by Nathan Rothschild; Samuel George Smith
Baronetage of Great Britain
Preceded by Francis Bernard-Morland	Baronet (of Nettleham); 1876–1883	Extinct
