= Yaser Jabbar =

Orthopaedic surgeon accused of surgical malpractive

Yaser Jabbar is an orthopaedic surgeon. After graduating from St. George's medical school at the University of London in 2004, his surgical training and surgical practice has been predominately based in the United Kingdom. As of January 2024, Jabbar no longer has a licence to practise in the UK, and has been subject to allegations of surgical malpractice with multiple past and ongoing investigations into his surgical practice and professional conduct. As of September 2024, Jabbar is believed to be working in Dubai in the United Arab Emirates.

== Education and professional experience ==
Jabbar gained his primary medical qualification from St. George's University of London in 2004. He received provisional registration with the General Medical Council (GMC) in July 2004, extended to full registration in August 2005, allowing him to practise medicine in the United Kingdom.

Jabbar held a position as a junior doctor in Oxford but was not accepted onto the orthopaedic training scheme. He trained in orthopaedic surgery at hospitals in London, with further training at the University of Cardiff where he completed an MSc in Orthopaedic Engineering, before working for a year at the Royal Children's Hospital in Melbourne and The Children's Hospital at Westmead, Sydney. On returning to the UK, Jabbar worked at the Chelsea and Westminster Hospital NHS Foundation Trust and in December 2014, Jabbar received registration on the GMC's Specialist Registrar, as a consultant in trauma and orthopaedic surgery.

From 2017 until October 2022, Jabber worked as a consultant paediatric orthopaedic surgeon at the Great Ormond Street Hospital, whilst also working privately at the Portland Hospital in London. In addition to his orthopaedic work, Jabber also worked with Interventional radiology to treat children who were born with vascular anomalies.

== Investigations into surgical malpractice ==
In 2020 Rob Hill, a surgeon at Great Ormond Street Hospital complained to Dr Allan Goldman, the then head of the service, about Jabbar's work. Hill subsequently wrote a report with his concerns and submitted to the trust in June 2020, but no action was taken. During the same time, a Serious Incident investigation was carried out for a parent who claimed that Jabbar had lied to them about a surgery he performed on their child's elbow. The trust later claimed that a single report suggested a one off serious incident rather than a broader pattern of misconduct.

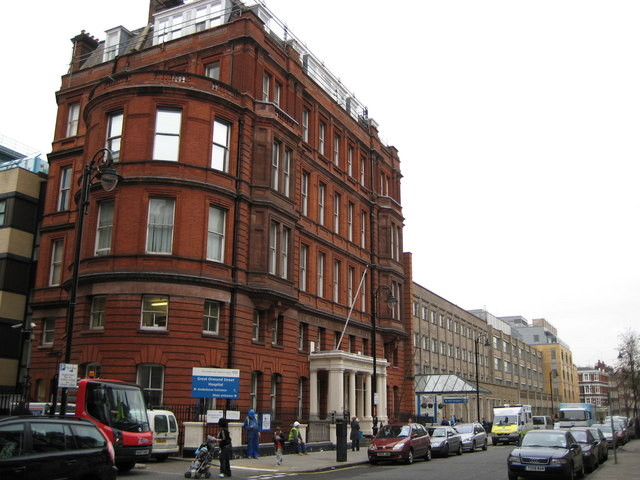
A photo of Great Ormond Street Hospital

In 2021 Sarah McMahon, a consultant at the hospital, began seeing Jabbar's patients while Jabbar was on leave. McMahon was alarmed by the care that the patients had received and raised concerns with the trust. She suggested that an external review be held but management failed to address her concerns and allowed Jabbar to keep practising. Discussing the situation with her MP later, she said “I was effectively told to keep quiet and concentrate on my own patients.” Jabbar submitted counterclaims against McMahon but management failed to share the details of those counter complaints until October 2024. The hospital found Jabbar's complaints unfounded. McMahon's MP Meg Hillier raised McMahon's case in parliament in October 2024. Hillier was critical of the lack of support for whistleblowers and shared how McMahon had been threatened with disciplinary action and excluded in work after she whistleblew on Jabbar. Despite McMahon and Hill's complaints, Great Ormond Street Hospital claimed they were unaware of any concerns until 2022.

In September 2022, whilst still working with children at the Great Ormond Street Hospital, Jabbar was placed on eleven months of unpaid sabbatical leave while the Royal College of Surgeons began a review into Jabbar's surgical practice at the hospital. Jabbar resigned from his post at the hospital on 12 June 2023. The Royal College of Surgeons completed their review in October 2023, making 122 recommendations on improvements to the orthopaedic service. On January 4 2024 Jabbar had multiple conditions applied to his work by the GMC. This included requiring a clinical supervisor to oversee his work at all times and ensuring all his employers are aware of his GMC restrictions. On January 8 Jabbar left the GMC register and is no longer licensed to practise in the UK.

In September 2024, The Times newspaper obtained a copy of the Royal College of Surgeons report and published details of the investigation's findings. The investigation found Jabbar had exhibited “unacceptable and unprofessional behaviour”. His record-keeping was poor and assessments of children before surgery were unacceptable and he carried out operations for which he had not sought proper consent. It also concluded that children were also subjected to surgery that had no clear benefits or justification. Accusations were made that Jabbar would alter clinical records after surgery and dismissed concerns raised about the post-surgical recovery of children. According to the report, “the review team heard of serious complications … with staff reportedly seeing more amputations in recent times than they ever had within the service” and that some staff working with Jabbar “would not wish for their friends and family to be operated on” by him. The report also concluded that Jabbar "hid his complications and he didn’t learn from them. So they kept happening.” In a review of one child's care, the report concluded surgery by Jabbar was “incorrect and unsuitable”. It said Jabbar “demonstrated a lack of understanding of the principles of deformity correction surgery, in addition to a lack of insight”.

Great Ormond Street Hospital released a redacted version of the Royal College of Surgeons report in their October 2024 trust board papers.

=== Great Ormond Street Hospital Orthopaedic review ===
The Royal College of Surgeons advised that the Great Ormond Street Hospital review the patient files of around 200 patients of Jabbar. The hospital decided to conduct an independent review of all 789 of Jabbar's patients, this began in February 2024. In September 2024, 39 cases had been reviewed with 22 children having been harmed, and a further 13 were classified as having suffered "severe harm" with potentially lifelong injuries as a result. One child harmed was only four months of age during surgery. At least one child had to have a leg amputation following Jabbar's surgery, with another child at risk of amputation if the work of other surgeons cannot save the limb. In other cases, children have been left with a disparity in leg length by as much as 20 centimetres (7.9 in), with children living with chronic pain even years after surgery and others having to be repeatedly operated on due to muscle damage, nerve injuries and permanent deformities after surgery.

In October 2025 patients and their families received reports of the findings in their individual cases. The full orthopaedic review was publicly published on 29 January 2026. The orthopaedic review found that 94 of Jabber's patients had been caused harmed during their care. Jabbar had performed surgery in 91 of those cases.

The report found that Jabbar had prematurely removed bone fixation devices, pinned bones incorrectly, and made cuts into bones at the wrong level. He had also placed implants in the wrong location and failed to identify serious complications. Some consent forms were found to be missing or incomplete. In some cases the consent form did not match the surgery that was undertaken and Jabber failed to record why the planned surgery had been changed. The review found that many families weren't aware of alternative treatment options or the risks of treatment. Jabber had also failed to record vital information like patient's clinical measurements and planning notes for surgeries. In some instances Jabbar failed to obtain essential imaging before performing surgery.

The orthopaedic review was conducted mainly using patient notes, something that was controversial with families as it had been documented that Jabber's notes were unreliable. Many felt that the medical notes wouldn't cover the daily pain and mental anguish their children dealt with following their discharge from Jabber's care. In one patients case, the individual report that the family were given claimed that their daughter had undergone 6 surgeries but the family claimed she had undergone 10.

Families also were upset with how the review categorised perceived harm of patients, with many feeling the findings of "moderate harm" weren't appropriate for the harm their children experienced. Cases that were classed as "moderate harm" included a girl who underwent multiple failed surgeries before Jabbar eventually amputated her leg. In another case, a 16-year-old was left with chronic pain after Jabbar performed nonconsensual surgery on his ankle, despite previously telling the patient that the surgery would be on his knee. The review initially contained assesements of psychological harm that the patients had suffered but following negative feedback from patients and their families, the orthopaedic review stopped assessing potential psychological harm. The final report released in January 2025 rated psychological harm as "Unable to Determine".

Following the release of the orthopaedic review, NHS England said they would begin their own review into the hospital in February 2026. The review will look at the culture and management of the hospital as well as how complaints about Jabbar were handled.

=== Criticism of Great Ormond Street Hospital ===
Beyond Jabbar's behaviour and care, the Royal College of Surgeons report was highly critical of the working environment at the hospital, with staff and patients feeling their concerns were not listened to, and the report accusing the hospital of being run like a "political organisation". Their investigation found that a list of harmed patients had previously been handed to senior managers by whistleblowers but no action was taken. They also found that Junior Doctors at the hospital were uncooperative during the investigation, refusing to respond to letters, or making appointments with the review team but failing to attend. The Royal College had asked for the hospital's complaints data during their investigation but was never provided with it and was never given an explanation as to why this data had not been provided to them.

The father of one child said "we tried to raise our concerns repeatedly through the official complaints procedure, and I copied the clinical director into many emails, but heard nothing back." He described the initial investigation as feeling like everything was being "brushed under the carpet," which he found "very upsetting." One patient's case was previously reviewed with the hospital finding that Jabbar’s surgical technique was satisfactory. But following a later review, after the Royal College of Surgeons investigation, the hospital found Jabbar had caused the patient harm and didn't consider alternative treatment plans.

One family raised concerns about Jabbar to one of his colleges after Jabbar used a different frame in a surgery than the one that they were told would be used. They attempted to raise concerns with one of Jabbar's colleges, who told them Jabbar was the "frame guy" and that he knew what he was doing. They accused the hospital of failing their duty of care and having a culture that refused to acknowledge that it was possible to make mistakes.
