= Augusta Bethell =

British writer and translator (1838–1931)

The Honourable Augusta Bethell
- Born: 3 August 1838; Marylebone, London, England
- Died: 20 December 1931 (aged 93); Daventry, England
- Occupations: Writer, translator
- Spouse(s): Henry Parker (m. 1874; died 1882) Thomas Nash (m. 1890; died 1921)
- Parent(s): Richard Bethell, 1st Baron Westbury (father); Ellinor Mary Abraham (mother)
- Writing career
- Period: 19th century
- Genre: Children's literature

Augusta Bethell (3 August 1838 – 20 December 1931) was a British 19th century writer and translator. She was the daughter of the Richard Bethell, 1st Baron Westbury. She published several children's books during her long career.

== Personal life ==
Augusta Bethell was born in Marylebone as the daughter of Richard Bethell, 1st Baron Westbury and his first wife, Ellinor Abraham, daughter of Robert Abraham. During Bethell's life, she had the affectionate nickname "Gussie".

In the 1860s Edward Lear attempted to marry Bethell (he proposed twice), whom he had known as an old friend. She was probably the only woman that Lear seriously thought of marrying; she was passing through Nice on her way to Italy and stopped for a couple of days to visit Lear. He was quite hesitant to ask her at first due to his disability. Bethell's sister discouraged Lear by saying "She's happy enough." The biographer of Edward Lear, Peter Levi wrote "I am not really sure why Gussie Bethell refused to marry him." However Bethell was 26 years his junior, which he thought has something to do with it. He wrote several letters to Bethell. After this they decided to just be friends.

Bethell hated England, wished she were away from England, where the weather was "dull & wretched". Bethell made friends with John Gibson and regularly wrote to him. She wished she was with him in Rome and all his other Roman friends.

She firstly married, Henry Charles Adamson Parker (1843–1882) in 1874, secondly Thomas Arthur Nash, barrister (1850–1921) in 1890. She survived both of her husbands.

In 1881 she lived at 58 Regency Square in Brighton, which had 20 bedrooms. It has now been transformed into a hotel named "Queensbury Hotel".

On 20 December 1931 aged 93, Bethell died in Daventry.

== Career ==
Bethell often published books for children and rarely did romance books. Illustrator Edward Whymper illustrated with Bethell on the book Helen in Switzerland.

Her published books show as Hon. Mrs. Adamson Parker (Hon. Augusta Bethell).

== Published works ==
- Millicent and her Cousins (Griffith and Farran 1873) ASIN B01ABU4X0Q
- Among the Fairies ISBN 9781333623968
- The Sea-Gull ISBN 9781331707929
- Helen in Switzerland : a tale for young people (Illustrated by Edward Whymper) (Griffith and Farran 1867) ISBN 978-1164667063
- Echoes Of An Old Bell ISBN 978-1164627630
- Feathers And Fairies ISBN 978-1164644354
- A Village Maiden ISBN 978-1354574737
- Maud Latimer
- Love and Life in Norway ISBN 978-1271213351
