= Richard Bethell, 1st Baron Westbury =

Lord High Chancellor of Great Britain from 1861 to 1865

The Right Honourable The Lord Westbury PC
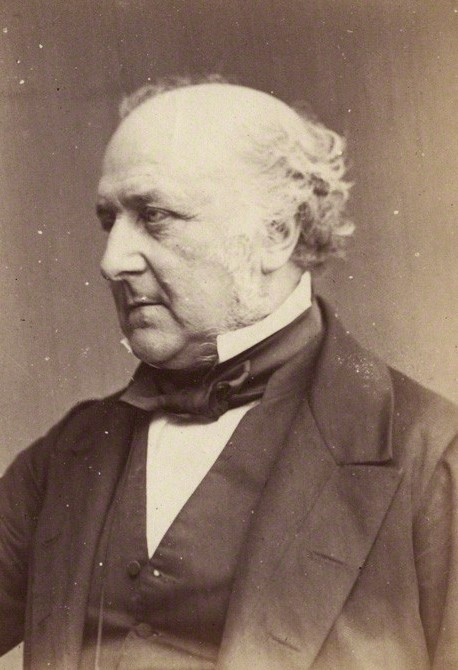

Lord Chancellor
- In office 26 June 1861 – 7 July 1865
- Monarch: Victoria
- Prime Minister: The Viscount Palmerston
- Preceded by: The Lord Campbell
- Succeeded by: The Lord Cranworth

Personal details
- Born: 30 June 1800 Bradford on Avon, Wiltshire
- Died: 20 July 1873 (aged 73) Lancaster Gate, London
- Party: Liberal
- Spouses: Ellinor Abraham (m. 1823; died 1863) Eleanor Tennant (m. 1873)
- Children: 8, including Augusta
- Education: Wadham College, Oxford

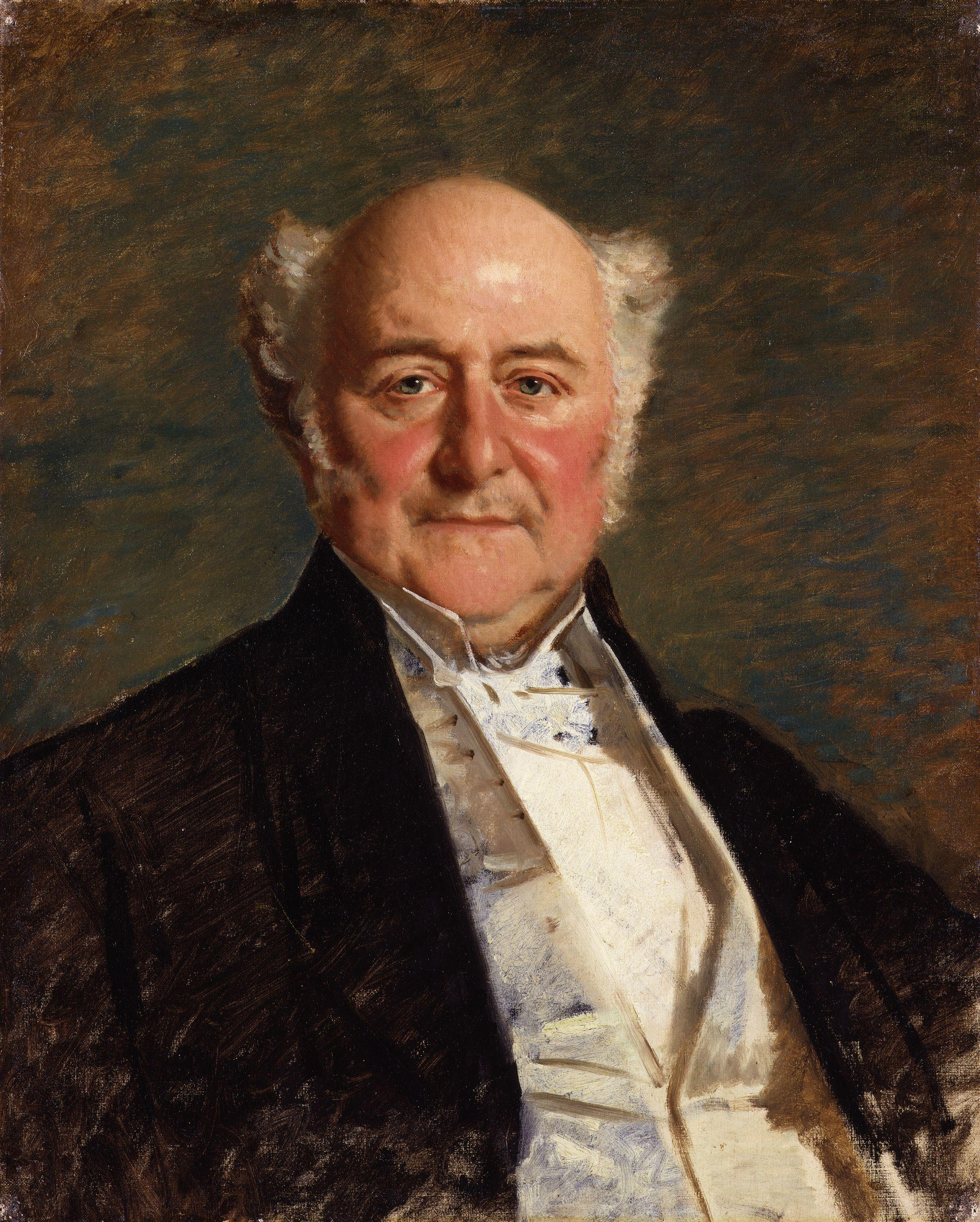
Lord Westbury by Michele Gordigiani.

Richard Bethell, 1st Baron Westbury, PC (30 June 1800 – 20 July 1873) was a British lawyer, judge and Liberal politician. He served as Lord High Chancellor of Great Britain between 1861 and 1865. He was knighted in 1852 and raised to the peerage in 1861.

== Background and education ==
Born at Bradford on Avon, in Wiltshire, he was the eldest son of the physician Richard Bethell of Bristol and Jane (née Baverstock). He was from an old Welsh family originally named Ap Ithel. His younger brother was John Bethell.

He was educated in Bath and Bristol before attending Wadham College, Oxford at only 14 years old. He received a scholarship the next year. He took first-class honours in classics and second class in mathematics, and he graduated as a Bachelor of Arts in 1818 and was elected a fellow of his college. In 1823, Bethell was called to the bar at the Middle Temple.

== Career ==
Westbury was made a Queen's Counsel in 1840 was appointed Vice-Chancellor of the County Palatine of Lancaster in 1851. His most important public service was the reform of the then existing mode of legal education, a reform which ensured that students before call to the bar should have at least some acquaintance with the elements of the subject which they were to profess.

In 1847, he ran unsuccessfully for Parliament; contesting Shaftesbury, he lost to Whig politician Richard Brinsley Sheridan. He was successful in his second attempt in 1851, when he was elected for Aylesbury. Attaching himself to the liberals, he became Solicitor General in 1852, on which occasion he was made a Knight Bachelor.

In 1854, Westbury was appointed to the Royal Commission for Consolidating the Statute Law, a royal commission to consolidate existing statutes and enactments of English law.

Westbury was nominated Attorney-General in 1856 and again in 1859, serving both times for two years. He represented Wolverhampton from 1859 to 1861.

On 26 June 1861, on the death of Lord Campbell, he was appointed Lord Chancellor and raised to the peerage as Baron Westbury, of Westbury, in the County of Wiltshire. Owing to the reception by parliament of reports of committees nominated to consider the circumstances of certain appointments in the Leeds Bankruptcy Court, as well as the granting a pension to a Mr Leonard Edmunds, a clerk in the patent office, and a clerk of the parliaments, the Lord Chancellor felt it incumbent upon him to resign his office, which he accordingly did on 5 July 1865, and was succeeded by Robert Rolfe, 1st Baron Cranworth. After his resignation he continued to take part in the judicial sittings of the House of Lords and the Privy Council until his death. In 1872 he was appointed arbitrator under the European Assurance Society Act 1872.

== Character ==
Perhaps the best known of his decisions was the judgment delivering the opinion of the judicial committee of the privy council in 1863 against the heretical character of certain extracts from the well-known publication Essays and Reviews.

His principal legislative achievements were the passing of the Matrimonial Causes Act 1857, and of the Land Registry Act 1862 (generally known as Lord Westbury's Act), the latter of which in practice proved a failure. What chiefly distinguished Lord Westbury was the possession of a certain sarcastic humour; and numerous are the stories, authentic and apocryphal, of its exercise. In fact, he and Sir William Henry Maule filled a position analogous to that of Sydney Smith, convenient names to whom good things may be attributed.

== Family ==
Lord Westbury married Ellinor Mary, daughter of Robert Abraham, in 1825. His younger brother John married another daughter of Abraham, Louisa Sarah, in 1833. They had four sons and four daughters:

- Ellen (1826–1880)
- Eliza (1828–1916)
- Richard Augustus, 2nd Baron (1830–1875)
- Slingsby (1831–1896)
- Arthur Howard (1833–1834)
- Emma Louisa (1835–1877)
- Augusta (1839–1931)
- Walter John (1842–1907)

After Ellinor Mary's death in March 1863, Richard Bethell married Eleanor Margaret, daughter of Henry Tennant, in January 1873. After an illness, Westbury died six months later on 20 July 1873, within a day of the death of Bishop Samuel Wilberforce, his special antagonist in debate. He was buried in the Great Northern Cemetery (now the New Southgate Cemetery). He was succeeded in the barony by his son from his first marriage, Richard, who committed suicide two years later. Lady Westbury died in December 1894.

Lord Westbury's daughter Augusta Bethell was a children's author and translator who was sought in marriage by Edward Lear before marrying Henry Charles Adamson Parker and then barrister Thomas Arthur Nash.

Parliament of the United Kingdom
Preceded by Quintin Dick; Frederick Calvert	Member of Parliament for Aylesbury; 1851 – 1859; With: Quintin Dick 1851–1852; Austen Henry Layard 1852–1857; Thomas Tyringham Bernard 1857–1859	Succeeded by Thomas Tyringham Bernard; Samuel George Smith
Preceded by Charles Pelham Villiers; Thomas Thornely	Member of Parliament for Wolverhampton; 1859–1861; With: Charles Pelham Villiers	Succeeded by Charles Pelham Villiers; Thomas Matthias Weguelin
Legal offices
Preceded by Sir Fitzroy Kelly	Solicitor General for England and Wales; 1852–1856	Succeeded by James Archibald Stuart-Wortley
Preceded by Sir Alexander Cockburn, 12th Bt	Attorney General for England and Wales; 1856–1858	Succeeded by Sir Fitzroy Kelly
Preceded by Sir Fitzroy Kelly	Attorney General for England and Wales; 1859–1861	Succeeded by Sir William Atherton
Political offices
Preceded by The Lord Campbell	Lord High Chancellor of Great Britain; 1861–1865	Succeeded by The Lord Cranworth
Peerage of the United Kingdom
New creation	Baron Westbury; 1861–1873	Succeeded by Richard Bethell
