= Evelina de Rothschild =

English socialite

- Evelina de Rothschild, 1865
- Born: Evelina Gertrude de Rothschild; 25 August 1839; London, England
- Died: 4 December 1866 (aged 27); London, England
- Spouse: Ferdinand de Rothschild (m. 1865)
- Parent(s): Lionel de Rothschild and Charlotte von Rothschild

Evelina Gertrude de Rothschild (25 August 1839 – 4 December 1866) was an English socialite and a member of the Rothschild banking family of England.

== Biography ==
Evelina de Rothschild was the daughter of Baron Lionel de Rothschild, the first openly unconverted Jew to sit in the British House of Commons. Her mother was Charlotte von Rothschild, a cousin from the Naples branch of the family.

On 7 June 1865, Evelina married her second cousin Ferdinand James von Rothschild of the Austrian branch of the family. Because of her parents' prominent position as one of the wealthiest and most influential families in England, guests at her wedding banquet and ball included Benjamin Disraeli, the ambassadors from Austria and France, and Prince George, Duke of Cambridge.

Following a lengthy honeymoon across Europe, Evelina and her husband settled into a home at 143 Piccadilly in London near her parents. She died on 4 December 1866 after giving birth to their first child, a stillborn son. She is buried at the Rothschild Mausoleum in the Jewish Cemetery at West Ham.

== Commemoration ==
In her memory, her husband built, equipped, and endowed the Evelina Hospital for Sick Children in Southwark, one of the neglected and poorest districts of London. Her father Lionel assumed sponsorship, in 1867, of the first school for girls in Jerusalem, which had opened in 1854 and was later renamed the Evelina de Rothschild School. Her mother, Charlotte, inaugurated the Evelina Prize, awarded at Jewish elementary schools and Jews' College.
