= Nathan Rothschild, 1st Baron Rothschild =

British banker and politician (1840–1915)

The Right Honourable The Lord Rothschild GCVO PC
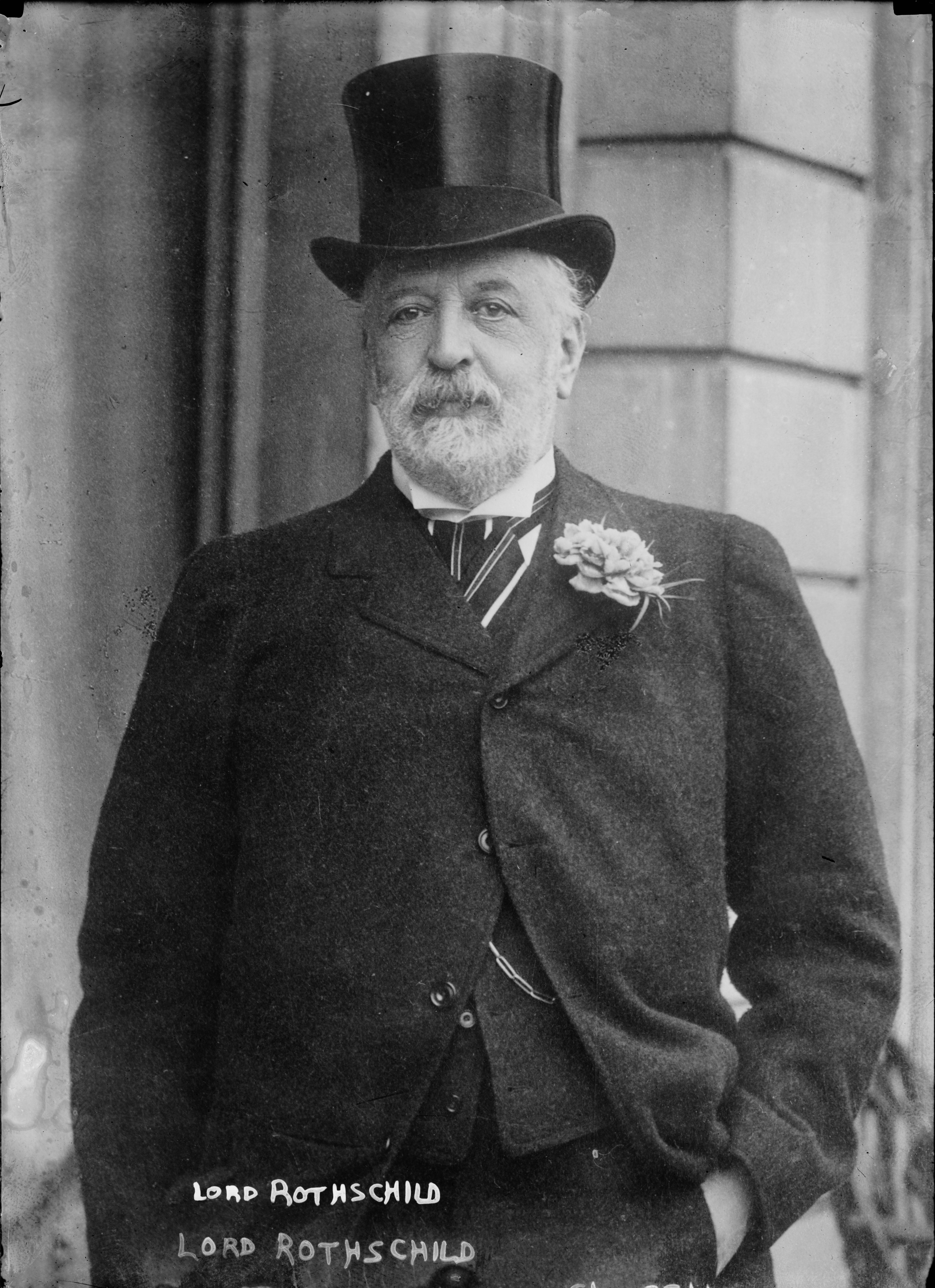

Lord Lieutenant of Buckinghamshire
- In office 1889–1915
- Monarchs: Victoria; Edward VII; George V
- Preceded by: The Duke of Buckingham and Chandos
- Succeeded by: The Marquess of Lincolnshire

Member of Parliament for Aylesbury
- In office 1865–1885 Serving with Samuel George Smith 1865–1880; George W. E. Russell 1880–1885
- Preceded by: Thomas Bernard; Samuel George Smith
- Succeeded by: Ferdinand de Rothschild

Member of the House of Lords
- Lord Temporal
- In office 2 July 1885 – 31 March 1915
- Preceded by: Peerage created
- Succeeded by: The 2nd Baron Rothschild

Personal details
- Born: Nathaniel Mayer Rothschild; 8 November 1840 London, England
- Died: 31 March 1915 (aged 74) London, England
- Resting place: Willesden Jewish Cemetery
- Party: Liberal then Liberal Unionist then Conservative
- Spouse: Emma Louise von Rothschild (m. 1867)
- Children: Walter Rothschild, 2nd Baron Rothschild; Evelina Rothschild-Behrens; Charles Rothschild
- Parent(s): Lionel de Rothschild; Charlotte von Rothschild
- Relatives: Nathan Mayer Rothschild (grandfather); Mayer Amschel Rothschild (great-grandfather)
- Education: Trinity College, Cambridge
- Occupation: Banker

Nathaniel Mayer Rothschild, 1st Baron Rothschild, Baron de Rothschild (8 November 1840 – 31 March 1915), was a British banker and politician from the wealthy international Rothschild family.

== Early life ==
Nathaniel Mayer Rothschild was the eldest son of Baron Lionel de Rothschild and Baroness Charlotte von Rothschild (née von Rothschild). His paternal grandparents were Nathan Mayer Rothschild, after whom he was named, and Hannah Barent-Cohen, daughter of Levy Barent Cohen. His maternal grandparents were Carl Mayer von Rothschild and Adelheid Herz. Through both of his grandfathers, who were brothers, he was the great-grandson of Mayer Amschel Rothschild, founder of the dynasty.

In his youth, Rothschild was a Captain in the Buckinghamshire Yeomanry. He was educated at Trinity College, Cambridge, where he was a friend of the Prince of Wales (later Edward VII), but left without taking a degree.

== Career ==
Rothschild worked as a partner in the London branch of the family bank, N M Rothschild & Sons, and became head of the bank after his father's death in 1879. During his tenure, he also maintained its pre-eminent position in private venture finance and in issuing loans to the governments of the US, Russia and Austria. Following the Rothschilds' funding of the Suez Canal, a close relationship was maintained with Benjamin Disraeli and affairs in Egypt.

Rothschild also funded Cecil Rhodes in the development of the British South Africa Company and the De Beers diamond conglomerate. He later administered Rhodes' estate after Rhodes' death in 1902 and helped to set up the Rhodes Scholarship scheme at the University of Oxford. He was a prominent member of the Round Table movement, created in 1909.

A noted philanthropist, Rothschild was heavily involved with the foundation of the Four Per Cent Industrial Dwellings Company, a model dwellings company whose aim was to provide decent housing, predominantly for the Jews of Spitalfields and Whitechapel. He also served as a trustee of the London Mosque Fund until his death. From 1889 until his death, he was Lord Lieutenant of Buckinghamshire and was well known as an agriculturist.

In the 1902 Coronation Honours list, he was appointed a Privy Counsellor and was sworn a member of the council at Buckingham Palace on 11 August 1902. On the same day, he was appointed to the Royal Victorian Order as a Knight Grand Cross (GCVO).

=== House of Commons ===
From 1865 to 1885, Nathan Rothschild sat in the House of Commons as Liberal Member of Parliament for Aylesbury. His father Lionel had previously been elected for the City of London from 1847 but had been unable to take the obligatory oath until 1858; they were MPs together from 1865 to 1868 and from 1869 to 1874.

=== Baron Rothschild ===
In 1847, his uncle Anthony de Rothschild was created a baronet in the Baronetage of the United Kingdom. As Anthony had no male heirs, upon his death, the Rothschild baronetcy passed by special remainder to his nephew Nathan.

In 1822, his father and uncles were granted the hereditary title of Baron de Rothschild in the Austrian nobility by Emperor Francis I of Austria. In 1838, Queen Victoria authorized his father and his male heirs to use this Austrian title within the United Kingdom. He inherited this Austrian noble title upon the death of his father in 1879.

In 1885, Rothschild became a member of the House of Lords when he was created Baron Rothschild, of Tring in the County of Hertford, in the Peerage of the United Kingdom.

When he was raised to the peerage by Gladstone, Rothschild was the first Jewish member of the House of Lords not to have previously converted to Christianity. (Disraeli had been created Earl of Beaconsfield in 1876, but he was baptised into Anglicanism at age twelve.)

In common with the rest of his family, Rothschild joined the breakaway Liberal Unionist Party, formed in 1886 by Joseph Chamberlain, which ultimately merged into the Conservative Party.

In 1909, he was famously derided by David Lloyd George, then Chancellor of the Exchequer, over his opposition to the People's Budget, when the latter said, at a meeting at the Holborn Restaurant on 24 June that year: "I really think we are having too much Lord Rothschild. Are we to have all ways of reform, financial and social, blocked, simply by a notice-board; 'No Thoroughfare. By Order of Nathaniel Rothschild'?" Rothschild recommended the Lords reject the Parliament Bill, which was, however, passed.

In 1914, after the outbreak of World War I, Rothschild was consulted for economic advice by Lloyd George. At his first invitation to confer at the Treasury, when asked what could be done to raise more money for the war effort, Rothschild reportedly answered: "Tax the rich, and tax them heavily."

== Personal life ==
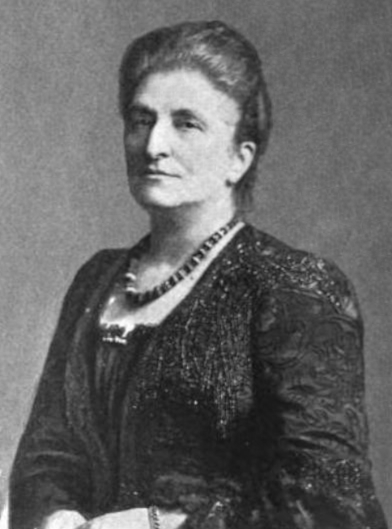
Emma Louise von Rothschild in 1902

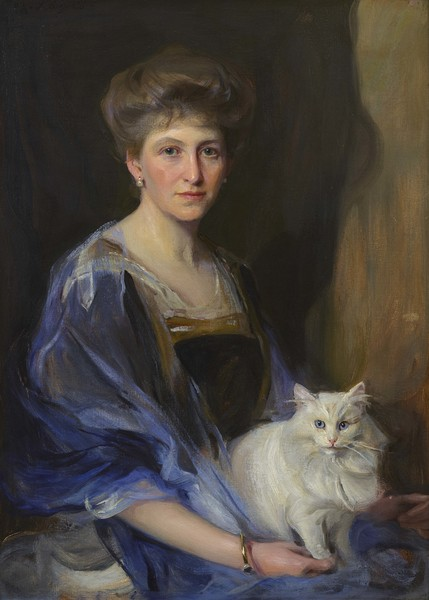
Portrait of his daughter, Evelina, by Philip de László, 1911

On 16 April 1867, he married Emma Louise von Rothschild, a double first cousin (i.e., they shared both sets of grandparents) from the Rothschild banking family of Germany in Frankfurt. They had three children:

- Lionel Walter Rothschild (1868–1937), who never married but had two mistresses, one of whom bore him a daughter.
- Charlotte Louisa Adela Evelina Rothschild (1873–1947), who married Clive Behrens, son of Edward Behrens of Bettisfield Park, Whitchurch, in 1899.
- Nathaniel Charles Rothschild (1877–1923), who married Rózsika Edle von Wertheimstein (1870–1940).

He died in London, five days after an operation, on 31 March 1915 and was buried at Willesden Jewish Cemetery. Following his death, the peerage was inherited by his son, Lionel Walter Rothschild.

== See also ==
- History of the Jews in England
- Rothschild banking family of England

== Sources ==
- Cooper, John (2015). The Unexpected Story of Nathaniel Rothschild. Bloomsbury. ISBN 978-1-4729-1707-2.
- Roth, Cecil (1939). The Magnificent Rothschilds. R. Hale.
- Valynseele, Joseph; Mars, Henri-Claude (2004). Le Sang des Rothschild (in French). Paris: ICC Editions. ISBN 978-2-908003-22-2.

Parliament of the United Kingdom
Preceded by Thomas Bernard; Samuel George Smith	Member of Parliament for Aylesbury two-seat constituency until 1885; 1865–1885; With: Samuel George Smith 1865–1880; George W. E. Russell 1880–1885	Succeeded by Ferdinand de Rothschild
Honorary titles
Preceded by The Duke of Buckingham and Chandos	Lord Lieutenant of Buckinghamshire; 1889–1915	Succeeded by The Marquess of Lincolnshire
Peerage of the United Kingdom
New creation	Baron Rothschild; 1885–1915; Member of the House of Lords (1885–1915)	Succeeded by Walter Rothschild
Baronetage of the United Kingdom
Preceded by Anthony de Rothschild	Baronet of Grosvenor Place; 1876–1915	Succeeded by Walter Rothschild
Austrian nobility
Preceded by Lionel de Rothschild	Baron de Rothschild; 1879–1915	Succeeded by Walter Rothschild
