= Samuel George Smith =

English banker and Conservative Party politician

Arms of Smith: Or, a chevron cotised sable between three demi-griffins couped of the last the two in chief respecting each other

Samuel George Smith (5 June 1822 – 6 July 1900) was an English banker and Conservative Party politician who sat in the House of Commons from 1859 to 1880.

Smith was the grandson of Samuel Smith, Member of Parliament (MP) for Wendover from 1820 to 1832, and the son of Samuel George Smith (1789–1863) and his wife Eugenia Chatfield, daughter of the Rev. Robert Chatfield. He was educated at Rugby School and at Trinity College, Cambridge and became a partner in Smith, Payne & Smiths, bankers of London. He was a J.P. for Hertfordshire.

Samuel George Smith (père), George Robert Smith, and Oswald Augustus Smith, all members of that Lombard Street banking house, were in 1836 among the earliest and heaviest investors in "town acres" of the newly surveyed city of Adelaide, and country land in South Australia.

At the 1859 general election Smith was elected as one of the two MPs for Aylesbury. He held the seat until his defeat at the 1880 general election. He was a general supporter of Benjamin Disraeli's policy.

Smith lived at Sacombe Park, Ware, Hertfordshire. He died unmarried at the age of 78.

Parliament of the United Kingdom
Preceded by Richard Bethell; Thomas Bernard	Member of Parliament for Aylesbury; 1859 – 1880; With: Thomas Bernard to 1865; Nathan Rothschild from 1865	Succeeded by George W. E. Russell; Nathan Rothschild
