= Ferdinand de Rothschild =

British banker and politician (1839–1898)

Baron Ferdinand de Rothschild

Member of Parliament for Aylesbury
- In office 18 July 1885 – 17 December 1898 Serving with George W. E. Russell (July–December 1885)
- Preceded by: Nathan Rothschild
- Succeeded by: Walter Rothschild

Personal details
- Born: 17 December 1839 Paris, France
- Died: 17 December 1898 (aged 59) Waddesdon Manor, Buckinghamshire, England
- Party: Liberal
- Other political affiliations: Liberal Unionist
- Spouse: Evelina de Rothschild (m. 1865; died 1866)
- Children: 1 (stillborn)
- Occupation: Banker

Baron Ferdinand de Rothschild (17 December 1839 – 17 December 1898), also known as Ferdinand James Anselm Freiherr von Rothschild, was a British banker, art collector and politician who was a member of the Rothschild family of bankers. He identified as a Liberal, later Liberal Unionist, and sat as a Member of Parliament in the House of Commons from 1885 to 1898. Ferdinand had a younger sister, Alice, who like her brother was a keen horticulturalist and collector. She inherited Ferdinand's property, Waddesdon Manor, in 1898 after he died and likewise continued the tradition of using the house as a place to keep his collections.

== Life and career ==
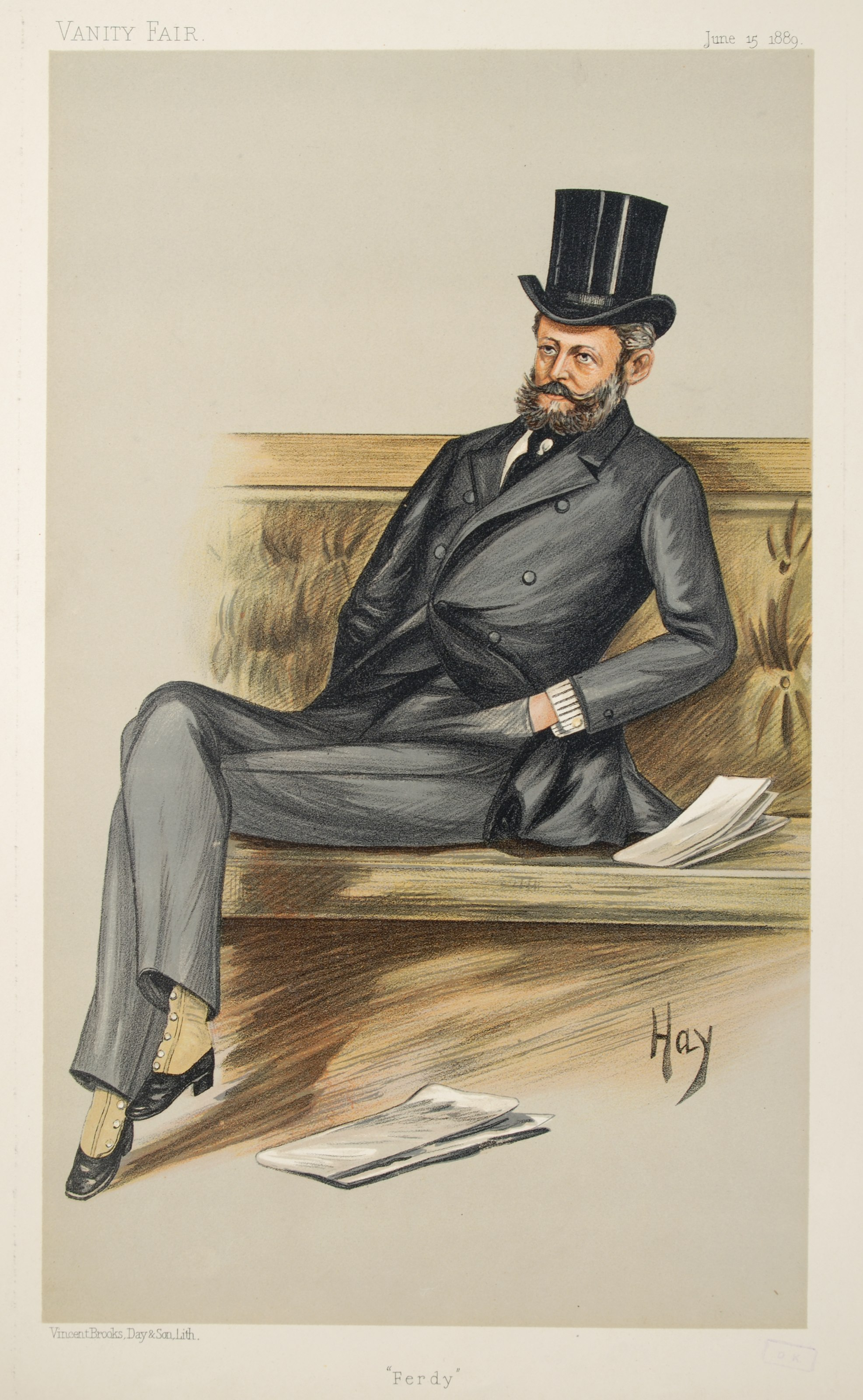
"Ferdy", 1889 Vanity Fair caricature of Baron Ferdinand de Rothschild in the House of Commons

Although Ferdinand de Rothschild was born in Paris in 1839, he was from Vienna and was a member of the Rothschild banking family of Austria. He was the second son of Anselm Salomon Freiherr von Rothschild (1803–1874), a Vienna-based banker, and his English wife Charlotte Nathan Rothschild (1807–1859), daughter of Nathan Mayer Rothschild. Ferdinand's great-grandfather was Mayer Amschel Rothschild. He had the hereditary title of Freiherr (baron) in the Austrian nobility. He was 'Ferdy' to his family and friends.

When Ferdinand became a British subject and moved from Vienna to London, "[he] epitomised the expanding lifestyle of the fourth generation". On 7 June 1865, he married his second cousin Evelina de Rothschild (1839–1866), the daughter of Baron Lionel de Rothschild (1808–1879). On 4 December 1866, their son was stillborn, and Evelina died later the same day. In her memory, Ferdinand built, equipped and endowed the Evelina Hospital for Sick Children in Southwark, south London.

From 1868 to 1875, he became Treasurer of the Jewish Board of Guardians and Warden of the Central Synagogue in 1870. During these roles, Ferdinand instigated an offer of £2,000 which ultimately led to the foundation of the Army Reservists' Home.

In 1883, Ferdinand de Rothschild was High Sheriff of Buckinghamshire. He was adopted as a Liberal candidate for the London constituency of St George's in the East, but on being invited, he contested in 1885 another seat, at Aylesbury, which he won and held until his death. In 1886, over the issue of Irish Home Rule, he joined the Liberal Unionists and hosted meetings at Waddesdon Manor (where Joseph Chamberlain, Arthur Balfour and Lord Randolph Churchill were often guests) that led to the formation of the Unionist-Conservative alliance.

From 1896, he was a Trustee of the British Museum, a role suggested by Sir Augustus Wollaston Franks and which led to his Renaissance collection being bequeathed to the British Museum after his death. This is now exhibited as the Waddesdon Bequest.

Ferdinand de Rothschild died at Waddesdon Manor on his 59th birthday, thought to be the result of a cold caught when last visiting his wife's tomb. He was buried next to his wife at the Rothschild Mausoleum in the Jewish Cemetery at West Ham.

== Collecting ==
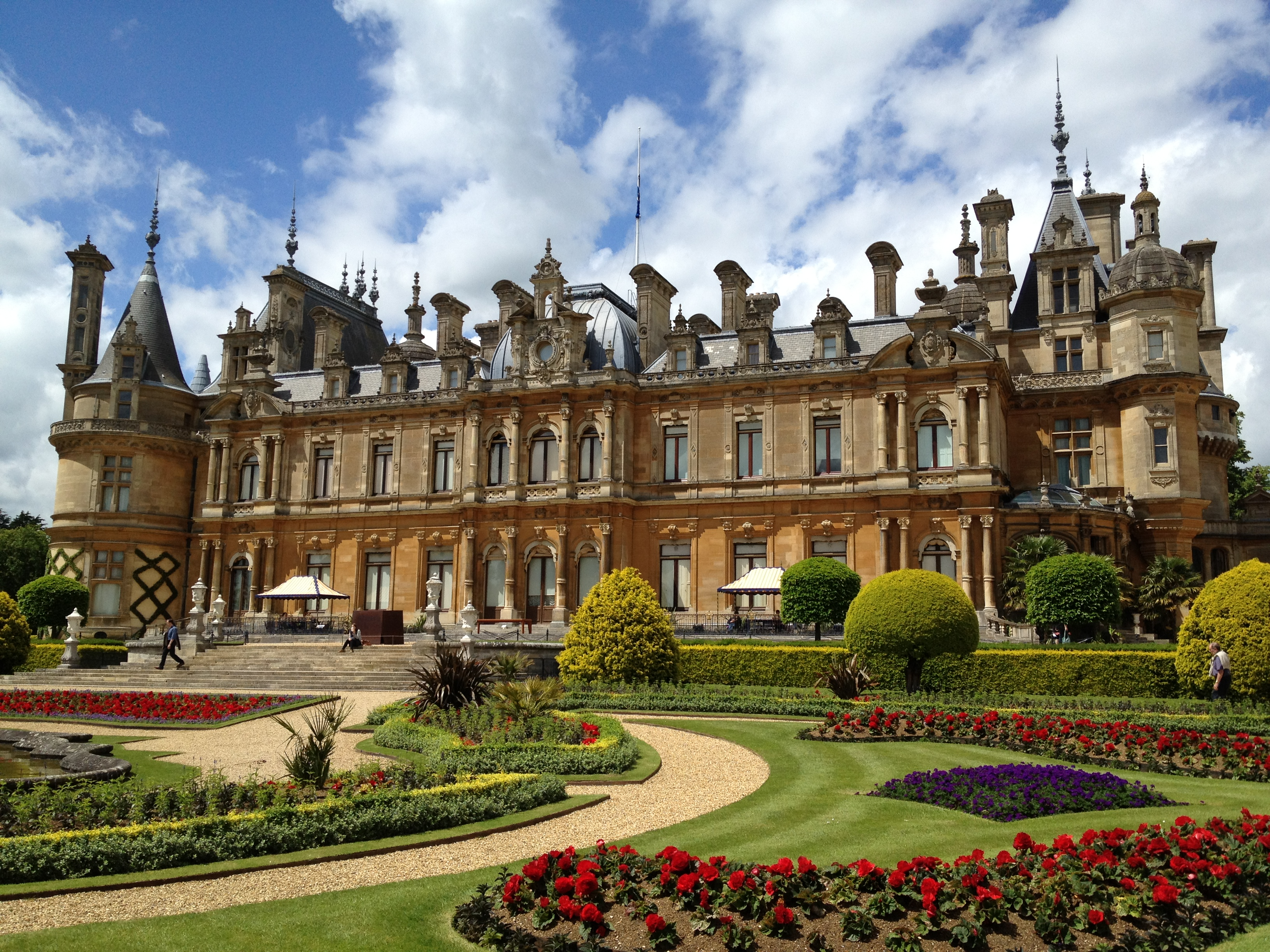
Waddesdon Manor was the weekend 'party house' of Ferdinand de Rothschild, where he entertained many famous and royal guests whilst showing off his diverse collections.

Fluent in three languages, and considered "as much at home in Paris as in London", Ferdinand was an already inspired collector of eighteenth-century French decorative arts from his early twenties. For instance, when he was only 21 years old, his first purchase was made of one of the most ostentatious rococo Sèvres ship vases from the Louis XV era. His development into one of the most renowned collectors of the 19th century, even amongst the Rothschilds, is known by the abundance of family letters in which he is referred to as "curiosity-hunting... all over Europe".

In the autumn of 1874, Ferdinand de Rothschild bought land in the village of Waddesdon in Buckinghamshire from the Duke of Marlborough in order to build a property in which he could house his diverse collections. Between 1874 and 1889, architect Gabriel-Hippolyte Destailleur designed and built Waddesdon Manor, a 19th-century manor based on the 16th-century French Chateau de Chambord. He sought to 'revive the decoration of the eighteenth century in its purity, reconstructing the rooms out of old material, reproducing them as they had been during the reigns of Louis'.

His collection of Renaissance objets d'art from the house was bequeathed to the British Museum, and under the terms of the bequest are still displayed there separately as the Waddesdon Bequest. The Holy Thorn Reliquary is a highlight of the collection, though its distinguished provenance was unknown until after World War II. He willed Waddesdon Manor to Alice Charlotte von Rothschild, his unmarried younger sister, who had lived with him there. Yet, 'towards the end of his life, Baron Ferdinand de Rothschild became increasingly concerned about the future of Waddesdon Manor', shown here in his quote from The Red Book:

"A future generation may reap the chief benefit of a work which to me has been a labour of love, though I fear Waddesdon will share the fate of most properties whose owners have no descendants, and fall into decay. May the day yet be distant when weeds will spread over the garden, the terraces crumble into dust, the pictures and cabinets cross the Channel or the Atlantic, and the melancholy cry of the nigh-jar sound from the deserted towers" - Ferdinand de Rothschild, 1897

Miss Alice, in turn, bequeathed the estate to their nephew, James Armand de Rothschild. Following James' death, the manor passed to the National Trust, in a special arrangement where the Rothschild family remain involved.

== Sources ==
- Seccombe, Thomas (1901). "Rothschild, Ferdinand James de" . In Lee, Sidney (ed.). Dictionary of National Biography (1st supplement). London: Smith, Elder & Co.
- Davis, R. W. (2004). "Ferdinand James von Rothschild". Oxford Dictionary of National Biography. Oxford Dictionary of National Biography (online ed.). Oxford University Press. doi:10.1093/ref:odnb/24159. (Subscription, Wikipedia Library access or UK public library membership required.)
- Mrs James de Rothschild - Rothschilds at Waddesdon Manor (Collins, 1979) ISBN 0-00-216671-2
- Thornton, Dora (2015), A Rothschild Renaissance: The Waddesdon Bequest, 2015, British Museum Press, ISBN 978-0-7141-2345-5

Parliament of the United Kingdom
Preceded by Nathan Mayer Rothschild	Member of Parliament for Aylesbury; 1885–1898 (representation reduced to one member later in 1885); With: George W. E. Russell (July–December 1885)	Succeeded by Lionel Walter Rothschild
