= Catherine Jane Wood =

British nurse (1841–1930)

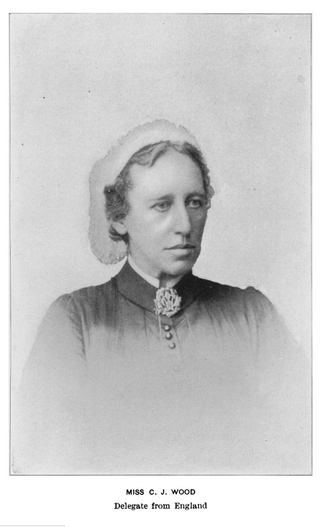
- Depicted in 1901 in the American Journal of Nursing
- Born: 18 June 1841
- Died: 14 June 1930 (aged 88)
- Medical career
- Profession: Nurse
- Field: Paediatrics
- Institutions: Great Ormond Street Hospital; Alexandra Hospital for Children with Hip Disease

Catherine Jane Wood (18 June 1841 – 14 June 1930) was an English nurse, collaborator to Charles West in the early years of the Great Ormond Street Hospital, London, and pioneer of paediatric nursing.

== Career ==
In the summer of 1863, Catherine Jane Wood started to frequent the Great Ormond Street Hospital (GOSH) as a sister, under the supervision of the superintendent Isabella Babb.

In the spring of 1864, after only one year, she was nominated ward superintendent thanks to her proven skills.

From 1865 or 1866, Catherine Jane Wood with her colleague Jane Spencer Percival were dragged into the project of a new hospital, created to host children affected by joint diseases. In March 1867, the new Hospital, initially called "The House of Relief for Children with Chronic Diseases of the Joints”, opened in the Queen Square. It was a small Hospital equipped with only ten beds. In 1881 the Hospital changed its name to “The Alexandra Hospital for Children with Hip Disease” in honour of its main supporter: the future Queen Alexandra.

In 1870 Catherine Jane Wood was nominated by Charles West Lady Superintendent of Cromwell House, which was a detachment of GOSH at Highgate Hill. In 1878 she was chosen by the New Commitment Management as the Lady Superintendent of GOSH. Unfortunately, ten years later, her brother died of typhoid. Wood decided to send a resignation letter to the President of GOSH, Lord Aberdare, because she felt compelled to help her widow sister-in-law with eleven dependent children.

== Selected works ==
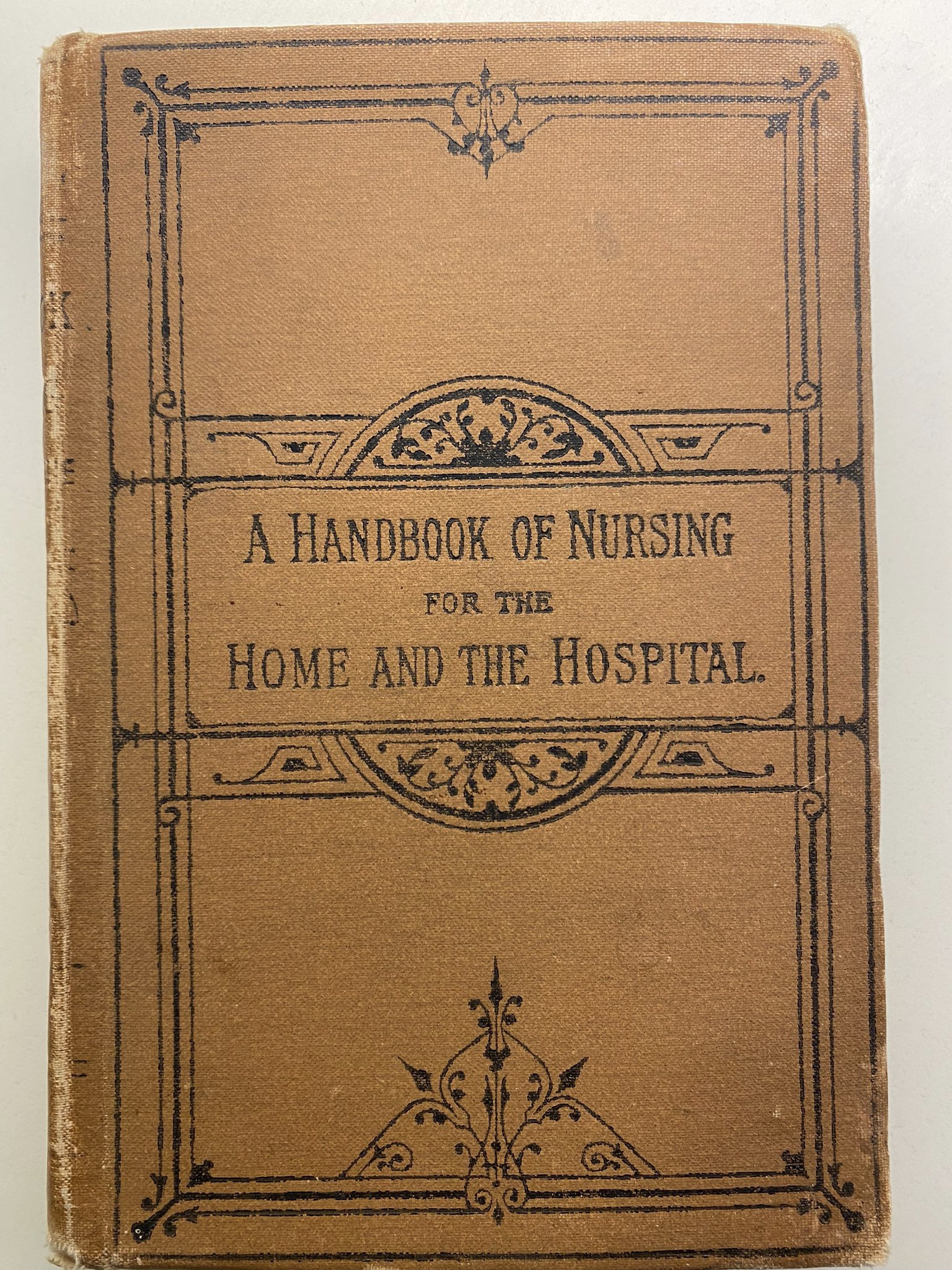
A Handbook of Nursing for The Home and The Hospital

- A Handbook of Nursing for the Home and the Hospital: with a glossary of the most common medical terms, Cassell & Co., London 1878
- International Health Exhibition, London, 1884 - Food and Cookery for Infants and Invalids, William Clowes & Sons, London 1884
- Private Nursing, in The Nursing Record, 12 April 1888, pp. 14–16
- The Training of Nurses for Sick Children, in The Nursing Record, 6 December 1888, pp. 507–10
- The Wants of the Nursing Profession, in The Nursing Times, 29 June 1918, pp. 689–690

== Bibliography ==
- Anonymous, "Miss Catherine Jane Wood", The British Journal of Nursing, July 1930, p. 191
- Luca Borghi; Anna Marchetti. "Introducing the trained and educated gentlewoman into the wards of a children's hospital. The role of Charles West, M.D. (1816-1898) in the rise of pediatric nursing". Medicina Historica. 2018 (2(2)): 63–74.
