= Silvia Schievano =

Italian professor of biomedical engineering

- Education: University College London; Polytechnic University of Milan
- Scientific career
- Workplaces: University College London; Great Ormond Street Hospital
- Thesis: Computational structural analysis as a tool to develop valved stent applications and technology (2008)
- Doctoral advisor: Philipp Bonhoeffer
- Website: profiles.ucl.ac.uk/10144-silvia-schievano

Silvia Schievano is an Italian engineer who is Professor of Biomedical Engineering at the at University College London (UCL) Institute of Cardiovascular Science and Great Ormond Street Hospital for Children. Her research develops engineering methodologies to study human health and disease, with a focus on cardiovascular disease and treatments. She was awarded the Royal Academy of Engineering MacFarlane Medal in recognition of her efforts to design patient-specific heart valves.

== Early life and education ==
Schievano was an undergraduate student in engineering at the Polytechnic University of Milan. She moved to the United Kingdom for her doctoral research, where she joined Great Ormond Street Hospital. Her research developed computational structure analysis for valved stent technologies.

== Research and career ==
Schievano was awarded a research fellowship by the Royal Academy of Engineering. Schievano develops engineering methods for improving human health and disease. She has focused on strategies to enhance safety in first-in-man studies. She was made lead for the University College London Centre for Clinical Cardiovascular Engineering. Catheter aortic valve insertion is used in thousands of patients each year, but the replacement valve must be placed in a differently sized tract in each patient. Her early work involved the design of patient-specific tents that were based on the shape and size of people's hearts. These stents were designed using CT scans and finite element methods. She pioneered the use of platinum rhodium, a memory alloy that can be created in different sizes, which could self-expand upon reaching the implantation site, simplifying the surgical procedure. The flexibility of the shape-memory alloy made it more easy to move around the heart's arterial wall. She worked alongside Medtronic to assemble the new stents. Schievano also introduced the stereolithography and laser machines to the clinical procedure, allowing surgeons to practise using a transparent model before the operation begins. The stents developed by Schievano were much less traumatic than most cardiac surgery, and allowed patients to be walking within twenty four hours.

Schievano is developing new devices to treat children with congenital heart defects. She uses clinical data and computational modelling to assess the dysfunctional sites and promote device personalisation by stimulating implantation and biological interactions.

=== Selected publications ===
- Philipp Lurz; Louise Coats; Sachin Khambadkone; et al. (7 April 2008). "Percutaneous pulmonary valve implantation: impact of evolving technology and learning curve on clinical outcome". Circulation. 117 (15): 1964–1972. doi:10.1161/circulationaha.107.735779. ISSN 0009-7322. PMID 18391109. Wikidata Q46267949.
- Silvia Schievano; Francesco Migliavacca; Louise Coats; et al. (1 February 2007). "Percutaneous pulmonary valve implantation based on rapid prototyping of right ventricular outflow tract and pulmonary trunk from MR data". Radiology. 242 (2): 490–497. doi:10.1148/radiol.2422051994. ISSN 0033-8419. PMID 17255420. Wikidata Q31095956.
- Silvia Schievano; Louise Coats; Francesco Migliavacca; Wendy Norman; Alessandra Frigiola; John Deanfield; Philipp Bonhoeffer; Andrew M Taylor (1 July 2007). "Variations in right ventricular outflow tract morphology following repair of congenital heart disease: implications for percutaneous pulmonary valve implantation". Journal of Cardiovascular Magnetic Resonance. 9 (4): 687–695. doi:10.1080/10976640601187596. ISSN 1097-6647. PMID 17578725. Wikidata Q50975770.
