= George W. E. Russell =

British politician

The Right Honourable George W. E. Russell
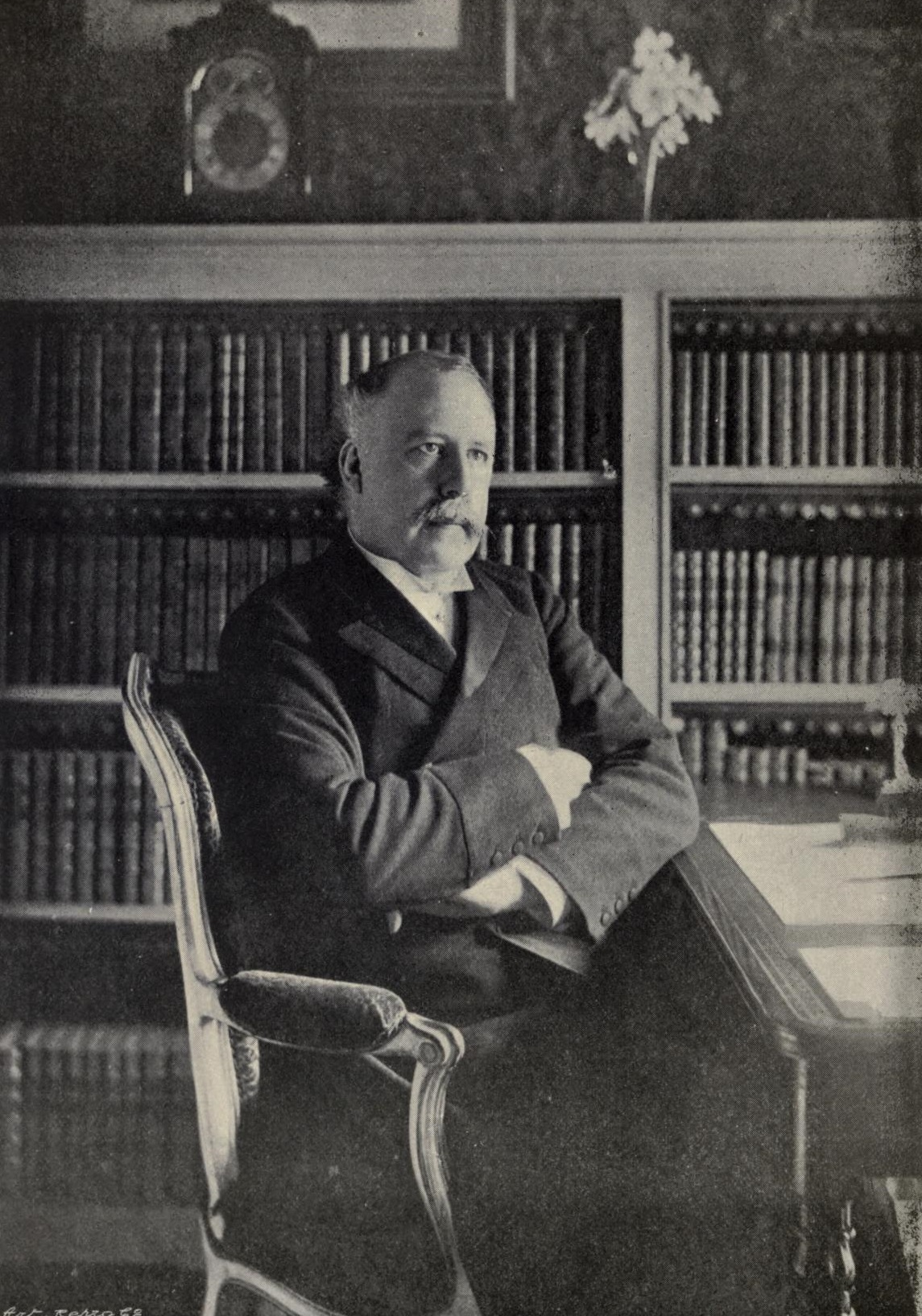

Under-Secretary of State for India
- In office 19 August 1892 – 21 June 1894
- Monarch: Victoria
- Prime Minister: William Ewart Gladstone
- Preceded by: George Curzon
- Succeeded by: The Lord Reay

Under-Secretary of State for the Home Department
- In office 12 March 1894 – 21 June 1895
- Monarch: Victoria
- Prime Minister: The Earl of Rosebery
- Preceded by: Herbert Gladstone
- Succeeded by: Jesse Collings

Personal details
- Born: 3 February 1853 London, England
- Died: 17 March 1919 (aged 66) London, England
- Party: Liberal
- Education: University College, Oxford

George William Erskine Russell PC (3 February 1853 – 17 March 1919) was a British biographer, memoirist and Liberal politician.

== Background and education ==
Russell was born in London, England, on 3 February 1853, the youngest son of Lord Charles Russell, sixth son of John Russell, 6th Duke of Bedford. His mother was Isabella Clarisa Davies, daughter of William Griffith Davies, of Penylan, Carmarthenshire. He was educated at Harrow School. He matriculated at University College, Oxford in 1872, graduating B.A. in 1876, M.A. 1880. He obtained only a pass degree. Ill-health, particularly myelitis, put paid to his chances of academic distinction.

== Political career ==
Russell was Liberal Member of Parliament for Aylesbury from 1880 to 1885, and for Biggleswade from 1892 to 1895. He was appointed by William Ewart Gladstone as Parliamentary Secretary to the Local Government Board from 1883 to 1885 and as Under-Secretary of State for India from 1892 to 1894. Under Lord Rosebery he was Under-Secretary of State for the Home Department from 1894 to 1895. He was also an Alderman on London County Council from 1889 to 1895. He was appointed a Privy Counsellor in 1907, and held the honorary degree of LLD from St Andrews University. He was the author of the biography The Right Honourable William Ewart Gladstone (1891). Russell was a journalist by profession, and a close ally of the Grand Old Man, a home ruler, when Gladstone presented the bill to the Commons for the second time on 13 February 1893.

== Personal life ==
Russell died, unmarried, at 18 Wilton Street, London, on 17 March 1919, aged 66.

== Photographs ==
The Victoria and Albert Museum's photograph of Russell can be seen online.

== Selected publications ==
- The Right Honourable William Ewart Gladstone. 1891.
- Matthew Arnold. 1894. Russell, George William Erskine (1904). 2nd edition. ISBN 9781421963327.
- Collections and recollections, by one who has kept a diary. 1898. 1903 edition.
- Sydney Smith. 1904.
- Russell, George William Erskine (1907). Seeing and Hearing.
- Afterthoughts: Forty-six essays, mainly on English political, social and literary topics. 1912.
- Saint Alban the Martyr, Holborn: A History of Fifty Years (1913)
- Politics and personalities, with other essays. 1917.
- Prime ministers and some others, a book of reminiscences. 1918.

Parliament of the United Kingdom
Preceded by Nathan Rothschild; Samuel George Smith	Member of Parliament for Aylesbury; 1880–1885; With: Nathan Rothschild (1880–1885); Ferdinand James von Rothschild (1885)	Succeeded by Ferdinand James von Rothschild (single-member constituency)
Preceded by Viscount Baring	Member of Parliament for Biggleswade; 1892–1895	Succeeded by Lord Alwyne Compton
Political offices
Preceded by John Tomlinson Hibbert	Parliamentary Secretary to the Local Government Board; 1883–1885	Succeeded by The Earl Brownlow
Preceded by George Curzon	Under-Secretary of State for India; 1892–1894	Succeeded by The Lord Reay
Preceded by Herbert Gladstone	Under-Secretary of State for the Home Department; 1894–1895	Succeeded by Jesse Collings
