= Trinity Congregational Church, Arundel =

Church in West Sussex, England

Trinity Congregational Church
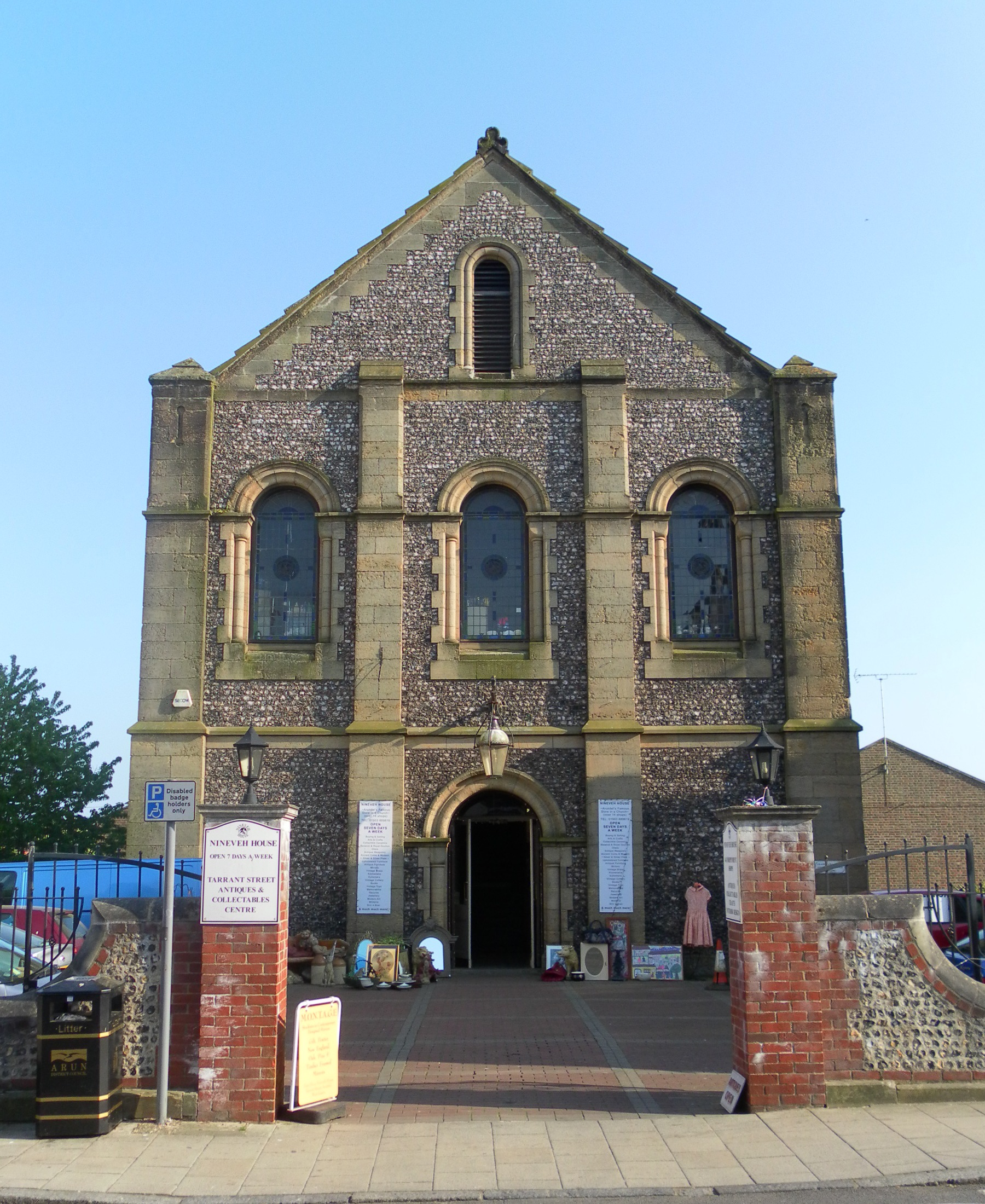
- The former chapel from the north-northwest
- Trinity Congregational Church
- 50.8539°N 0.5555°W
- OS grid reference: TQ 01773 07037
- Location: 31A Tarrant Street, Arundel, West Sussex BN18 9DG
- Country: England
- Denomination: Congregational
- Previous denomination: Independent

History
- Status: Chapel
- Founded: 1780 (in another building)
- Consecrated: 14 August 1838

Architecture
- Functional status: Closed
- Heritage designation: Grade II
- Designated: 7 October 1974
- Architect: Robert Abraham
- Style: Neo-Norman/Romanesque Revival
- Groundbreaking: 1836
- Completed: 1838
- Closed: 1980s

Trinity Congregational Church, later known as Union Chapel, is a former place of worship for Congregationalists and Independent Christians in Arundel, an ancient town in the Arun district of West Sussex, England. Protestant Nonconformism has always been strong in the town, and the chapel's founding congregation emerged in the 1780s. After worshipping elsewhere in the town, they founded the present building in the 1830s and remained for many years. Former pastors included the poet George MacDonald. Robert Abraham's distinctive neo-Norman/Romanesque Revival building was converted into a market in the 1980s and has been renamed Nineveh House. The church is a Grade II Listed building.

== History ==
Protestant Nonconformism—Christian worship which stood apart from both the Established Anglican Church and Roman Catholicism—was successful and influential in Sussex from the 17th century. Although East Sussex had greater numbers of Nonconformists and more chapels, some parts of West Sussex were hotbeds of Protestant dissent. Among these was the ancient hilltop town of Arundel, on the River Arun inland from the English Channel coast. Several groups founded congregations there in the 17th century, including Presbyterians, Quakers and Baptists.

A period of decline for Nonconformist worship was reversed in the late 18th century, and a group of Independent Christians (who advocated Congregationalist polity) began meeting in 1780. In 1784, they erected a chapel in Tarrant Street in the town centre. The congregation had early links with Presbyterianism and the Countess of Huntingdon's Connexion, a localised Calvinistic sect, but by the 19th century the chapel was aligned with the Congregational Church.

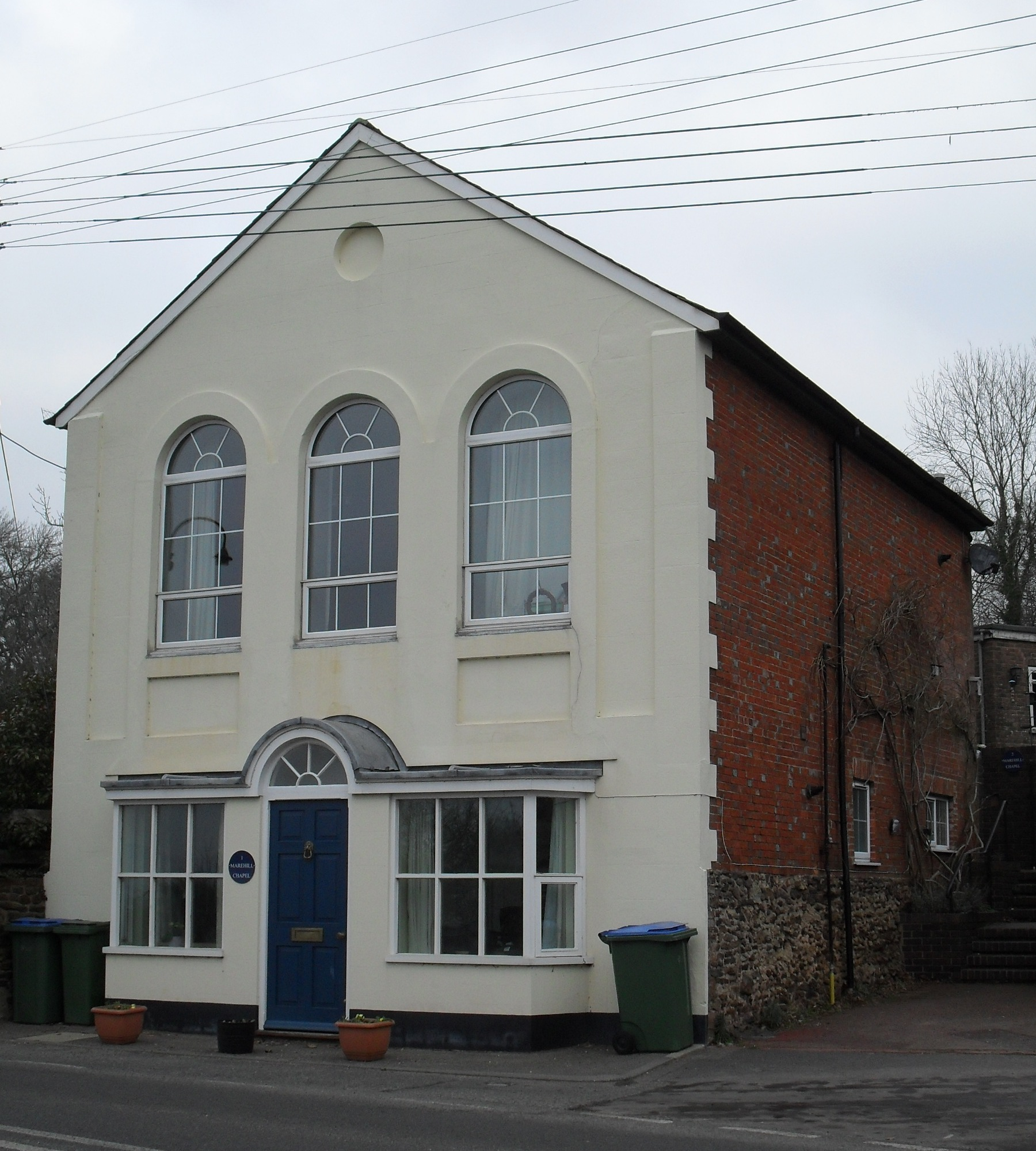
The former Providence Congregational Chapel was founded at nearby Marehill in 1845 by Trinity Church.

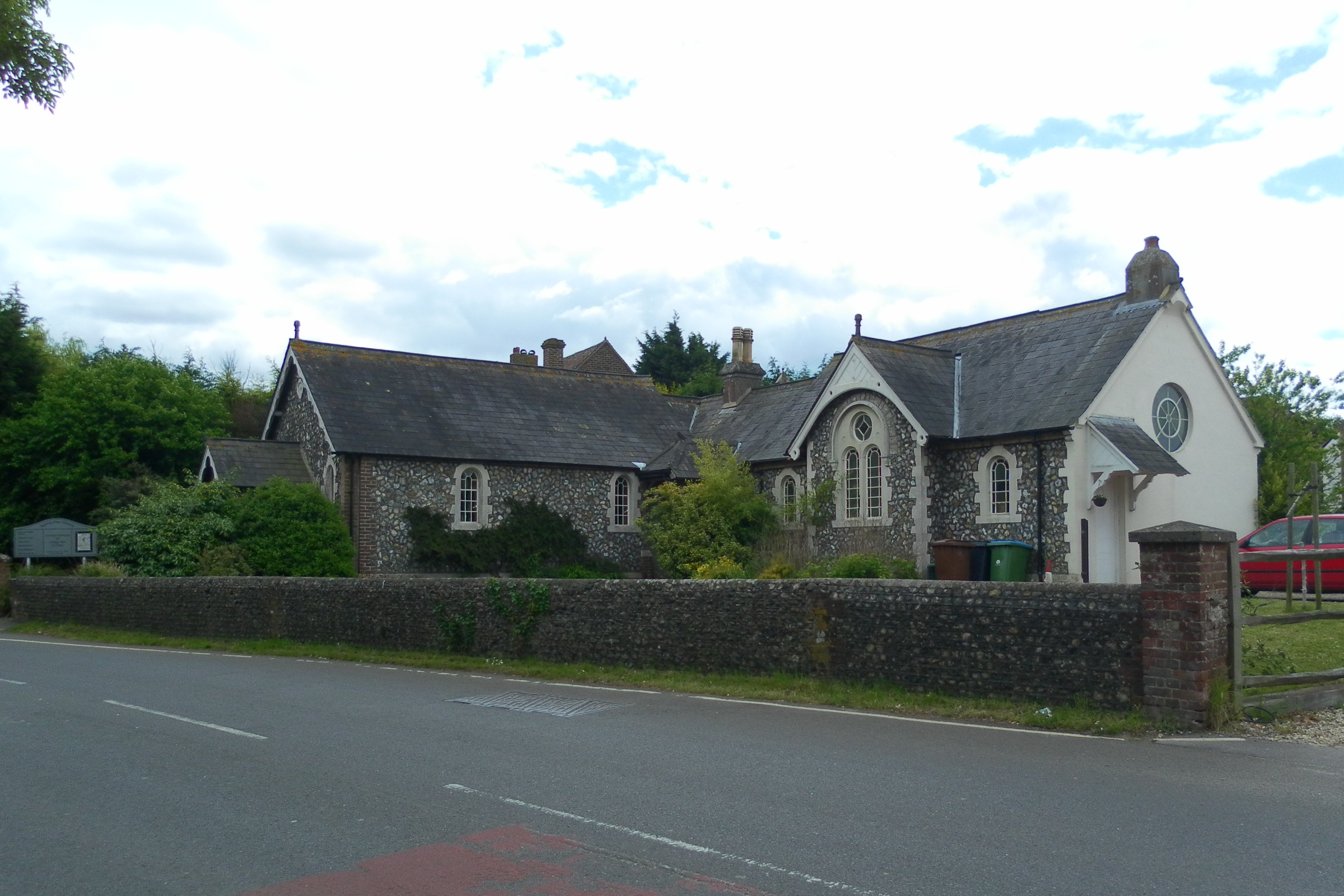
The church also carried out missionary work in Yapton, leading to the founding of a Congregational church there.

The congregation thrived in the early 19th century: a Sunday school and a choir were established in the 1810s, and the building was extended in 1822. Membership was recorded as 150 in 1829. In 1836, a site adjacent to the chapel was acquired for a new chapel. The contract to design and built it was issued on 18 July 1836. London-based architect Robert Abraham won the commission, and building work lasted from 1836 until 1838, when the new chapel was consecrated. The new building was larger and had a hall underneath, originally used as a schoolroom. Abraham was working on Arundel Town Hall at the same time, and the buildings have some similarities of design.

George MacDonald, the Scottish poet and children's writer, became the pastor in 1850, but his views and sermons were unpopular and he resigned three years later. He had trained as a Congregational pastor at Highbury Theological College, but did not finish the course which he began in 1848 and took up the position at Arundel after spending some time as a travelling preacher. His preaching was influenced by his poetry and did not suit the congregation's beliefs; he left in May 1853 after his stipend was cut, and turned to writing.

The church founded several other congregations and chapels in the area during the 19th century, starting at Yapton in the 1840s: the present building, a Grade II-listed flint structure with an attached Sunday school, was put up in 1861 and now houses an Evangelical congregation with the name Yapton Free Church. Providence Congregational Chapel was founded at Marehill, near Pulborough, in 1845; its successor, built in the 1950s in Pulborough town centre, is now known as Pulborough United Reformed Church. Amberley Congregational Chapel in Amberley was founded in 1867 and was used for worship until 1978. At Trinity Church, attendance at the time of the 1851 Census was over 100, and more than 100 children went to the Sunday school in the hall under the church. Ministers were housed in a manse further along Tarrant Street.

The church became known as Arundel Union Church (or simply Union Church) in 1966 when the congregation of the Arundel Baptist chapel joined; this allowed their building in Arun Street to be closed and sold. The Congregational denomination merged with the Presbyterian Church of England and some smaller denominations in 1972 to form the United Reformed Church, which prompted the Baptist members of the congregation to split from the church in 1973 and join Angmering Baptist Church until they built a new church of their own in Arundel in 1980. Meanwhile, United Reformed services were held at Union Church until 1981, but the building was sold during the 1980s. Since 1990 it has housed the Arundel Arts, Crafts and Antiques Market, which has 16 stalls and is open daily. The name Nineveh House has been adopted since the building was converted to commercial use. It was designated a Grade II Listed building on 7 October 1974.

The chapel was registered for the solemnisation of marriages from April 1840 until its certification was formally revoked in August 1982.

== Architecture ==
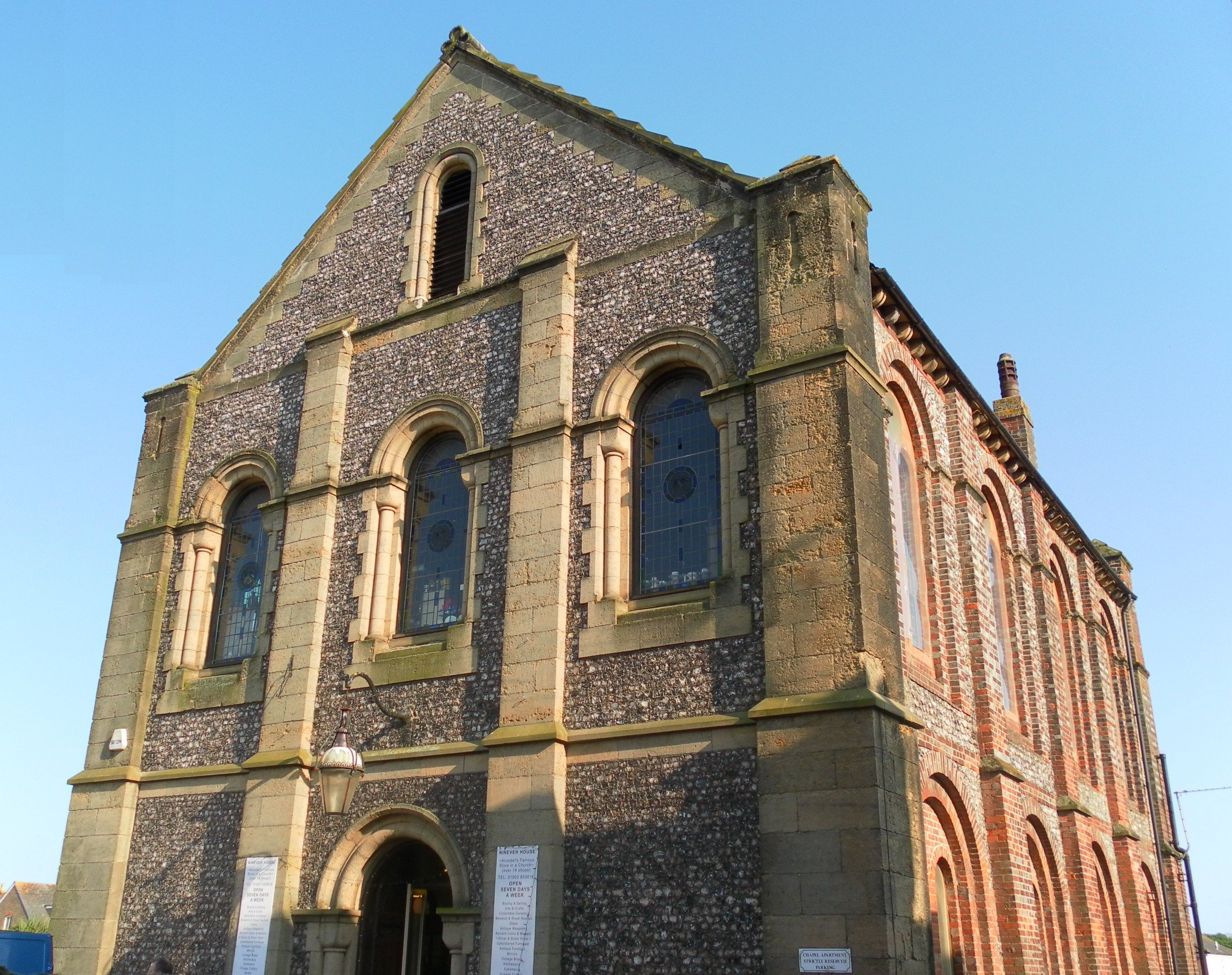
The west (pictured, right) and east elevations are of brick and flint.

Robert Abraham's design represents a "brief appearance" of the Romanesque Revival style in the architectural history of Nonconformist chapels in Sussex. There are also elements of Neo-Norman architecture. Ian Nairn dismissed the building as "not good", and notes its similarity to the "gloomy" town hall and council offices of 1836 by Abrahams.

The façade is of knapped flint with galletting and stone quoins, dressings, buttresses and string-courses. The side walls have red and grey brickwork and knapped flint. The front elevation is divided into three equal-width bays by full-height ashlar-faced stone buttresses in the form of pilasters, which terminate at a stone string-course separating the gabled slate roof (enclosing attic space) from the body of the two-storey building. The eaves are supported on ashlar corbels. Below the gable, at the attic level, is a louvred round-arched window surrounded by roll-moulding. The first floor has three tall windows with round heads, and the centrally placed entrance at ground-floor level is set into a similar arch flanked by capital-topped colonnettes (small medieval-style shafts). The stone used for the window and door surrounds, string-courses and buttresses was quarried at nearby Pulborough. Inside, the original gallery on the north wall (surrounding the entrance) survives, but those on the west and east sides have been removed.

There was originally a garden at the front. Its surrounding walls and gate piers are included in the English Heritage listing. They are of brick with inlaid flints and stone dressings and coping. The piers are also of stone from Pulborough, and have string-courses and decorative panelling.

== See also ==
- List of places of worship in Arun

== Bibliography ==
- Elleray, D. Robert (2004). Sussex Places of Worship. Worthing: Optimus Books. ISBN 0-9533132-7-1.
- Nairn, Ian; Pevsner, Nikolaus (1965). The Buildings of England: Sussex. Harmondsworth: Penguin Books. ISBN 0-14-071028-0.
- Stell, Christopher (2002). Nonconformist Chapels and Meeting-houses in Eastern England. Swindon: English Heritage. ISBN 1-873592-50-7.
