= John Bethell (inventor) =

British solicitor and inventor

- Born: Bristol
- Died: 22 February 1867; Cleveland Square
- Occupation: Inventor
- Relatives: Richard Bethell, 1st Baron Westbury

John Bethell (c. 1804–1867) was a British solicitor and inventor, who patented the 'Bethell process' for preserving timber using creosote under pressure, giving a life of 25 years or more. It was particularly used for railway sleepers and telegraph poles.

== Life ==
Bethel was born in Bristol in c. 1804 of Dr Richard Bethell and his wife Jane Baverstock. His elder brother was Richard Bethell, 1st Baron Westbury. On 28 February 1833 he married Louise Sarah Abraham, and they had seven children.

He was a member of the Institution of Civil Engineers and the Bath and County Club.

He died 22 February 1867 in London.

== Patents ==
from the 1868 Institution of Civil Engineers obituary reproduced in Grace's Guide.

- 1834 manufacture of screws and rivets
- 1852 apparatus for digging and cultivating land.
- 1852 improvements in steam engines.
- 1838 process of preserving timber from decay and from the attacks of insects and worn, by impregnating it with creosote oil.
- 1840 lamp oils
- 1848 drying grain
- 1848 preserving meat
- 1848 preserving milk or wine with carbon dioxide
- 1853 retting flax fibre
- 1854 making coke from non-coking coal
- 1855 drying meat, vegetables and fruit
- 1857 steam plough
- 1858 separating iron pyrites from coal
- 1861 use of steatite in railway greases
- 1864 injecting with hydrocarbon vapour
