= Evelina London Children's Hospital =

Coordinates: 51°29′53″N 0°7′6″W

- Guy's and St Thomas' NHS Foundation Trust
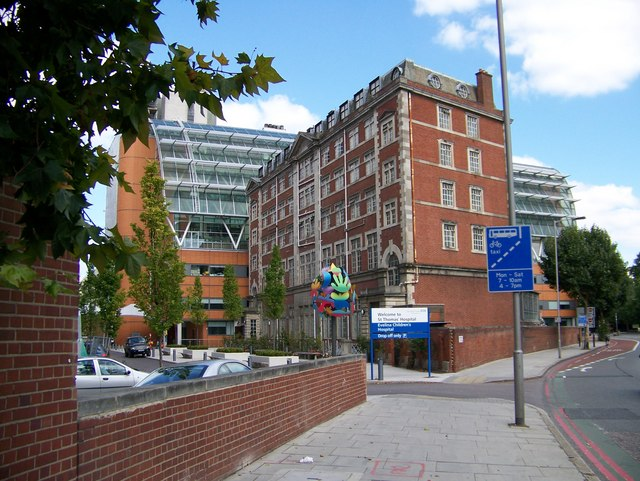
- Evelina London Children's Hospital

Geography
- Location: London, SE1, England, United Kingdom

Organisation
- Care system: NHS England
- Type: Specialist
- Affiliated university: King's College London

Services
- Emergency department: Yes Accident & Emergency
- Beds: 140
- Speciality: Children's hospital

History
- Founded: 1869, 2005 relocation
- Closed: 1976 on original site

Links
- Website: www.evelinalondon.nhs.uk
- Lists: Hospitals in England

Evelina London Children's Hospital is a specialist NHS hospital in London, England. It is administratively a part of Guy's and St Thomas' NHS Foundation Trust and provides teaching facilities for London South Bank University and King's College London School of Medicine. Formerly housed at Guy's Hospital in Southwark, it moved to a new building alongside St Thomas' Hospital in Lambeth on 31 October 2005.

== History ==
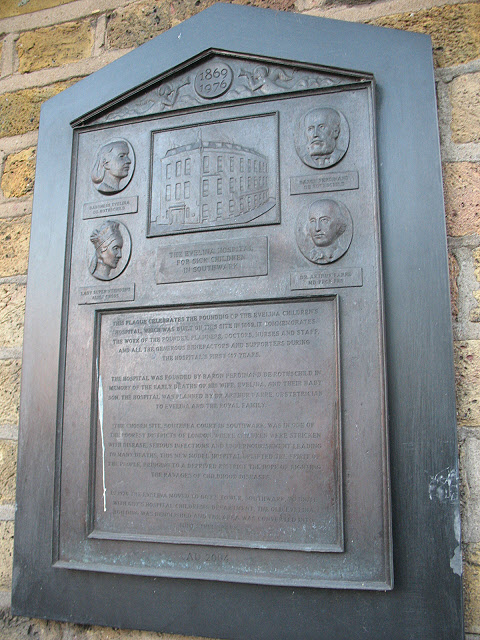
Plaque at the site of the old hospital in Southwark Bridge Road

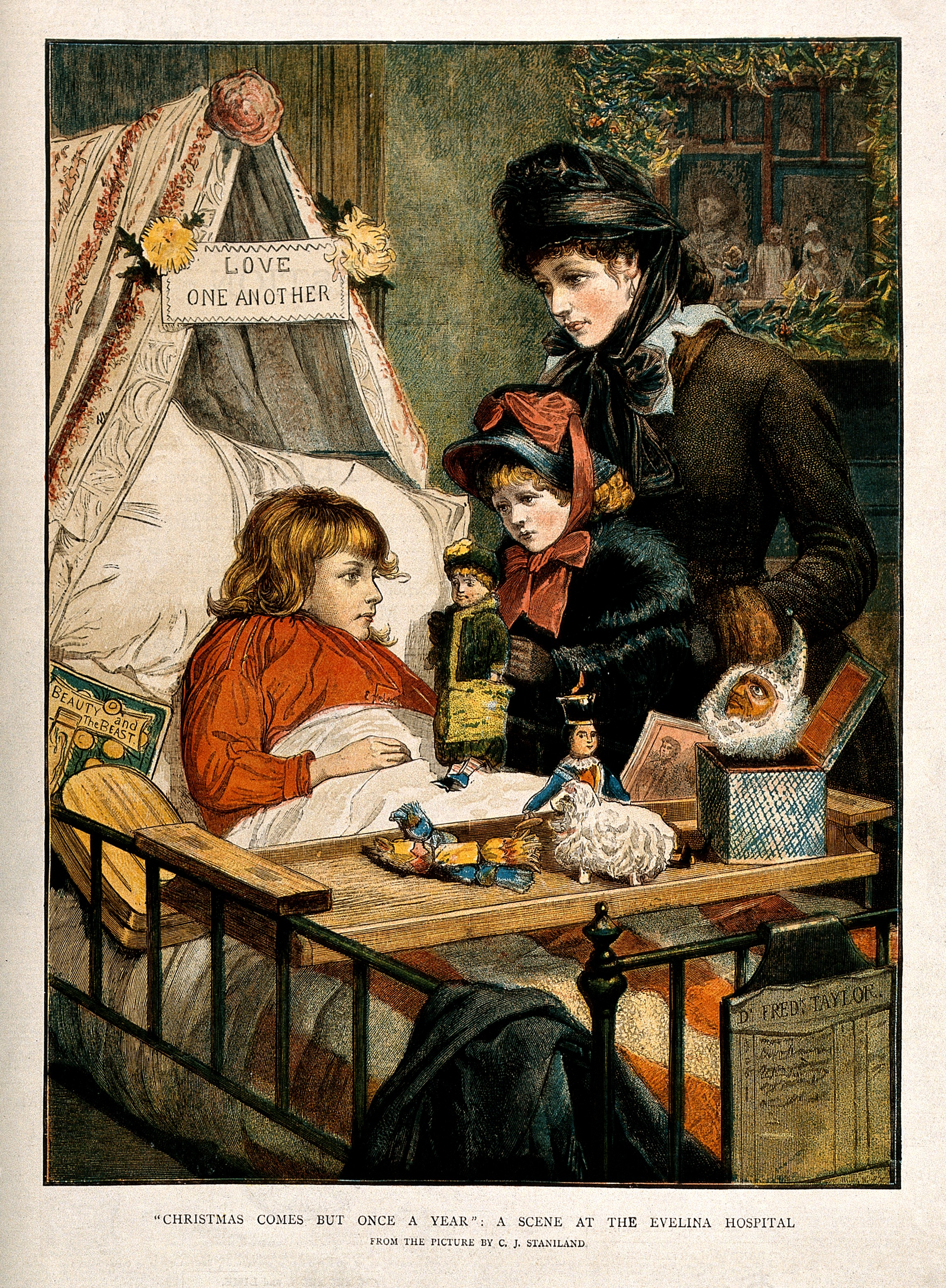
A mother and daughter visit a small boy at the hospital, 1882

The hospital was founded in 1869 (as Evelina Hospital for Sick Children) by Baron Ferdinand de Rothschild, whose wife, Evelina, and their child had died in premature labour. It was established in a purpose-built hospital in Southwark Bridge Road, Southwark, opposite what was originally the headquarters of the London Fire Brigade at 94 Southwark Bridge Road. It was brought under the management of Guy's Hospital in 1947 and became part of the National Health Service in 1948. In 1976 the original hospital building was closed, and the children's wards were moved to the newly built Guy's Tower.

In 1999 a decision was made to re-establish Evelina Children's Hospital as a new specialist hospital for all children's services at Guy's and St Thomas', in Lambeth, on the site of a former nurses' home. An architectural design competition was managed by RIBA Competitions and won by Hopkins Architects and engineers Buro Happold. Davis Langdon provided quantity surveying and employer's agent services. Construction began in 2002, and the building was completed in 2004, ready for fitting out. The building won the IStructE Award for Education or Healthcare Structures in 2006. In the same year, after a Europe-wide heatwave, the building's project team were recalled following reports of high indoor temperatures.

In 2018, it was announced that the Duchess of Cambridge would become the hospital's patron.

== Funding ==
Although a part of the NHS, the £60 million building cost of the new Evelina London Children's Hospital was largely paid for with private funds, with £50 million coming from the independent Guy's and St Thomas' Charity (the successor to the endowments of Baron Ferdinand de Rothschild, amongst others), and £10 million from NHS budgets and a major fundraising campaign by the Evelina London Children's Charity.

The NHS Children's and Young People's Gender Service for London is the partnership between Evelina, Great Ormond Street Hospital and the South London and Maudsley NHS Foundation Trust to take over from the Tavistock and Portman NHS Foundation Trust in the South of England.

=== Fundraising ===
In June 2020, aged five and inspired by Captain Tom Moore's NHS fundraising during the COVID-19 pandemic, Tony Hudgell set out to raise £500 for Evelina London Children's Hospital by walking 10km on his prosthetic legs. The figure quickly topped £1 million, with the final amount raised totalling £1.7 million.

== South Thames Retrieval Service ==
South Thames Retrieval Service (STRS) is a children's acute transport service which specialises in the inter-hospital transfer of critically ill children in London south of the River Thames. It operates from the children's intensive care unit of the Evelina London Children's Hospital. The unit is the lead centre for children's intensive care in the South Thames region and manages the clinical network for children's (paediatric) intensive care via the retrieval service, in conjunction with the intensive care units at St George's Hospital and King's College Hospital. With one phone call to the emergency number, a clinician in a South Thames hospital, can source clinical advice, a PICU bed and a transport team as necessary. STRS can then also coordinate specialist service input (e.g. cardiology).

== Notable staff ==
=== Alice Cross lady superintendent (1879-1903) ===
Alice Cross trained as a nurse at St Bartholomew's Hospital and was appointed Lady Superintendent at the Evelina in 1879, a post she held for 24 years. Miss Cross recognised the importance of convalescence for children having undergone surgery and launched an appeal in 1894 along with Miss L. M. Gordon (Matron of St Thomas's Hospital London), Miss M. J. Pyne (Matron of the Westminster Hospital), and Miss Amy C. Hayward, Hon Treasurer Invalid Children's Aid Association, to refurbish a convalescent home in Banstead Surrey. She is acknowledged on the plaque commemorating the founding of the hospital 1869. Baron Ferdinand de Rothschild left a legacy of £500.00 to her in his will.

== See also ==
- Healthcare in London
- List of hospitals in England
