= H. S. Sington =

British physician and anaesthetist (1878-1956)

Harold Sigismund Sington FRSE (1878–1956) was a 20th-century British physician and anaesthetist.

== Life ==
He was born in Higher Broughton, Manchester on 31 October 1878 the son of Joseph George Sington (a civil engineer) and his wife, Mary Florence Straus. He was educated at Cheltenham College. He studied medicine at Caius College, Cambridge University and did postgraduate studies in Brussels. His earliest posts were at St Thomas' Hospital in London.

From 1907 onwards he was anaesthetist at Great Ormond Street Hospital for Sick Children in London. He held this post for over 30 years. He also worked at the Royal Ear Hospital in Soho.

In the First World War he served in the Royal Navy as a Surgeon Lieutenant on Pacific patrols and with the Atlantic convoys.

He retired from Great Ormond Street in 1938 aged 60, but came out of retirement to serve as a Major in the Royal Army Medical Corps during the Second World War. Here he was mainly based at Edinburgh Castle.

In 1949, aged 70, he was elected Fellow of the Royal Society of Edinburgh. His proposers were James Pickering Kendall, Sir Robert Muir, Douglas Guthrie and George Freeland Barbour Simpson.

He died in London on 14 February 1956.

== Publications ==
- Anaesthesia for Children (1923)
- Anaesthesia in Children (1926)
- Pre-medication by Paraldehyde in Children (1929)
- Short Anaesthesia for Minor Surgery in Children (1936)

== Family ==
Around 1910 he married Ruth Louise Cohen from Toxteth. They had two children.

His son died aged 12 and a bed at Great Ormond Street was dedicated to his memory. His daughter emigrated to New Zealand.
