= Ormsby Vandeleur =

British Army officer (1763–1849)

General Sir Ormsby Vandeleur GCB
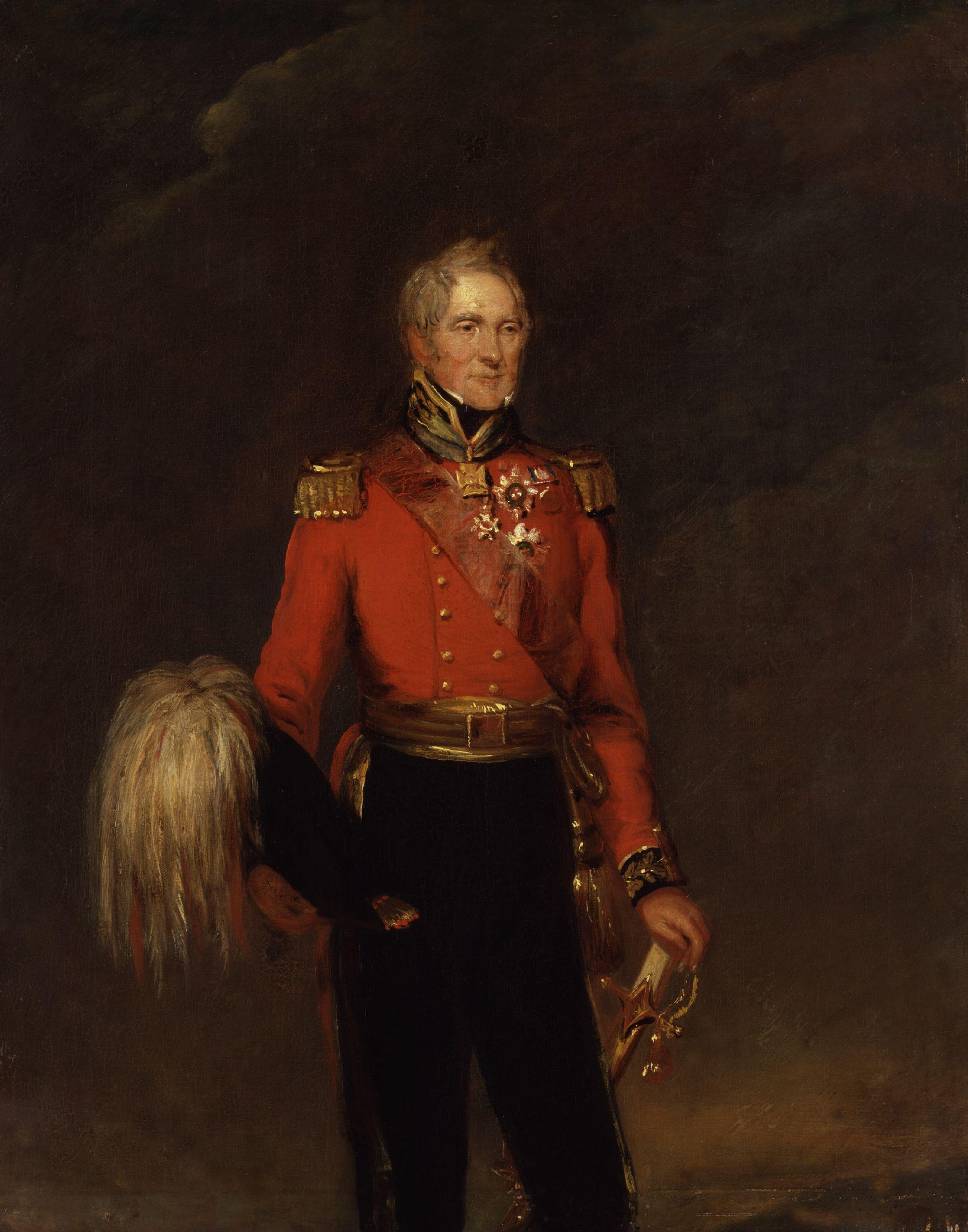
- Born: 1763; Kilrush, Ireland
- Died: 10 December 1849 (aged 85–86); Dublin, Ireland
- Military career
- Allegiance: United Kingdom
- Branch: Cavalry, Infantry
- Service years: 1781–1849
- Rank: General
- Conflicts: War of the First Coalition; Flanders Campaign; Second Anglo-Maratha War; Battle of Laswari; Battle of Farrukhabad; Peninsular War; Siege of Ciudad Rodrigo; Battle of Salamanca; Battle of San Millan-Osma; Battle of Vitoria; Battle of the Nive; Hundred Days; Battle of Waterloo
- Awards: Order of the Bath, 1815; Order of St. Vladimir, 2nd class Military Order of Max Joseph

General Sir John Ormsby Vandeleur (1763 – 10 December 1849) was a British Army officer who fought in the French Revolutionary and Napoleonic wars.

== Biography ==
Vandeleur, born in 1763, was the son of Richard Vandeleur (died 1772) and Elinor, daughter of John Firman of Firmount. The Vandeleurs, of Dutch origin, came to Ireland in the seventeenth century, and settled at Kilrush, County Clare, where they became the principal landowners. (Note: His parents, Captain Richard Vandeleur, 9th lancers, of Rutland, Queen's County, and Elinor, also had two daughters: Elizabeth who married into the Moore family and Ellen who married William Armstrong. His grandparents on his father's side were John Vandeleur (died 1754) and Frances Ormsby. They had several children (who were Aunt and uncles to Vandeleur): Mary (died 1790), John Ormsby (died 1777), Crofton (died 1795). A number of cousins served in the British army and three were killed in action. Thomas Pakenham Vandeleur, son of his uncle John Ormsby Vandeleur, was killed at Laswari in 1803. Two of his uncle Crofton's sons died during the Peninsular War. Richard died at Campo Maior, Portugal while serving with the 88th Foot and Frederick was killed in action at Vitoria in 1813 with the 87th Foot.)

Vandeleur's received a commission as ensign in the 5th Foot in December 1781, and was promoted to lieutenant in the 67th Foot in 1783. He served with his regiment in the West Indies, and, exchanging in 1788 into the 9th Foot, was promoted to captain on 9 March 1792. In October of the same year, he again exchanged into the 8th Light Dragoons, and was promoted to major on 4 May 1793.

In April 1794 Vandeleur went with his regiment to Flanders to serve under the Frederick, Duke of York, where he took part in the principal actions of the Flanders Campaign, and accompanied the army in its retreat across Holland to Bremen. On the embarkation of the British army for England in April 1795, Vandeleur remained with a small corps under General Dundas until December.

In August 1796 he went to the Cape of Good Hope, and served in the operations against the Dutch under Generals Craig and Dundas. On 1 January 1798 he was promoted to lieutenant-colonel in the 8th Light Dragoons.

In October 1802 Vandeleur went with his regiment to India, and served as lieutenant-colonel with the local rank of colonel in command of a brigade of cavalry under Lord Lake in the Second Anglo-Maratha War 1803–1805. At the Battle of Laswari on 1 November 1803, Vandeleur turned the enemy's left flank and took two thousand prisoners, receiving the thanks of Lord Lake. He was similarly distinguished in November 1804 for the cavalry affair at Fathghar, where the Maratha chief Holkar was surprised and defeated. Equally brilliant were his charge and recapture of artillery at Afzalghar on 2 March 1805.

In 1806 Vandeleur returned to England. On 16 April 1807, he exchanged into the 19th Light Dragoons, and on 25 April 1808 was promoted to be brevet colonel. On 4 June 1811 he was promoted to major-general, and appointed to command an infantry brigade of the Light Division in the Peninsular War.

Vandeleur led the division, after Craufurd received his mortal wound, to the assault of the breach of Ciudad Rodrigo on 19 January 1812, when he was severely wounded. In June of the following year, he intercepted a French division and cut off one of its brigades, taking three hundred prisoners and forcing the remainder to disperse in the mountains. He took part in the Battle of Salamanca on 22 July, leading a brigade in the Light Division. On 21 June 1813 he was at the Battle of Vittoria, and in the following month was appointed to command a brigade of light dragoons under Sir Thomas Graham (afterwards Lord Lynedoch), and later under Lord Niddry, and he was engaged in all the operations of that column, including the Battle of the Nive. At the close of the Peninsular War he was selected to conduct a division of British cavalry and artillery from Bordeaux to Calais.

In October 1814 Vandeleur was appointed to the staff of the British army in Belgium. He was given the colonelcy of the 19th Light Dragoons on 12 January 1815. He commanded the 4th Cavalry Brigade, consisting of the 11th, 12th, and 16th light dragoons, at the Battle of Waterloo, and from the time that The Earl of Uxbridge was wounded and had to leave the field he commanded, as next senior, the whole of the British cavalry at Waterloo, and during the advance on Paris until Louis XVIII entered the capital (on 8 July). For his services in the Peninsula and Belgium, he was made a knight-commander of the Order of the Bath (military division) on 3 January 1815, and received the Army Gold Medal with clasps for Ciudad Rodrigo, Salamanca, Vittoria, and the Nive, and the Silver Waterloo Medal. He was also nominated a knight of the second class of the Russian Order of St. Vladimir, and a commander of the Bavarian Order of Maximilian Joseph.

The 19th Light Dragoons were disbanded in 1820, and in 1823 Vandeleur was given the colonelcy of the 14th Light Dragoons, from which on 18 June 1830 he was transferred to the colonelcy of the 16th Lancers. He was promoted to lieutenant-general on 19 July 1821, and general on 28 June 1838. He was appointed Knight Grand Cross of the Order of the Bath in 1833. He died on 10 December 1849 at his house in Merrion Square, Dublin.

== Family ==
Vandeleur married a daughter of the Rev. John Glesse in 1829 and the couple had two children, a son and a daughter Ellen who married Colonel Richard Greaves (for some twenty years assistant military secretary to the commander of the forces in Ireland, and afterwards colonel of the 40th Foot).
