= George Cavendish =

George Cavendish may refer to:

- George Cavendish, 1st Earl of Burlington (1754–1834), member of the United Kingdom Parliament
- George Cavendish (writer) (circa 1494–1562), English writer
- George Cavendish (Aylesbury MP) (1784–1809), English politician
- Lord George Cavendish (died 1794), British politician
- Lord George Cavendish (1810–1880), member of the United Kingdom Parliament
- George Cavendish-Bentinck (1821–1891), British barrister, Conservative politician, and cricketer
- George Cavendish (Irish politician) (1766–1849), Anglo-Irish politician
