= James Du Pré =

English politician

James Du Pré (1778–1870), of Wilton Park, Beaconsfield, Buckinghamshire, was an English politician.

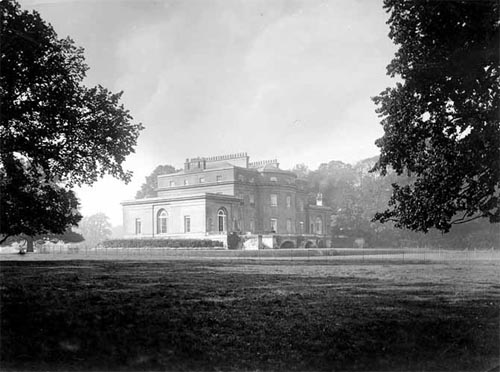
Wilton Park House

He was the son of Josias Du Pre (1721-1780), former Governor of Madras and educated at Eton College (1791) and Christ Church, Oxford (1796-1800). He succeeded his father to Wilton Park in 1780.

Du Pré was a Member (MP) of the Parliament of Great Britain (and then the Parliament of the United Kingdom) for Gatton 29 Apr. 1800–1802, for Aylesbury 1802–1804 and for Chichester 1807–1812.

He was selected High Sheriff of Buckinghamshire for 1825–26.

He married in 1801 Madelina, the daughter of Sir William Maxwell, 4th Bt., of Monreith, Wigtown, a niece of the Duchess of Gordon. They had 3 sons and 8 daughters, one of whom was the mother to the well-known politician Henry Labouchère.

Parliament of Great Britain
| Preceded by John Petrie; Sir Walter Stirling, Bt | Member of Parliament for Gatton; 1800–1800; With: Sir Walter Stirling, Bt | Succeeded by Parliament of the United Kingdom |
Parliament of the United Kingdom
| Preceded by Parliament of Great Britain | Member of Parliament for Gatton; 1801–1802; With: Sir Walter Stirling, Bt | Succeeded by James Dashwood; Sir Mark Wood, Bt |
| Preceded by Scrope Bernard; Gerard Lake | Member of Parliament for Aylesbury; 1802–1806; With: Robert Bent 1802–04; William Cavendish 1804–06 | Succeeded by Sir George Nugent, Bt; George Cavendish |
| Preceded by Thomas Steele; George White-Thomas | Member of Parliament for Chichester; 1807–1812; With: George White-Thomas | Succeeded by The Earl of March; William Huskisson |
