= Scrope Bernard-Morland =

British politician

Sir Scrope Bernard-Morland, 4th Baronet (1 October 1758 – 18 April 1830) was a British politician and baronet.

== Background ==
Born Scrope Bernard in Pestel Amberg (Perth Amboy) in New Jersey, he was the sixth and youngest son of Sir Francis Bernard, 1st Baronet and Amelia Offley, daughter of Stephen Offley. In 1818, he succeeded his older brother Thomas as baronet. Bernard-Morland was educated at Harrow School and Christ Church, Oxford. He graduated as a Bachelor of Arts in 1779 and was promoted by seniority to Master of Arts two years later.

In 1788, he was awarded the degree of Doctor of Civil Laws (DCL). One year later, Bernard-Morland became a member of the College of Laws in London, and in 1795, he was promoted Judge of the Episcopal Court of Durham. In 1811, by Royal Licence, he assumed the surname of Bernard-Morland to inherit the estates of his father-in-law.

== Career ==
In 1782, Bernard-Morland was appointed Private Secretary to the Lord Lieutenant of Ireland, an office he held until 1787. He was Secretary to the Commission of Enquiry into Public Offices in 1785 and Gentleman Usher of the Black Rod in Ireland in 1787. Between 1789 and 1792, he was Under-Secretary of State for the Home Department. Bernard-Morland entered the British House of Commons for Aylesbury in 1789. He represented the constituency first in the Parliament of Great Britain then in the Parliament of the United Kingdom until 1802. Subsequently, he sat as Member of Parliament for St Mawes from 1806 until 1808 and again from 1809 to his death in 1830.

== Family ==
On 26 July 1785, he married Harriett Morland, the only daughter of William Morland, at St George's, Hanover Square, in Westminster. They had seven children, five sons and two daughters. Bernard-Morland died at his home in Pall Mall, London, aged 71 and was buried in Great Kimble in Buckinghamshire, where he owned an extensive estate. He was succeeded in the baronetcy successively by his third son Francis and then his fourth son Thomas.

Parliament of Great Britain
Preceded by Sir Thomas Hallifax; William Wrightson	Member of Parliament for Aylesbury; 1789–1801; With: William Wrightson 1789–1790; Gerard Lake 1790–1801	Succeeded by Parliament of the United Kingdom
Parliament of the United Kingdom
Preceded by Parliament of Great Britain	Member of Parliament for Aylesbury; 1801–1802; With: Gerard Lake	Succeeded by Robert Bent; James Du Pre
Preceded by William Windham; Sir William Young, Bt	Member of Parliament for St Mawes; 1806–1808; With: Sir John Newport, Bt 1806–1807; William Shipley 1807; Viscount Ebrington 1807–1808	Succeeded by Earl Gower; Viscount Ebrington
Preceded by Earl Gower; Viscount Ebrington	Member of Parliament for St Mawes; 1809–1830; With: Earl Gower 1809–1812; William Shipley 1812–1813; Francis Horner 1813–1817; Joseph Phillimore 1817–1826; Sir Codrington Carrington 1826–1830	Succeeded by Sir Codrington Carrington; George Grenville Wandisford Pigott
Political offices
Preceded by Hon. John Townshend	Under-Secretary of State for the Home Department; 1789–1794	Succeeded by Hon. Thomas Brodrick
Baronetage of Great Britain
Preceded by Thomas Bernard	Baronet (of Nettleham); 1818–1830	Succeeded by Francis Bernard-Morland
