= Thomas Coke, 1st Earl of Leicester (seventh creation) =

British politician (1754–1842)

The Right Honourable The Earl of Leicester
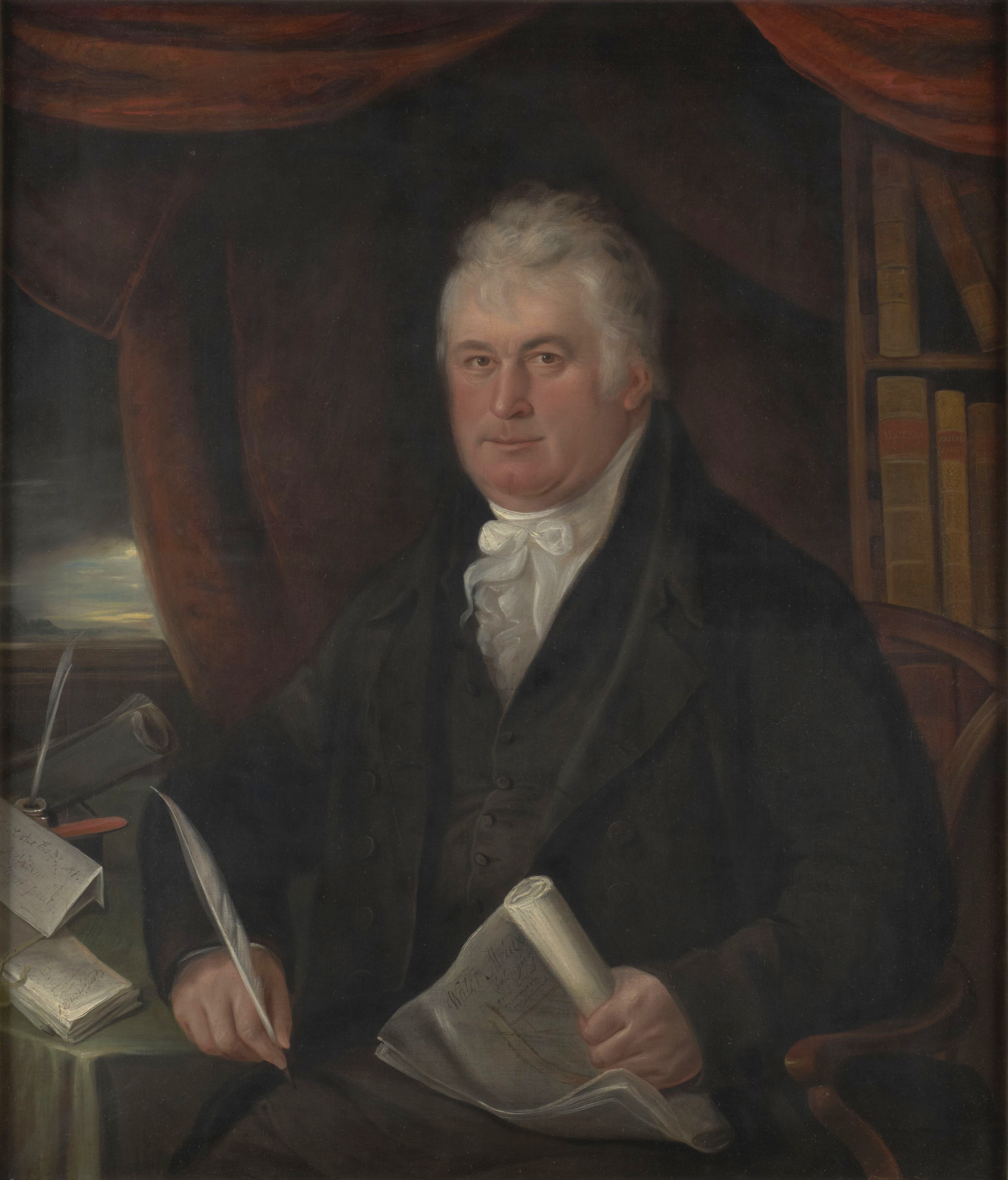

Member of Parliament for Norfolk
- In office 1807–1832
- Preceded by: Edward Coke
- Succeeded by: Constituency abolished

Member of Parliament for Derby
- In office 1807
- Preceded by: Edward Coke
- Succeeded by: Edward Coke

Member of Parliament for Norfolk
- In office 1790–1807
- Preceded by: Sir Edward Astley, 4th Baronet
- Succeeded by: Edward Coke

Member of Parliament for Norfolk
- In office 1776–1784
- Preceded by: Wenman Coke
- Succeeded by: John Wodehouse, 1st Baron Wodehouse

Personal details
- Born: Thomas William Coke; 6 May 1754 London
- Died: 30 June 1842 (aged 88) Longford, Derbyshire
- Party: Whig
- Spouse(s): Jane Dutton (1753–1800), Anne Keppel (1803–1844)
- Children: with Jane Dutton: 1777, Jane; 1779, Anne; 1795, Elizabeth; with Anne Keppel: 1822, Thomas
- Parent(s): Wenman Coke; Elizabeth Chamberlayne

Arms of Coke, Earls of Leicester: Per pale gules and azure, three eagles displayed argent

Thomas William Coke, 1st Earl of Leicester (6 May 1754 – 30 June 1842), known as Coke of Norfolk or Coke of Holkham, was a British politician and agricultural reformer. Born to Wenman Coke, Member of Parliament (MP) for Derby, and his wife Elizabeth, Coke was educated at several schools, including Eton College, before undertaking a Grand Tour of Europe. He returned to Britain and married. When his father died he inherited a 30,000-acre Norfolk estate. Returned to Parliament in 1776 for Norfolk, Coke became a close friend of Charles James Fox, and joined his Eton schoolmate William Windham in his support of the American colonists during the American Revolutionary War. As a supporter of Fox, Coke was one of the MPs who lost their seats in the 1784 general election, and he returned to Norfolk to work on farming, hunting, and the maintenance and expansion of Holkham Hall, his ancestral home.

Coke was again returned to Parliament in 1790, sitting continuously until 1832, and he primarily spoke on matters of local interest, such as the Corn Laws. His second focus was on civil liberties, and he spoke out against the government's response to the Peterloo Massacre and similar events. Described as the "greatest commoner in England", he chose the passage of the Great Reform Act 1832 as the moment to retire, later being made Earl of Leicester in July 1837. After a short illness, Coke died on 30 June 1842, and was succeeded as Earl by his son Thomas. Coke's main legacy was as an agricultural reformer, not as a politician; he has historically been credited with sparking the British Agricultural Revolution through the reforms he made to farming on his estates. Later historians have questioned this, however, noting that the developments credited to him are most likely the work of other individuals; nevertheless, he has still been described as "the real hero of Norfolk agriculture".

== Early life and education ==
Coke was born on 6 May 1754 in London, to Wenman Coke (originally Wenman Roberts) and Elizabeth Chamberlayne. The Cokes were a landowning family of Derbyshire, originally from Norfolk, Wenman representing Derby as one of its two members of parliament, and as such Coke was born into a wealthy, estate-owning family; one of his first memories was "being held up to a window to watch a fox being cornered and killed by hounds". Little is known of Coke's father; Wenman is described as a shy person who "saw little company and lived much out of the world; his habits were those of a country gentleman, bending his mind to agriculture, moderately addicted to field sports and more than either, to reading in which he passed many hours; firm in his principles which were those of the old Whig; amiable in his disposition mild in his manners, he was beloved of his friends". The family's prospects improved significantly in 1759 when Coke was five, when his great-uncle, Thomas Coke, 1st Earl of Leicester, died. The cause of Thomas's death is not certain, although there are chances it was a duel, but the result was that upon the death of Thomas's wife Margaret, Wenman inherited a substantial Norfolk estate, including Holkham Hall, a "Palladian masterpiece". Margaret studiously avoided the rest of the family, vowing to outlive Wenman simply to ensure that he did not inherit the estate. In the event she died in 1775, one year before Wenman, who thereby inherited.

Few records exist of Thomas Coke's early years, although it is known that he was educated in Longford, Derbyshire, before going to a school in Wandsworth run by French settlers. In 1765 he was sent to Eton College, where he was joined by William Windham, a close friend in his later life. Coke was apparently happy at Eton, and was excellent at field sports; on one occasion 70 snipes he had killed were found in his room, and on another, he narrowly avoided being punished for shooting a pheasant in Windsor Great Park. He was not particularly interested in his academic studies, but by the time he left Eton in 1771 Coke had developed a close circle of friends and connections from the landowning class, and practical skills to deal with his future estates. After leaving school he undertook a Grand Tour of Europe, financed by his father and his great-aunt (who offered him £500 not to go to a university, regarding them as dens of vice). Coke visited France and Italy, where he witnessed the marriage of the Young Pretender to Princess Louise of Stolberg-Gedern; Louise apparently fell in love with Coke, preferring the similarly aged Englishman to her 52-year-old alcoholic husband.

== Career ==
By the time Coke returned to Britain, plans were already under way for him to enter Parliament. When an election was called in 1774, Weman stood for the seat of Norfolk, with his son asked to stand in his place for Derby. Coke was not particularly enthusiastic about this, and withdrew when his opponent discovered he was under 21, the requisite age to stand for Parliament. With his father elected, Coke travelled with him to London, meeting members of the British high society. His sister Elizabeth and her husband James Dutton were also visiting, with Dutton's sister Jane, and Coke fell in love with her. Wenman was not impressed when Coke asked him to let them be married, as he had picked out the daughter of a baronet for his son, but with the intercession of Wenman's friend Harbord Harbord, he finally consented to their marriage, which was solemnized on 5 October 1775.

The new couple lived in Godwick Manor, their peace disturbed in 1776 when Wenman's health began to fail. He finally died on 10 April after "a constipation which medicine could not remove", leaving Coke in charge of a 30,000-acre estate at the age of 22. Soon after his father's death, Harbord and other senior Whigs visited Coke and asked him to stand for Norfolk in his father's stead. Coke was not enthusiastic, not seeing himself as a politician and hoping to enjoy his new estates and wealth, but after his visitors pointed out a Tory might otherwise replace him "my blood chilled all over me from my head to my foot, and I came forward". On 12 April he issued a manifesto to the Norfolk electorate, soon returning to campaign, and after being unanimously nominated on 27 April he was elected in May.

=== Entry to Parliament ===
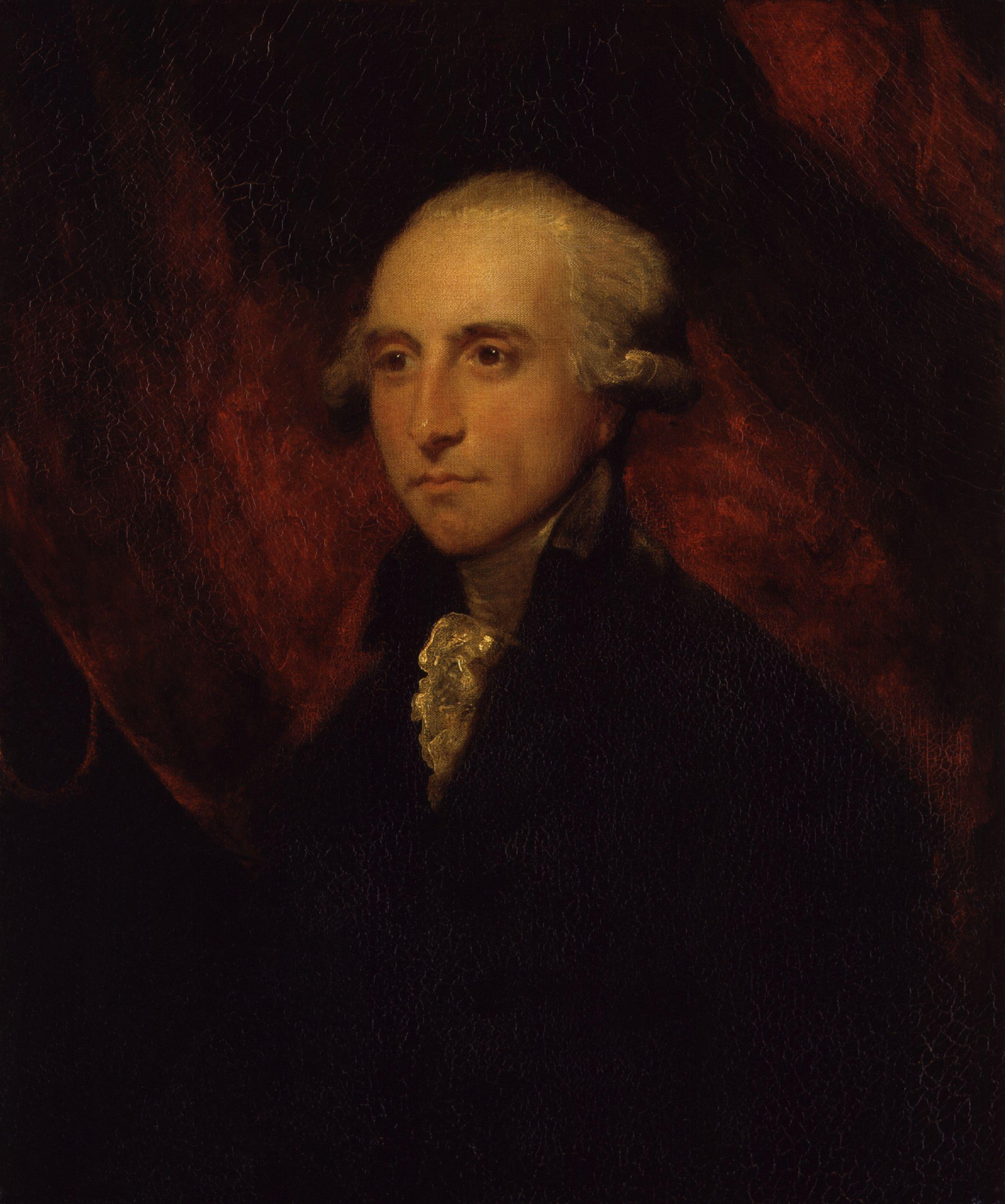
William Windham, Coke's friend and supporter during the American Revolutionary War

Little is known of Coke's early career in Parliament; he spoke relatively infrequently, and the parliamentary session was dissolved soon after his election. During that summer, however, he struck up a relationship with Charles James Fox, a soon-to-be famous Whig politician noted for his outspoken and flamboyant lifestyle. Coke later recounted that "When I first went into Parliament I attached myself to Fox and clung to him through life. I lived in the closest bond of friendship with him." The period was one of economic stability and political calm under Lord North, which ended due to the American Revolution and resulting American Revolutionary War. Coke was noted for his support of the American colonists; as a strong supporter of the 1688 Glorious Revolution and the resulting Bill of Rights 1689, he felt that the support of the espoused principles of justice and tolerance in Britain and overseas was his duty as a British subject, and saw no conflict between his position as a supporter of the colonists and his patriotism. Following the Battles of Saratoga, it became clear that any victory in America would be long and expensive, and in an attempt to raise funds King George III asked subjects to donate. In Norwich, a meeting was held in January 1778 for this purpose; it raised £4,500 in less than an hour. Windham and Coke attended this meeting, Windham making an impassioned speech pointing out that the campaign had so far resulted only in "disappointment, shame and dishonour", and that "peace and reconciliation with America" was the only option. Windham, Coke and their supporters then withdrew to a nearby pub, where they drafted a petition to the king from "the Nobility, Gentry, Clergy, Freeholders and Inhabitants of the County of Norfolk". This was presented to Parliament by Coke on 17 February 1778, signed by 5,400 people from Norfolk. George III took this as a personal insult, and as a result, disliked Coke until his death.

Coke also brought up the issue of the hunting game. During the late 18th century a series of laws were passed protecting a landowner's right to hunt, and giving severe penalties to poachers. On 27 February Coke, an enthusiastic hunter, suggested in Parliament that these laws be relaxed; "Combinations had been formed in the Country against the execution of these laws and some lives had been lost". Before any motion could be brought (it was not until 1827 that the laws were revised), the situation in America came up again. On 22 February, Henry Seymour Conway brought a motion asking the King to "listen to the humble prayer and advice of his faithful Commons, that the war on the continent of North America may no longer be pursued for the impractical purpose of reducing the inhabitants of that country to obedience by force". While the motion failed, it was again brought on 27 February, and passed. With this, Conway moved that "An humble address be presented to His Majesty"; George III replied that he would see them on 3 March at St James's Palace. It was then that "the most important and symbolic act of Coke's political career" occurred. As a Knight of the Shire, Coke had the right to appear in court dressed "in his boots" as opposed to in formal court dress; this he did, appearing in front of George III dressed in leather breeches, boots and spurs.

Eventually, the king began negotiations with the American colonies and accepted the resignation of Lord North – an action which would, eventually, lead to Coke leaving Parliament. A new government was formed in April 1782, with Lord Rockingham as Prime Minister and Fox and Lord Shelburne as Secretaries of State. Rockingham and Shelburne disagreed constantly, particularly over the situation in North America, and with Rockingham's death on 1 July Shelburne was made Prime Minister. At this the rest of the government resigned, and after a period of political chaos, the short-lived Fox-North Coalition was formed in April 1783. Coke was disgusted by this arrangement, describing it as a "revolting compact". An East India Bill, which created 7 commissioners to oversee India, brought chaos to the coalition. Controversially, the commissioners would be appointed by the government, not by the crown, which challenged what the King saw as his constitutional right. Defeated in the House of Lords, the bill was used by George III to overturn Fox's government and install a government led by William Pitt the Younger. Parliament was eventually dissolved on 25 March 1784, and thanks to Coke's long-standing support of Fox and his actions, the ensuing general election led to Coke losing his seat.

=== Norfolk work ===
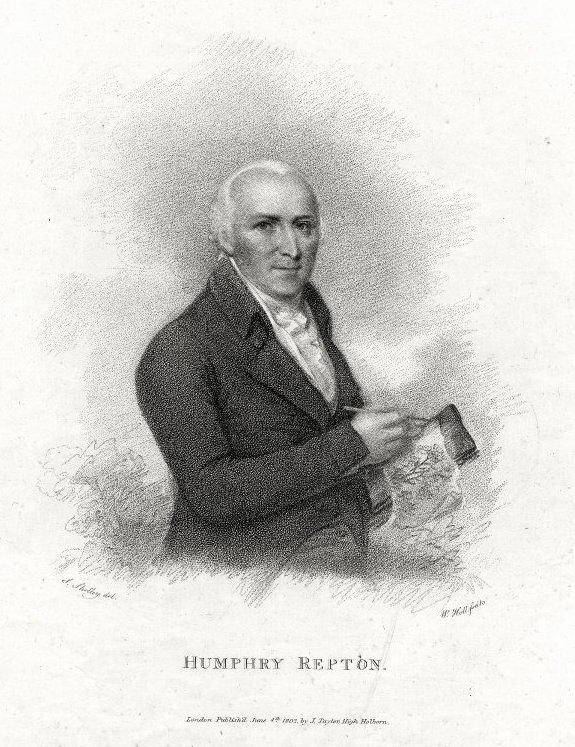
Humphry Repton, whom Coke employed to modify the grounds at Holkham Hall

In between his Parliamentary work, Coke and his wife had been maintaining and improving his estates since they took possession of it in April 1776. The cornerstone was Holkham House, a "temple to the arts" built by Coke's great uncle. Knowing that he did not have the same understanding of classical architecture and art, Coke mainly left it alone, instead focusing on the park and gardens.

A 2023 reappraisal of his contribution to the art collection discusses his addition of portraits by Thomas Gainsborough, Joshua Reynolds, Ramsay Richard Reinagle, George Hayter, Chester Harding, and John Opie. He also added sculpture by Joseph Nollekens, Richard Westmacott, Thomas Banks, and Francis Leggatt Chantrey.

The grounds had been laid out during the 1720s and 1730s, in a design which quickly became seen as old-fashioned. Coke had the lake massively expanded. A total of 36,000 cubic yards of earth was shifted and he employed the gardener John Sandys from 1781. Sandys created several large areas of woodland by planting over 7,000 trees on 22 acres near the Eastern Lodge, another ten acres near the lake, and four acres of marshland. In 1784 a further woodland expansion was undertaken, with 40 acres and 11,000 trees, and between 1785 and 1789 396,750 trees were planted on a further 179 acres. Sandys retired in 1805 and was replaced in 1806 by James Loose, but he continued to advise Coke on forestry matters. The library was also expanded, through the work of William Roscoe, who bought books including the Mainz Psalter for Coke between 1814 and 1842.

Coke also expanded the estate itself, incorporating farms around the House as their leases ended, and by 1800 the estate covered 3,500 acres. Samuel Wyatt was also employed from 1799 to 1805 to build new lodges at the entrance of the extended estate, and until 1806 also worked on a new kitchen garden; this covered six acres. Humphry Repton was employed to extend the lake yet again, and proposed building a boathouse and fishing pavilion, as well as a chain ferry leading to a "snug thatched cottage"; there is no evidence this proposal was ever approved. Most of the work was completed by 1810, and from then on Coke's attention turned to hunting game. The estate was explicitly designed with that in mind, and game books note between 1,300 and 2,500 partridges were killed most years. In 1822, Elizabeth, Coke's daughter, recorded that 800 birds were shot in one day.

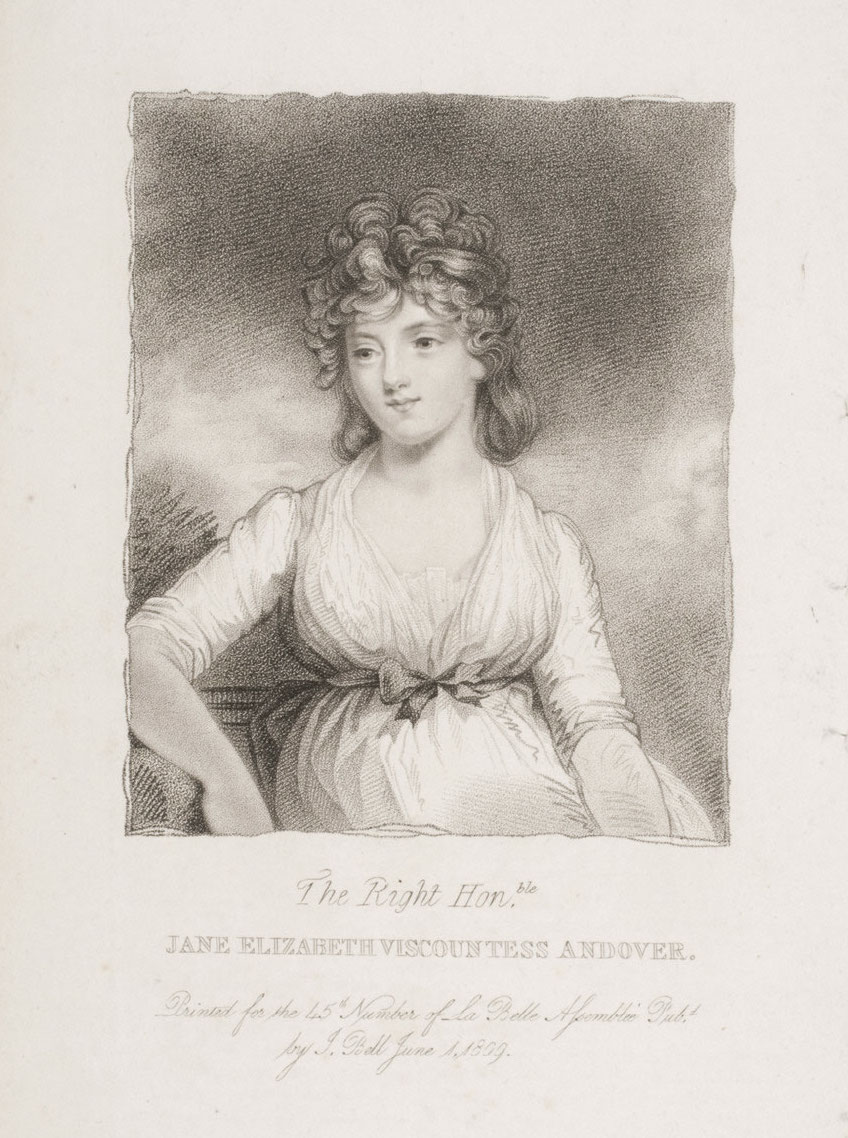
Daughter Jane Coke

Jane Dutton, Coke's wife, gave birth to their first child in 1777, a daughter named Jane. Two more daughters followed; Anne Margaret in 1779, and Elizabeth in 1795, before Jane's death in 1800. Jane was married to Charles Nevison Howard, Viscount Andover, on 21 June 1796, but on 11 January 1800 Andover died in a shooting accident on the Holkham estate. Jane remarried to Henry Digby in 1806, and they had 11 children.

=== Landlord and agriculturalist ===
As a landlord, Coke was a firm believer in the right and moral obligation of a landowner to improve the quality of life of those living on his estates. The roles of landlord and tenant were clearly set out by the late 18th century; the landlord was to provide fields, roads and buildings, while the tenant would provide the seed, implements and manual labour. Coke's estate included 54 farms when he inherited it, with excellent farm output. There were, however, significant debts as a result of his uncle's work on Holkham Hall, with the interest alone being £4,000 a year. He had some difficulties dealing with the people employed before he inherited the estates, and when the steward Ralph Cauldwell, appointed by Coke's uncle, retired in 1782, Coke failed to replace him until 1816. This replacement was Francis Blaikie, a Scottish man who had previously been employed as estate steward for Lord Chesterfield. Blaikie paid close attention to where farms were doing badly or could do better, but often struggled to deal with Coke. Coke lacked financial sense in matters other than the agricultural, on one occasion selling all his land near Manchester. It wasn't until 20 years later that Blaikie became aware of this, after receiving a query from the new owners about the mineral rights. Blaikie travelled to Manchester to meet the solicitor who had handled the sale, finding not only poorly drafted conveyances but that all the sold land had been rich in coal.

In the early 18th century, farmland was run through an open field system, which were commonly overstocked and made trying experimental methods very difficult; enclosed farms, on the other hand, were higher quality and useful for experimentation, with the result that they commanded a rent almost double a similarly sized open field. Compounding this problem, many of the enclosures were split up into strips, with the result that ownership was unclear. Between 1776 and 1816, Coke rapidly bought strips of land near his estates and had them enclosed. Much of this came during the Napoleonic Wars when grain prices (and therefore farming profits) peaked. Coke was influenced by "Turnip" Townshend, who had owned a nearby estate and promoted crop rotation and farm improvement. Along with enclosure, marling and improved grasses, Townshend's improvements resulted in "a course of husbandry utterly unlike that practised a hundred years ago".

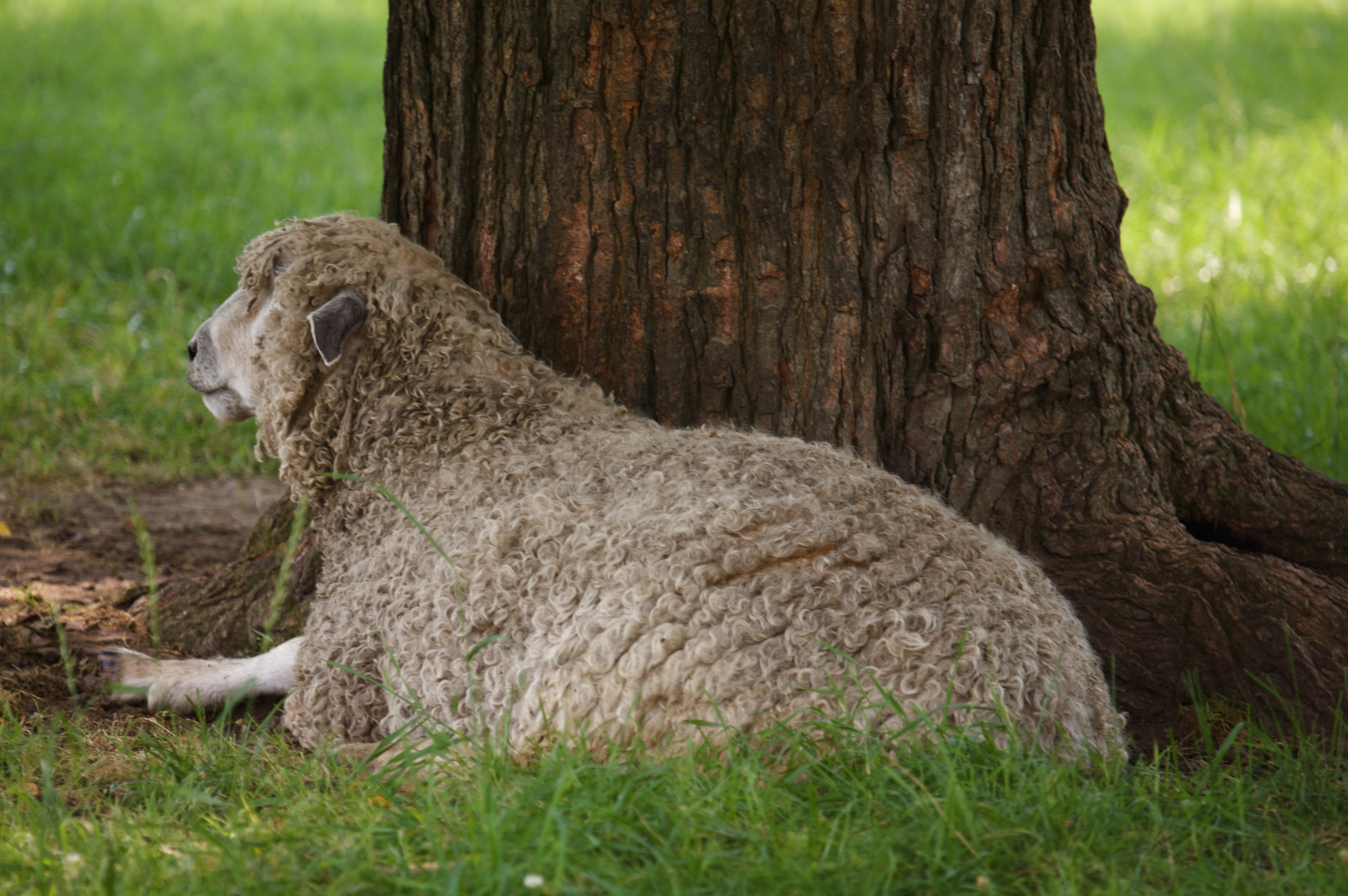
The English Leicester, a breed of sheep Coke introduced into Norfolk and cross-bred with the native Norfolk Horn

Coke's big improvements came in two areas; grasses and husbandry. He pioneered the use of cocksfoot and lucerne as grass and feed respectively, with the result that by 1793 he claimed to have 2,400 sheep in Holkham, as opposed to the 700 kept when he inherited the estates. The husbandry involved the milking comparisons of various types of cow, along with the first planting of Scottish turnips, which are "a good table vegetable being more palatable and nutritious and not so watery as the Norfolk variety". His prime area of experimentation was on the selective breeding for sheep. The most common sheep in the area was the Norfolk Horn, which was long-legged and slow to mature. Coke became a promoter of the English Leicester, a breed noted as fast-maturing and excellent when fed turnips. Coke cross-bred the two, with the resulting sheep being highly tame and superior to the pure Norfolk breed. Coke also bred cattle and used oxen for ploughing rather than horses, being the first to use them harnessed rather than yoked and winning a prize for his oxen in 1837.

Through sheep shearings, competitions and his contacts within the nobility, Coke soon spread his new ideas and breeds. Initially small events of local farmers, the shearings soon became 200-person formal dinners, rising to 300 people in 1821 and 700 soon after, with even the American ambassador Richard Rush attending in 1819, along with the French Consul and the Duke of Sussex. The Board of Agriculture was formed in 1793, with Coke sitting as one of the 30 "ordinary members" as a leading agriculturalist; he was made the vice-president in 1805. The board published a series of county reports for most of the United Kingdom, describing new farming measures being undertaken in various parts of the country.

Coke has been described as "the real hero of Norfolk agriculture", despite the fact that his land was so poor one critic is said to have remarked that "the thin sandy soil must be ploughed by rabbits yoked to a pocket knife". 19th and early 20th century historians held him to be the crucial figure of the British Agricultural Revolution. However, academics and writers dispute his importance. He is credited with inventing four-crop rotation which Naomi Riches has described as an "error", and R. A. C. Parker, writing in the Economic History Review, states that "many of the innovations he is supposed to have introduced should be attributed to his predecessors in Norfolk"; however that "is not to deny the substantial contribution of Coke himself to the advance of farming technique in England".

=== Further Parliamentary career ===
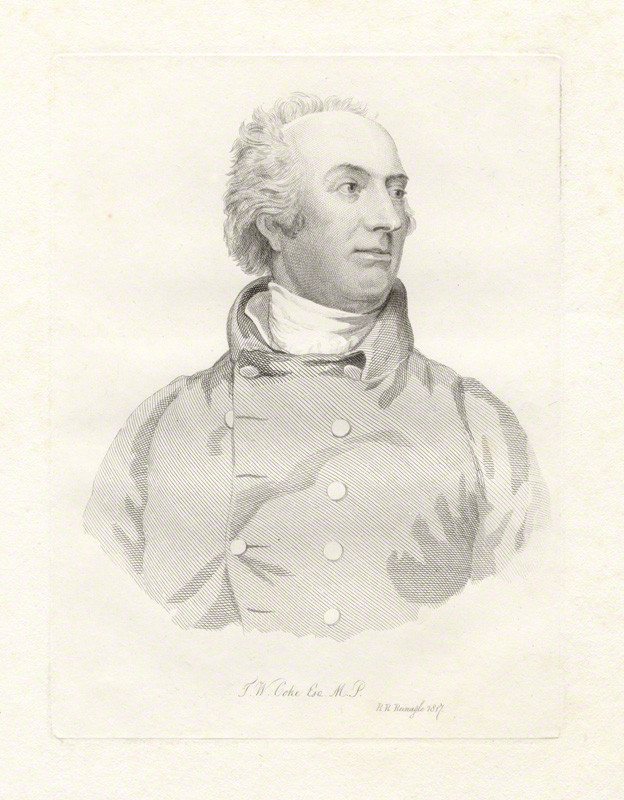
Coke in 1817

Coke was re-elected to Parliament in 1790, at a time of great political trouble. The French Revolution a year earlier had torn the Whig party in half, with Coke and Fox in the isolated minority who supported the revolutionaries as their acts became more brutal. With the declaration of war in 1793, an impact was finally felt in Britain with a rise in agricultural prices and rent. It also led to the establishment of local yeomanry forces to defend the country, something Coke opposed. This reduced his popularity in Norfolk and led to suspicions he might be a Jacobin, to the point where he was forced to publicly declare that he was not a Republican and "detested their principles". Eventually, in late September 1798, he raised the Holkham Yeoman Cavalry, commanding it as a Major, to defend against any invasion. This unit was dissolved in 1802 with the Peace of Amiens, but after war broke out again a year later more volunteer regiments were formed. Coke was notably absent from any preparations for defence, feeling that the risks of invasion were exaggerated, but was eventually persuaded by public opinion to reform the Yeoman Cavalry in 1803; it was again dissolved in 1805.

The French Revolution had split the Whigs into two factions, but as it progressed Fox's group in support of the revolutionaries began to dwindle. Coke stuck by Fox, and with the outbreak of the War, the split became finalised; Fox refused to accept that Britain need be involved in the conflict, as did Coke. In Parliament, Coke spoke out against the conflict, debating the motion to raise money for the war through a new tax in April 1794, and supporting Wilberforce's anti-war motion on 24 March 1795. He felt more comfortable with local matters, however, and his main concerns "were those of the agricultural interest", arguing against a new land tax and introducing a bill to shorten the shooting season, allowing for the production of more corn. Coke was again returned to Parliament in 1796, despite an anti-war and anti-government address to the electorate which was condemned as arrogant and dictatorial, but found on his return that the Foxites had agreed to withdraw from Parliamentary activity.

After Parliament was dissolved in June 1802, another election saw Coke again returned, although in a contested election that cost the candidates £35,000. With the death of William Pitt in 1806, the two Whig groups agreed to an alliance, which took the form of the Ministry of All the Talents; Fox was confirmed as Foreign Secretary, and Windham as Secretary for War and the Colonies. The government reportedly offered Coke a peerage, which he refused primarily to focus on abolishing Britain's involvement in the Atlantic slave trade, which was accomplished roughly a year after Fox's death on 13 September 1806. Fox's death made Parliament lose some of its appeal to Coke, as they had been close friends. His attendance in the next two years was very limited, and the next occasion of note was his support of the Corn Laws, which were highly unpopular in Norfolk and led to him being physically attacked by a mob in 1815.

With the defeat of Napoleon at the Battle of Waterloo, the wars in Europe ended, and the troops returned home. As a result, the nation underwent dramatic shifts due to rising unemployment as the economy shifted and the government began to pay off its debts incurred during 20 years of war. Agricultural prices slumped, and Coke became active in opposing tax increases which would impact on the farmers. In February 1816 he spoke out against income and malt tax, and in March attacked the property tax as "utterly at variance with civil liberty". An opponent of government excess in a time of unemployment and high taxation, he also voted against the army estimates and opposed the Civil List in May. With a County Meeting on 5 April 1817, Coke spoke on the King's intent on "overturning democracy and enslaving the country" by restricting freedom of speech and the press, suggesting that the government needed to be removed.

Returning to Parliament in 1818, he argued against the Royal Households Bill and introduced a Game Law Amendment Bill, which was defeated. Following the Peterloo Massacre and the government's introduction of a Seditious Meetings Prevention Bill, Coke accused the government of being "most strongly implicated in the events in Manchester", saying that the meeting would have been peaceful had it not been "interfered with by the officious agents of authority". The 1820s saw Coke speak far less; firstly, because of the continued Tory domination of Parliament, and secondly because of his remarriage. In 1822, at the age of 68 and after 21 years as a widower, he married Anne Keppel, the daughter of Lord Albemarle, and Coke's 18-year-old godchild. Anne had initially been brought to Holkham to partner with his nephew William, who due to Coke's lack of sons would inherit the estate, but they failed to get on. Anne and Coke's marriage was met with bemusement, and described as "absurd", but despite opposition took place on 26 February. Soon after the wedding, Anne became pregnant, and their son Thomas was born on 22 December.

In 1831, Coke's personal friend Earl Grey became Prime Minister; as a result, Coke's appearances in Parliament became more regular. He expressed delight at the Great Reform Act 1832, although he only spoke on the subject once, and chose its passage on 4 June 1832 as the appropriate moment to retire as an MP. As the "greatest commoner in England", Coke finally accepted a peerage in July 1837 (having been offered one six times before), becoming the Earl of Leicester. He took no pleasure in attending the House of Lords, however, describing it as "the hospital for incurables".

== Death ==
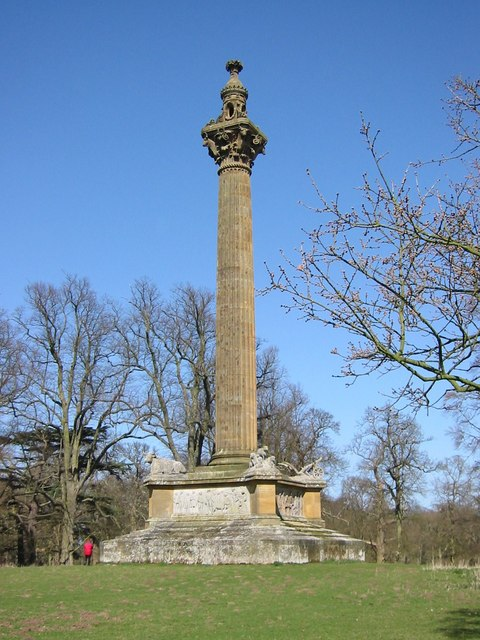
Coke monument, Holkham Hall

Coke remained in the prime of life after his retirement; records show him killing 24 deer with 25 shots at the age of 79, and having another child three years later. A portrait painted of him which appears to be of a man 20 years younger, is according to Stirling "no flattering likeness", but instead completely accurate. After a short and painful illness while visiting his estate (and childhood home) at Longford Hall, Derbyshire, Coke died in the early hours of 30 June 1842 at the age of 88; his last words were reported to be "well, perhaps I have talked too much". The body lay in state for two days, with the funeral procession finally setting out on 7 July. It travelled through King's Lynn, where black flags of mourning were flown and thousands came to pay their respects. On the final leg of the journey, with a funeral procession two miles in length led by 150 Holkham tenants on horseback and followed by several hundreds of private carriages, 200 gentlemen on horseback, riding two abreast, and lastly, a long train of neighbours, tenants and yeomen, Coke was eventually buried at the family mausoleum in Tittleshall on 11 July. Immediately after Coke's death, a committee formed to create a monument to him; over a thousand subscribers contributed £5,000. The eventual Coke Monument, found in the grounds of Holkham Hall, was designed by William Donthorne and finally completed in 1851. Wilhelmina Stirling wrote a 2-volume Life of Thomas William Coke.

The earldom and the Holkham estate passed to his son Thomas.

== Family ==
By his first wife Jane Dutton he had three daughters:

- Lady Jane Elizabeth Coke (1777–1863), married first Charles Howard, Viscount Andover (1775–1800), son of John Howard, 15th Earl of Suffolk; married second Admiral Sir Henry Digby (1770–1842). They had two sons, including Edward Digby, 9th Baron Digby, and one daughter, the socialite and adventuress Jane Digby.
- Lady Anne Margaret Coke (1779–1843), married Thomas Anson, 1st Viscount Anson. They had three sons and four daughters. One of whom was Thomas William Anson, 1st Earl of Lichfield.
- Lady Elizabeth Wilhelmina Coke (1795–1873), married John Spencer Stanhope. They had two sons and four daughters. One son, Walter married Julia Buxton, daughter of Sir John Buxton, 2nd Baronet. One of their daughters, Elizabeth, married Rev. Richard St John Tyrwhitt.

With his second wife, Lady Anne Amelia Keppel (daughter of William Keppel, 4th Earl of Albemarle), they had four sons and one daughter:

- Thomas William Coke, 2nd Earl of Leicester of Holkham (1822–1909)
- Capt. Hon. Edward Keppel Coke (1824–1889). He was an M.P. for West Norfolk from 1847 to 1852. He married Diana Mary Blanche Georgiana Agar-Ellis, daughter of George James Welbore Agar-Ellis, 1st Baron Dover. They had no issue.
- Henry John Coke (1827–1916). He married Lady Katherine Grey Egerton, daughter of Thomas Grosvenor Egerton, 2nd Earl of Wilton of Wilton Castle and Lady Mary Margaret Stanley on 22 July 1861. They had two sons and a daughter.
- Lt.-Col. Hon. Wenman Clarence Walpole Coke (1828–1907). After his service in the Crimean War, he was elected an MP for East Norfolk. The Coke's Hartebeest was named after him. He never married.
- Lady Margaret Sophia Coke (c. 1829–1868), married Sir Archibald Keppel Macdonald, 3rd Baronet, son of Sir James Macdonald, 2nd Baronet and Lady Sophia, daughter of William Keppel, 4th Earl of Albemarle. They had no issue.

Parliament of Great Britain
Preceded by Sir Edward Astley, Bt; Wenman Coke	Member of Parliament for Norfolk; 1776–1784; With: Sir Edward Astley, Bt	Succeeded by Sir Edward Astley, Bt; Sir John Wodehouse, Bt
Preceded by Sir Edward Astley, Bt; Sir John Wodehouse, Bt	Member of Parliament for Norfolk; 1790–1800; With: Sir John Wodehouse, Bt 1790–97; Jacob Henry Astley 1797–1800	Succeeded by Parliament of the United Kingdom
Parliament of the United Kingdom
Preceded by Parliament of Great Britain	Member of Parliament for Norfolk; 1801–1807; With: Jacob Henry Astley 1801–06; William Windham 1806–07	Succeeded by Edward Coke; Jacob Henry Astley, Bt.
Preceded by Edward Coke; William Cavendish	Member of Parliament for Derby; 1807; With: William Cavendish	Succeeded by William Cavendish; Edward Coke
Preceded by Edward Coke; Jacob Henry Astley, Bt.	Member of Parliament for Norfolk; 1807–1832; With: Jacob Henry Astley, Bt. 1807–17; Edmund Wodehouse 1817–30; Sir William Folkes, Bt 1830–32	Constituency abolished
Peerage of the United Kingdom
New creation	Earl of Leicester; 1837–1842	Succeeded by Thomas Coke
