= George Sanders (painter) =

Scottish portrait painter (1774–1846)

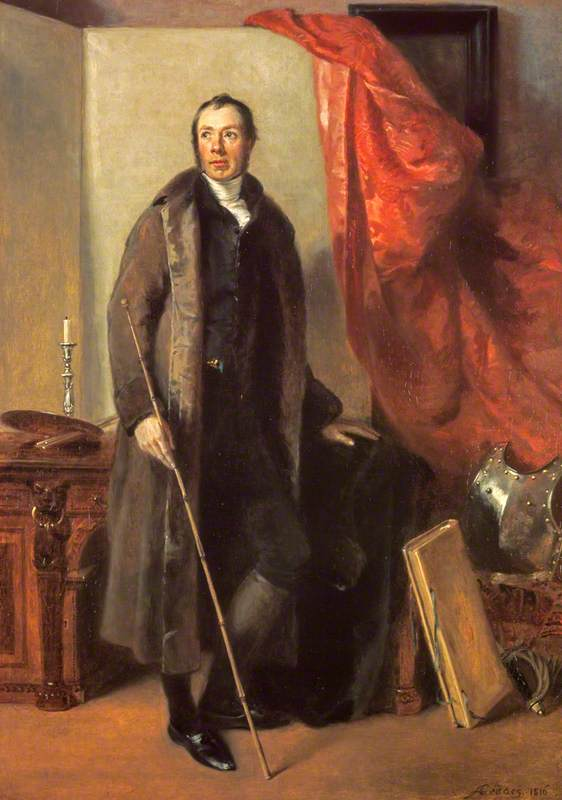
Sanders by Andrew Geddes, 1816

George Sanders (1774 – 26 March 1846) was a Scottish portrait painter.

== Biography ==
Sanders was born at Kinghorn, Fife, in 1774, and educated at Edinburgh. There he was apprenticed to a coach-painter named Smeaton, and afterwards practised as a miniature-painter and drawing-master, and designer of book illustrations. At that period he executed a panorama of Edinburgh taken from the guardship in Leith Roads. Before 1807 Sanders came to London, where, after working as a miniaturist for a few years, he established himself as a painter of life-sized portraits in oil. Though of limited abilities, he was for a time a very fashionable artist, and obtained high prices, as much as 800l. being paid for his portrait of Lord Londonderry. He usually represented his male sitters in fancy dress. His portraits of the Dukes of Buckingham, Devonshire, and Rutland, Lord Dover, Lord Falmouth, Jane Spencer-Churchill, Duchess of Marlborough, Mr. W. Cavendish, and Sir W. Forbes, were well engraved by J. Burnet, C. Turner, H. Meyer, and others.

Sanders painted several portraits of Lord Byron; one, dated 1807, was engraved whole-length by E. Finden as a frontispiece to his "Works," 1832, and half-length for Finden's "Illustrations to Lord Byron's Works," 1834; another, representing the poet standing by his boat, of which a plate by W. Finden was published in 1831, is well known. He also painted a miniature of Byron for his sister, Mrs. Leigh, which was engraved for the "Works," but cancelled at Byron's request. Sanders exhibited at the Royal Academy in 1834 only, sending then five portraits, which were severely criticised at the time. He frequently visited the continent, and made watercolour copies of celebrated pictures by Dutch and Flemish masters; twenty-three of these are now in the National Gallery of Scotland. He died at Allsop Terrace, New Road, London, on 26 March 1846.

George Sanders trained and introduced his niece Christina Robertson to a customer basis for her miniatures. She was to become a painter at the Russian court.

This Sanders has been confused with George Lethbridge Saunders (1807–1863), miniature-painter, frequently exhibiting at the Royal Academy between 1829 and 1853; he was living in 1856.

== Gallery ==
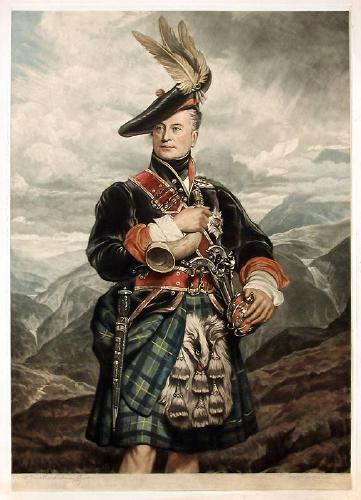

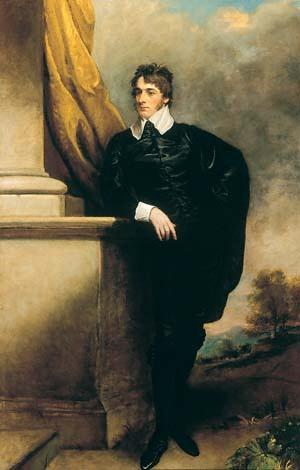

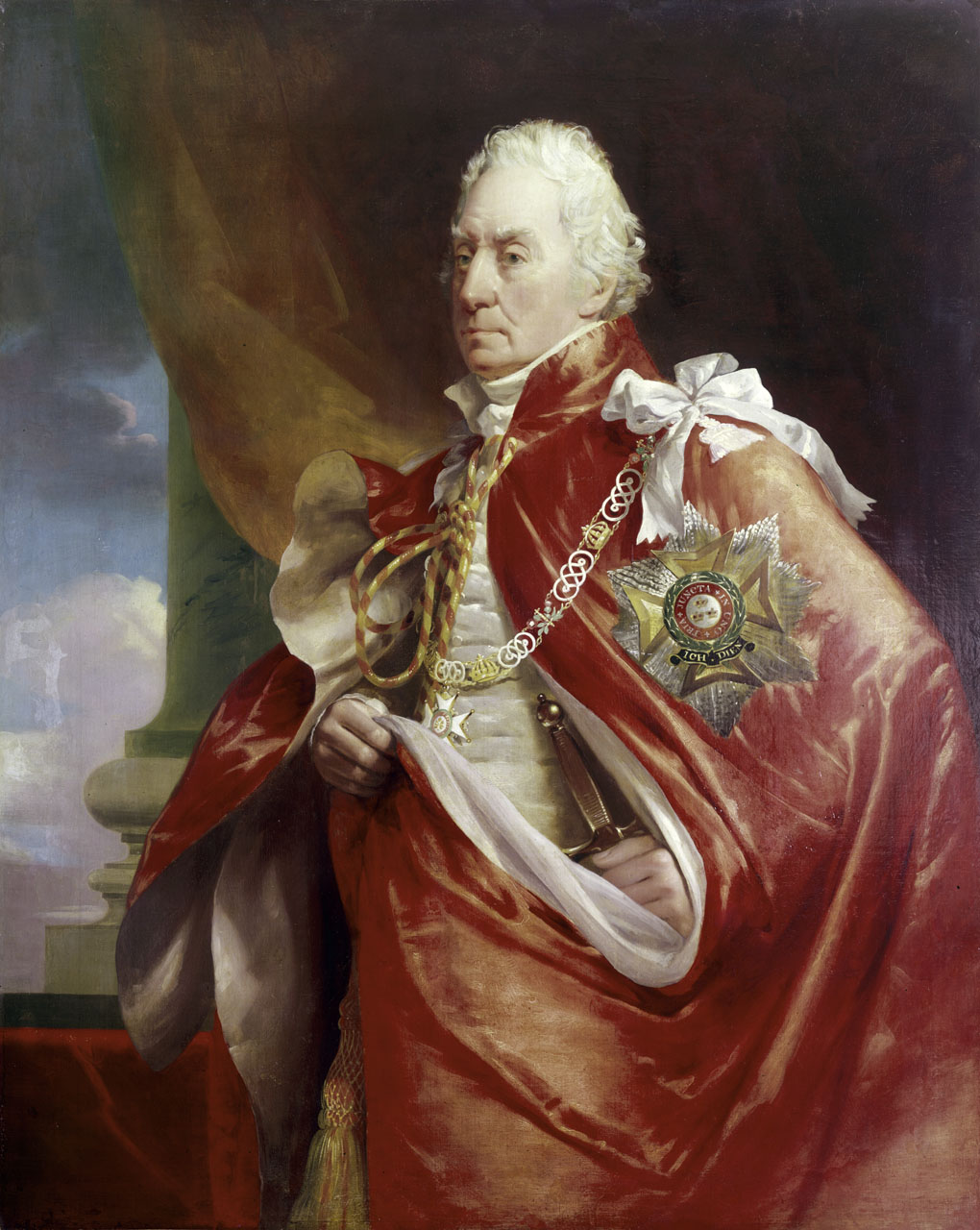

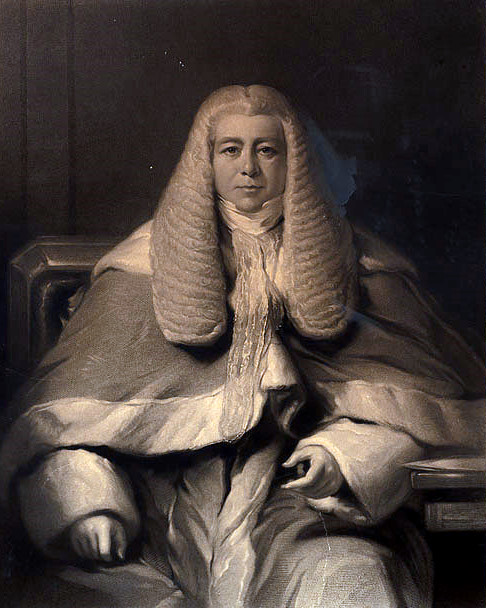

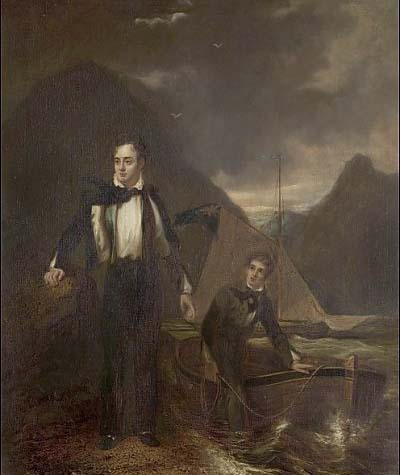
