= R. A. C. Parker =

British historian

- Born: Robert Alexander Clarke Parker; 15 June 1927; Barnsley, Yorkshire
- Died: 23 April 2001 (aged 73); Oxford, Oxfordshire
- Spouse: Julia Dixon

Academic background
- Education: Christ Church, Oxford

Academic work
- Discipline: History
- Institutions: University of Manchester (1952–1957); The Queen's College, Oxford (1957–1997)
- Main interests: Appeasement

Robert Alexander Clarke Parker (15 June 1927 – 23 April 2001) was a British historian who specialised in Britain's appeasement of Nazi Germany and the Second World War. Fellow historian Kenneth O. Morgan called him "perhaps the leading authority on the international crises of the 1930s, appeasement and the coming of war".

== Early life ==
Parker was born in Barnsley, Yorkshire to a family with Scottish roots, which Parker was proud of; he changed his first name to Alastair. He served in the Royal Navy during the Second World War and after the war's end won a scholarship to Christ Church, Oxford. He studied modern history, for which he gained a First. For his doctoral thesis, Parker studied Coke of Norfolk and the British Agricultural Revolution. The thesis was eventually published in 1975.

== Academic career ==
In 1952 Lewis Namier appointed Parker to a lectureship in history at Manchester University, a post he held until 1957. From 1957 until his retirement in 1997, he was a Fellow and tutor at The Queen's College, Oxford. His main area of historical study was Neville Chamberlain, Winston Churchill and the appeasement of Germany. He taught a special subject on the origins of the Second World War at The Queen's College.

In his 1997 work Chamberlain and Appeasement, Parker argued that Chamberlain did not pursue appeasement in order to buy time, as some of his defenders claimed. He added that Churchill's alternative strategy of an Anglo-French alliance was a realistic and more honourable course. In his last book, Churchill and Appeasement (2000), Parker noted what he considered to be Churchill's misjudgments over India and the Spanish Civil War but said Churchill was completely right on the threat from Nazi Germany and argued that Churchill's proposal of an Anglo-Soviet alliance might well have deterred Adolf Hitler if it had been adopted. He also edited a collection of essays on Churchill which were published in 1995.

Parker held Old Labour political views and canvassed for the Labour Party at elections.

== Works ==
- Europe: 1918-1945 (Weidenfeld & Nicolson, 1969; first published in 1967 in German as part of the series Fischer Weltgeschichte)
- Struggle for Survival: The History of the Second World War. Oxford, UK: Oxford University Press. 1989. ISBN 0192191268. (re-titled The Second World War in 1997 for paperback)
- Chamberlain and Appeasement (Palgrave Macmillan, 1993)
- Churchill and Appeasement: Could Churchill have prevented the Second World War? (Macmillan, 2000)
