= Gerard Lake, 1st Viscount Lake =

British general (1744–1808)

General The Right Honourable The Viscount Lake
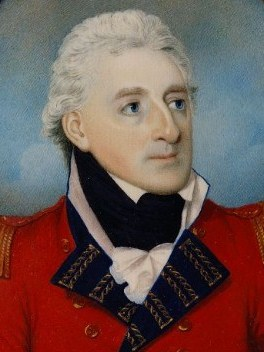

Member of Parliament for Aylesbury
- In office 1790–1802
- Preceded by: William Wrightson
- Succeeded by: Robert Bent

Personal details
- Born: 27 July 1744 Harrow, Middlesex, Great Britain
- Died: 20 February 1808 (aged 63) London, England
- Parent(s): Letitia Gumley, Lancelot Lake
- Education: Eton College

Military service
- Allegiance: Great Britain; United Kingdom
- Branch/service: British Army
- Years of service: 1758–1808
- Rank: General
- Battles/wars: American Revolutionary War; French Revolutionary Wars; Irish Rebellion of 1798; Second Anglo-Maratha War

Gerard Lake, 1st Viscount Lake (27 July 1744 – 20 February 1808) was a British general. He commanded British forces during the Irish Rebellion of 1798 and the Second Anglo-Maratha War. He later served as Commander-in-Chief of the military in British India.

== Background ==
He was the son of Lancelot Charles Lake (d. 1751) of Harrow-on-the-Hill and his wife Letitia Gumley, daughter of John Gumley. He was educated at Eton College.

Lake was appointed ensign in the 1st Regiment of Foot Guards on 9 May 1758, becoming lieutenant (captain in the army) in 1762, captain (lieutenant-colonel) in 1776, major in 1784, and lieutenant colonel in 1792, by which time he was a general officer in the army. He served with his regiment in Germany between 1760 and 1762, and with a composite battalion in the Battle of Yorktown of 1781. After this he was equerry to the Prince of Wales, afterwards George IV. His younger brother Warwick served as a groom of the bedchamber for the Prince, and later oversaw his stables of racehorses.

In 1790, he became a major-general, and in 1793 was appointed to command the Guards Brigade in the Duke of York and Albany's army in Flanders during the French Revolutionary Wars. He was in command at the successful Battle of Lincelles on 18 August 1793, and served on the continent (except for a short time when seriously ill) until April 1794. He later sold his lieutenant-colonelcy in the guards, and became colonel of the 53rd Regiment of Foot and governor of Limerick in Ireland. In 1797, he was promoted to lieutenant-general.

== American War of Independence ==
As lieutenant-colonel Lake went out with drafts to America in the spring of 1781, made the campaign in North Carolina under Lord Cornwallis, and commanded the grenadiers of the guards and of the old 80th royal Edinburgh regiment in a sortie, under Colonel Robert Abercromby, from the British lines at York Town, which inflicted heavy loss on the French and American besiegers, on 11 October. After the surrender of Cornwallis's force on 19 October 1781, Lake remained prisoner on parole until the end of the war. Hugh Wodehouse Pearse reports that "Lake was one of the three field officers selected by lot to take charge of the troops in captivity, but, as he was anxious for private reasons to proceed to England, Major Gordon of the 76th [sic] [80th] Regiment generously volunteered to take his place. Major, then Lieut.-Colonel, Gordon died in captivity.

== 1798 rebellion in Ireland ==
In December 1796, he was appointed commander in Ulster and issued a proclamation ordering the surrender of all arms by the civil population, during which time he was 'untroubled by legal restraints or by his troops' violent actions'. Historians have generally seen Lake's Dragooning of Ulster in 1797 as effective in disarming and crippling the Society of United Irishmen in that province, although his effectiveness has been questioned. Lake succeeded Sir Ralph Abercromby as Commander-in-Chief, Ireland in April 1798 and turned his attention to Leinster, where 'public floggings and torture of suspected rebels became widespread and added to the general atmosphere of terror'. Rather than cowing the province into submission, 'his crude methods probably contributed to the outbreak of insurrection' in May 1798. Lake continued to deal harshly with opposition, and issued orders to take no prisoners during the rebellion.

A mannequin of General Lake at the National 1798 Rebellion Centre standing at a table studying a campaign map

In May, Lake commanded troops in County Kildare, and, after the unsuccessful rebel attack on Naas on 24 May, he assisted General Ralph Dundas in ensuring the rebel surrender after the Battle of Kilcullen, which Dundas arranged on humane terms. Another rebel force on the nearby Curragh were also persuaded to surrender, but while this was being arranged by Lake the rebels were mistakenly attacked by separate government forces coming from the opposite direction, resulting in the Gibbet Rath executions on 29 May. As a result, central Kildare remained quiet for the rest of 1798.

Lake then took overall command of a force of some 20,000 troops to crush the Wexford rebels and defeated the main rebel army at Vinegar Hill (near Enniscorthy, County Wexford) on 21 June. His harsh treatment towards Irish rebels found bearing arms brought him into conflict with Lord Cornwallis who was appointed Lord Lieutenant of Ireland in June 1798 and instituted an amnesty act to encourage rebels to lay down their arms.

Cornwallis sent Lake to oppose a French expedition of 1,000 troops which had landed at Killala Bay, County Mayo on 23 August. On 29 August, Lake arrived at Castlebar, where a force of 1,700 (composed of mainly of militia, fencibles and yeomanry) was located, and witnessed the rout of his troops under General Hely-Hutchinson (afterwards 2nd Earl of Donoughmore) at the Battle of Castlebar. In total, around 4,000 British and Irish Royal troops took part in this battle. Lake failed to rally his largely inexperienced troops and was forced to retreat to Tuam; the speed of which (and abandonment of material, artillery and Lake's personal baggage) led the rout to become known as the 'Races of Castlebar'. Hely-Hutchinson shouldered much of the blame, but it was accepted that Lake's troops were inexperienced and a head-on battle with the seasoned French force was probably to be avoided. However, rumours also abounded that Lake had been drinking heavily the night before the battle and was only woken with difficulty while the French were already attacking.

He defeated the French at the Battle of Ballinamuck on 8 September.

== Indian campaigns ==
In 1799, Lake returned to England, and soon afterwards travelled to British India where he was appointed Commander-in-Chief. He took up his duties at Calcutta in July 1801, and applied himself to the improvement of the East India Company army, especially in the direction of making all arms, infantry, cavalry and artillery, more mobile and more manageable. In 1802 he was made a full general.

On the outbreak the Second Anglo-Maratha War in 1803 General Lake took the field against Daulat Scindia, and within two months defeated the Marathas at Kol (now called Aligarh), after storming Aligarh Fort during the Battle of Ally Ghur (1 September 1803). He then took Delhi (11 September) and Agra (10 October), and won a victory at the Battle of Laswari (1 November), where the power of Scindia was completely broken with the loss of 31 disciplined battalions, trained and officered by Frenchmen, and 426 pieces of ordnance. This defeat, followed a few days later by Major-General Arthur Wellesley's victory at the Battle of Argaon, compelled Scindia to come to terms, and a treaty was signed in December 1803.

Operations continued against Yashwantrao Holkar, who, on 17 November 1804, defeated Lake at the Battle of Farrukhabad. Lake was now very frustrated by the Jats and Yashwantrao Holker at Bharatpur which held out against five assaults early in 1805. Cornwallis succeeded Lord Wellesley as Governor-General of India in July of that year – superseding Lake at the same time as commander-in-chief – and determined to put an end to the war. Cornwallis, however, died in October of the same year and Lake pursued Holkar into the Punjab. However, after seeing the stronger position of Holkar and his effort to gather all Indian princes under one flag against the British, the British East India Company signed a peace treaty with Holkar which returned to him all his territory and promised no further interference from the Company.

Lord Wellesley in a despatch attributed much of the success of the war to Lake's matchless energy, ability and valour. For his services, Lake received the thanks of Parliament, and, in September 1804, was rewarded by being created Baron Lake of Delhi and Laswary and of Aston Clinton in the County of Buckingham. From 1801 to 1805 Lake was Commander-in-Chief, India, then again from 1805 to 1807 as his successor John Graves Simcoe had died before heading off to India. At the conclusion of the war he returned to England, and in 1807 he was created Viscount Lake of Delhi and Laswary and of Aston Clinton in the County of Buckingham.

One of his sons Major George Augustus Frederick Lake accompanied him in Ireland and then India, acting as his aide-de-camp and military secretary during the campaign: at one stage offering his mount when the elder Lake's horse had been shot from under him at an engagement near the village of Mohaulpoor. Minutes after seeing his father mounted Major Lake was seriously wounded in the presence of his father. Lake recovered from his wound and went on to command the 29th Regiment of Foot during the Peninsular Campaign. He was killed in action at the Battle of Roliça, Portugal on 17 August 1808.

== Parliamentary career ==
Lake pursued both a parliamentary and military career. He represented Aylesbury in the British House of Commons from 1790 to 1802, and he also was brought into the Irish House of Commons by the government as member for Armagh Borough in 1799 to vote for the Act of Union.

== Later years ==
Lake was recorded as being an inveterate gambler who lost most of his family's fortune. He died in London on 20 February 1808 leaving his children with little or no inheritance. This was seen by many at court and the then prime minister the Duke of Portland, as a sad end for such a stalwart of Empire and his children. Portland made a special request to King George III to remedy the situation, particularly with respect to the unmarried Lake daughters.

== Notes ==
Parliament of Great Britain
Preceded by William Wrightson; Scrope Bernard	Member of Parliament for Aylesbury; 1790–1801; With: Scrope Bernard	Succeeded by Parliament of the United Kingdom
Parliament of Ireland
Preceded by Hon. Thomas Pelham; Patrick Duigenan	Member of Parliament for Armagh Borough; 1799–1801; With: Patrick Duigenan	Succeeded by Parliament of the United Kingdom
Parliament of the United Kingdom
Preceded by Parliament of Great Britain	Member of Parliament for Aylesbury; 1801–1802; With: Scrope Bernard	Succeeded by James Du Pre; Robert Bent
Military offices
Preceded by Robert Dalrymple-Horn-Elphinstone	Colonel of the 53rd (Shropshire) Regiment of Foot; 1794–1796	Succeeded by Welbore Ellis Doyle
Preceded by William Medows	Colonel of the 73rd (Highland) Regiment of Foot; 1796–1800	Succeeded by George Harris, 1st Baron Harris
Preceded by Sir Ralph Abercromby	Commander-in-Chief, Ireland; April 1798 – June 1798	Succeeded by The Marquess Cornwallis
Preceded by Sir James Craig	Commander-in-Chief, India; 1801–1805	Succeeded by The Marquess Cornwallis
Preceded by The Marquess Cornwallis	Commander-in-Chief, India; 1805–1807	Succeeded by Sir George Hewett
Preceded by The Earl of Chatham	Governor of Plymouth; 1807–1808	Succeeded by The Viscount Howe
Peerage of the United Kingdom
New creation	Viscount Lake; 1807–1808	Succeeded by Francis Lake
New creation	Baron Lake; 1804–1808	Succeeded by Francis Lake
