= Sir Thomas Bernard, 3rd Baronet =

English social reformer (1750–1818)

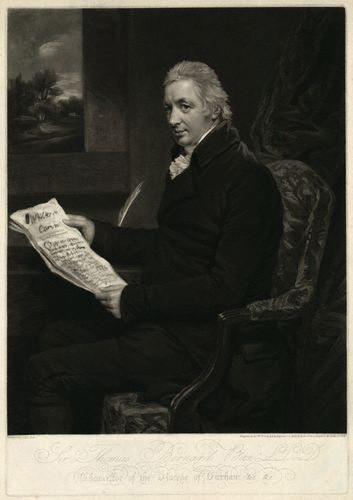
Sir Thomas Bernard, 3rd Baronet

Sir Thomas Bernard, 3rd Baronet (27 April 1750 – 1 July 1818) was an English social reformer whose father, as governor of the Province of New Jersey (1758–1760) and Province of Massachusetts Bay (1760–1770), played a responsible part in directing the British policy which led to the revolt of the American colonies.

== Life ==
He was born at Lincoln, the younger son of Sir Francis Bernard, 1st Baronet. Rather late in his life, on the death of his elder brother in 1810, Bernard succeeded to the baronetcy conferred on his father in 1768.

His early education was obtained at Harvard College, in which his father took a great interest. He then acted as confidential secretary to his father during the troubles which led (1769) to the governor's recall, and accompanied Sir Francis to England, where he was called to the bar, and practised as a conveyancer.

He married a rich wife, and acquired a considerable fortune, and then devoted most of his time to social work for the benefit of the poor. From 1795 to 1806 he was treasurer of the Foundling Hospital for abandoned babies, in the concerns of which he took an important part. After his treasurership, he continued to play a role on the charity's Court of Governors holding the honorary title of Vice President, but resigned when taking on the baronetcy in 1810. He also helped to establish in 1796 the "Society for Bettering the Condition and Increasing the Comforts of the Poor," in 1800 a school for indigent blind, and in 1801 a fever institution. He was a founding Director of the British Institution in 1805.

He was active in promoting vaccination, improving the conditions of child labour, advocating rural allotments, and agitating against the salt duties. He took great interest in education, and with Count Rumford he was an originator of the Royal Institution in London. He died without issue on 1 July 1818.

Sir Thomas was also a Director and leading proponent of the Regent's Canal. He was approached in 1811 by John Nash (architect), the architect, who was a leading advocate of the canal and was present at the Percy Street Meeting, on 31 May 1811 at which a steering committee was set up to plan the building of a canal across north London. Social reformers favoured canals in this period because they greatly reduced the price of coal for the poor, and at that time gas lighting was also being adopted, using gas made from coal. Gas lighting was cheaper than candles. Sir Thomas played a prominent part in the management of the troubled canal throughout his remaining years. In 1818 it was he who finally settled a long-running acrimonious dispute with William Agar of Elm Lodge, whose determined opposition and clever but awkward behaviour had frustrated the canal's construction. He died just a few weeks after his moment of greatest success when he had resolved this major difficulty by negotiation, so he did not live to see the canal completed.

He was buried beneath the chapel of the Foundling Hospital, London, which was demolished in 1928.

Baronetage of Great Britain
Preceded by John Bernard	Baronet (of Nettleham); 1809–1818	Succeeded by Scrope Bernard-Morland
