= Henry Cavendish (British Army officer) =

General The Honourable Henry Cavendish
- Born: Henry Frederick Compton Cavendish; 5 November 1789; Westminster, London
- Died: 5 April 1873 (aged 83); Westminster, London
- Spouse(s): Sarah Fawkener (m.1811–1817), Frances Susan Lambton (m.1819, died 1840), Susanna Emma Byerlie (m.1873–his death)
- Military career
- Allegiance: United Kingdom
- Branch: British Army
- Rank: General
- Conflicts: Napoleonic Wars

General Henry Frederick Compton Cavendish (5 November 1789 – 5 April 1873) was a British Army officer, politician and courtier.

== Early life and career ==
Cavendish was born in Westminster, the third son of George Cavendish, 1st Earl of Burlington and Lady Elizabeth Compton, daughter and heiress of the 7th Earl of Northampton. Cavendish was educated at Eton College and Trinity College, Cambridge. He was commissioned as a lieutenant in the 10th Dragoons in 1808 and was deployed to Spain and was wounded at the Battle of Corunna in January 1809 during the Peninsular War. In 1812 he entered Parliament for Derby, a seat which he held until 1834. In 1837, he was appointed Chief Equerry and Clerk Marshal to Queen Victoria, but resigned the post in 1841. On 2 June 1853 he was appointed colonel of The Queen's Bays, a post he held until his death. He was promoted to major-general in 1846, lieutenant-general in 1854 and full general in 1862.

He was uncle to William Cavendish, 7th Duke of Devonshire.

== Marriages and issue ==
He married three times:

Firstly, on 24 October 1811, he married Sarah Fawkener (27 May 1789 – November 1817), daughter of William Augustus Fawkener. She inherited £40,000 from her father. They had four children:

- Elizabeth Georgiana Harriett Cavendish (12 January 1812 – 3 January 1892), married first William Bernard Harcourt, Marquis d'Harcourt, and second Lt.-Gen. James Robertson Craufurd
- Sarah Mary Compton Cavendish (27 August 1813 – 21 April 1881), married John Campbell, 2nd Earl Cawdor and had issue
- Rachel Cavendish (1815 – 31 July 1816)
- Lt.-Col. William Henry Frederick Cavendish (31 October 1817 – 11 March 1881), married Lady Emily Augusta Lambton, daughter of John Lambton, 1st Earl of Durham, and had issue

On 16 June 1819, he married secondly, Frances Susan Lambton (died 23 November 1840), daughter of William Henry Lambton, sister of John Lambton, 1st Earl of Durham and widow of Frederick Howard (killed in action at Waterloo). They had six children:

- Francis William Henry Cavendish (6 February 1820 – 12 January 1893), married firstly, Lady Eleanor FitzGibbon, daughter of Richard FitzGibbon, 3rd Earl of Clare, and married second Ianthe Skyring, with issue by both.
- Henry Charles Lambton Cavendish (7 May 1821 – 6 October 1839)
- Rev. Charles William Cavendish (24 September 1822 – 21 December 1890), married first Felicia Susan Lygon, daughter of Henry Lygon, 4th Earl Beauchamp, without issue, married second Louisa Cockburn, natural daughter of Sir Alexander Cockburn, 12th Baronet, with issue, and married third Mary Gregg, with issue.
- George Henry Cavendish (9 January 1824 – 21 January 1889), married Emily Victorine Elizabeth Rumbold, Freifrau von Delmar, daughter of Sir William Rumbold, 3rd Baronet, and had issue
- Augustus John Cavendish (13 September 1825 – 2 October 1825)
- Caroline Fanny Cavendish (11 November 1826 – 25 January 1910), maid of honour to Queen Victoria, member of the Royal Order of Victoria and Albert, fourth class

On 28 January 1873, he married Susanna Emma Byerlie (died c. 1910), and died two months later.

Parliament of the United Kingdom
Preceded by William Cavendish; Edward Coke	Member of Parliament for Derby; 1812–1835; With: Edward Coke 1812–1818; Thomas Wenman Coke 1818–1826; Samuel Crompton 1826–1830; Edward Strutt 1830–1835	Succeeded by Edward Strutt; Lord Ponsonby
Military offices
Preceded by Sir Thomas Montresor	Colonel of the 2nd Dragoon Guards (Queen's Bays); 1853–1873	Succeeded by Sir Henry Dalrymple White
