= William Wrightson (MP for Aylesbury) =

British landowner and politician

William Wrightson (20 May 1752 – 25 December 1827), of Cusworth, Yorkshire, was a British landowner and politician who sat in the House of Commons from 1784 to 1790.

Wrightson was the son of John Battie originally of Sprotborough, Yorkshire and his wife Isabella Wrightson, daughter of William Wrightson of Cusworth Hall. Battie took name of Wrightson in 1766 on inheriting Cusworth Hall). Wrightson was educated at Christ Church, Oxford and Lincoln's Inn and succeeded his father to the Cusworth estate in 1785.

Wrightson was elected MP for Aylesbury at the 1784 British general election, sitting until 1790. He was appointed High Sheriff of Yorkshire for 1819–20.

Wrightson died on Christmas Day, 1827. He had married twice: firstly Barbara, the daughter of James Bland of Hurworth, County Durham and secondly Henrietta, the daughter and coheiress of Richard Heber of Marton Hall, Yorkshire. His eldest son by his second wife was William Battie-Wrightson, at various times MP for East Retford, Kingston upon Hull and Northallerton.

Parliament of Great Britain
Preceded by Anthony Bacon; Thomas Orde-Powlett	Member of Parliament for Aylesbury; 1784–1790; With: Sir Thomas Hallifax 1784–89; Scrope Bernard from 1789	Succeeded by Scrope Bernard; Gerard Lake
