= Edward Coke (1758–1836) =

British politician

Edward Coke (1758–29 Jul 1836), born Edward Roberts, was a British politician and landowner.

Edward was the second son of Wenman Coke and younger brother of Thomas Coke, the celebrated "Coke of Norfolk" and later Earl of Leicester. He was High Sheriff of Derbyshire in 1819.

He married Grace Colhoun in 1792, and they had three children:

- Thomas William Coke (born 1793)
- Edward Ralph Coke (born 1795)
- Eliza Grace Coke (born 1797), married Henry Venables-Vernon, son of Henry Venables-Vernon, 3rd Baron Vernon

His principal interests were in Derbyshire, where he lived at Longford Hall, and he was Member of Parliament for Derby from 1780 until 1817, with a brief interruption in 1807 to substitute for his brother in Norfolk.

Parliament of Great Britain
Preceded by Lord Frederick Cavendish; Daniel Parker Coke	Member of Parliament for Derby; 1780–1801; With: Lord George Cavendish 1780–1797; George Walpole 1797–1801	Succeeded by Parliament of the United Kingdom
Parliament of the United Kingdom
Preceded by Parliament of Great Britain	Member of Parliament for Derby; 1801–1807; With: George Walpole 1801–1806; William Cavendish 1806–1807	Succeeded by William Cavendish; Thomas Coke
Parliament of the United Kingdom
Preceded by Thomas Coke; William Windham	Member of Parliament for Norfolk; 1807; With: Jacob Henry Astley	Succeeded by Jacob Henry Astley; Thomas Coke
Preceded by William Cavendish; Thomas Coke	Member of Parliament for Derby; 1807–1818; With: William Cavendish 1807–1812; Henry Frederick Compton Cavendish 1812–1818	Succeeded by Henry Frederick Compton Cavendish; Thomas Wenman Coke
Honorary titles
Preceded by John Gillardot	High Sheriff of Derbyshire; 1819	Succeeded by Francis Mundy
