= George Cavendish (Aylesbury MP) =

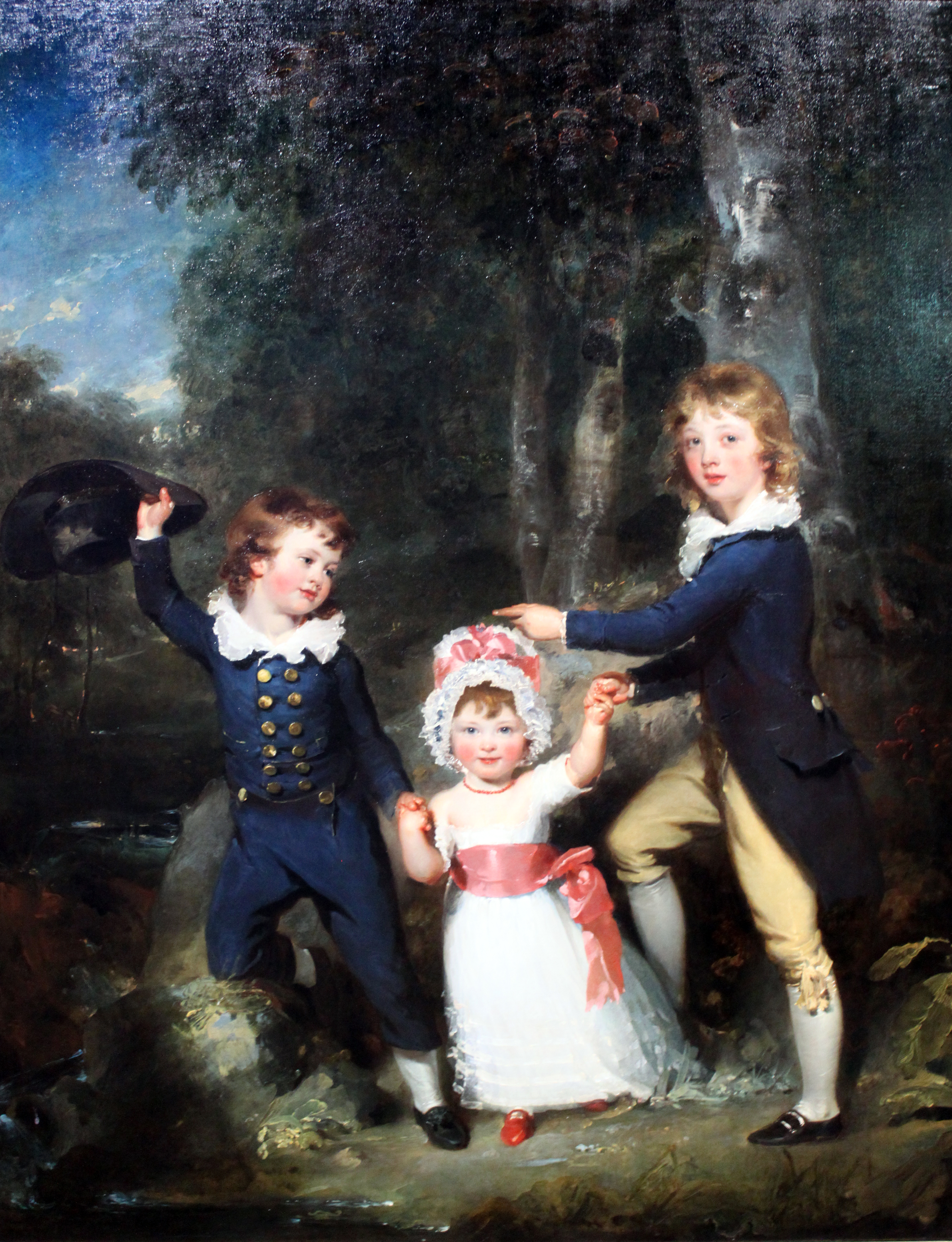
Portrait of the Children of Lord George Cavendish, 1790, by Sir Thomas Lawrence, showing George at left

George Henry Compton Cavendish (14 October 1784 – 22 January 1809) was an English Whig politician and British Army officer, the son of Lord George Cavendish, later Earl of Burlington. He was educated at Eton College.

He was commissioned Cornet in the 7th Dragoons in 1801, and subsequently promoted to Lieutenant in 1802, Captain in 1804, and Major in 1808, when in the latter year he joined his regiment serving in the Peninsular War. He was evacuated from Corunna but was drowned at the age of 24 when his transport ship, HMS Primrose (1807), sank in a storm off the Cornwall coast in January 1809 on arrival in British waters.

He served as MP for the borough of Aylesbury from 1806 until his death in 1809, predeceasing his father.

Parliament of the United Kingdom
Preceded by James Du Pre; William Cavendish	Member for Aylesbury; 1806–1809; With: Sir George Nugent, Bt	Succeeded by Sir George Nugent, Bt; Thomas Hussey
