= George Cavendish, 1st Earl of Burlington =

British politician

The Right Honourable The Earl of Burlington
- 1st Earl of Burlington
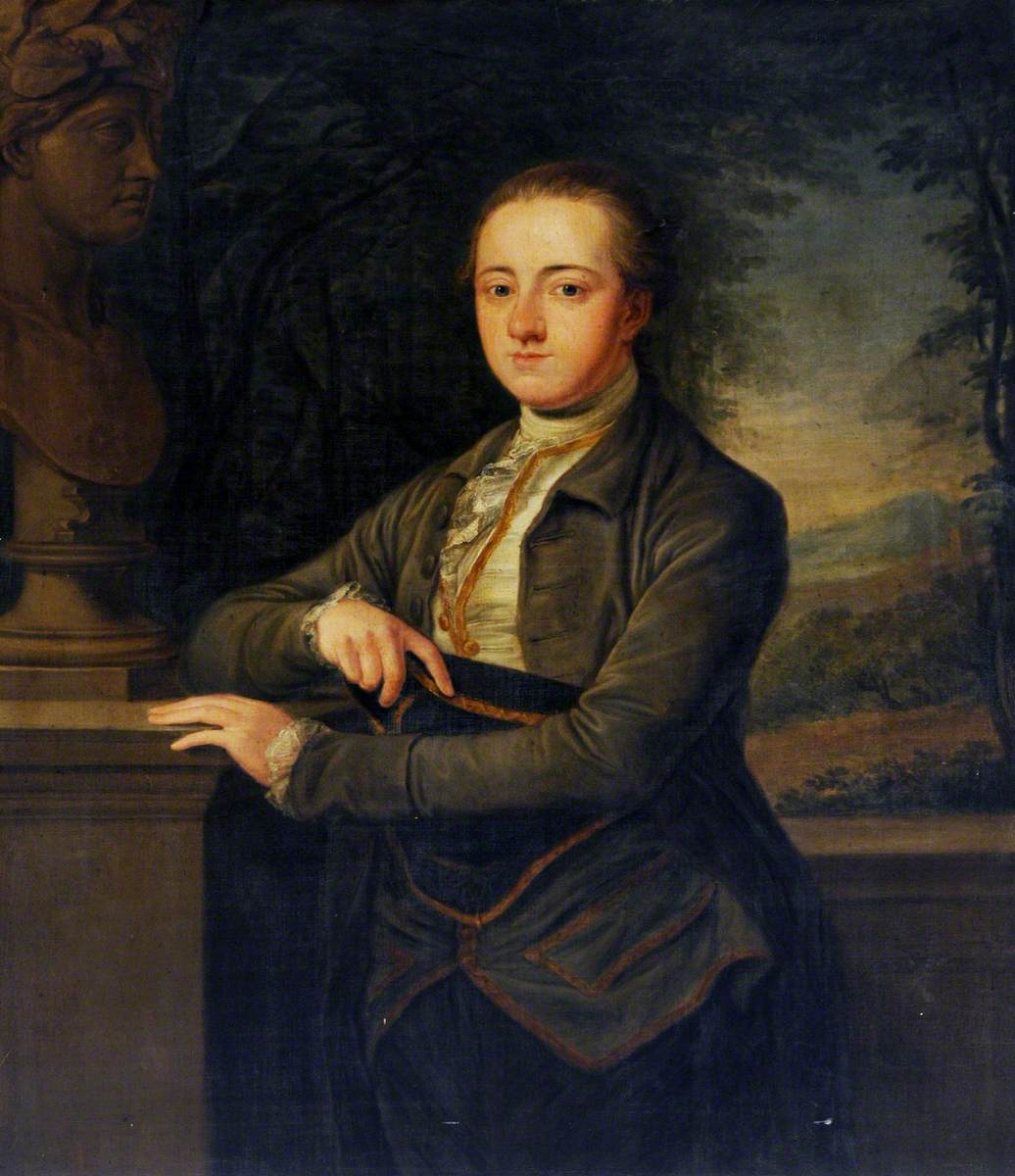
- Lord Cavendish, 1st Earl of Burlington
- Born: 31 March 1754
- Died: 9 May 1834 (aged 80); Burlington House, London, England
- Spouse: Lady Elizabeth Compton (m. 1782)
- Issue: William Cavendish; George Cavendish; Elizabeth Dorothy Cavendish; Lady Anne Cavendish; The Hon. Henry Cavendish; Elizabeth Cavendish; Charles Cavendish, 1st Baron Chesham; Lady Caroline Cavendish; Frederick Cavendish; Charlotte Cavendish
- Parents: William Cavendish, 4th Duke of Devonshire; Charlotte Boyle, 6th Baroness Clifford

George Cavendish, 1st Earl of Burlington (31 March 1754 – 9 May 1834), styled Lord George Cavendish before 1831, was a British nobleman and politician. He built Burlington Arcade.

== Background ==
Cavendish was the third son of William Cavendish, 4th Duke of Devonshire and the former Lady Charlotte Boyle, daughter of Richard Boyle, 3rd Earl of Burlington of the first creation, whose title had become extinct upon his death in 1753.

In 1783 his elder brother as Lord Lieutenant of Derbyshire commissioned him as colonel of the Derbyshire Militia, a position he held until he was succeeded by Lord Waterpark in 1832.

== Political career ==
Cavendish sat as Member of Parliament for Knaresborough from 1775 to 1780, for Derby from 1780 to 1797 and for Derbyshire from 1797 to 1831. On 10 September 1831 he was raised to the peerage as Baron Cavendish of Keighley, in the County of York, and Earl of Burlington, a revival of the title held by his maternal grandfather.

== Horseracing ==
He had horseracing interests. His racing silks were straw colour with a black cap.

== Family ==
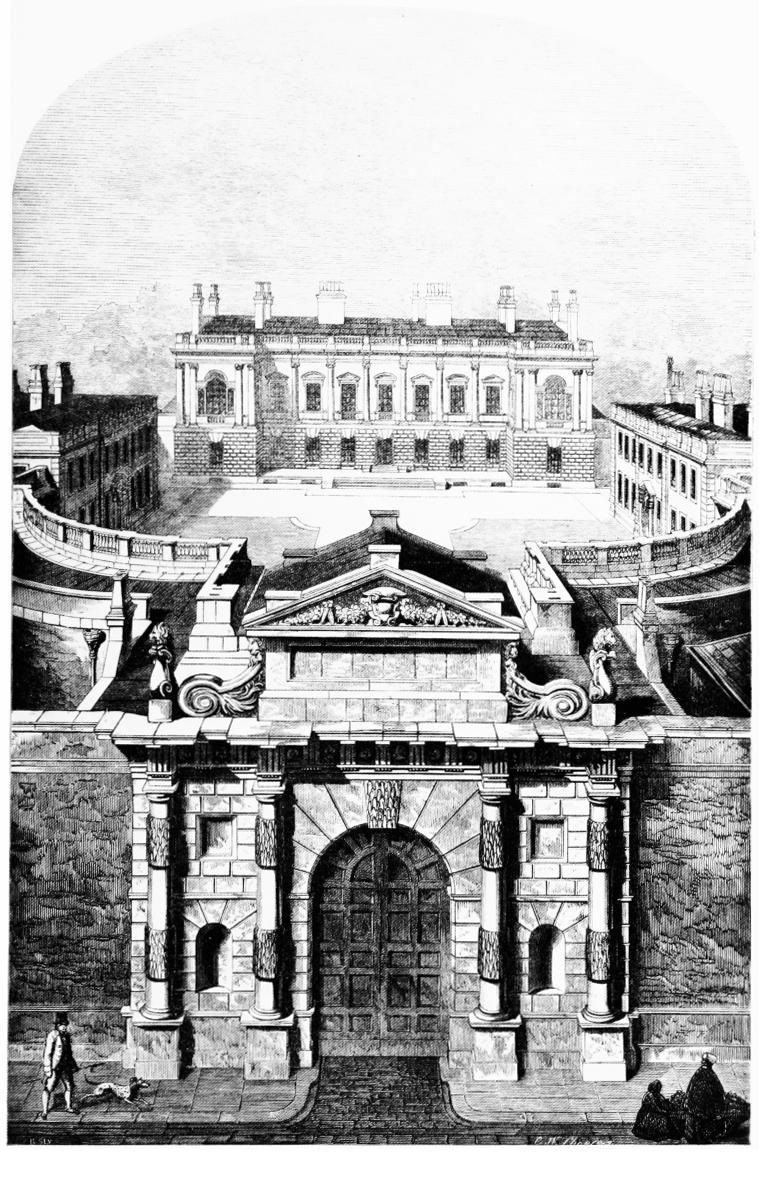
Burlington House c.1854

In 1815, Lord Burlington bought Burlington House in Piccadilly from his nephew, the 6th Duke of Devonshire. With the architect Samuel Ware, he made a number of significant modifications to the house, including the building of Burlington Arcade along the west side. He died at Burlington House in 1834 and was buried in All Saints' Church, Derby. The property passed to his widow and on her death in 1835 to their son Charles.

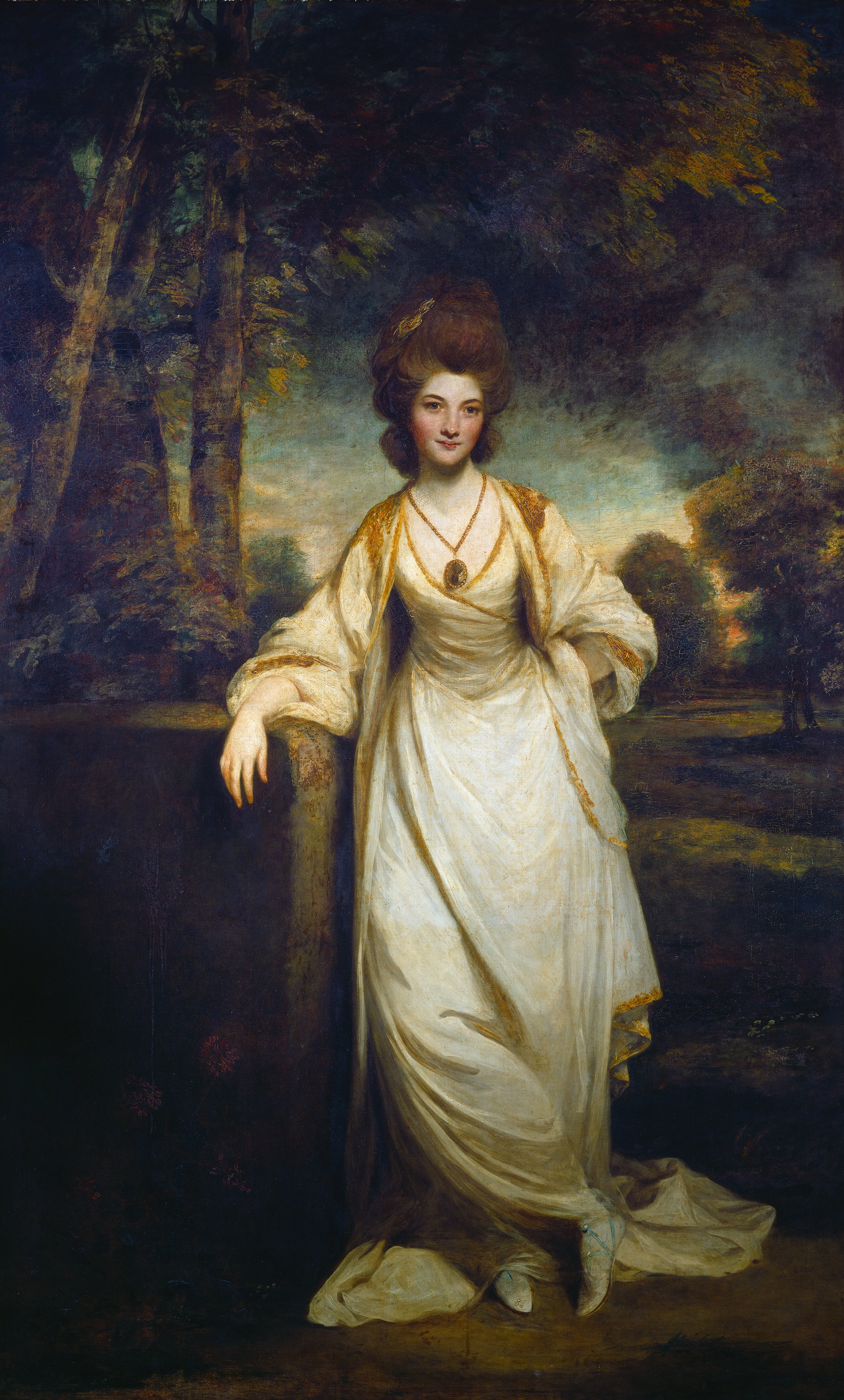
Elizabeth Compton, Countess of Burlington by Sir Joshua Reynolds, 1780-82.

He married Lady Elizabeth Compton, only child of Charles Compton, 7th Earl of Northampton, on 27 February 1782 in London. They had at least 11 children, of whom six children survived to adulthood, although his two eldest sons predeceased him:

- William Cavendish (10 January 1783 – 17 January 1812)
- George Cavendish (14 October 1784 – 22 January 1809)
- Elizabeth Dorothy Cavendish (12 June 1786 – 17 September 1786)
- Lady Anne Cavendish (11 November 1787 – 17 May 1871), married Lord Charles FitzRoy, second son of George FitzRoy, 4th Duke of Grafton
- Gen. The Hon. Henry Cavendish (5 November 1789 – 5 April 1873), married Sarah Fawkener, Frances Susan Lambton and Susanna Emma Byerlie
- Elizabeth Cavendish (13 March 1792 – 26 May 1794)
- Charles Cavendish, 1st Baron Chesham (28 August 1793 – 10 November 1863), married Lady Catherine Gordon, daughter of George Gordon, 9th Marquess of Huntly
- Mary Cavendish (6 March 1795 – 7 June 1795)
- Lady Caroline Cavendish (5 April 1797 – 9 January 1867)
- Frederick Cavendish (28 October 1801 – 27 January 1802)
- Charlotte Cavendish (23 April 1803 – 1 July 1803)

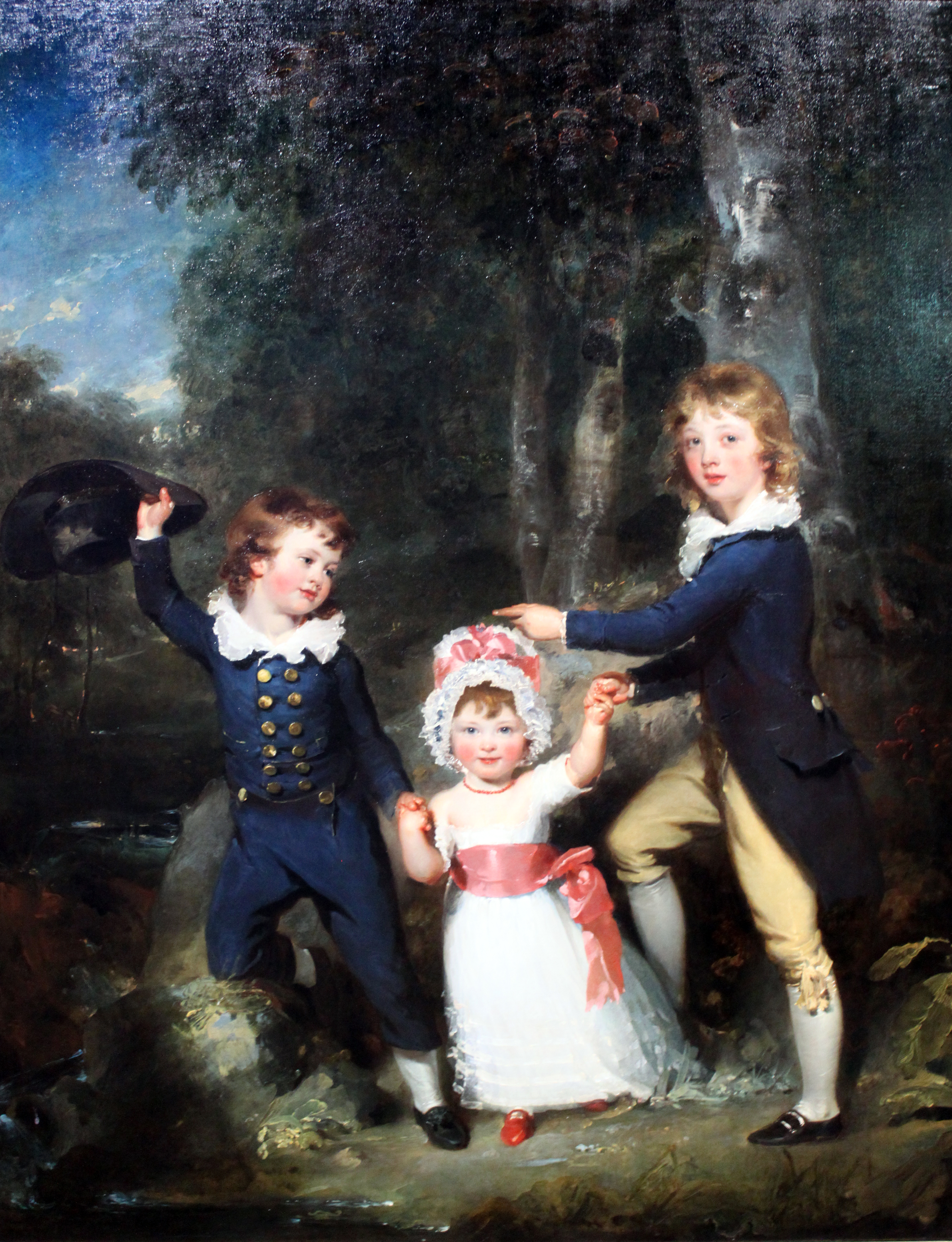
Portrait of the Children of Lord George Cavendish, 1790, by Sir Thomas Lawrence

The Earl was succeeded in his earldom by William, the son of his own eldest son William, who had been killed in a carriage accident in 1812.

== See also ==
- Earl of Burlington
- Duke of Devonshire
- Baron Clifford

Parliament of Great Britain
Preceded by Sir Anthony Thomas Abdy, Bt; Hon Robert Walsingham	Member of Parliament for Knaresborough; 1775–1780; With: Hon Robert Walsingham	Succeeded by Hon Robert Walsingham; Viscount Duncannon
Preceded by Lord Frederick Cavendish; Daniel Parker Coke	Member of Parliament for Derby; 1780–1797; With: Edward Coke	Succeeded by Edward Coke; George Walpole
Preceded by Edward Miller Mundy; Lord John Cavendish	Member of Parliament for Derbyshire; 1797–1800; With: Edward Miller Mundy	Succeeded by Parliament of the United Kingdom
Parliament of the United Kingdom
Preceded by Parliament of Great Britain	Member of Parliament for Derbyshire; 1801–1831; With: Edward Miller Mundy 1801–22; Francis Mundy 1822–31; Hon. George Venables-Vernon 1831	Succeeded by Hon. George Venables-Vernon
Peerage of the United Kingdom
New creation	Earl of Burlington; 1831–1834	Succeeded by William Cavendish
