= Battle of Farrukhabad =

1804 battle of the Second Anglo-Maratha War

- Part of the Second Anglo-Maratha War
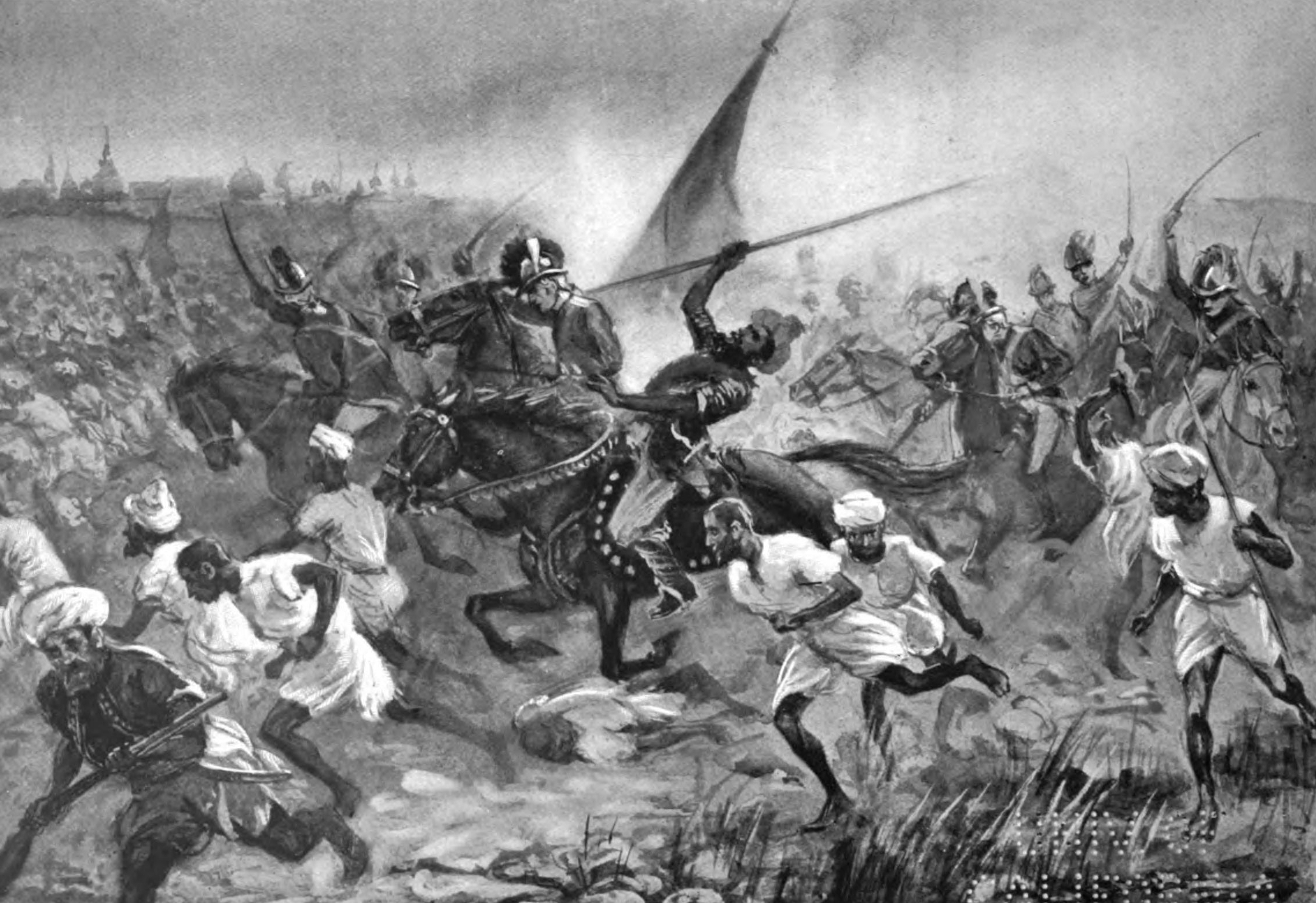
- The 8th Light Dragoons charging Maratha infantry at the battle
Date	16 November 1804
Location	Farrukhabad, Uttar Pradesh, India 27.37°N 79.63°E
Result	British victory

Belligerents
Maratha Empire: Indore State	(United Kingdom of Great Britain and Ireland) British Empire: East India Company

Commanders and leaders
Jaswantaro Holkar	(United Kingdom of Great Britain and Ireland) Gerard Lake

Strength
2,500 men	>550 men

Casualties and losses
12 killed 5 wounded	2 killed 20 wounded
- Location within Uttar Pradesh Farrukhabad (India)

The Battle of Farrukhabad also called the Battle of Fatehgarh was an engagement during the Second Anglo-Maratha War between forces of the East India Company and the forces of Jaswantrao Holkar of the Maratha Empire.

== Background ==
With the British victory at the Siege of Delhi, General Lake continued to pursue the fleeing Marathas in a series of forced marches, leaving Delhi on the 31st of October. The british forces first sighted Maratha cavalry on November 7, but the encounter went by without an engagement. The next day, leaving Colonel Burns in charge of a detachment at Meerut, Lake continued following the Maratha force.

== Battle ==
The battle took place at Farrukhabad in what is now Uttar Pradesh, India. (Note: It is also known as the Battle of Fatehgarh after the town of Fatehgarh which is the administrative headquarters of the district and at that time contained a fort with military significance.) The Company's forces, led by General Gerard Lake, surprised Holkar's forces after making forced marches of more than 60 miles (97 km) in the preceding 24 hours.

Holkar had ordered his force to camp through the night, and when he received news of his defeat at the Battle of Deeg, he retired to rest without informing his officers.

In the early hours of November 16, the Maratha force awoke to find themselves under bombardment from Lake's Horse Artillery. Following the cannonade, the dragoons led by the 8th Royal Irish charged into the maratha camp. Holkar himself narrowly avoided capture, fleeing from the field when the battle started.
