= Robert Bent =

19th-century English politician

Robert Bent (c. 1745 – 1832), of 46 Portugal Street, Lincoln's Inn Fields, Middlesex and West Molesey, Surrey, was an English politician.

He was a member of parliament for Aylesbury 1802 to 29 February 1804. He was unseated for petition on the grounds of bribery.

Bent and his wife had two sons- Jeffery Hart Bent and Ellis Bent, both judges- and three daughters.
