= Darnell's Case =

1627 English habeas corpus case

The Five Knights' case (1627) 3 How St Tr 1 (also Darnel's or Darnell's case) (K.B. 1627), is an English habeas corpus case of major significance in the history of English and later United Kingdom constitutional law.

The case was brought in 1627 by five knights who were being held in detention by King Charles I. Charles had imposed forced loans, and when the knights argued that such loans were illegal and refused to pay, they were imprisoned without trial. The prisoners sought habeas corpus and an order from a common law court that the king should specify what law they were alleged to have broken. The king refused, simply stating that they were being held per speciale mandatum domino regis (by special command of the lord the king). The court declined to release the prisoners, holding that under the common law the king was not required to be more specific.

Parliament rapidly passed legislation to overturn the result, in the Petition of Right 1628, marking the first of a series of legislative changes and court cases that ultimately led to the modern constitutional understanding of habeas corpus as a protected guarantee of fundamental liberty, in the Habeas Corpus Act 1679.

== Background ==
In 1626, Charles I had recalled Parliament to approve taxes for the Anglo-Spanish War (1625–1630). While supportive of the conflict, Parliament first demanded an investigation into the conduct of the army commander, the Duke of Buckingham, notorious for inefficiency and extravagance. Charles refused to allow this and instead adopted a policy of "forced loans", or Benevolence (tax); those who refused to pay would be imprisoned without trial, and if they continued to resist, sent before the Privy Council.

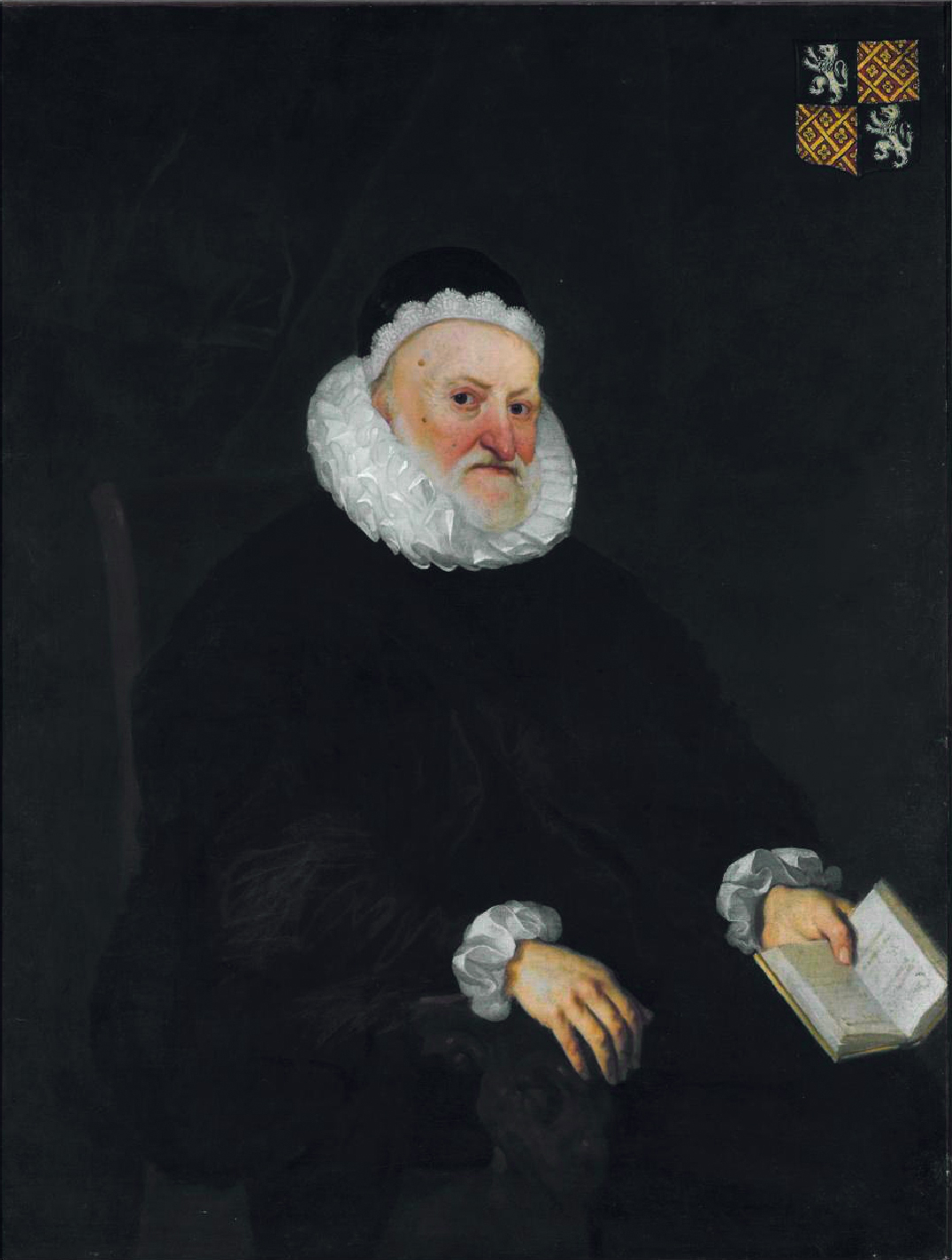
Sir Randolph Crewe, the Chief Justice of the King's Bench, who was dismissed by Charles I for refusing to declare the "forced loans" legal

The Lord Chief Justice of England and Wales Sir Randolph Crewe ruled this policy was illegal and the judiciary complied only after he was dismissed. There were over 76 men who refused to pay the tax as they claimed that it was unauthorized by Parliament. Among them were Sir Thomas Darnell, Sir John Corbet, Sir Walter Erle, Sir John Heveningham and Sir Edmund Hampden, who submitted a joint petition for habeas corpus. Approved on 3 November 1627, the court ordered the five be brought before them in order to clarify what law they had broken; it became known as Darnell's Case, although Darnell himself withdrew.

== Judgment ==
The case was heard by Sir Nicholas Hyde, the new Lord Chief Justice, with the prosecution led by Attorney General Sir Robert Heath. The problem before the court was the defendants had been arrested but the warrants did not specify why; this was unsurprising, since Coke had previously ruled the loans themselves were illegal.

Heath claimed the Royal Prerogative allowed the king to take whatever action he considered necessary "in time of crisis" and thus he had no need to justify the detentions. For the defence, John Selden, a distinguished legal scholar, argued that "by the constant and settled laws of this kingdom, without which we have nothing, no man can be justly imprisoned ...[even by the king]... without a cause of the commitment expressed in the return", and that to hold otherwise would be to treat the free man as having no greater legal status than the villein.

Although the judges were unable to determine what law had been broken, they upheld the right of the king to detain per speciale mandatum domino regis (by special command of the lord the king) and denied bail on the basis that, as there were no charges, "the [prisoners] could not be freed, as the offence was probably too dangerous for public discussion".

== Significance ==
Although the judges had refused to release the prisoners, Charles decided not to pursue charges; since his opponents included the previous Chief Justice, and other senior legal officers, the ruling meant the loans would almost certainly be deemed illegal. Selden claimed afterwards there was an effort made by Charles and Robert Heath to tamper with the rulings of the case, pointing to the fact that both Heath and Hyde were subsequently knighted. While historians have generally agreed with Selden's assertions, Mark Kishlansky has disputed them.

Charles's need for income, with so many openly refusing to pay, forced him to recall Parliament in 1628. The controversy surrounding the case resulted in a majority of the newly-elected MPs being opposed to the king, and parliament rapidly approved the Petition of Right 1628 which reversed the effect of the decision by preventing the power of arbitrary committal by the king. The Habeas Corpus Act 1640 restored the right to petition the courts for release against the wishes of the king and his Council, but it was not completely effective and the practice of executive detention without specific cause continued, notably with Lilburne's Case in 1653. The modern constitutional understanding of habeas corpus as a protected guarantee of fundamental liberty was eventually accomplished by the reforms of the Habeas Corpus Act of 1679.

== Sources ==
- Burgess, Glenn (1992). The Politics of the Ancient Constitution. Macmillan. ISBN 978-0333527467.
- Cust, Richard (1985). "Charles I, the Privy Council, and the Forced Loan". Journal of British Studies. 24 (2): 208–235. doi:10.1086/385832. JSTOR 175703. S2CID 143537267.
- Cust, Richard, “Forced Loan and English Politics, 1626–1628” (Oxford, 1987)
- Christianson, Paul (2004). "Selden, John (1584–1654)". Oxford Dictionary of National Biography (online ed.). Oxford University Press. doi:10.1093/ref:odnb/25052. (Subscription, Wikipedia Library access or UK public library membership required.)
- Guy, J.A. (1982). "The Origin of the Petition of Right Reconsidered". The Historical Journal. 25 (2): 289–312. doi:10.1017/S0018246X82000017. ISSN 0018-246X. S2CID 159977078.
- Hostettler, John (1997). Sir Edward Coke: A Force for Freedom. Barry Rose Law Publishers. ISBN 1-872328-67-9.
- Kishlansky, Mark (1999). "Tyranny Denied: Charles I, Attorney General Heath and the Five Knights' Case". The Historical Journal. 42 (1): 53–83. doi:10.1017/S0018246X98008279. ISSN 0018-246X. S2CID 159628863.
- Gardiner, Samuel Rawson, ed. (1906). "8: The case of the Five Knights, before the King's Bench". The Constitutional Documents of the Puritan Revolution 1625-1660 (Third revised ed.). Oxford University Press. pp. 57–64.
