= Personal Rule =

1629 to 1640 government of Charles I

The Personal Rule (also known as the Eleven Years' Tyranny) was a period in the history of England from the dissolution of the third Parliament of Charles I in 1629 to the summoning of the Short Parliament in 1640, during which Charles declined to call the next parliament and ruled as an autocratic absolute monarch without recourse to Parliament. Charles claimed that he was entitled to do this under the royal prerogative and divine right of kings.

Charles had called three Parliaments by the third year of his reign in 1628. After the murder of George Villiers, Duke of Buckingham, who was deemed to have a negative influence on Charles' foreign policy, Parliament began to criticize the king more harshly than before. Charles then realised that as long as he avoided war he could rule without the need of Parliament.

The Personal Rule came to an end in 1640 when Charles called a parliament to obtain funds for an ongoing war with Scotland.

== Names ==
Whig historians such as S. R. Gardiner called this period the "Eleven Years' Tyranny", because they interpret Charles's actions as highly authoritarian and a contributing factor to the instability that eventually led to the English Civil War. More recent historians such as Kevin Sharpe called the period "Personal Rule", because they consider it to be a more neutral term, and some such as Sharpe have argued that there were some positive aspects of the period.

== Background ==
In the medieval period, government in England was very much centred on the king. He ruled personally, usually assisted by his council, the curia regis. The council members were chosen by the king, and its membership varied greatly, but members often included powerful nobility and churchmen, senior civil servants, and sometimes certain members of the king's friends and family.

Early parliaments began to emerge under Edward I, who wished to implement taxation changes and wide-ranging law reforms, and sought to gain the consent of the nobility. Nevertheless, calling a parliament was an expensive and time-consuming process, requiring many personal invitations (for the House of Lords) and elections in the shires and chartered cities and boroughs. So parliaments would only be summoned on particularly important occasions. Once a parliament had finished its business, the king would dissolve it, and perhaps not summon another for an extended period; in the meantime, the curia regis – that is, the king with his chosen advisers – would make laws ("ordinances"), spend money, and carry on the business of government.

From the 14th to the 16th centuries, the acknowledged powers of Parliament grew. In particular, it was established that Parliament was the only body that could authorise nationwide taxation and excise. Parliament did not obtain these powers as a result of any particular and/or explicit legal and/or constitutional sanction from the Crown, but rather due to a more or less mutual recognition that those who elected Parliaments (the landed gentry) possessed the practical leverage with which they could enforce Parliament's claim to these powers. Simply put, the landed gentry was the only stratum of society in a position to collect and remit taxes for the monarch on a large scale. If a sovereign were to attempt to impose new taxes without consulting the gentry, then the gentry could have simply refused to collect the taxes, and the monarch would have had little feasible recourse.

Once summoned, a parliament could take the opportunity to submit policy proposals to the monarch ("bills"), which would be expected to take precedence over ordinances if signed into law by the monarch, although the monarch was under no obligation to grant royal assent to any such proposal. However, monarchs did increasingly use parliaments more widely in lawmaking as a way of gaining popular support for their policies. One example was during the English Reformation, when the Reformation Parliament acting at Henry VIII's instigation passed a succession of laws regulating the church in England.

The first of the Stuart monarchs to rule England, James I, was perennially short of money and he was obliged to summon parliaments often. Successive parliaments thereupon sought to turn the king's financial woes to their advantage, requiring various policy concessions before voting to approve taxes. In 1625, James was succeeded by his son Charles I, who immediately plunged England into an expensive and ultimately unsuccessful war with Spain, in an attempt to force the Catholic King Philip IV of Spain to intercede with Emperor Ferdinand II on behalf of Charles's brother-in-law Frederick V, Elector Palatine, to regain the Electorate of the Palatinate and his hereditary lands, which Ferdinand had revoked from him.

Parliament's protests about the war's mismanagement by the Duke of Buckingham, and others of Charles' policies, primarily regarding taxation and other methods of acquiring funds, and Charles' refusal to compromise, eventually led to Charles dissolving Parliament in March 1629. He also made peace with Spain and France, largely because the financial burden of waging these wars could not be sustained without funds that Parliament alone could provide. For the next eleven years, Charles governed with only an advisory council of royal appointees.

== The start of Personal Rule ==
There has been considerable historiographical debate about the origins and causes of Personal Rule, with some historians (such as Christopher Hill) favouring a "high road" approach, which emphasises long-term causes such as Stuart financial problems; religious issues (see James VI and I and religious issues and English Reformation); and problems of state development. Other historians favour a "low road" approach, which blames problems immediately caused by Charles, such as the promotion of anti-Calvinist clergy to positions of authority (e.g. Richard Montagu to the role of one of Charles' personal chaplains); reckless spending on the wars in France and Spain; and the corrosive influence of George Villiers, 1st Duke of Buckingham, on relations between monarch and Parliament.

Ultimately, due to a combination of factors, the relationship between Charles and Parliament became unworkable, with both sides entrenched in conflict. Great debate had erupted over Darnell's Case (also known as the Five Knights Case), leading to the passing of the Petition of Right into statute law. This Act of Parliament, despite being given Royal assent by Charles, offended the Royal Prerogative deeply; the monarch was restricted from imprisonment habeas corpus, as well as from imposing taxation without Parliamentary consent.

All of this tension came to a head in early 1629. Sir John Eliot, the leader of the opposition to the King, announced a protestation known as the Three Resolutions. These resolutions denounced perceived Arminianism in the Church of England, as well as calling upon merchants to refuse to pay tonnage and poundage. In response to this, on 10 March 1629, Sir John Finch (the Speaker of the House of Commons) attempted to adjourn the House of Commons on the King's command. However, he was prevented from rising from his seat to give this edict by three MPs – John Eliot, Denzil Holles and Benjamin Valentine – until the Three Resolutions had been passed. No formal vote took place on these resolutions; members shouted their approval instead. The Commons then voted for its own adjournment. Furious, the King announced the dissolution of Parliament on 10 March 1629.

== Finances ==
The greatest problem Charles initially encountered at this stage was a continued lack of funds. The main sources of income for the King were customs duties, feudal dues and income from the King's personal estates. Nationwide taxation was widely understood to be for emergencies and special purposes, such as war, and it was by this time generally accepted that only Parliament could authorise a general tax. But even in peacetime, the traditional sources of the King's revenue were stretched to the limit to fund the business of government. So Charles and his advisers developed various schemes to raise additional revenue without recourse to Parliament.

A large fiscal deficit had arisen in the reigns of Elizabeth I and James I. Notwithstanding Buckingham's short-lived campaigns against both Spain and France, there was little financial capacity for Charles to wage wars overseas. Throughout his reign Charles was obliged to rely primarily on volunteer forces for defence and on diplomatic efforts to support his sister, Elizabeth, and his foreign policy objective for the restoration of the Electoral Palatinate. England was still the least taxed country in Europe, with no official excise and no regular direct taxation. To raise revenue without reconvening Parliament, Charles resurrected an all-but-forgotten law called the "Distraint of Knighthood", in abeyance for over a century, which required any man who earned £40 or more from land each year to present himself at the king's coronation to be knighted. Relying on this old statute, Charles fined individuals who had failed to attend his coronation in 1626. (Note: For comparison, a typical farm labourer could earn 8d a day, or about £10 a year.)

The chief tax imposed by Charles was a feudal levy known as ship money, which proved even more unpopular, and lucrative, than tonnage and poundage before it. Previously, collection of ship money had been authorised only during wars, and only on coastal regions. Charles, however, argued that there was no legal bar to collecting the tax for defence during peacetime and throughout the whole of the kingdom. Ship money, paid directly to the Treasury of the Navy, provided between £150,000 to £200,000 annually between 1634 and 1638, after which yields declined. Opposition to ship money steadily grew, but the 12 common law judges of England declared that the tax was within the king's prerogative, though some of them had reservations. The prosecution of John Hampden for non-payment in 1637–38 provided a platform for popular protest, and the judges only found against Hampden by the narrow margin of 7–5.

The king also derived money through the granting of monopolies, despite a statute forbidding such action, which, though inefficient, raised an estimated £100,000 a year in the late 1630s. (Note: The statute forbade grants of monopolies to individuals but Charles circumvented the restriction by granting monopolies to companies.) Charles also raised funds from the Scottish nobility, at the price of considerable acrimony, by the Act of Revocation (1625), whereby all gifts of royal or church land made to the nobility since 1540 were revoked, with continued ownership being subject to an annual rent. In addition, the boundaries of the royal forests in England were extended to their ancient limits as part of a scheme to maximise income by exploiting the land and fining land users within the re-asserted boundaries for encroachment.

Sales of royal lands, especially the large expanses of under-developed royal forests also contributed to finances. Courtiers were asked to survey the lands, to provide programmes to disafforest these areas. The focus of the programme was disafforestation and sale of forest lands for development as pasture and arable, or in the case of the Forest of Dean, development for the iron industry. This included providing compensation to people using the lands in common, especially manorial lords and their tenants. Others who had settled illegally were not entitled to compensation and frequently rioted. The discontent following a major wave of sales included what was known as the Western Rising, but extended beyond, for instance to riots in Feckenham Forest and Malvern Chase.

The practice of granting extensive monopolies agitated the public, who were forced to pay higher prices by the monopoly holders. Against the background of this unrest, Charles faced bankruptcy in the summer of 1640 as Parliament continued to refuse new taxes. The City of London, preoccupied with its own grievances further refused to make any loans to the king, and likewise he was unable to subscribe any foreign loans. In this extremity, Charles seized the money held in trust at the mint of the Exchequer in the tower of London. The Royal Mint held a monopoly on the exchange of foreign coin and from this the mint operated as a bank containing much capital of the merchants and goldsmiths of the city. In July, Charles seized all £130,000 of this money, and in August he followed it up by seizing all the stocks of pepper held by the East India Company, and selling it at distress prices.

On the other side of the ledger, the government tried to reduce expenditure, especially by avoiding war (thus pursuing an isolationist foreign policy) and also avoiding large-scale innovations on the domestic front. Of equal importance, Charles learned to spend less extravagantly compared to his father.

== Religion during Personal Rule ==
Without the influence of Parliament, the Caroline government was able to exert a much greater force on the Church. During Personal Rule, there was a noticeable shift in the Church of England towards a more sacramental and ceremonialist direction. The appointment of William Laud to the role of Archbishop of Canterbury in 1633 signalled this shift most of all. One of Charles' main concerns was the liturgical and religious unity of his Three Kingdoms. His government tried to squash dissent legalistically, by making use of the Court of High Commission and the Star Chamber. One very prominent example of this was the punishment of three dissenters – William Prynne, Henry Burton and John Bastwick – in 1637; they were pilloried, whipped and mutilated by cropping and then imprisoned indefinitely for their publication and authorship of anti-episcopal pamphlets.

Liturgical shifts were important to Laud's theology. A greater insistence on the usage of the Book of Common Prayer in all services (which was enforced by episcopal visitation); the placement of the altar at the east end of the Church; and kneeling for the reception of the sacrament were all hallmarks of Laudian liturgy. This was all encompassed within a policy called 'the beauty of holiness' (this phrase coming from Psalm 96), which described how Christian worship should be couched in ceremony and splendour to further devotion. Foreshadowing debates that would later emerge over clerical dress, Laud also imposed a rule which decreed all ministers should wear a surplice when performing a service. All of these reforms and changes were often criticised by Puritan and other opponents as a return to popery and the vicious influence of Roman Catholicism returning to a semi-reformed English Church.

Whilst opposition from the Church of Scotland as well as radical Puritans was strong and consistent throughout Personal Rule, there was little opposition from the English population at large. Indeed, the Church was generally accepted as becoming more ceremonial in its style of worship, such as through the installation of Laudian altar rails. It is estimated that as many as three-quarters of England's parish churches had altar rails installed by 1639. However, much of this ceremonial progress was undone by Parliamentary decree upon the calling of the Long Parliament, which ordered the destruction of all altar rails in 1641.

Historians generally agree that the Laudian reforms were divisive, but disagree over the salience of religious issues in the bringing about of the end of Personal Rule. John Morrill argued that 'it is impossible to overestimate the damage done by the Laudians'. Other historians, such as David Smith and Ian Gentles, also argue the primacy of religious issues in the downfall of Personal Rule and in the start of the Civil War in general. However, historians such as John Adamson stress the importance of constitutional, short-term issues such as the trial and execution of Thomas Wentworth, 1st Earl of Strafford, as the most important context for the outbreak of Civil War. There can be little denial of the importance of religion in the contentions within Personal Rule. Attempts to instil religious conformity, especially in Scotland, generated opposition and drove the calling of first the Short Parliament and then the Long Parliament. The Bishops' Wars were a direct consequence of the attempt to impose the English Book of Common Prayer on the Scottish Kirk; Charles' defeat here signalled the necessity to end Personal Rule before such a war could break out in England (as it would in 1642).

== End ==
The Personal Rule began to unravel in 1637, when Charles, along with his advisor Archbishop Laud, attempted to reform the then-episcopal Church of Scotland to bring it into line, especially in its liturgy, with the Church of England. This met with widespread political opposition in Scotland and, by June 1639, Scottish and English armies faced off on the border. Though this was resolved by a truce, relations soon broke down again and Charles resolved to regain his authority in Scotland by force. To pay English troops to fight the Scots, he was advised to call a new parliament. This ended the Personal Rule, but the new body which assembled was unwilling to raise the taxes needed to finance war with Scotland and Charles dissolved it after only a few weeks. In the months which followed, the Scots invaded, defeated the English army and occupied parts of Northern England. With no other routes left to him, the king summoned what became known as the Long Parliament. After reaching a settlement with the Scots, the new parliamentary leaders turned their attention to domestic matters and demanded from Charles ever more sweeping concessions over government policy. In January 1642, Charles left London to raise an army and regain control by force initiating the English Civil War.
