= Billet =

Living-quarters for soldiers

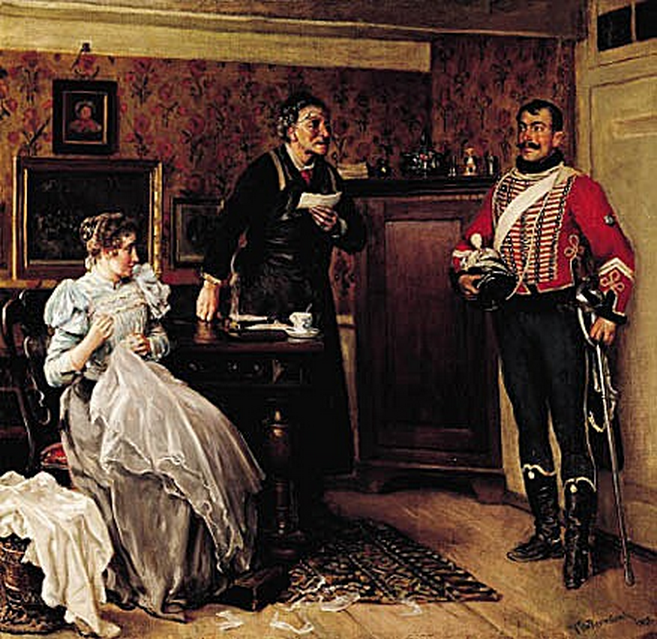
A billet scene, painting from 1898 by Vilhelm Rosenstand

In European militaries, a billet is a living-quarters to which a soldier is assigned to sleep. In American usage, it refers to a specific personnel position, assignment, or duty station to which a soldier can be assigned. Historically, a billet was a private dwelling that was required to accept a soldier.

Soldiers are generally billeted in barracks or garrisons when not on combat duty, although in some armies soldiers with families are permitted to maintain a home off-post. Used for a building, the term billet is more commonly used in British English; United States standard terms are quarters, barracks, Single (Soldier) Housing or Family Housing.

== British history ==
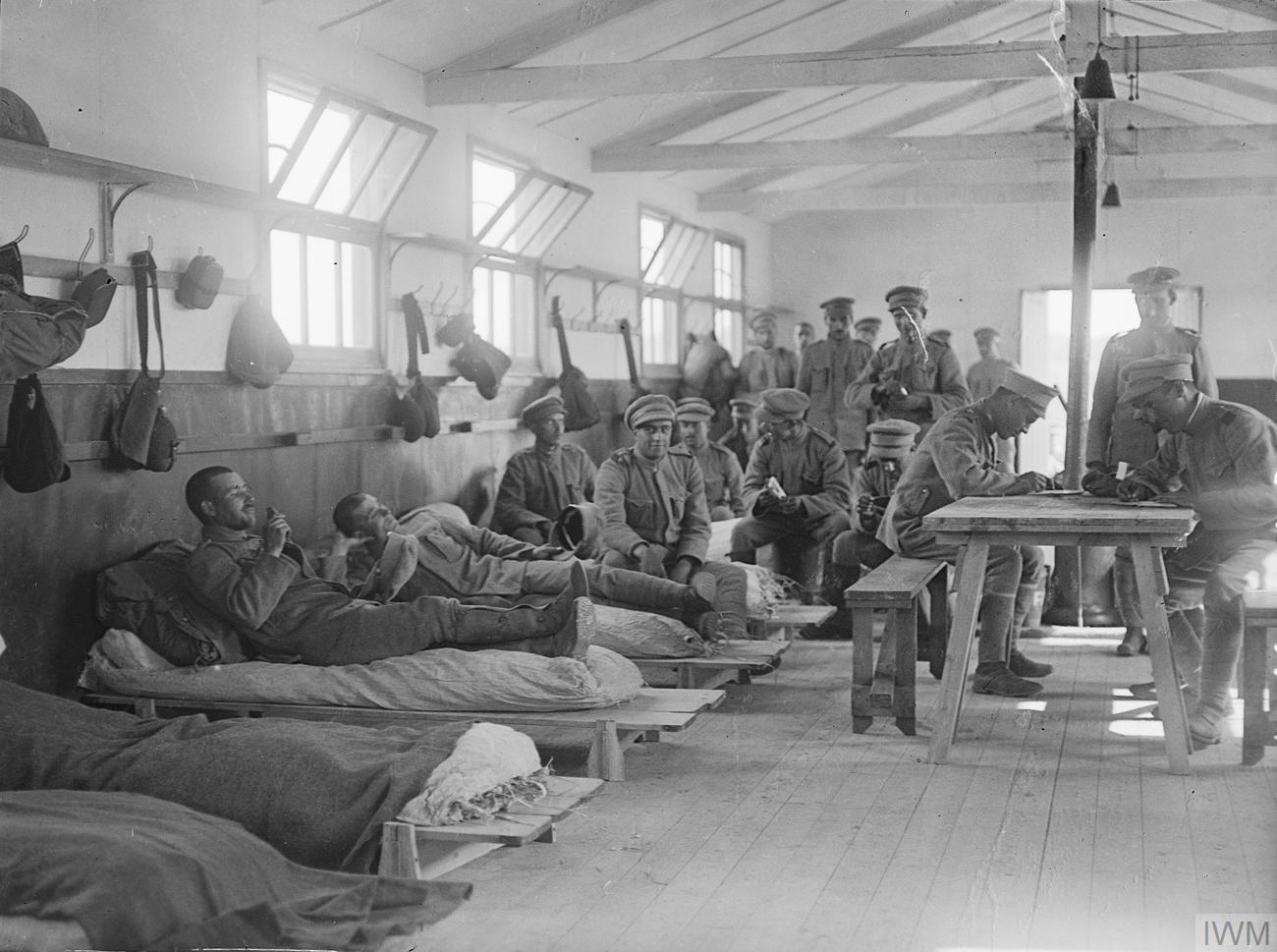
Troops of the Portuguese Expeditionary Corps billeted in Hazeley Down Camp, Winchester, England, September 1917

Originally, a billet (from French billet) was a note, commonly used in the 18th and early 19th centuries as a "billet of invitation". In this sense, the term was used to denote an order issued to a soldier entitling him to quarters with a certain person. From this meaning, the word billet came to be loosely used of the quarters thus obtained. The division of troops to organize their billeting was known as cantoning. Repeated petitions against the practice of billeting, starting in the 16th century, culminated in its outlawing in 1689 as an extension of a section of the Petition of Right 1628.

During wartime, civilians who have been evacuated from a city in danger of attack are billetted in communal shelters or in the homes of individuals. The practice of billeting evacuees was widespread in Britain during World War II, particularly during the Blitz when children and other non-essential persons in major cities were sent to rural areas for safety.

In European countries since the formation of regular forces, the Quartermaster was an occupation and a rank of the individuals responsible for the provision of sleeping quarters and other provisions for regular time troops. Train tickets are called 'billet' in many French influenced parts of the world including eastern Europe. Overnight transport by train was very common for soldiers and on the billet, the number indicating the location of the quarters would be specified. Later, during times of over-surging troops, more troops would be assigned to a train than its regular housing capacity. Thus, only those with a billet would be assigned to a room or quarter. Hence, the two became synonymous.

== United States usage ==
One of the major grievances of the American colonists against the British government which led to the American Revolutionary War was the quartering of soldiers in civilian homes. As a result, the Third Amendment to the United States Constitution provides restrictions on the manner in which the federal government of the United States may require civilians to provide housing for American soldiers.

Billet can mean a specific personnel position, assignment, or duty station which may be filled by one person, most commonly used by the United States Navy, the United States Marine Corps, and the United States Coast Guard. Every person reporting aboard a ship or shore installation in the naval services is assigned a billet according to the unit watch, quarter and station bill, which shows the duties, stations and billet assignments for all crew members.

Billet can also refer to the position and weapons of the members of a unit. For example, the billets of a fireteam include a fireteam leader (M16), a rifleman (M16), an automatic rifleman (M249), and a grenadier (M16 with M203 grenade launcher).

== Amateur sports ==
In North America, billet families offer room and board to junior ice hockey players (or under-20 athletes from other sports, such as soccer) who leave home to join elite teams in other towns. Coaches are often involved with matching a player to a billet family. The objective of a billet family is to provide a "home away from home" for young players during the season. However, fears over child safety in amateur sports in Canada drastically curtailed billeting practice. Many places do not billet, while other clubs through their provincial sports' bodies have instituted mandatory criminal record checks for all involved in amateur sports, including coaches, volunteers and anyone over eighteen years of age from the host family.

== Other usage ==
- In Spain, the noble officers of royal tercios were billeted in the homes of the affluent and well-to-do citizens of the towns and cities they were stationed in. This usage is employed as a plot device in the Barber of Seville.
- In Canada, the term is widely used in conjunction with housing visiting performers from theatrical or musical tours, such as for a Fringe Theatre festival or a choir festival. Students traveling for a band or choir tour may billet with members of the host band or choir.
- The expression "billet" is also used for an exchange student.

== Sources ==
- Cutler, Deborah W. and Thomas J. Cutler (2005). Dictionary of Naval Terms. Naval Institute Press, Annapolis, Maryland. ISBN 978-1-59114-150-1.
