= Sir Edmund Hampden =

17th-century English landowner and participant in important legal case

Sir Edmund Hampden (born c. 1575) was an English landowner, at the centre of a celebrated state legal case in the reign of Charles I of England, known as the Five Knights' Case or Darnell's Case.

In 1626 Hampden, along with Sir Thomas Darnell, Sir John Corbet, Sir Walter Erle, and Sir John Heveningham, were among 70 individuals, including his nephew, the politician John Hampden, who were imprisoned without trial for refusing to pay "forced loans", demanded by Charles I to fund the current war against Spain.

Hampden and the other knights submitted a joint petition for habeas corpus to the Court of King's Bench, which agreed and ordered them to be brought before the court to clarify what law they had broken. Hampden's counsel in the case was the noted legal scholar John Selden.

The judges were unable to determine what law had been broken, and avoided the issue by denying bail on the grounds that as there were no charges, "the [prisoners] could not be freed, as the offence was probably too dangerous for public discussion". Despite the judges' refusal to release the prisoners, Charles decided not to pursue charges.

== Family ==
Hampden was one of two or three sons of Griffith Hampden (1543–91) and Anne Cave (d. 1594). His brother William (1570–1597) married Elizabeth Cromwell (1574–1664), the sister of Sir Oliver Cromwell; their children included the politician John Hampden.

Hampden's daughter Elizabeth married Colonel Nathaniel Rich of the Rich family, and their children included Sir Robert Rich.

== Citations ==
- Cust, Richard (1985). "Charles I, the Privy Council, and the Forced Loan". Journal of British Studies. 24 (2): 208–235. doi:10.1086/385832. JSTOR 175703.
- Guy, J.A. (1982). "The Origin of the Petition of Right Reconsidered". The Historical Journal. 25 (2): 289–312. doi:10.1017/S0018246X82000017. ISSN 0018-246X.
- Hostettler, John (1997). Sir Edward Coke: A Force for Freedom. Barry Rose Law Publishers. ISBN 1-872328-67-9.
- Russell, Conrad (2008). "Hampden, John". Oxford Dictionary of National Biography (online ed.). Oxford University Press. doi:10.1093/ref:odnb/12169. (Subscription, Wikipedia Library access or UK public library membership required.)
- Rylands, W. Harry, ed. (1909). The Visitation of the County of Buckingham made in 1634. The Publications of the Harleian Society. Vol. LVIII. Harleian Society. pp. 70–71.
- W.J.J. (1981). "Hampden, Griffith (1543-91), of Great Hampden, Bucks.". In Hasler, P.W. (ed.). The History of Parliament: the House of Commons 1558-1603. Boydell and Brewer.
