= Engblom v. Carey =

Court case interpreting the Third Amendment to the U.S. Constitution

- Court: United States Court of Appeals for the Second Circuit
- Full case name: Engblom and Palmer v. Carey, et al
- Argued: March 1, 1982
- Decided: May 3, 1982
- Citation: 677 F.2d 957

Case history
- Subsequent history: 572 F. Supp. 44 (S.D.N.Y. 1982), 724 F.2d 28 (2d Cir. 1983)

Holding
- Quartering state-controlled National Guard soldiers in apartments during peacetime violates the Third Amendment rights of the tenants.

Court membership
- Judges sitting: Wilfred Feinberg (Chief), Walter R. Mansfield, Irving Kaufman

Case opinions
- Majority: Mansfield, joined by Feinberg
- Dissent: Kaufman

Laws applied
- U.S. Const. amends. III, XIV

Engblom v. Carey, 677 F.2d 957 (2d Cir. 1982), is a landmark decision by the United States Court of Appeals for the Second Circuit interpreting the Third Amendment to the United States Constitution for the first time. It is notable for being one of the few significant court decisions to interpret the Third Amendment prohibition of quartering soldiers in homes during peacetime without the owner's consent. The dispute covered the housing of the National Guard in worker dorms while they were acting as prison workers during a strike.

In a 2–1 decision by a three-judge panel, Engblom articulated three principles that apply to challenges under the Third Amendment. First, national guardsmen are considered soldiers for the purposes of a Third Amendment claim. This holding extends Third Amendment protections beyond federal armed forces, such as the army, to include the state-regulated militia. Second, the Third Amendment is incorporated and thus applies to individual states as well as the federal government. This holding extends Third Amendment protections beyond federal use of the National Guard to include state use of the National Guard. Third, the protections of the Third Amendment apply beyond fee simple homeownership. This holding interprets the Third Amendment as protecting those who have general control over access to a property. The panel determined that the correctional officers were tenants (having such general control) and remanded the case back to the district court. However, the lower court ultimately ruled in the defendants' favor based on qualified immunity.

The Third Amendment remains one of the least cited sections of the Constitution in United States case law, and it has never provided the primary basis for a Supreme Court decision. As a decision of the Second Circuit, Engblom v. Carey is only binding precedent in New York, Vermont, and Connecticut, but its general implications have been considered by legal scholars.

== Legal background ==
No Freeman shall be compelled to receive any Mariners or Soldiers into his house and there suffer them to Sojourner, against their wills provided. Always it be not in time of Actual War within this province.

— New York Charter of Liberties and Privileges (1683)

The Third Amendment to the United States Constitution prohibits the quartering of soldiers in homes. While the relevance of the Third Amendment in modern times is limited, at the time the Constitution was ratified, quartering of soldiers was a major issue. In the colonial period, whenever Britain would launch a military operation in North America, their soldiers needed to be housed. This burden fell to the American colonies, and often soldiers would be quartered in private homes. This caused tension as early as 1676, and in 1683 the New York Assembly's Charter of Liberties and Privileges responded by prohibiting the quartering of soldiers in private homes during peacetime. The problem continued during the French and Indian War, and after its conclusion, the British parliament passed the Quartering Acts which shifted onto the colonies the burden of quartering a standing army in peacetime. Ultimately, the quartering of troops proved too onerous, and in the Declaration of Independence, the revolutionaries cited the quartering of troops as a reason for independence. By the end of the Revolutionary War, three states had passed declarations of rights that prohibited the quartering of troops like New York's 1683 resolution.

During the ratification of the Constitution, the lack of a bill of rights—including the right to be free from quartering soldiers—was a point of contention between federalists and anti-federalists. Federalists favored the quartering prohibitions in state constitutions, while anti-federalists proposed a stronger, nation-wide prohibition. From this debate, three versions of the third amendment were proposed. The first—proposed by the Maryland and New Hampshire delegations—prohibited quartering in homes during times of peace. The Virginia delegation proposed a second version which included language which clarified the right in times of war: soldiers would only be quartered "as the law directs". This posed an interpretive issue, as peace and war may not cover times of unrest when the military is active but no declaration of war has been made. The version proposed by James Madison forbade forced quartering during times of peace but addressed the interpretive issues of the Virginia amendment by forbidding quartering in homes when not at peace, except as provided by law. However Madison's proposal was rejected, and with minor alterations, Virginia's proposal was ratified as the text of the Third Amendment:

No Soldier shall, in time of peace be quartered in any house, without the consent of the Owner, nor in time of war, but in a manner to be prescribed by law.

Since its ratification, the Third Amendment has rarely been litigated, and no Supreme Court case has relied on the Third Amendment as the basis for a decision. As such, the Third Amendment has not been found to apply to the state—a principle known as the incorporation doctrine. Before the 1920s, the Bill of Rights was considered to only apply to the federal government, not actions by state governments. However, in the 1920s, the federal judiciary began to interpret the Fourteenth Amendment as preventing individual states from violating federally protected rights. Under the incorporation doctrine, Supreme Court cases found that individual amendments applied to the states. The few times the Supreme Court has cited the Third Amendment in decisions, it was in consideration of general constitutional principles—particularly privacy rights. Chief among them is the decision in Griswold v. Connecticut (1965) which articulated a constitutionally protected right to privacy. Griswold found this right in multiple amendments, but included the Third Amendment among its examples of rights which imply overarching privacy right. However the Supreme Court has not taken up the question of whether the Third Amendment is incorporated. Because the National Guard is a state-run militia, if the Third Amendment were not incorporated, then its protections would not apply to quartering of state-controlled National Guard troops.

== Prior history ==
=== Original dispute ===
Following the September 1971 Attica prison uprising, New York State instituted several reforms to address due process rights of prisoners, increase racial integration of prison staff, and improve training and address racism among corrections officers. As a result of these reforms, discontent grew among New York State corrections officers who felt their status and authority diminished. In December 1978, the union representing the officers began negotiating a new contract with the state. Having recently negotiated a seven-percent wage increase with the civil servant union, the state offered a seven-percent wage increase to the officers. The state also sought to reduce the seniority rights of officers (Note: Officers with longer tenure had a preference for less hazardous assignments, but the state wanted greater flexibility in assigning female guards and positions in frequent contact with prisoners.) and change the structure of the officers' workers' compensation leave. To counter the loss of status and authority, the union rejected the changes in seniority and leave policy and pushed for an increase of more than seven percent. After four months of negotiation, the union and state declared an impasse in March 1979. After mediation with the Public Employees Relation Board, the state offered a contract with a seven-percent pay increase and a clause to reopen the negotiation of these points in the second year. The union negotiating team accepted these terms, but it was not ratified by the union membership. On April 18, 1979, nearly all of the 7,000 officers of the New York State Department of Corrections went on strike.

Plaintiff-appellants Marianne Engblom and Charles Palmer were corrections officers at Mid-Orange Correctional Facility in Warwick, New York. Engblom and Palmer lived in the Upper Staff Building—a residence for staff located about a quarter-mile (0.40 km) from the prison. The tenancy was regulated by the Department of Corrections, and tenants were required to pay non-tax-deductible rent, provide their own furnishings, and were entitled to repairs and maintenance "following normal 'landlord-tenant responsibilities and practices". During the strike, New York Governor Hugh Carey activated the National Guard to maintain the prisons. The Guard arrived at Mid-Orange on April 19, 1979, and reached a total force of 260. These Guardsmen were housed in the school and administrative buildings before April 25, at which point the striking officer-tenants were evicted and Guardsmen stationed in those rooms. Both Engblom and Palmer were evicted in this manner. (Note: Plaintiffs and defendants agree that Palmer both participated in the strike and had his room quarter National Guardsmen. Engblom testifies that she did not participate in the strike and that her room was occupied by Guardsmen, but the defendants dispute both points.)

The strike ended May 5, 1979. Engblom and Palmer subsequently filed suit in the United States District Court for the Southern District of New York against the state of New York and its governor, Hugh Carey. Petitioners asserted violation of the Due Process Clause of the Fourteenth Amendment, and violation of the Third Amendment.

=== District Court ===
The District Court ruled in favor of the defendants and dismissed the suit. Petitioners then appealed to the Court of Appeals for the Second Circuit.

== Decision ==
Rendered on May 3, 1982, the decision was written for the court by Judge Walter R. Mansfield. It began by affirming the District Court's dismissal of the Due Process claim. It then turned to petitioners' Third Amendment claim.

Because of the lack of any prior Third Amendment jurisprudence, this decision established three important holdings not previously articulated: (1) that the National Guardsmen qualify as soldiers under the Third Amendment; (2) that the Third Amendment applies to state as well as federal authorities, i.e., is incorporated against the states; and (3), that the protection of the Third Amendment extends beyond homeowners, that is, those only with a fee simple arrangement, but includes anyone who, within their residence, has a legal expectation of privacy and a legal right to exclude others from entering into the premises. The majority held that the correctional officers' occupancy in the rooms was covered under the legal rules of "tenancy" and was therefore protected under the Third Amendment.

The case was remanded to District Court where it was decided in the defendants' favor, due to the principle that, as agents of the state, the defendants were covered by a qualified immunity unless they knowingly acted illegally. In the absence of any previous precedent on this issue, the standard of knowing illegality was not met.

Concurring in part and dissenting in part, Judge Irving R. Kaufman maintained that the officers' occupancy was covered under the lesser protection of employee housing and that the special circumstances of residency in prison grounds superseded Third Amendment protection. Kaufman deemed the application of the Third Amendment to be "far-fetched".

== Footnotes ==
=== Bibliography ===
- Bell, Tom W. (1993). "The Third Amendment: Forgotten but Not Gone". William and Mary Bill of Rights. 2: 117–150. Archived from the original on April 30, 2023.
- Congressional Research Service (2012). "Third Amendment: In General". Constitution Annotated. Archived from the original on May 21, 2021.
- Constitutional Rights Foundation (n.d.). "BRIA 7 4 b The 14th Amendment and the "Second Bill of Rights"". Archived from the original on December 4, 2022.
- Friedland, Stephen I. (2014). "The Third Amendment, Privacy and Mass Surveillance". Wake Forest Law Review. Archived from the original on June 18, 2022.
- Gamble, John (2015). "The third artefact: beyond fear of standing armies and military occupation, does the Third Amendment have relevance in modern American law?" (PDF). Alabama Civil Rights & Civil Liberties Law Review. 6: 205. Archived from the original (PDF) on March 8, 2021.
- Horowitz, Morton (1991). "Is the Third Amendment Obsolete". Valparaiso University Law Review. 26: 209. Archived from the original on December 9, 2022.
- Monk, Linda R. (2018). The Bill of Rights: A User's Guide. Hachette Books. ISBN 978-0-316-41775-4.
- Smith, Rich (2010). Second and Third Amendments: The Right to Security. ABDO Publishing Company. ISBN 978-1-61784-254-2.
- Wexler, Jay (2011). The Odd Clauses: Understanding the Constitution Through Ten of Its Most Curious Provisions. Beacon Press. ISBN 978-0-8070-0091-5.
- Vile, John R. (2011). A Companion to the United States Constitution and Its Amendments. Rowman & Littlefield. ISBN 978-1-4422-0990-9.
- Zimmer, Lynn; Jacobs, James (1981). "Challenging the Taylor Law: Prison Guards on Strike". ILR Review. 34 (4): 531–544. doi:10.2307/2522476. JSTOR 2522476.

=== Case citations ===
- Engblom v. Carey, 677 F.2d 957 (2nd Circuit 1982).
- Griswold v. Connecticut, 381 U.S. 484 (Supreme Court 1965).
