= Quartering Acts =

18th-century British acts of Parliament (1760s–70s)

The Quartering Acts were several acts of the Parliament of Great Britain which required local authorities in the Thirteen Colonies of British North America to provide British Army personnel in the colonies with housing and food. Each of the Quartering Acts was an amendment to the Mutiny Act and required annual renewal by Parliament. They were originally intended as a response to issues which arose during the French and Indian War and soon became a source of tensions between the inhabitants of the colonies and the government in London. These tensions would later lead toward the American War of Independence. These acts were the reason for the Third Amendment to the United States Constitution.

== Quartering Act 1765 ==
Mutiny, America Act 1765
- Act of Parliament
- Parliament of Great Britain
- Long title: An act to amend and render more effectual, in his Majesty's dominions in America, an act passed in this present session of parliament, intituled, An act for punishing mutiny and desertion, and for the better payment of the army and their quarters.
- Citation: 5 Geo. 3. c. 33
- Territorial extent: Great Britain; British North American Colonies

Dates
- Royal assent: 15 May 1765
- Commencement: 25 March 1765 (Note: Section 30.)
- Expired: 24 March 1767
- Repealed: 15 July 1867
Other legislation
Amends	Mutiny Act 1765
Repealed by	Statute Law Revision Act 1867
Relates to	Mutiny in America Act 1766; Mutiny in America Act 1767; Rebellion in America Act 1767; Mutiny in America Act 1769; Mutiny in America Act 1774

Status: Repealed

Text of statute as originally enacted

General Thomas Gage, the Commander-in-Chief, North America, and other British officers who had fought in the French and Indian War (including Major James Robertson), had found it hard to persuade colonial assemblies to pay for quartering and provisioning of regular troops on the march. Therefore, he asked Parliament to do something. Most colonies had supplied provisions during the war, but the issue was disputed in peacetime. The Province of New York was their headquarters, because the assembly had passed an Act to provide for the quartering of British regulars, but it expired on 2 January 1764, The result was the Quartering Act 1765, which went far beyond what Gage had requested. No standing army had been kept in the colonies before the French and Indian War, so the colonies asked why a standing army was needed after the French had been defeated in battle.

This first Quartering Act was given royal assent on 15 May 1765, and provided that colonial authorities would arrange for British troops to be housed in local barracks and public houses, as by the Mutiny Act 1765, but if the soldiers outnumbered the housing available, would quarter them in "inns, livery stables, ale houses, victualing houses, and the houses of sellers of wine and houses of persons selling of rum, brandy, strong water, cider or metheglin", and if numbers required in "uninhabited houses, outhouses, barns, or other buildings." Colonial authorities were required to pay the cost of housing and feeding these soldiers.

When 1,500 British troops arrived at New York City in 1766 the New York Provincial Assembly refused to comply with the Quartering Act and did not supply billeting for the troops. The troops had to remain on their ships. With its great impact on the city, a skirmish occurred in which one colonist was wounded following the Assembly's refusal to provide quartering. For failure to comply with the Quartering Act, Parliament suspended the Province of New York's governor and legislature in 1767 and 1769, but never carried it out, since the Assembly soon agreed to contribute money toward the quartering of troops; the New York Assembly allocated funds for the quartering of British troops in 1771.

The Quartering Act was circumvented in all colonies other than Pennsylvania.

This act expired on 24 March 1767.

== Quartering Act 1774 ==
Mutiny in America Act 1774
- Act of Parliament
- Parliament of Great Britain
- Long title: An Act for further continuing Two Acts, made in the Sixth and Ninth Years of His Majesty's Reign, for punishing Mutiny and Desertion; and for the better Payment of the Army and their Quarters, in His Majesty's Dominions in America.
- Citation: 14 Geo. 3. c. 6
- Territorial extent: Great Britain; British North American Colonies

Dates
- Royal assent: 9 March 1774
- Commencement: 13 January 1774 (Note: Start of session.)
- Expired: 24 March 1776 (Note: Section 3.)
- Repealed: 21 August 1871
Other legislation
Amends	Mutiny in America Act 1766; Mutiny in America Act 1769
Repealed by	Statute Law Revision Act 1871
Relates to	Mutiny, America Act 1765; Mutiny in America Act 1767

Status: Repealed

Text of statute as originally enacted

The Quartering Act 1774 was known as one of the Coercive Acts in Great Britain, and as part of the Intolerable Acts in the colonies. The Quartering Act applied to all of the colonies, and sought to create a more effective method of housing British troops in America. In a previous act, the colonies had been required to provide housing for soldiers, but colonial legislatures had been uncooperative in doing so. The new Quartering Act allowed a governor to house soldiers in other buildings if suitable quarters were not provided. While many sources claim that the Quartering Act allowed troops to be billeted in occupied private homes, historian David Ammerman's 1974 study claimed that this is a myth, and that the act only permitted troops to be quartered in unoccupied buildings.

... it shall and may be lawful for the governor of the province to order and direct such and so many uninhabited houses, out-houses, barns, or other buildings, as he shall think necessary to be taken ...

— Quartering Act 1774

The act expired on 24 March 1776.

== Quartering in time of war ==
During the French and Indian War, British officers frequently requisitioned private dwellings throughout the Thirteen Colonies in order to quarter their troops. Opinion in the colonies mostly opposed this due to the fact that the Mutiny Acts passed in 1723, 1754 and 1756 by the British Parliament prohibited the stationing of regular troops in private residences, something which was largely ignored by officers stationed in North America. The decision by British officers to ignore this aspect of the Mutiny Acts was viewed by some in the colonies (many of whom published their arguments in writing) to contravene the principle that the armed forces should always be subordinate to civil authority.

As a result of mounting concerns over the stationing of troops in private dwellings, the Pennsylvania Provincial Assembly met and debated over proposed quartering bills that guaranteed any citizen the right to choose whether or not to allow soldiers to be quartered in any residence belonging to them. The Assembly rejected several proposed bills related to the issue before passing one which ignored it altogether and only focused on how soldiers were to be quartered in public establishments. In December of 1756, commander in chief Lord Loudoun ordered Colonel Henry Bouquet to take whatever quarters he needed from the colonists by force. Bouquet wrote a letter to the governor of Pennsylvania telling him to issue a warrant to allow the quartering of his troops in private homes.

The governor issued the warrant, but left it blank instead of directly listing what Bouquet could or could not do. The Pennsylvania Provincial Assembly was outraged when they learned what their governor had done. Instead of asking for a veto on the warrant, they asked for a review on how many troops could be quartered in a single home at a time. The only response they received, however, was that the king's troops must and will be quartered. In response to this the Assembly met on a Sunday for the first time. There they wrote a letter to the governor asking why he was violating the Mutiny Acts when the acts had been passed by the British Parliament.

In response to what was happening to the colonists, Benjamin Franklin opened up an Assembly meeting suggesting that soldiers could be quartered in public houses in the suburbs. This meant that, instead of the troops being directly in the city, they would be in houses on the city's outskirts or on farms where they could potentially have more space. Governor Denny attended this Pennsylvania meeting and bluntly answered that Lord Loudoun had requested quartering for the troops in Philadelphia and if anybody had a problem with this then they should talk to him. The committeemen responding by stating publicly that they felt Denny was siding with Lord Loudoun when in their view, since he was the governor, he should have worked to protect their rights instead. In Albany, New York, the mayor had allocated 1,000 pounds for the building of barracks for Loudoun's troops, but the barracks had not yet been built by the time the soldiers arrived. The mayor told Loudoun that he knew his rights and refused to let the troops be quartered in Albany. When the mayor stayed adamant on his beliefs of not allowing the soldiers to be quartered, Loudoun had them quarter themselves in private homes.

In an early August committee meeting in Boston, Massachusetts, the governor was able to get the committee to pass a bill to grant money for the building of barracks. These barracks would accommodate up to one thousand troops. The barracks were built and all that had to be done was convince Loudoun to obey the procedures set by Parliament. Everything went smoothly until two recruiting officers complained to governor Pownall of Massachusetts that they were denied quarters in Boston. The response was that it was illegal to quarter in private homes in Boston and the committeemen suggested that they stay at the newly built barracks at Castle William. The timing of this new meeting with Lord Loudoun was extremely unfortunate. He was currently suffering losses in northern New York while trying to hold off the French and Indians. When he heard of what happened with the committeemen he argued that the current military crisis made it acceptable to quarter troops in private homes.

A bill was then brought to the governor to sign that said troops could be quartered in homes, but that innkeepers had the right to complain to a judge if they felt too many soldiers were there. Loudoun was enraged with this and threatened to order his troops quarter themselves in private residences again. By the end of December, the Massachusetts legislature was able to get Loudoun to agree to quarter his troops at Castle William.

On 3 May 1765 the British Parliament met and finally passed a Quartering Act for the American colonies. The act stated that troops could only be quartered in barracks and if there wasn't enough space in barracks then they were to be quartered in public houses and inns. If there was still not enough space, then the governor and council were to find vacant space, but at no time was it legal to quarter troops in private homes. During the American Revolutionary War, the New York Provincial Congress forcibly barracked Continental Army troops in private homes.

== Modern relevance ==
Grievance 13 of the 27 Grievances section of the United States Declaration of Independence listing the colonies' grievances against the King explicitly notes:

He has combined with others to subject us to a jurisdiction foreign to our constitution, and unacknowledged by our laws; giving his Assent to their Acts of pretended Legislation: For quartering large bodies of armed troops among us.

The Third Amendment to the United States Constitution expressly prohibited the military from peacetime quartering of troops without consent of the owner of the house. A product of their times, the relevance of the Acts and the Third Amendment has greatly declined since the era of the American Revolution, having been the subject of only one case in over 200 years, Engblom v. Carey in 1982.

The Quartering Act has been cited as one of the reasons for the Second Amendment to the United States Constitution, which prohibits infringing on the right of the people to keep and bear arms. Standing armies were mistrusted, and the First Congress considered quartering of troops to have been one of the tools of oppression before and during the American revolution.

== See also ==
- Billeting
- Dragonnade
- Mutiny Acts

== Bibliography ==
- Ammerman, David (1974). In the Common Cause: American Response to the Coercive Acts of 1776. Charlottesville: University of Virginia. ISBN 0-8139-0525-7.
- Ammerman, David (1999). "The Tea Crisis and its Consequences, through 1775". In Greene, Jack P.; Pole, J. R. (eds.). The Blackwell Encyclopedia of the American Revolution. Malden, Massachusetts: Blackwell.
- Kammen, Michael (1975). Colonial New York, A History. ISBN 978-0-684-14325-5.
- Ketchum, Richard (2002). Divided Loyalties, How the American Revolution Came to New York. ISBN 978-0-8050-6120-8.
- Rogers, J. Alan (February 1970). "Colonial Opposition to the Quartering of Troops During the French and Indian War". Military Affairs. 34 (1): 7–11. doi:10.2307/1984545. JSTOR 1984545.
- Schecter, Barnet (2002). The Battle of New York. ISBN 978-0-8027-1374-2.
- Cannon, John (2009). 'Intolerable Acts', The Oxford Companion to British History. ISBN 978-0-19-956763-8.
- Gerlach, Don (1966). "A Note on the Quartering Act of 1774". The New England Quarterly. 39 (1). The New England Quarterly Inc.: 80–88. doi:10.2307/363643. JSTOR 363643.
