= Sir Thomas Darnell, 1st Baronet =

English landowner

Sir Thomas Darnell, 1st Baronet (died c. 1638) was an English landowner, at the centre of a celebrated state legal case in the reign of Charles I of England, often known as the 'Five Knights' Case' but to the lawyers of the period Darnell's Case.

== Life ==
Escutcheon of Sir Thomas Darnell, 1st Baronet

Darnell was a landowner with estates in Lincolnshire. He was created a baronet, of Heyling in the County of Lincoln, at Whitehall on 6 September 1621. He was committed to the Fleet Prison in March 1627, by warrant signed only by the attorney-general, for having refused to subscribe to the forced loan of that year. Application for a habeas corpus having been made on his behalf, the writ was issued returnable on 8 November 1627. The case came on for argument on 15 November. Meanwhile, a warrant for Darnell's detention had been signed by two privy councillors, in which, however, no ground for confinement was alleged except the special command of the king.

Darnell was represented by Serjeant-at-law John Bramston, but asked for time to consider his new position, which being granted, he was remanded. The cases of his four comrades, John Corbet, Walter Earle, John Heveningham, and Edmund Hampden, were proceeded with, Bramston, William Noy, William Calthorpe, and John Selden being for the applicants, and the attorney-general, Robert Heath, representing the crown. On 22 November Chief-justice Nicholas Hyde gave judgment, in which his colleagues John Doddridge, Jones, and James Whitelocke concurred, to the effect that the returns to the writs were sufficient.

The prisoners remained in custody until 29 January 1628, when they were released. Darnell was living in 1634, and died before 1640. By his wife Sara, daughter of Thomas Fisher, and sister of Sir Thomas Fisher, bart., he had no male issue.

Baronetage of England
New creation	Baronet (of Heyling); 1621–c. 1638	Extinct
