= Benevolence (tax) =

English tax of the 15th to 17th century

A benevolence, also called a loving contribution, voluntary contribution or free gift, was a type of tax imposed by several English monarchs from the 15th to the 17th century. Although taken under the guise of a charitable contribution to the monarch, the money was in fact extorted from the monarch's subjects. Commissioners or letters were sent from town to town, detailing the financial need of the monarch and asking that the town's wealthiest pay. The requested could not refuse to give, unless they denied the monarch's need or professed their own poverty, a "doubtless difficult, if not virtually impossible" task. Benevolences allowed the monarch to raise money outside of Parliament, which traditionally had to authorise any tax the king proposed.

A benevolence was first imposed in 1473 by Edward IV. It ended lucratively for the king, and he made similar demands leading up to the 1482 invasion of Scotland which yielded yet more for the royal coffers. Despite this, the benevolences were extremely unpopular and gained Edward a "reputation for avarice". Richard III attempted to make similar exactions, but met with stringent condemnations of the taxes from Parliament which described them as unjust and unprecedented impositions. Richard's benevolences were not carried out and Parliament ultimately outlawed the practice in 1484.

Richard's deposer Henry VII sidestepped these statutes and imposed a benevolence in 1491. His actions were supported by Parliament, although not by the whole populace, and earned him £48,000. Henry VIII levied yet more benevolences in 1525 and 1545: the first ending in rebellion and withdrawal, and the second ending with a profit of £120,000. During Elizabeth I's half-century long reign, benevolences were only raised a few times in the 1580s and 1590s, and then only to small subsets of the population, and raising small amounts. Benevolences had grown increasingly unpopular, criticised by contemporary writers to the ire of Elizabeth's government. The last benevolence of the Tudor period was levied in 1599.

Benevolences were revived when James I, meeting with an obstinate Parliament, used them to augment his treasury extra-parliamentarily in 1614. This proved successful, but a further benevolence in 1620 to support Frederick V of the Palatinate did not, forcing James to call Parliament the following year. A final benevolence was collected in 1661 by Charles II following his restoration.

== Exaction ==
Benevolences were exacted from the public by methods essentially the same as those of forced loans. Commissioners, typically gentlemen, would travel from town to town supplied with rationales for the benevolence, commonly bearing upon to the safety of the kingdom, and approach the gentlemen of the town to give this justification and ask for a gift. Alternatively, letters under the monarch's authority were sent to the town's wealthiest individuals emphasising this danger. Benevolences were usually put forth as an alternative to military service in a time of crisis, the subject obliged to help the king in other ways. Legally these contributions were considered voluntary, but in practice subjects usually could not refuse the request, and were only able to dispute how much they would give. The only way to escape the obligation would be to deny the necessity, or plead poverty, a task which was—as one historian has put it—"doubtless difficult, if not virtually impossible".

== Late medieval invention: 1473–84 ==
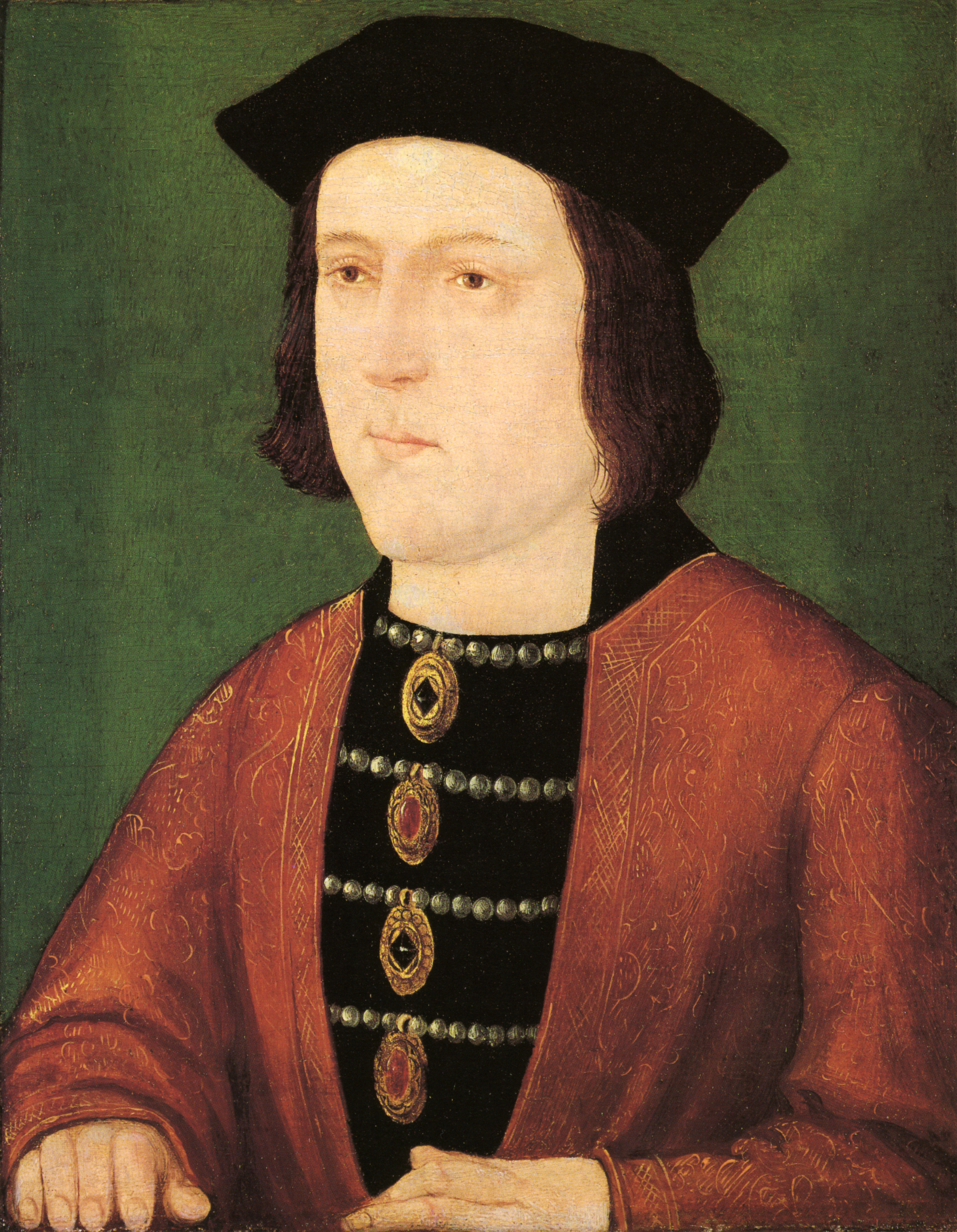
Edward IV (r. 1461–83) was the first English king to impose benevolences.

According to English medievalist G. L. Harriss, the concept of benevolence in financing the monarch's activities goes back to the early 14th century, when the exhortations to pay taxes or loans to the crown first exhibited a common "emphasis on these twin features of obligation and benevolence."

The first English king to impose a benevolence proper was Edward IV in 1473. He had earlier imposed forced loans, but the term "benevolence" allowed Edward to jettison the expectation of having to repay his subjects. Additionally, forced loans were expected to only be imposed within the bounds of reason, while good will to a king was supposed to be limitless. Benevolences were, for Edward's purposes, a new form of extra-parliamentary taxation, by which he could compound the already heavy taxes of the 1470s. These benevolences were justified with reference to the supposedly looming threat of France to the realm, for which the king proposed to lead his army in person. In total, the king raised £21,000, (Note: £21,000 in 1473 equates to approximately £32,300,000 in 2025, according to calculations based on retail price index measure of inflation.) a remarkable amount, more than three times what the king had raised with the income tax of 1450. The king made similar impositions from 1480 to 1482, to fund the English invasion of Scotland in 1482. The yield of this benevolence surpassed that of 1473, bordering on £30,000. (Note: £30,000 in 1482 equates to approximately £26,000,000 in 2025, according to calculations based on retail price index measure of inflation.) These developments became an incredibly unpopular aspect of Edward's rule. Dominic Mancini, an Italian who visited England at the close of Edward's reign, commented that Edward had acquired a "reputation for avarice" for his unending pursuit of riches through such methods, a reputation which was by then "publically proclaimed".

Richard III attempted to make a similar demand several times, but met with the stringent opposition of Parliament. In Parliament, the benevolences were disparaged as "a new imposicion [...] wherby dyvers yeres [in various years] the subgettes and Comens [subjects and Commons] of this londe [land] agaynst their willes and fredome have paid grete sommes of money to their almost utter destruccion"; this sentiment was echoed by the ecclesiastical Croyland Chronicle, which chronicled "the laying of the new and unheard-of services of benevolence, where everyone gives what they want to, or more correctly do not want to." (Note: In the original Latin: "nova et inaudita impositio muneris ut per benevolentiam quilibet daret id quod vellet, immo verius quod nollet.") In 1484, one of the first acts to pass in Richard's only Parliament outlawed benevolences.

== Tudor usage: 1491–1599 ==
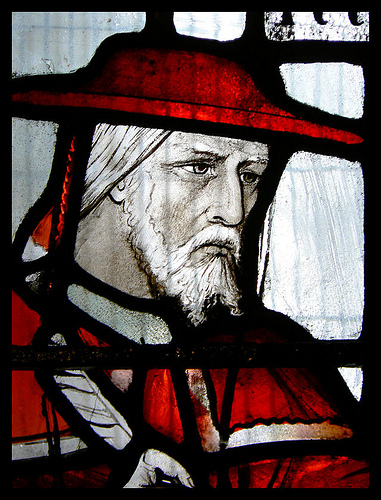
Cardinal John Morton was credited with an argument for Henry VII's first benevolence, known as Morton's Fork.

Having deposed Richard, Henry VII freely ignored this law, (Note: The benevolence was of questionable legality under Richard's statute, but there appears to be no evidence backing the assertion of some historians that the Tudors considered all statutes from Richard III's reign invalid.) making substantial use of benevolences during his reign, under the guise of "loving contributions". In 1491, seven years after the law had been passed, he employed commissioners to procure such gifts from his subjects. Additionally, earlier that year, Henry had called a Great Council to authorise him to levy this benevolence, giving the "contribution" at least the semblance of legitimacy and popular consent. Henry's Chancellor and Archbishop of Canterbury John Morton was credited with a widespread argument for this form of taxation: (Note: This argument was attributed to Morton solely by Francis Bacon, in his History of the Reign of King Henry VII. The same argument was attributed to royal supporter and clergyman Richard Foxe by Erasmus, citing Sir Thomas More.) if one lived modestly, one must be saving and so could afford a gift for the king; if one lived luxuriantly, one must have income to spare, which ought instead to be presented to the king. This argument was given the nickname "Morton's Fork", a term which entered the vernacular as an expression for any dilemma between two unpleasant options. Commissioners employed the argument against any unwilling subjects, to demand exorbitant amounts of money. Henry also used justifications similar to those Edward had employed 20 years earlier, whereby the threat of France was stressed—commissioners armed with the proclamation that "Charles of France not only unjustly occupies the king's kingdom of France, but threatens the destruction of England"—and the king proposed to personally lead the English army. The benevolence was proposed as an alternative to military service.

This action garnered retrospective support from Parliament, who used a 1496 act to enforce benevolence on threat of death. According to historian Roger Schofield, in the early Tudor period, benevolences were used only to anticipate or supplement "the collection of duly authorised taxes from a small number of wealthy subjects", rather than as a means of "superseding parliamentary grants". Indeed, the Great Chronicle remarked that the toll caused "less grugge of hys comons" than previous taxes, as only "men of good substaunce" were asked to contribute. However, historian Peter Holmes has maintained that the benevolence was "paid only with reluctance" among the taxed population, the Great Council's proclamation easing their irritation little. In sum, Henry VII raised £48,000 (Note: £48,000 in 1491 equates to approximately £44,000,000 in 2025, according to calculations based on retail price index measure of inflation.) with this benevolence, an amount exceeding any of his precursors'.

King Henry VIII continued his father's practice of benevolence. In 1525, he attempted to impose the Amicable Grant, a compulsory benevolence taken at a standard rate from large swathes of the population. It was expected to raise a whopping £333,000. (Note: £333,000 in 1525 equates to approximately £314,000,000 in 2025, according to calculations based on retail price index measure of inflation.) This proved extremely unpopular, as it deviated controversially from previous benevolences; these had been restricted to the wealthiest in the population, with the size of payments settled on an individual basis. It did not help that the Grant followed two large, and as yet unrepaid, forced loans the king had taken out in 1522 and 1523, together amounting to an owed £260,000. (Note: £260,000 in 1525 equates to approximately £245,200,000 in 2025, according to calculations based on retail price index measure of inflation.) Thus, many opposed the Grant on constitutional grounds. As historian Michael Bush put it, "[w]ith no assurance of repayment, and authorized neither by parliament nor convocation but simply by commission, it smacked of novelty and illegitimacy". The Amicable Grant's principal promoter, Cardinal Wolsey, faced criticism as a "subversor of the Lawes and Libertie of England". The commissioners of the Grant met with an unwilling populace, many of whom pleaded poverty to escape the tax. The compulsory aspect of the Grant was soon dropped and, after protests flared up in the South East, followed by riots in Suffolk and Essex, the benevolence was abandoned entirely.

Henry VIII again imposed a benevolence in 1545. Henry was more careful in averting rebellion this time: the fares were lowered and the threshold raised. Henry did not, however, shy away from severity in enforcing this benevolence; one London alderman was driven up to the Scottish border to fight the Scots as punishment for hesitance in paying his part. The political background of the 1540s was also of assistance: in the manifest French threat the 1545 Battle of the Solent had afforded, and the prosperity a spell of good harvests leading up to 1525 had provided. This ended in success, raising £120,000 (Note: £120,000 in 1545 equates to approximately £69,400,000 in 2025, according to calculations based on retail price index measure of inflation.) for the Crown.

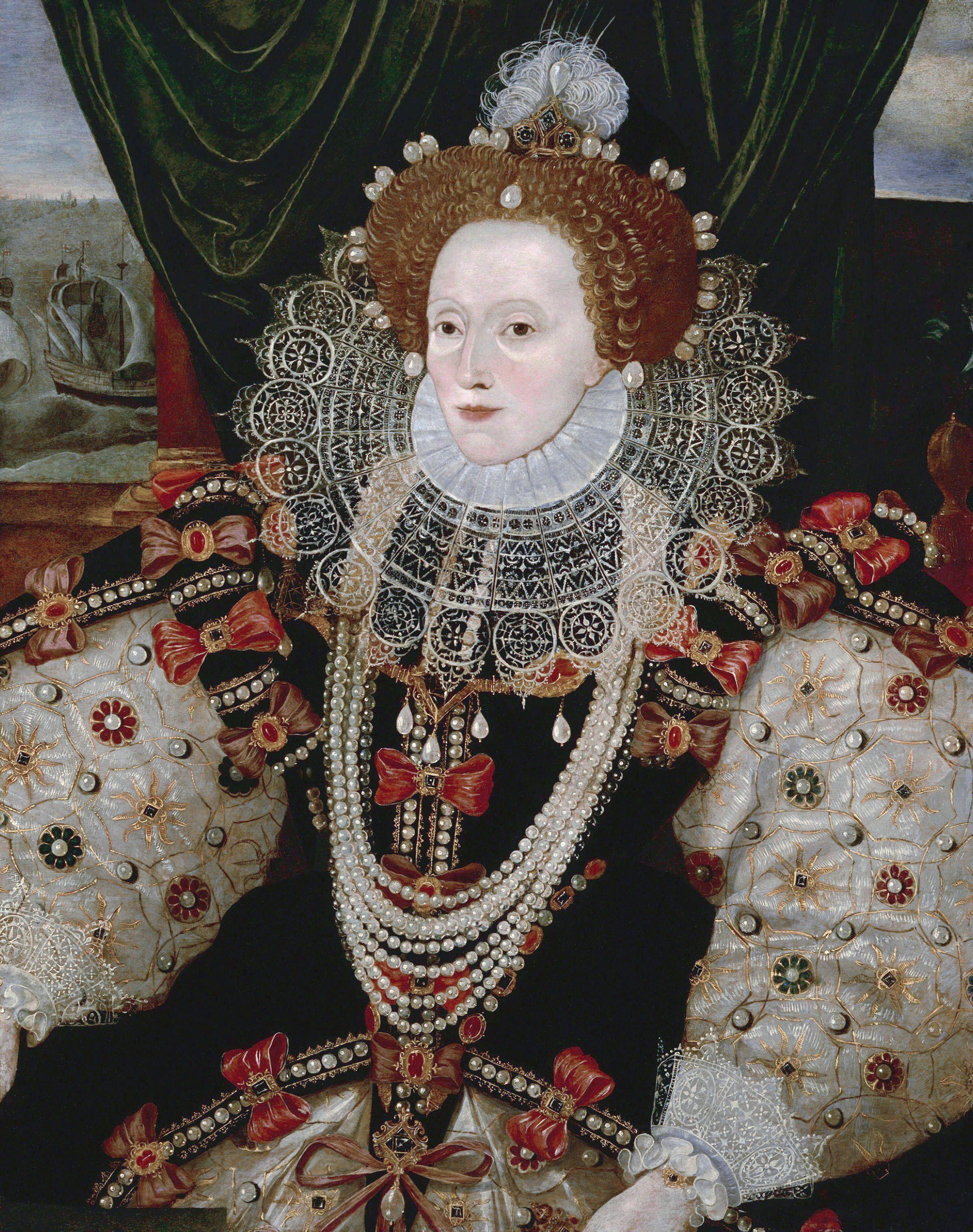
Elizabeth I (r. 1558–1603) was more averse to benevolences than her forerunners, demanding only a handful in the 1580s and 1590s.

The first benevolence to be raised in Elizabeth I's reign was foisted upon the clergy in the 1580s. In raising the £21,000 (Note: £21,000 in 1580 equates to approximately £8,300,000 in 2025, according to calculations based on retail price index measure of inflation.) needed to repair Dover Harbour, which had deteriorated steadily since its construction by Henry VIII, Elizabeth's Privy Council resolved to find a way to extract this sum from the nation. Alongside taxes on recusants, ships and alehouses, the Privy Council sent forth a benevolence to the church, urging wealthy clergymen to donate at least one tenth their income for 3 years to fund the repairs. Ultimately, the benevolence took 5 years to collect, and the funding of the repair came to rely predominately on ship tariffs. However, the idea of benevolences on the clergy did come to inspire future financial actions in Elizabeth's reign.

Prompted by the financially taxing French campaigns of the 1590s, Elizabeth's chief advisor and Lord High Treasurer Lord Burghley drew up plans for a benevolence in 1594 of 3,000, expected to net the Queen £30,000, (Note: £30,000 in 1594 equates to approximately £8,200,000 in 2025 according to calculations based on retail price index measure of inflation.) but these plans were never put into practice. In 1596, another benevolence was levied on the clergy to fund the Anglo-Spanish War, but the clergy were so unwilling that it was apparently never collected. After the death of Treasurer Lord Burghley in 1598, the virtual bankruptcy of the Tudor state came to light; a few days after his death, a rumour was spreading in London which alleged the Queen's had only £20,000 (Note: £20,000 in 1598 equates to approximately £4,500,000 in 2025, according to calculations based on retail price index measure of inflation.) in her treasury. In the midst of several loans to the government, a benevolence was asked in 1599 of lawyers and officers in several government offices. The government was expected to levy another soon after, but instead the Crown sold off some of its land, generating a healthy sum of £212,000. (Note: £212,000 in 1599 equates to approximately £57,900,000 in 2025, according to calculations based on retail price index measure of inflation.)

Benevolences, alongside other forms of extra-parliamentary taxation, grew increasingly unpopular in Elizabeth's reign. Elizabeth used benevolences much less often than her predecessors, with the notable exception of those gifts expected of her subjects during Royal Progresses. Her government was also quick to deny the accusation of gratuitous exactions; Lord Burghley asserted, in a heated debate, that Elizabeth would never "accept any thing that had been given to her unwillingly", including benevolences "she had no need of". This did not save it from the satires of contemporary writers. Thomas Heywood, in his anonymously published play Edward IV (1599) depicted the benevolences of Edward's rule as tantamount to extortion, a demand which, historian Andrew Whittle comments, would be "all too familiar to Heywood's audience". Sir John Hayward's history The Life and Raigne of King Henrie IIII (1599) was considered to have satirised the crown on similar grounds, leading to an interrogation by Attorney General Sir Edward Coke where he forced a confession out of the middle-aged lawyer, asserting he had "selected a story 200 years old, and published it last year, intending the application of it to this time." Among the seditious points criticised by Coke in the work was the anachronistic portrayal of benevolences in Henry IV's reign.

== Stuart revival: 1614–33 ==
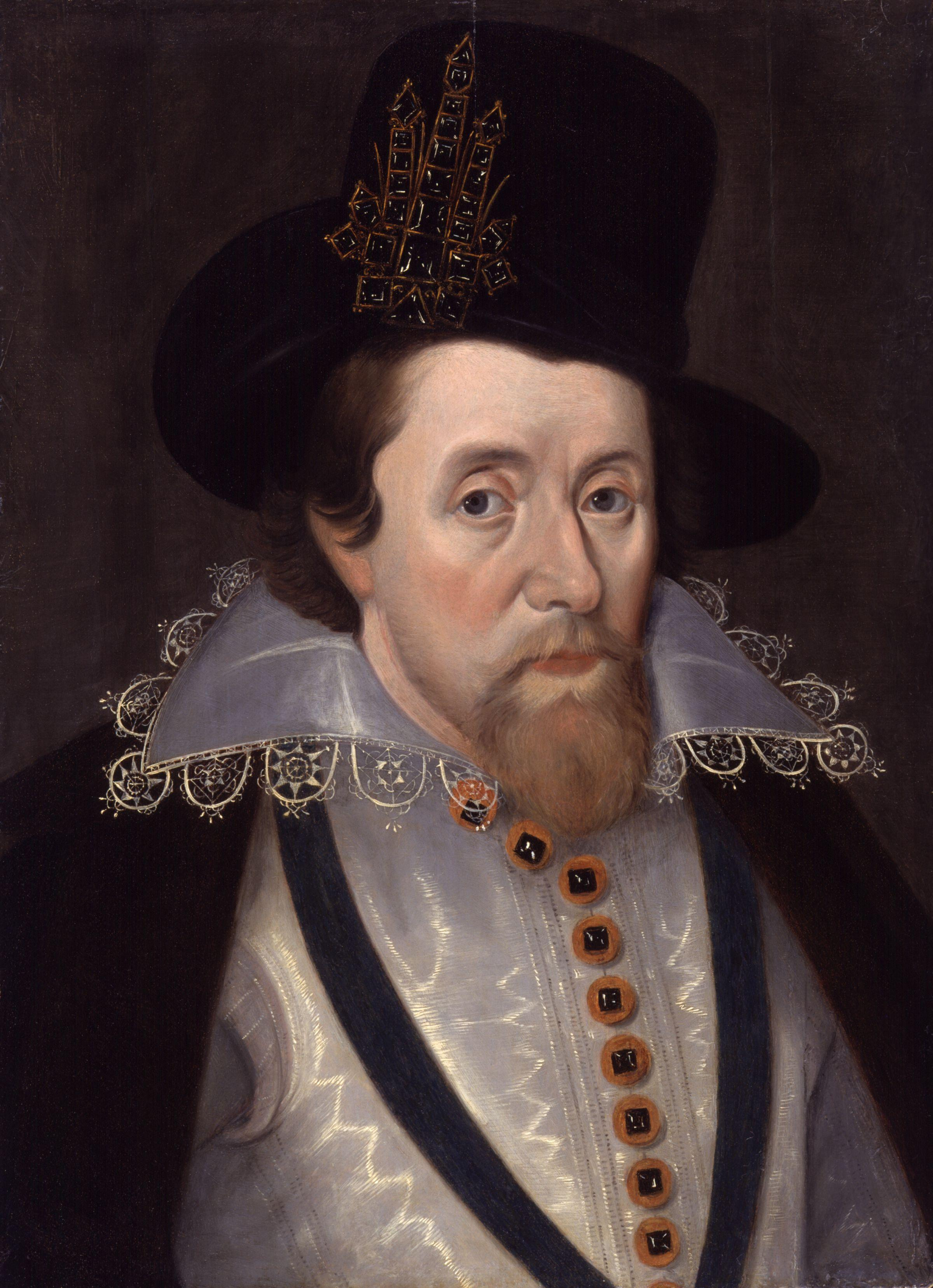
James I (r. 1603–25) revived the practice of benevolences in 1614.

After the relaxation of benevolences in Elizabeth's reign, benevolences were not raised again until near the end of James I's reign. Faced with an unyielding Parliament, James I resurrected the practice in 1614. He had already received large donations from the clergy, notably Archbishop Abbot, indicating his wealthy subjects were ready to support him. Letters were sent out detailing the compassion of those who had voluntarily contributed to the king in absence of parliamentary taxes, and inviting gentlemen to do the same. These were followed, only two months later, by letters urgently describing the defeat of many of England's allies on the Continent, and thus the necessity for contribution to the king's military fund. The benevolence met with protest but ultimately raised around £65,000, (Note: £65,000 in 1614 equates to approximately £14,100,000 in 2025, according to calculations based on retail price index measure of inflation.) owing to the support of these well-off subjects.

In 1620, James declared his intention to militarily support the recently overthrown Frederick V of the Palatinate. However, it was clear the barren royal coffers could not spare the price of such a military action, so James introduced another benevolence in February of that year. The cause of Frederick had become an extremely popular one in England, identified with the preservation of Protestantism on the Continent, and many notable figures made large contributions: then-heir-apparent Charles set out to pay £10,000; (Note: £10,000 in 1620 equates to approximately £2,500,000 in 2025, according to calculations based on retail price index measure of inflation.) each great lord was asked for £1,000; (Note: £1,000 in 1620 equates to approximately £200,000 in 2025, according to calculations based on retail price index measure of inflation.) and Secretary Robert Naunton promised to give £200 (Note: £200 in 1620 equates to approximately £50,000 in 2025, according to calculations based on retail price index measure of inflation.) a year to the war's end. The sum contributed was apparently unsatisfactory for the king, as he asked for another contribution in October and November, but an expected recession of corn prices meant many of the kingdom's wealthiest were unwilling to contribute as much as they had previously. In total, despite this apparent public support, James received only £30,000, (Note: £30,000 in 1620 equates to approximately £7,500,000 in 2025, according to calculations based on retail price index measure of inflation.) less than half of what he had earned previously, and so was forced to call the Parliament of 1621 to raise taxes. However, once this Parliament had dissolved, James imposed another benevolence in early 1622. This met with opposition—one contemporary pamphlet reported the populace not only opposed it on the basis of their own poverty but the former abolition of benevolences by parliament, which they still upheld—but managed to bring in over £116,000 (Note: £116,000 in 1622 equates to approximately £23,900,000 in 2025, according to calculations based on retail price index measure of inflation.) in total, almost as substantial as the funds Parliament had raised the previous year.

After this, no further benevolences were collected, though they were proposed two more times near the end of James' reign, in 1622 and 1625.

Upon accession to the throne, Charles’ first parliament was deemed by him the Useless Parliament because they would not give to him Tonnage and poundage except as a yearly thing. Monarchs til then had been accustomed to receive it for life. The next Parliament was dismissed by him for like reasons, whereupon Charles resorted to a Benevolence. The uproar this caused in 1627 led directly to 1628’s Petition of Right.

In 1633, Charles I allowed diplomat Francis Nethersole to collect a benevolence on behalf of the recently widowed wife of Frederick V, Elizabeth Stuart, but an ensuing dispute between Nethersole and one of the king's in-laws caused the plans to be abandoned.

Although they were not classed as benevolances, the payments known as coat and conduct money paying for the equipping and travel of troops was a forced loan in that the money had to be lent to the government and was often treated as a tax. These were levied both in the first half of the Anglo-Spanish War (1625–1630) and with less success in the Bishops' Wars in 1639 and 1640.

== Charles II ==
A final benevolence was collected in 1661 when Charles II urgently needed funds following the Stuart Restoration. The enabling act entituled "An Act for a free and voluntary present to his Majesty" became known as the Illegality of Benevolences Act due to its final clause which declared that no future benevolences could be issued without authority of parliament, and that the act must not be used as a precedent for future such demands.

== Sources ==
- Boyer, Allen D. (2003). Sir Edward Coke and the Elizabethan Age. Stanford, CA: Stanford University Press. ISBN 978-0-8047-4809-4.
- Braddick, Michael J. (1996). The Nerves of State: Taxation and the Financing of the English State, 1558-1714. New Frontiers in History. Manchester: Manchester University Press. ISBN 978-0-7190-3871-6.
- Bush, Michael (October 1991). "Tax Reform and Rebellion in Early Tudor England". History. 76 (248): 379–400. doi:10.1111/j.1468-229X.1991.tb01539.x. JSTOR 24421380.
- Bush, Michael (2009). The Pilgrims' Complaint: A Study of Popular Thought in the Early Tudor North. Catholic Christendom, 1300-1700. Ashgate Publishing. ISBN 978-0-7546-6785-8.
- Chrimes, S. B. (1972). Henry VII. Berkeley and Los Angeles: University of California Press. ISBN 978-0-520-02266-9.
- Cramsie, John (2002). Kingship and Crown Finance under James VI and I, 1603–1625. Royal Historical Society Studies in History (New Series). Suffolk: The Boydell Press. ISBN 978-0-86193-259-7.
- Croft, Pauline (2003). King James (eBook ed.). London: Palgrave Macmillan. doi:10.1007/978-1-4039-9017-4. ISBN 978-1-4039-9017-4.
- Dietz, Frederick C. (1964a). English Government Finance, 1485–1558. English Public Finance, 1485–1641. Vol. 1 (2nd ed.). London: Frank Cass & Co. OCLC 873931199.
- Dietz, Frederick C. (1964b). English Public Finance, 1558–1641. English Public Finance, 1485–1641. Vol. 2 (2nd ed.). New York: Barnes & Noble, Inc. OCLC 22976184.
- Gunn, S. J. (1995). Early Tudor Government, 1485–1558. London: Palgrave Macmillan. ISBN 978-0-333-48065-6.
- Harris, Tim (2014). Rebellion: Britain's First Stuart Kings, 1567-1642. OUP. ISBN 978-0199209002.
- Harriss, G. L. (1963). "Aids, Loans and Benevolences". The Historical Journal. 6 (1): 1–19. doi:10.1017/S0018246X00000881. JSTOR 3020547.
- Holmes, Peter (October 1986). "The Great Council in the Reign of Henry VII". The English Historical Review. 101 (401): 840–862. doi:10.1093/ehr/ci.cccci.840. JSTOR 570643.
- Schofield, Roger (2004). Taxation under the Early Tudors, 1485-1547 (eBook ed.). Oxford: Blackwell. ISBN 978-0-470-75829-8.
- Schwoerer, Lois G. (1974). 'No Standing Armies!' The Antiarmy Ideology in Seventeenth-Century England. Baltimore and London: The Johns Hopkins University Press. ISBN 978-0-8018-1563-8.
- Tanner, J. R. (1922). Tudor Constitutional Documents, AD 1485-1603 with an Historical Commentary. Cambridge: Cambridge University Press. OCLC 460679802.
- Virgoe, R. (January 1989). "The Benevolence of 1481". The English Historical Review. 104 (410): 25–45. doi:10.1093/ehr/CIV.CCCCX.25. JSTOR 571014.
- White, Jason (2016). Militant Protestantism and British Identity, 1603–1642. Warfare, Society and Culture. Routledge. ISBN 978-1-317-32392-1.
- Whittle, Andrew (2017). The Historical Reputation of Edward IV 1461–1725 (PhD). University of East Anglia. OCLC 1064494434.
