= Roger Schofield =

British social scientist

Roger Snowden Schofield, FBA, FRHistS, FSS (26 August 1937 – 8 April 2019) was a British social scientist, social historian, demographer and academic. He was director of the Cambridge Group for the History of Population and Social Structure between 1974 and 1994, and a fellow of Clare College, Cambridge, from 1969 until his death.

Schofield was born on 26 August 1937 and educated at Leighton Park School and Clare College, Cambridge, where he completed his undergraduate and doctoral studies.

Having completed his PhD in 1963, Schofield was appointed a research assistant to the Cambridge Group for the History of Population and Social Structure in 1966. He was appointed the Group's director in 1974; he stepped down in 1994, but remained involved with the Group as a senior research associate until retiring in 1998. He had also been elected to a fellowship at Clare College in 1969. Schofield served as president of the British Society for Population Studies from 1985 to 1987 and was elected a Fellow of the Royal Historical Society in 1970, a Fellow of the Royal Statistical Society in 1987 and a Fellow of the British Academy (the United Kingdom's national academy for the humanities and social sciences) in 1988. The University of Cambridge awarded him a higher doctorate in 2005. Schofield died on 8 April 2019.

== Publications ==
- (Co-authored with Tony Wrigley) The Population History of England 1541–1871: A Reconstruction (Edward Arnold, 1981).
- (Co-edited with John Walter) Famine, Disease, and the Social Order in Early Modern Society, Cambridge Studies in Population, Economy and Society in Past Time (Cambridge University Press, 1989).
- (Co-authored with Tony Wrigley, R. S. Davies and Jim Oeppen) English Population History from Family Reconstitution 1580–1837, Cambridge Studies in Population, Economy and Society in Past Time (Cambridge University Press, 1997).
- Taxation Under the Early Tudors 1485–1547 (Blackwell, 2004).
