= Coat and conduct money =

Coat and conduct money was a tax by the English monarch to pay for armed forces.

It was designed to cover the cost of soldiers' uniforms ("coat") and feeding and lodging the men between the county from which they were recruited to the port of embarkation ("conduct").

It was paid locally by the counties and reimbursed by the government either as a loan repaid to a representative of the local government or paid from government funds held in the county. It had been used by Elizabeth I and was the only method available for the transport of troops at the beginning of her reign. Because it was exercised through royal prerogative it became contentious because it lacked parliamentary approval. Although the government often repaid, there were delays and failures that caused discontent.

To fund the war with Spain, Charles I through the Privy Council, especially from 1626 through 1628, charged deputy lieutenants with collecting the money and it featured in the petition of right in 1628. During the 1639 and 1640 Bishops' Wars many refused demands for coat and conduct money fearing if they did, Charles would turn them into permanent taxes and the Short Parliament cited coat and conduct money as a grievance. It helped to break the system for collecting ship money and was regarded as more contentious. It was however levied by Parliament in the Civil War.

== Sources ==
- Cruickshank, C.G. (1966). Elizabeth's Army (2nd ed.). Oxford: Oxford University Press.
- Firth, C. H.; Rait, R. S., eds. (1911). Acts and Ordinances of the Interregnum, 1642–1660. London: His Majesty's Stationery Office – via British History Online.
- Gregg, Pauline (1984). King Charles I. Berkeley: University of California Press.
- Harris, Tim (2014). Rebellion: Britain's First Stuart Kings, 1567-1642. OUP. ISBN 978-0199209002.
- Schwoerer, Lois G. (1974). 'No Standing Armies!' The Antiarmy Ideology in Seventeenth-Century England. Baltimore and London: The Johns Hopkins University Press. ISBN 978-0-8018-1563-8.
- Joseph Stevenson, ed. (1865). "Elizabeth: November 1560, 21–30". Calendar of State Papers Foreign, Elizabeth, Volume 3: 1560–1561. Institute of Historical Research.
