= 2nd Parliament of Charles I =

The Second Parliament of Charles I was summoned after the earlier Useless Parliament by Charles I of England on 26 December 1625 in another attempt to solve his growing monetary problems.

== Reaction to the First Parliament ==
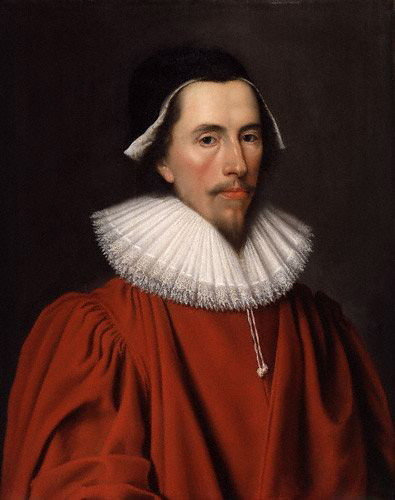
Sir Heneage Finch, Speaker

The King deliberately set out to secure a more docile body than his 1st Parliament by attempting to reduce the numerical strength of his opponents that were returned to the House of Commons. The main tactic he employed was to ensure that a number of the people who were potentially troublesome MPs were chosen to be sheriffs of their county. This prevented the MPs from being elected to parliament since a sheriff was expected to remain within his county during his period in office.

Charles also raised some other potential trouble makers to aristocratic titles which again made them ineligible for the Commons. Of course, this tactic gave them an automatic place in the House of Lords, which at least one of the new lords used to continue his attacks on Charles’ policies.

== Initial meeting ==
The newly chosen members of the House of Commons met for the first time at Westminster on 6 February 1626, a four days after Charles’ coronation. The first business was the election of a Speaker. Having chosen Sir Heneage Finch as Speaker, the Commons then had to decide who would preach to them at their first service in St Margaret's, Westminster, which the Commons preferred to Westminster Abbey because the Abbey services involved rituals with which the Puritans felt uncomfortable. The commons rejected John Donne, Dean of St Paul's and chose instead the Dean of Canterbury. Having decided this weighty issue, the Commons could turn its attention to the other matters facing the country.

== Issues ==
Although this session of parliament had been called by the King to address his financial problems, the Commons continued to have other ideas about the country's priorities. The topic they considered most significant was the role of the Duke of Buckingham as the King's advisor. For a while, the issue remained beneath the surface, but a large section of the Commons was determined to attack his authority when the opportunity arose. In the meantime, they once again ensured that the Commons did not grant the King any new taxes while Buckingham remained in office. In the end, it was the opposition of the Commons to Buckingham that led to the dissolution of Parliament.

The Commons were anxious to separate the King from his advisors. To some extent it was a polite fiction that the King was not himself behaving wrongly, but that he was badly advised. However, among many members of parliament there was a genuine dislike for the Duke of Buckingham. Buckingham had originally been a favourite of James I and had a great deal of contact with Charles while he was growing up. With the accession of Charles as king, Buckingham began to play an ever-growing role in the formulation and execution of policy. The Commons openly criticised him and would not provide the King with money until their complaints about him had been addressed. On 18 March, the house considered the report from the committee for evils, causes and remedies which put forward six complaints about the Duke of Buckingham.

== Dissolution and after ==
Charles attempted to intimidate the Commons into granting him his revenue before it considered Buckingham's impeachment. However, the members of the Commons were in no mood to back down. Instead, the attacks on Buckingham intensified. On 15 June, Charles I dissolved the parliament of 1626 before it had voted him any significant new money in order to prevent Buckingham being impeached. When asked by a group of Peers to delay the dissolution, Charles replied “not by a second”.

Guided by Buckingham, Charles determined to exact from his subjects Benevolence (tax), and imposed a penalty of imprisonment should the subject refuse. This led directly to Darnell’s Case.

== See also ==
- List of MPs elected to the English parliament in 1626
- List of parliaments of England
