= 3rd Parliament of Charles I =

Parliament of England session 1628–29

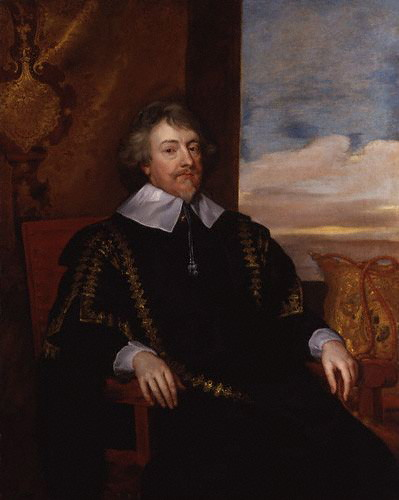
The Speaker, John Finch, 1st Baron Finch

The 3rd Parliament of King Charles I was summoned by King Charles I of England on 31 January 1628 and first assembled on 17 March 1628. The elected Speaker of the House of Commons was Sir John Finch, the Member of Parliament for Canterbury.

== Historical context and assembly ==
Following the debacle of the previous Parliament—when Parliament had refused to grant the King funds until their concerns about his favourite, George Villiers, Duke of Buckingham, had been addressed—it had proved difficult to prosecute the war with Spain. When Charles' uncle, Christian IV of Denmark, was soundly defeated by Imperial forces at Lutter in August 1626, Charles needed funds urgently to go to Christian's aid. He therefore decided to bypass Parliament by levying a Forced Loan. This levying actually raised more money, some £243,000, than Parliament had been prepared to give him in exchange for Buckingham's impeachment. The money raised by the levy, the raising of which so alienated Parliament and its supporters, was spent on preparing to wage war on France after relations with that hitherto friendly country had deteriorated. When the Duke of Buckingham wanted to take a fleet to raise the siege at La Rochelle and was prevented by financial restraints, Charles reluctantly accepted the need to call this third Parliament.

== Parliament dealings with King Charles I ==
Once assembled, the Commons indicated that it would vote the King five subsidies in return for his acceptance of a Petition of Right, confirming the rights of the individual as against the divine right of the King. After much debate, prevarication and delay, the King finally backed down and gave his assent to the petition in such a way it could be considered law. The Subsidy Bill passed through its final stage in the House of Lords by 17 June 1628.

Parliament then turned its attention to tonnage and poundage, two onerous taxes on which the King was dependent, and which Parliament considered illegal. The King brought the session to a rapid close.

Over the summer the fleet to relieve La Rochelle was assembled, but the commander Buckingham was murdered by a disgruntled army officer. The fleet nevertheless sailed under a new commander, but achieved little success.

== Adjournment and dissolution ==
When Parliament reconvened in January 1629 it returned to the issue of tonnage and poundage, claiming that its continued imposition contradicted the aforementioned Petition of Right. Matters got so heated that Charles adjourned Parliament by proclamation on 2 March 1629 and had nine of the leading protagonists arrested, one of whom, Sir John Eliot, would die in the Tower of London three years later. Charles then dissolved Parliament in person on the 10 March and was so disillusioned that he did not recall it again until 1640.

== Notable acts passed by the Parliament ==
- Petition of Right
- Sunday Observance Act 1627

== See also ==
- List of MPs elected to the English parliament in 1628
- List of acts of the 3rd Parliament of King Charles I
- List of parliaments of England
