= Sir John Corbet, 1st Baronet, of Sprowston =

- Position held: Member of the 1624-25 Parliament, Member of the 1625 Parliament, Member of the 1626 Parliament

Sir John Corbet, 1st Baronet (c. 1589 – 19 January 1628) was MP for Norfolk between 1624 and 1625 and Yarmouth between 1625 and 1626.

He was the son of Sir Thomas Corbet of Sprowston, Norfolk, High Sheriff of Norfolk in 1612 and the elder brother of the regicide, Miles Corbet. He graduated as a B.A. at Cambridge University in 1612, was later captain of the Norfolk foot militia and a county magistrate for Norfolk.

His spent nearly a year imprisoned in Westminster gatehouse for refusing to support or pay the forced loan of 1628 in a case called Darnell's Case. He was released but died of smallpox shortly after and was buried at St Margaret's, Westminster.

He had married Anne Capel (died in about 1625), with whom he had two sons and three daughters. He was succeeded in turn by his sons John and Thomas. The baronetcy became extinct in 1661 on the death of Thomas.

Baronetage of England
New creation	Baronet (of Sprowston); 1623–1628	Succeeded by John Corbet
