= The Historical Journal =

- Discipline: History
- Language: English
- Edited by: Rachel Leow, John Gallagher

Publication details
- Former name: The Cambridge Historical Journal
- History: 1958–present
- Publisher: Cambridge University Press (United Kingdom)
- Frequency: Quarterly
- Impact factor: 0.8 (2022)

Standard abbreviations
- ISO 4: Hist. J.

Indexing
- ISSN: 0018-246X (print); 1469-5103 (web)
- LCCN: 62052664
- JSTOR: 0018246X
- OCLC no.: 301165981

Links
- Journal homepage; Online access; Online archive

The Historical Journal, formerly known as The Cambridge Historical Journal, is a peer-reviewed academic journal published by Cambridge University Press. It publishes approximately thirty-five articles per year on all aspects of British, European, and world history since the fifteenth century. In addition, each issue contains numerous review articles covering a wide range of historical literature. Contributing authors include historians of established academic reputation as well as younger scholars making their debut in the historical profession.

== History ==
The journal was founded in 1923 as The Cambridge Historical Journal by Harold Temperley. It obtained its present title in 1958 when the journal editors decided to adopt a more global perspective. Despite choosing to omit the Cambridge label from the latter date, it remained under the editorial leadership of the History Faculty at the University of Cambridge, as it does to this day.

Its current editors are Dr. Rachel Leow (Faculty of History, Cambridge University) and Dr John Gallagher (University of Leeds).

== Scope ==
The journal aims to publish around thirty-five articles and book reviews each year.

== Abstracting ==
The Historical Journal is abstracted by Social Sciences Citation Index, Arts and Humanities Citation Index, Historical Abstracts, Periodicals Index Online, Scopus, and ABELL, among others.

== See also ==
- Historiography
- Historiography of the United Kingdom
