= Richard Cumberland (philosopher) =

English philosopher and bishop

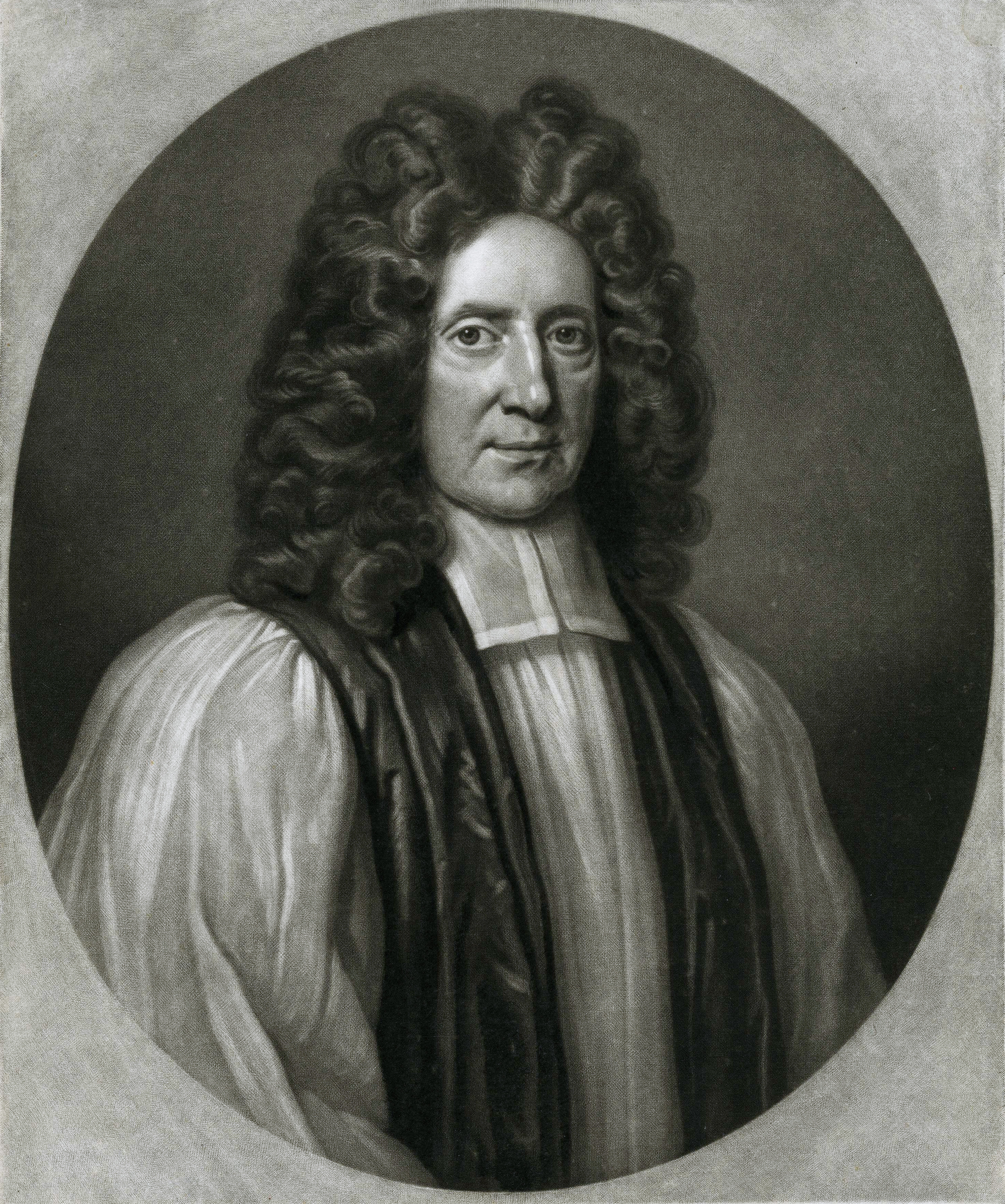
Richard Cumberland, engraving by John Smith after Thomas Murray.

Richard Cumberland (15 July 1631 (or 1632) – 9 October 1718) was an English philosopher, and Bishop of Peterborough from 1691. In 1672, he published his major work, De legibus naturae (On natural laws), propounding utilitarianism and opposing the egoistic ethics of Thomas Hobbes.

Cumberland was a member of the Latitudinarian movement, along with his friend Hezekiah Burton of Magdalene College, Cambridge and closely allied with the Cambridge Platonists, a group of ecclesiastical philosophers centred on Cambridge University in the mid 17th century.

== Early life ==
He was born in the parish of St Ann, near Aldersgate, where his father was a tailor. He was educated in St Paul's School, where Samuel Pepys was a friend, and from 1649 at Magdalene College, Cambridge, where he obtained a fellowship. He took the degree of BA in 1653; and, having proceeded to the MA in 1656, was incorporated the following year into the same degree in the University of Oxford.

For some time he studied medicine; and although he did not adhere to this profession, he retained his knowledge of anatomy and medicine. He took the degree of BD in 1663 and that of DD in 1680. Among his contemporaries and intimate friends were Hezekiah Burton, Sir Samuel Morland, who was distinguished as a mathematician, and Orlando Bridgeman, who became Lord Keeper of the Great Seal.

Cumberland's first preferment, bestowed upon him in 1658 by Sir John Norwich of the Rump Parliament, was the rectory of Brampton Ash in Northamptonshire. In 1661 he was appointed one of the twelve preachers of the university. The Lord Keeper, who obtained his office in 1667, invited him to London, and in 1670 secured for him the rectory of All Saints at Stamford. In this year Cumberland married Anne Quinsey. He acquired credit by the fidelity with which he discharged his duties. In addition to his ordinary work he undertook the weekly lecture.

== De legibus naturae ==
In 1672, at the age of forty, he published his earliest work, entitled De legibus naturae. It is dedicated to Sir Orlando Bridgeman, and is prefaced by an "Alloquium ad Lectorem," contributed by Hezekiah Burton. It appeared during the same year as Pufendorf's De jure naturae et gentium, and was highly commended in a subsequent publication by Pufendorf. Stephen Darwall writes that

the Treatise was regarded as one of the three great works of the modern natural law tradition,

the others being Grotius's On the Law of War and Peace, and Pufendorf's De jure naturae. It has been described as a

restatement of the doctrine of the law of nature as furnishing the ground of the obligation of all the moral virtues. The work is heavy in style, and its philosophical analysis lacks thoroughness; but its insistence on the social nature of man, and its doctrine of the common good as the supreme law of morality, anticipate the direction taken by much of the ethical thought of the following century.

(From The Cambridge History of English and American Literature in 18 Volumes (1907–21).)

English translations of the treatise were published in 1692, by James Tyrrell, and 1727, by John Maxwell.

== Other works ==
Cumberland next wrote An Essay towards the Recovery of the Jewish Measures and Weights (1686). This work, dedicated to Pepys, obtained a copious notice from Jean Leclerc, and was translated into French.

About this period he was apprehensive about the rise of Catholic influence. Sanchoniatho's Phoenician History, on the author usually now known as Sanchuniathon, was translated from the first book of Eusebius. According to Parkin, Cumberland's work was in an anti-Catholic vein, accounting for its posthumous appearance. His domestic chaplain and son-in-law, Squier Payne, edited it for publication soon after the bishop's death.

The preface contains an account by Payne of the life, character and writings of the author, published also in a separate form. A German translation by Johan Philip Cassel appeared under the title of Cumberlands phonizische Historie des Sanchoniathons (Magdeburg, 1755). The sequel to the work was likewise published by Payne: Origines gentium antiquissimae (1724).

== Later life ==
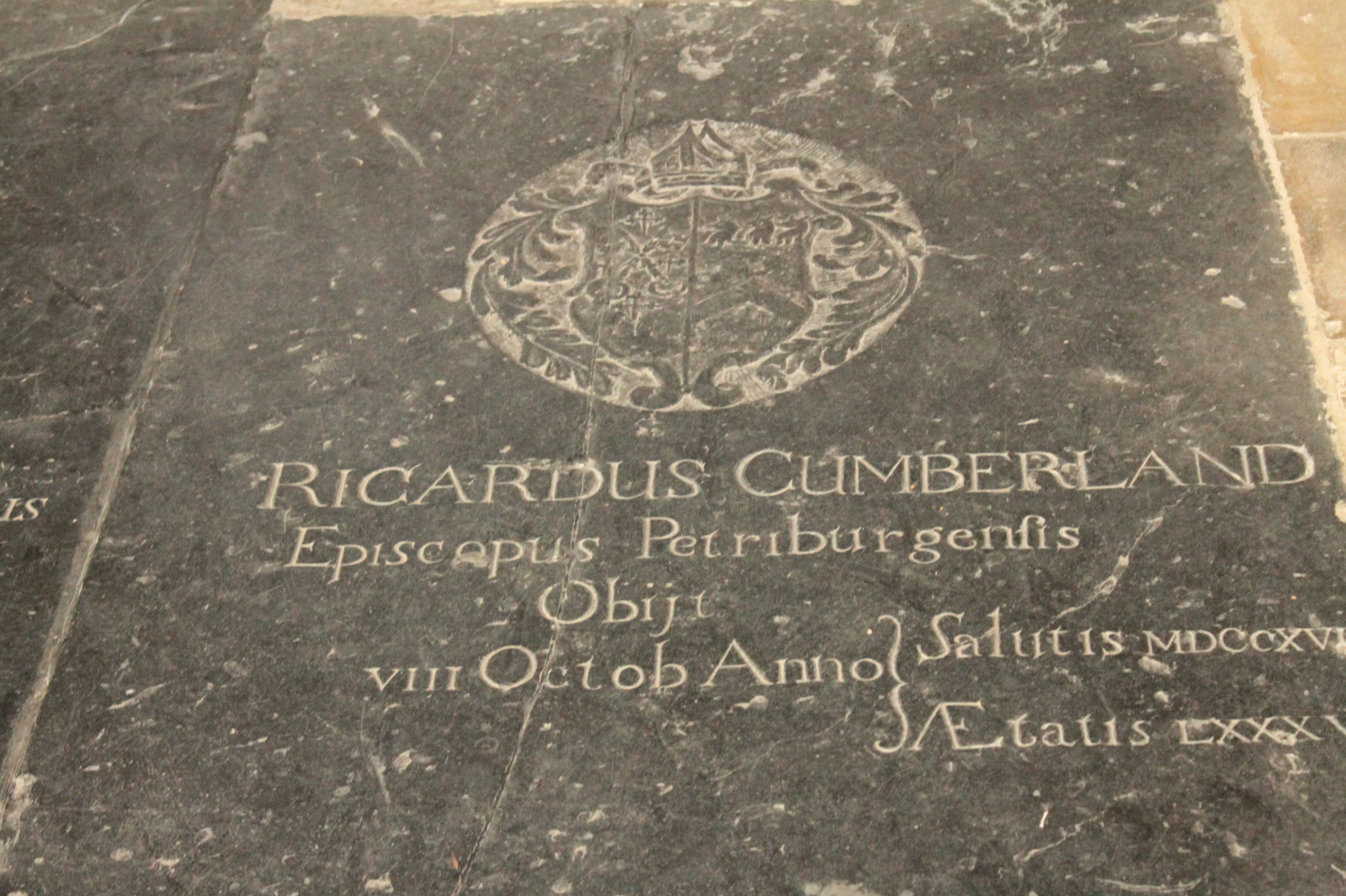
The grave of Richard Cumberland, Peterborough Cathedral

One day in 1691 he went, according to his custom on a post-day, to read the newspaper at a coffee-house in Stamford, and there, to his surprise, he read that the king had nominated him to the bishopric of Peterborough. The bishop elect was scarcely known at court, and he had resorted to none of the usual methods of advancing his temporal interest. "Being then sixty years old," says his great-grandson,

"he was with difficulty persuaded to accept the offer, when it came to him from authority. The persuasion of his friends, particularly Sir Orlando Bridgeman, at length overcame his repugnance; and to that see, though very moderately endowed, he for ever after devoted himself, and resisted every offer of translation, though repeatedly made and earnestly recommended. To such of his friends as pressed an exchange upon him he was accustomed to reply, that Peterborough was his first espoused, and should be his only one."

He discharged his new duties with energy and kept up his episcopal visitations till his eightieth year.

His charges to the clergy are described as plain and unambitious, the earnest breathings of a pious mind. When David Wilkins published the New Testament in Coptic (Novum Testamentum Aegyptium, vulgo Copticum, 1716) he presented a copy to the bishop, who began to study the language at the age of eighty-three. "At this age," says his chaplain, "he mastered the language, and went through great part of this version, and would often give me excellent hints and remarks, as he proceeded in reading of it."

He died on 8 October 1718, in the eighty-seventh year of his age; he was found sitting in his library, in the attitude of one asleep, and with a book in his hand. He was buried in Peterborough Cathedral the following day. The grave lies at the east end in a group of floor stones dedicated to the bishops.

His grandson was Denison Cumberland, who married Johanna (daughter of Richard Bentley), and his great-grandson was Richard Cumberland, the dramatist.

Bishop Cumberland was distinguished by his gentleness and humility. He could not be roused to anger, and spent his days in unbroken serenity. His favourite motto was that a man had better "wear out than rust out."

== Philosophical views ==
The philosophy of Cumberland is expounded in De legibus naturae. Its main design is to combat the principles which Hobbes had promulgated as to the constitution of man, the nature of morality, and the origin of society, and to prove that self-advantage is not the chief end of man, that force is not the source of personal obligation to moral conduct nor the foundation of social rights, and that the state of nature is not a state of war. The views of Hobbes seem to Cumberland utterly subversive of religion, morality and civil society. He endeavours, as a rule, to establish directly antagonistic propositions. He refrains, however, from denunciation, and is a fair opponent up to the measure of his insight.

The basis of his ethical theory is benevolence. According to Parkin (p. 141)

The De legibus naturae is a book about how individuals can discover the precepts of natural law and the divine obligation which lies behind it. [...] Could, or should, natural philosophy claim to be able to reveal substantial information about the nature of God's will, and also divine obligation? For writers who accepted a voluntarist and nominalist understanding of the relationship between God and man (both Cumberland and Hobbes), this was not an easy question to answer.

Darwall (p. 106) writes that Cumberland

follows Hobbes in attempting to provide a fully naturalistic account of the normative force of obligation and of the idea of a rational dictate, although he rejects Hobbes's theory that these derive entirely from instrumental rationality.

=== Laws of nature/natural laws ===
Laws of nature are defined by him as

immutably true propositions regulative of voluntary actions as to the choice of good and the avoidance of evil, and which carry with them an obligation to outward acts of obedience, even apart from civil laws and from any considerations of compacts constituting government.

This definition, he says, will be admitted by all parties. Some deny that such laws exist, but they will grant that this is what ought to be understood by them. There is thus common ground for the two opposing schools of moralists to join issue. The question between them is, Do such laws exist or do they not? In reasoning thus Cumberland obviously forgot what the position maintained by his principal antagonist really was.

Hobbes did not deny that there were laws of nature, laws antecedent to government, laws even in a sense eternal and immutable. The virtues as means to happiness seemed to him to be such laws. They precede civil constitution, which merely perfects the obligation to practise them. He expressly denied, however, that "they carry with them an obligation to outward acts of obedience, even apart from civil laws and from any consideration of compacts constituting governments."

Many besides Hobbes must have felt dissatisfied with the definition. It is ambiguous and obscure. In what sense is a law of nature a "proposition"? Is it as the expression of a constant relation among facts, or is it as the expression of a divine commandment? A proposition is never in itself an ultimate fact although it may be the statement of such a fact. And in what sense is a law of nature an "immutably true" proposition? Is it so because men always and everywhere accept and act on it, or merely because they always and everywhere ought to accept and act on it? The definition, in fact, explains nothing.

The existence of such laws may, according to Cumberland, be established in two ways. The inquirer may start either from effects or from causes. The former method had been taken by Hugo Grotius, Robert Sharrock and John Selden. They had sought to prove that there were universal truths, entitled to be called laws of nature, from the concurrence of the testimonies of many men, peoples and ages, and through generalizing the operations of certain active principles. Cumberland admits this method to be valid, but he prefers the other, that from causes to effects, as showing more convincingly that the laws of nature carry with them a divine obligation. It shows not only that these laws are universal, but that they were intended as such; that man has been constituted as he is in order that they might be. In the prosecution of this method he expressly declines to have recourse to what he calls "the short and easy expedient of the Platonists," the assumption of innate ideas of the laws of nature.

He thinks it ill-advised to build the doctrines of natural religion and morality on a hypothesis which many philosophers had rejected, and which could not be proved against Epicureans, the principal impugners of the existence of laws of nature. He cannot assume, he says, that such ideas existed from eternity in the divine mind, but must start from the data of sense and experience, and thence by search into the nature of things to discover their laws. It is only through nature that we can rise to nature's God. His attributes are not to be known by direct intuition. He, therefore, held that the ground taken up by the Cambridge Platonists could not be maintained against Hobbes.

His sympathies, however, were all on their side, and he would do nothing to diminish their chances of success. He would not even oppose the doctrine of innate ideas, because it looked with a friendly eye upon piety and morality. He granted that it might, perhaps, be the case that ideas were both born with us and afterwards impressed upon us from without.

=== Ethical theory ===
Cumberland's ethical theory is summed up in his principle of universal benevolence, the source of moral good. "No action can be morally good which does not in its own nature contribute somewhat to the happiness of men."

Cumberland's Benevolence is, deliberately, the precise antithesis to the egoism of Hobbes. Cumberland maintained that the whole-hearted pursuit of the good of all contributes to the good of each and brings personal happiness; that the opposite process involves misery to individuals including the self. Cumberland never appealed to the evidence of history, although he believed that the law of universal benevolence had been accepted by all nations and generations; and he abstains from arguments founded on revelation, feeling that it was indispensable to establish the principles of moral right on nature as a basis.

His method was the deduction of the propriety of certain actions from the consideration of the character and position of rational agents in the universe. He argues that all that we see in nature is framed so as to avoid and reject what is dangerous to the integrity of its constitution; that the human race would be an anomaly in the world had it not for end its conservation in its best estate; that benevolence of all to all is what in a rational view of the creation is alone accordant with its general plan; that various peculiarities of man's body indicate that he has been made to co-operate with his fellow men and to maintain society; and that certain faculties of his mind show the common good to be more essentially connected with his perfection than any pursuit of private advantage. The whole course of his reasoning proceeds on, and is pervaded by, the principle of final causes.

=== Utilitarianism ===
He may be regarded as the founder of English utilitarianism. His utilitarianism is distinct from the individualism of some later utilitarians; it goes to the contrary extreme, by almost absorbing individual in universal good. To the question, "What is the foundation of rectitude?," he replies, the greatest good of the universe of rational beings. This is a version of utilitarianism.

Nor does it look merely to the lower pleasures, the pleasures of sense, for the constituents of good, but rises above them to include especially what tends to perfect, strengthen and expand our true nature. Existence and the extension of our powers of body and mind are held to be good for their own sakes without respect to enjoyment.

Cumberland's views on this point were long abandoned by utilitarians as destroying the homogeneity and self-consistency of their theory; but John Stuart Mill and some other writers have reproduced them as necessary to its defence against charges not less serious than even inconsistency. The answer which Cumberland gives to the question, "Whence comes our obligation to observe the laws of nature?," is that happiness flows from obedience, and misery from disobedience to them, not as the mere results of a blind necessity, but as the expressions of the divine will.

=== Reward and punishment ===
Reward and punishment, supplemented by future retribution, are, in his view, the sanctions of the laws of nature, the sources of our obligation to obey them. To the other great ethical question, How are moral distinctions apprehended?, he replies that it is by means of right reason. But by right reason he means merely the power of rising to general laws of nature from particular facts of experience. It is no peculiar faculty or distinctive function of mind; it involves no original element of cognition; it begins with sense and experience; it is gradually generated and wholly derivative.

This doctrine lies only in germ in Cumberland, but will be found in full flower in Hartley, Mackintosh and later associationists.

== Works (full titles) ==
- Cumberland, Richard (1672). De legibus naturae disquisitio philosophica, in qua earum forma, summa capita, ordo, promulgatio, et obligatio e rerum natura investigantur; quin etiam elementa philosophiae Hobbianae, cum moralis tum civilis, considerantur et refutantur. London.
- An Essay towards the Recovery of the Jewish Measures and Weights, comprehending their Monies; by help of ancient standards, compared with ours of England: useful also to state many of those of the Greeks and Romans, and the Eastern Nations. London. 1686.
- Sanchoniatho's Phoenician History: Translated from the First Book of Eusebius De Praeparatione Evangelica. With a Continuation of Sanchoniatho's History by Eratosthenes Cyrenaeus's Canon, which Dicaearchus connects with the First Olympiad. These Authors are illustrated with many Historical and Chronological Remarks, proving them to contain a Series of Phoenician and Egyptian Chronology, from the first Man to the first Olympiad, agreeable to the Scripture Accounts. London. 1720.
- Origines gentium antiquissimae: Attempts for discovering the Times of the First Planting of Nations: in several Tracts. London. 1724.

== Authorities ==
- John Maxwell (translator) A Treatise of the Laws of Nature (London, 1727), and John Towers (Dublin, 1750); French translation by Jean Barbeyrac (Amsterdam, 1744)
- James Tyrrell (1642–1718), grandson of Archbishop Ussher, published an abridgment of Cumberland's views in A Brief Disquisition of the Laws of Nature according to the Principles laid down in the Rev. Dr Cumberland's Latin Treatise (London, 1692; ed. 1701)

For biographical details see:

- Squier Payne, Account of the Life and Writings of R. Cumberland (London, 1720); Cumberland's Memoirs (1807), i. 3–6
- Pepys's Diary

For his philosophy, see:

- F. E. Spaulding, R. Cumberland als Begründer der englischen Ethik (Leipzig, 1894)
- Ernest Albee, Philosophical Review, iv: 3 (1895), pp. 264 and 371
- Albee, Ernest (1902). "1/2". A History of English Utilitarianism.
- Kirk, Linda (1987). Richard Cumberland and Natural Law. Cambridge, James Clark.
- Stephen Darwall, The British Moralists and the Internal 'Ought' (1995), Chapter 4
- Jon Parkin, Science, Religion and Politics in Restoration England: Richard Cumberland's De Legibus Naturae (1999)

Church of England titles
| Preceded by Thomas White | Bishop of Peterborough; 1691–1718 | Succeeded by White Kennett |
