= Richard Tillesley =

Richard Tillesley (1582–1624) was an English churchman, known for his book defending tithes.

== Life ==
Born at Coventry, he was the son of Thomas Tillesley of Eccleshall in Staffordshire, by his wife, the daughter of Richard Barker of Shropshire. Matriculating at Balliol College, Oxford, on 20 January 1598, Richard was elected a scholar of St John's College on 5 July 1603. He graduated M.A. on 26 June 1607, B.D. on 22 November 1613, and D.D. on 7 July 1617.

On 25 November 1613 he was licensed to preach, and in that and the following year he received the Kentish rectories of Stone and Cuxton from John Buckeridge, Bishop of Rochester and former President of St John's College. On 9 April 1614 he was installed archdeacon of Rochester. Tillesley was buried in the choir of Rochester Cathedral, leaving a son John.

== Works ==
In 1619 Tillesley published Animadversions upon Mr. Selden's "History of Tithes," London. It is stated by Anthony à Wood that he was one of three who undertook to answer John Selden's book: he and Richard Montagu were to dealing with the legal part, and Stephen Nettles with the rabbinical aspect. Like Montagu in his Diatribe upon the first part of the late "History of Tithes," Tillesley discussed the historical aspect of the controversy in depth. Passing over the question of Jewish tithes, which had already been dealt with by Sir James Sempill, he traced their history from the apostolic period, and endeavoured to show that they had been continuously and universally enjoined by divine law. He also attempted to confute Selden's distinction between 'divine natural law' and 'ecclesiastical or positive law,' but showed little appreciation of his adversary's position. A second edition of the work was published in 1621, and contained an additional essay on some philological passages in Selden's book. A reply to Tillesley by Selden is to be found in David Wilkins's edition of Selden's works, 1726.
