= John Selden =

English jurist (1584–1654)

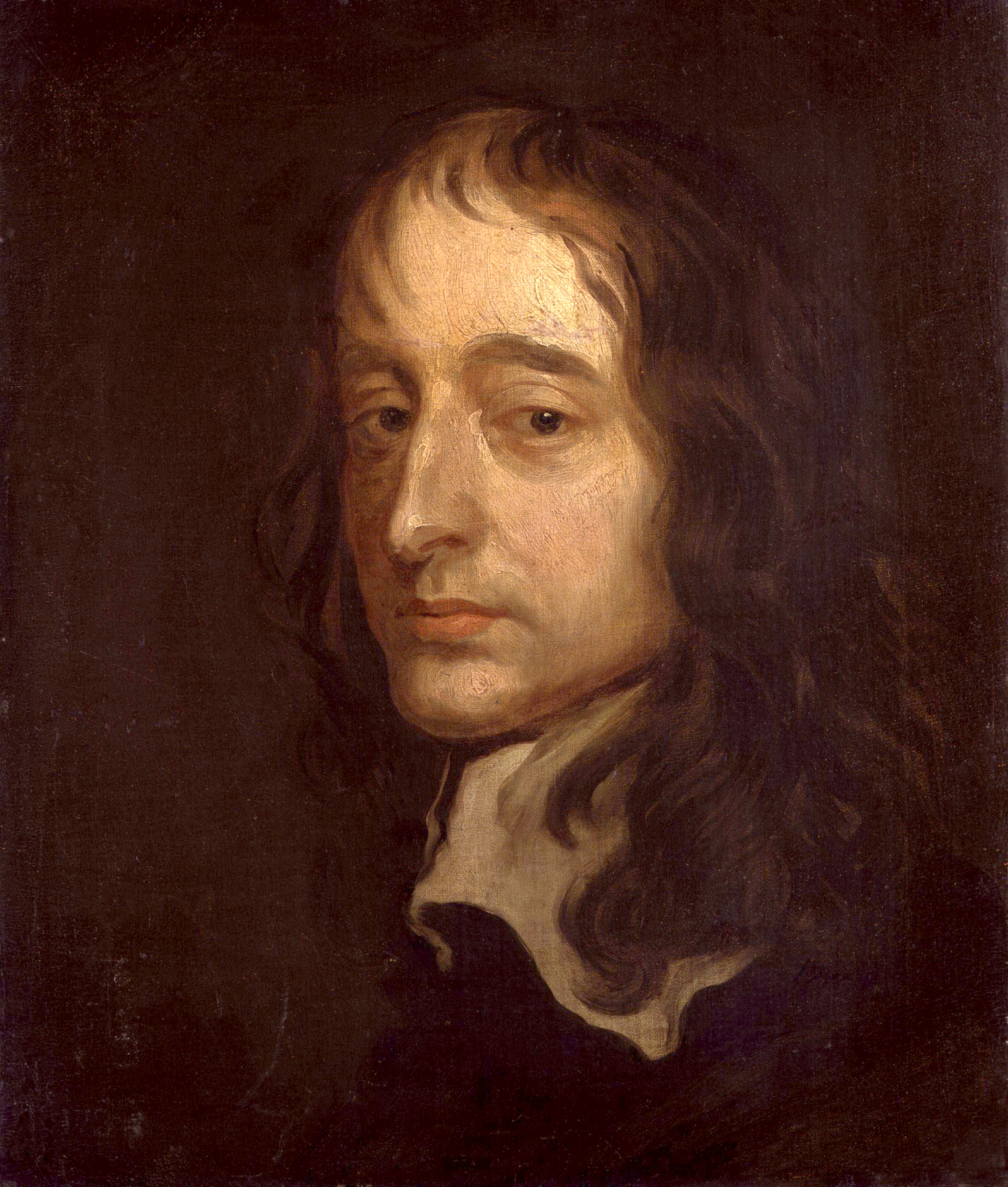
- John Selden (portrait by an unknown artist)
- Born: 16 December 1584; Salvington, Sussex
- Died: 30 November 1654 (aged 69); White Friars, London

Education
- Education: Hart Hall, Oxford

Philosophical work
- Era: 17th-century philosophy
- Region: Western philosophy
- School: Natural law, social contract, humanism
- Main interests: Political philosophy, legal history
- Notable ideas: Proposed an egoistic theory of moral motivation, maintained that natural law was revealed historically through (esp. Hebrew) scripture, argued that civil law arises from contract

John Selden (16 December 1584 – 30 November 1654) was an English jurist, a scholar of England's ancient laws and constitution and scholar of Jewish law. He was known as a polymath; John Milton hailed Selden in 1644 as "the chief of learned men reputed in this land".

== Early life ==
He was born at Salvington, in the parish of West Tarring, West Sussex (now part of the town of Worthing), and was baptised at St Andrew's, the parish church. The cottage in which he was born survived until 1959 when it was destroyed by a fire caused by an electrical fault.

His father, also named John Selden, had a small farm. It is said that his skill as a violin-player was what attracted his wife, Margaret, who was from a better family, being the only child of Thomas Baker of Rustington and descended from a knightly family of Kent. Selden was educated at the free grammar school at Chichester, The Prebendal School, and in 1600 he went on to Hart Hall, Oxford. In 1603, he was admitted to Clifford's Inn, London; in 1604 he moved to the Inner Temple; and in 1612 he was called to the bar. His earliest patron was Sir Robert Bruce Cotton, the antiquary, who seems to have employed him to copy and summarise some of the parliamentary records then held at the Tower of London. For some reason, Selden very rarely practised in court, but his practice in barristers' chambers as a conveyancer and consulting counsel was large and apparently lucrative.

== Legal scholar into politics ==
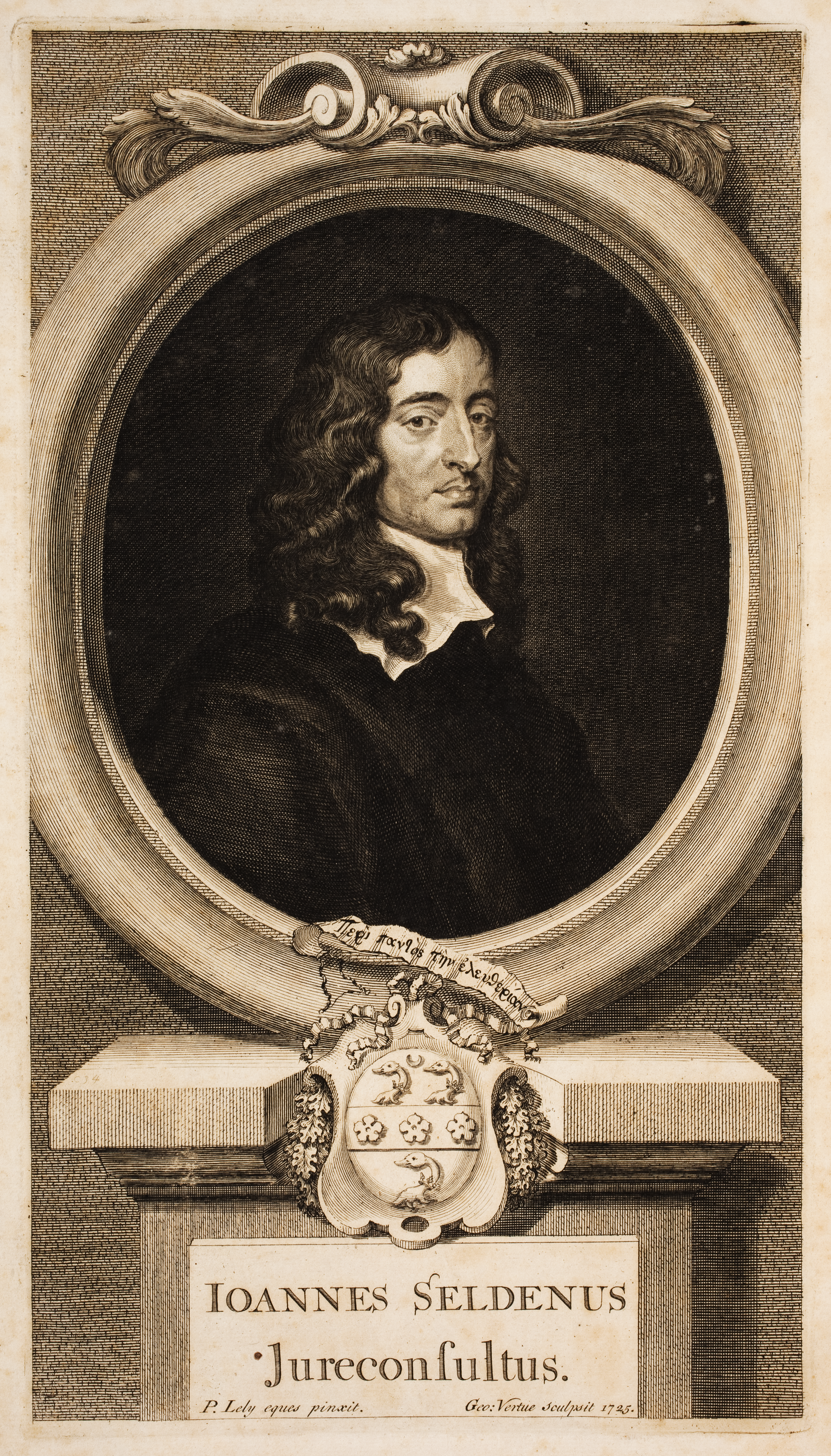
Portrait of Selden (drawn by Peter Lely; engraved by George Vertue) included in the 1726 edition of his works

In 1618, his History of Tithes appeared. Although it had passed censorship and licensing, this dissertation on the historical basis of the tithe system caused anxiety among the bishops and provoked the intervention of the king, James I. The author was summoned before the Privy Council and was compelled to retract his opinions. Also, his work was suppressed, and he was forbidden to reply to anyone who might come forward to answer it.

This all seems to have caused Selden's entry into politics. Although he was not in the Parliament of England, he was the instigator and perhaps the draughtsman of the Protestation of 1621 on the rights and privileges of the House, affirmed by the House of Commons on 18 December 1621. He and several others were imprisoned, at first in the Tower and later under the charge of Sir Robert Ducie, sheriff of London. During his brief detention, he occupied himself in preparing an edition of medieval historian Eadmer's History from a manuscript lent to him by his host or jailor, which he published two years afterwards.

== Parliamentarian ==
In 1623 he was returned to the House of Commons for the borough of Lancaster, and sat with John Coke, William Noy, and John Pym on Sergeant Glanville's election committee. He was also nominated reader of Lyon's Inn, an office he declined to undertake. For this the benchers of the Inner Temple fined him £20 and disqualified him from being one of their number. Nevertheless, after a few years, he became a master of the bench. In the first parliament of Charles I (1625), it appears from the "returns of members" printed in 1878 that contrary to the assertion of all his biographers, he had no seat. In Charles's second parliament (1626), he was elected for Great Bedwyn in Wiltshire, and took a prominent part in the impeachment of George Villiers, 1st Duke of Buckingham. In the following year, in Darnell's Case (the Five Knights' Case), he was counsel for Sir Edmund Hampden in the Court of King's Bench.

In 1628 he was returned to the third parliament of Charles for Ludgershall, Wiltshire, and was involved in drawing up and carrying the Petition of Right. In the session of 1629 he was one of the members responsible for the tumultuous passage in the House of Commons of the resolution against the illegal levy of tonnage and poundage, and, along with Sir John Eliot, Denzil Holles, Long, Valentine, William Strode, and the rest, he was sent back to the Tower. There he remained for eight months, deprived for a part of the time of the use of books and writing materials. He was then removed, under less rigorous conditions, to the Marshalsea, until Archbishop Laud arranged for him to be freed. Some years before, he had been appointed steward to Henry Grey, 8th Earl of Kent, to whose seat, Wrest in Bedfordshire, he now retired.

He was not elected to the Short Parliament of 1640; but to the Long Parliament, summoned in the autumn, he was returned without opposition for Oxford University. He opposed the resolution against episcopacy which led to the exclusion of the bishops from the House of Lords, and printed an answer to the arguments used by Sir Harbottle Grimston on that occasion. He joined in the protestation of the Commons for the maintenance of the Protestant religion according to the doctrines of the Church of England, the authority of the Crown, and the liberty of the subject. He was equally opposed to the court on the question of the commissions of lieutenancy of array and to the parliament on the question of the militia ordinance. In the end, he supported Parliament against King Charles, because, according to him, Charles was certainly acting illegally; but Selden was not certain if Parliament was doing the same.

In 1643 he participated in the discussions of the Westminster Assembly, where his Erastian views were opposed by George Gillespie. Selden's allies included Thomas Coleman, John Lightfoot, and Bulstrode Whitelocke.

In October 1643 Selden was appointed by Commons to take control of the office of Clerk and Keeper of the Records in the Tower, which duty passed to the Master of the Rolls in 1651. In 1645, he was named one of the parliamentary commissioners of the admiralty and was elected master of Trinity Hall, Cambridge, an office that he declined to accept. In 1646, he subscribed to the Solemn League and Covenant and, in 1647, was voted £5000 (£814,000 in 2025) by the parliament as compensation for his pains under the monarchy.

== Last years ==
After the death of the Earl of Kent in 1639, Selden lived permanently under the same roof with the earl's widow, the former Elizabeth Talbot. It is believed that he married her, although their marriage does not seem to have ever been publicly acknowledged. He assembled a famous library which eventually became part of the Bodleian Library's collection in 1659. In addition to a wide range of Greek, Arabic, Hebrew and Latin works, it included the Codex Mendoza and the Selden Map of China. He died at Friary House in Whitefriars, London on 30 November 1654, and was buried in the Temple Church, London. His tomb is today clearly visible through glass plates in the floor of this church. Furthermore, he is commemorated by a monumental inscription on the south side of the Temple Church. More than two centuries after his death, in 1880, a brass tablet was erected to his memory by the benchers of the Inner Temple in the parish church of St. Andrew's, West Tarring.

== Works ==
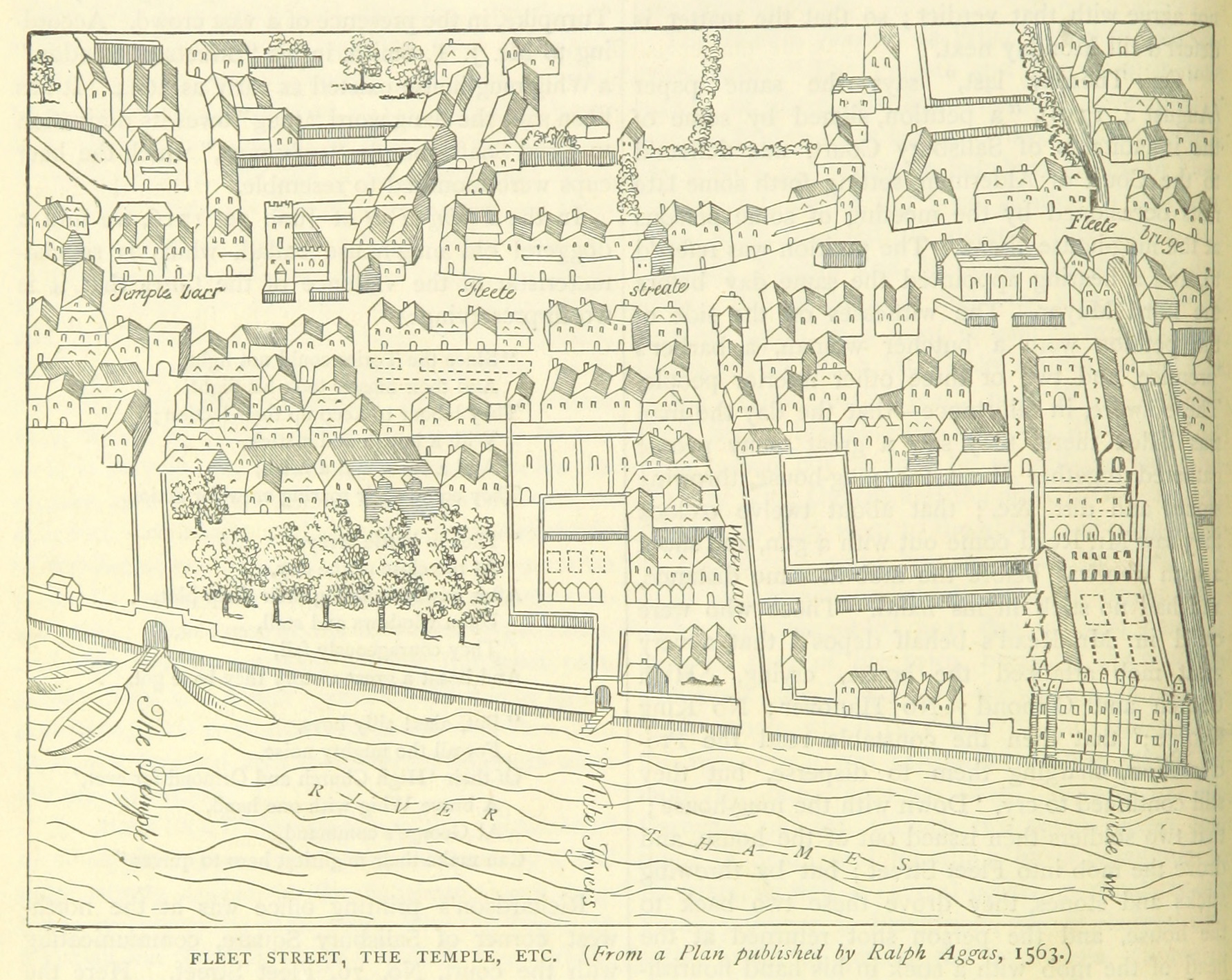
Plan of the Temple as Selden would have known it, based on the "Woodcut map of London" of the early 1560s

1899 edition of Selden's Table Talk by Robert Waters (1835–1910)

It was as a prolific scholar and writer that Selden won his reputation. The early books were on English history.

=== English history and antiquities ===
In 1610 three of his works came out: Jani Anglorum Facies Altera (The Back Face [or Two Faces] of the English Janus) and England's Epinomis, which dealt with the progress of English law down to Henry II; and The Duello, or Single Combat, in which he traced the history of trial by battle in England from the Norman Conquest. In 1613 he supplied a series of notes, including quotations and references, to the first eighteen cantos of Michael Drayton's Poly-Olbion. In 1614 he published Titles of Honor, which, in spite of defects and omissions, remained a comprehensive work for centuries. It was republished in a larger and greatly revised edition in 1631, and in a third edition in 1672. It earned for Selden the praise "monarch of letters" from his friend Ben Jonson.

In 1615, the Analecton Anglobritannicon, an account of the civil administration of England before the Norman Conquest, written in 1607, was published; its title and argument imitated the Franco-Gallia of François Hotman. In 1616 appeared notes on John Fortescue's De laudibus legum Angliae and Ralph de Hengham's Summae magna et parva.

In 1618 his controversial History of Tithes was published. A first sign of the coming storm was the 1619 book controverting Selden, Sacrilege Sacredly Handled in two parts; with an Appendix, answering some objections by James Sempill. Selden hit back, but was soon gagged. The churchmen Richard Tillesley (1582–1621) (Animadversions upon M. Seldens History of Tithes, 1619) and Richard Montagu (Diatribae upon the first part of the late History of Tithes, 1621) attacked the work. There were further replies by William Sclater (The Quaestion of Tythes Revised, 1623), and by Stephen Nettles (Answer to the Jewish Part of Mr. Selden's History of Tithes 1625). In it Selden tried to demonstrate that tithing depended on the civil law, rather than canon law. He also made much of the complexities of the ancient Jewish customs on tithes. The work was also a milestone in the history of English historical writing through its mixture of antiquarian-philological scholarship with historical narrative, two approaches to the study of the past previously seen as distinct.

In 1623 he produced an edition of Eadmer's Historia Novarum. It was notable for including in appendices information from the Domesday Book, which at the time had not been published and could only be consulted in the original at Westminster, on the payment of a fee.

He published in 1642 Privileges of the Baronage of England when they sit in Parliament and Discourse concerning the Rights and Privileges of the Subject. In 1652 he wrote a preface and collated some of the manuscripts for Sir Roger Twysden's Historiae Anglicanae scriptores X.

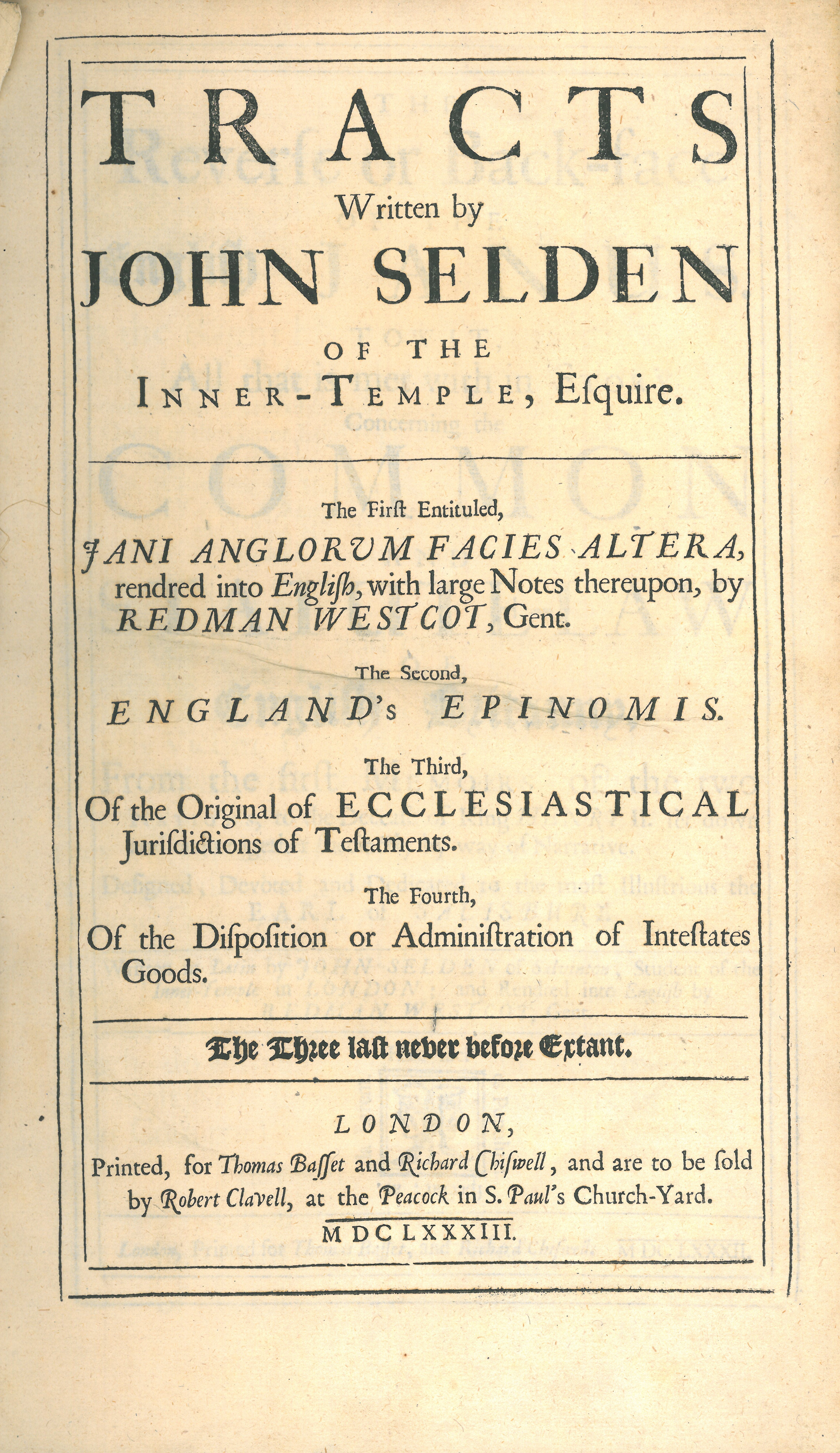
Tracts, published posthumously in 1683, contained English translations

=== Literature and archaeology of the Near East ===
In 1617, his De dis Syris was issued, and immediately established his fame as an orientalist. It is remarkable for its early use of the comparative method, on Semitic mythology. Also, in 1642, he published a part of the Arabic chronicle of Patriarch Eutychius of Alexandria, under the title Eutychii Aegyptii, Patriarchae Orthodoxorum Alexandrini, ... ecclesiae suae origines. Controversial was the discussion in it of the absence in Alexandria of the distinction between priests and bishops, a burning issue in the debate at the time in the Church of England.

In 1628, at the suggestion of Sir Robert Cotton, Selden compiled, with the assistance of two other scholars, Patrick Young and Richard James, a catalogue of the Arundel marbles.

=== Studies on Judaism ===
He employed his leisure at Wrest in writing De successionibus in bona defuncti secundum leges Ebraeorum and De successione in pontificatum Ebraeorum, published in 1631.

During the progress of the constitutional conflict, he was absorbed in research, publishing De jure naturali et gentium juxta disciplinam Ebraeorum in 1640. It was a contribution to the theorising of the period on natural law. In the words of John Milton, this "volume of naturall & national laws proves, not only by great authorities brought together, but by exquisite reasons and theorems almost mathematically demonstrative, that all opinions, yea errors, known, read, and collated, are of main service & assistance toward the speedy attainment of what is truest." It develops into a theory of international law, taking as its basis the Seven Laws of Noah.

In 1644, he published Dissertatio de anno civili et calendario reipublicae Judaicae, in 1646 his treatise on marriage and divorce among the Jews entitled Uxor Ebraica, and in 1647 the earliest printed edition of the old English law-book Fleta. In 1650 Selden began to print the trilogy he planned on the Sanhedrin, as the first part of De synedriis et prefecturis juridicis veterum Ebraeorum through the press, the second and third parts being severally published in 1653 and 1655. The aim of this work was to counter the use by the Presbyterians, in particular, of arguments and precedents drawn from Jewish tradition; it was a very detailed study aimed at refuting such arguments, and pointing out the inherent flexibility of the tradition that was being cited.

=== International law ===
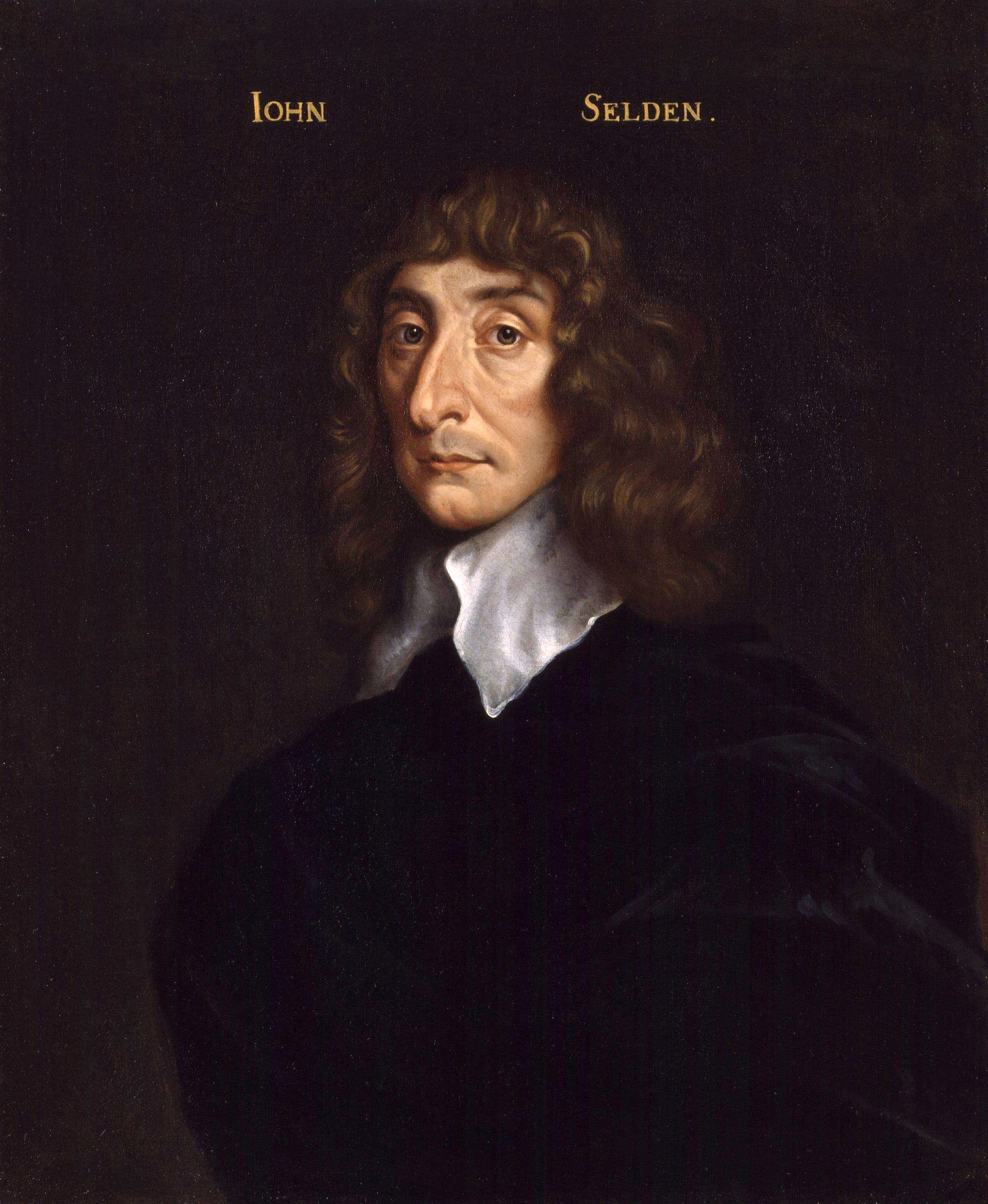
A portrait of John Selden held by the National Portrait Gallery, London

His Mare clausum was written to dismantle the pretensions advanced by Grotius in The Free Sea (Mare liberum), on behalf of the Dutch fishermen, to poach in the waters off the English coasts.

The circumstances of its delayed publication, in 1635, suggest that during the early 1630s Selden inclined towards the court rather than the popular party and even secured the personal favour of the king, Charles I. It had been written sixteen or seventeen years earlier, but for political reasons Charles's predecessor, James I, had prohibited its publication. When it eventually appeared, a quarter of a century after Mare liberum, it was under Charles's royal patronage, as a kind of state paper, and with a dedication to him. The fact that Selden was not retained in the great case of ship money in 1637 by John Hampden, the cousin of Sir Edmund, his former client in the Five Knights' Case, may be taken as additional evidence that his zeal for the popular cause was neither so warm nor so unquestioned as it had once been.

His last publication was a vindication of himself from certain charges advanced against him and his Mare clausum around 1653 by Theodore Graswinckel, a Dutch jurist.

=== Posthumous publications ===
Several of Selden's minor works were printed for the first time after his death, including a tract in defence of the 25 December birth of Christ written during the Puritan Commonwealth (1649–1660) when celebration of Christmas was prohibited. A collective edition of his writings was published by David Wilkins in 3 volumes folio in 1725, and again in 1726. Table Talk, for which he is perhaps best known, did not appear until 1689. It was edited by his amanuensis, Richard Milward, who affirms that "the sense and notion is wholly Selden's" and that "most of the words" are his also. Its genuineness has sometimes been questioned.

== Views ==
Selden arrived at an Erastian position in church politics. He also believed in free will, which was inconsistent with Calvinism.

He was sceptical of the legend of King Arthur as it had grown up, but believed Arthur had existed. The Druids, he suggested in comments on Poly-Olbion, were ancient and presumed esoteric thinkers. The popular image of a Druid descends via a masque of Inigo Jones from a reconstruction by Selden, based (without good foundations) on ancient German statuary.

== Commemoration ==
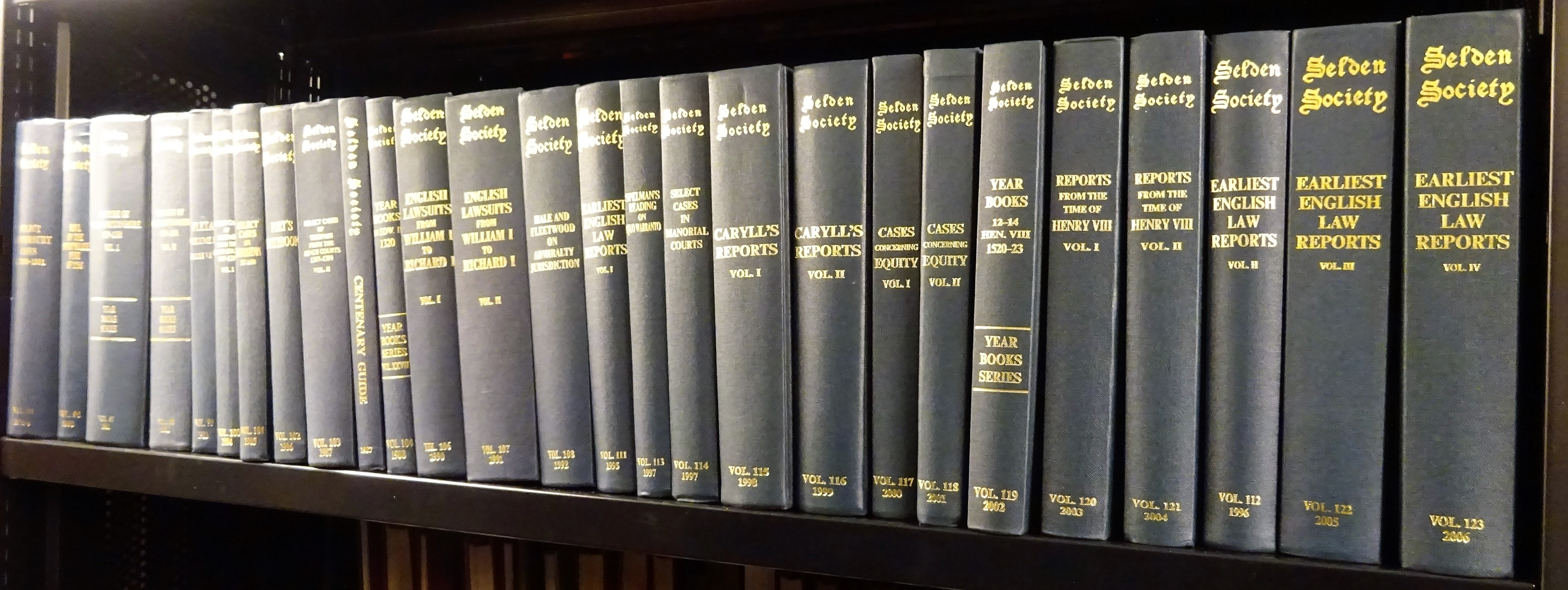
Volumes published by the Selden Society

Selden is commemorated in the name of the Selden Society, a learned society concerned with the study of English legal history, founded in 1887.

He is commemorated in place-names in Salvington, including "The John Selden Inn", which purports to be on the site of his dwelling; Selden Road; and the Selden medical centre. The Selden Arms on Lyndhurst Road in Worthing is named after him.

He is also commemorated in the name of Selden College, a classical Christian liberal arts university in Oxford, founded in 2025.

== Influence ==
According to the Encyclopedia of Historians and Historical Writing, he "played a role of fundamental importance in the transition of English historical writing from a medieval antiquarianism to a more modern understanding of the scope and function of history than had ever before been expressed in Renaissance England". His reputation lasted well, with Mark Pattison calling him "the most learned man, not only of his party, but of Englishmen".

By about 1640, Selden's views (with those of Grotius) had a large impact on the Great Tew circle around Lucius Cary, 2nd Viscount Falkland: William Chillingworth, Dudley Digges, Henry Hammond. It was in this milieu that Selden met and befriended Thomas Hobbes. They had much in common, in political thought, but the precise connections have not been clarified.

Richard Cumberland followed Selden over both Grotius and Hobbes on natural law. Selden contested the scholastic position, after Cicero, that "right reason" could by its dictates alone generate obligation, by claiming that a formal obligation required a superior in authority. In his De legibus Cumberland rejects Selden's solution by means of the Noahide laws, in De jure naturali, in favour of Selden's less developed alternate solution. The latter is more orthodox for a Thomist, an intellectus agens as a natural faculty in the rational soul, by the mediation of which divine intellect can intervene directly with individuals. Matthew Hale tried to merge the theory of Grotius on property with Selden's view on obligation. Cumberland and Hale both belonged to a larger group, followers in a broad sense of Selden, with backgrounds mostly of Cambridge and the law, comprising also Orlando Bridgeman, Hezekiah Burton, John Hollings, Richard Kidder, Edward Stillingfleet, John Tillotson, and John Wilkins.

Giambattista Vico called Grotius, Selden and Samuel Pufendorf the "three princes" of the "natural right of the gentes". He went on to criticise their approach foundationally. In his Autobiography he specifies that they had conflated the natural law of the "nations", based on custom, with that of the philosophers, based on human abstractions. Isaiah Berlin comments on Vico's admiration for Grotius and Selden.

== Library collections ==
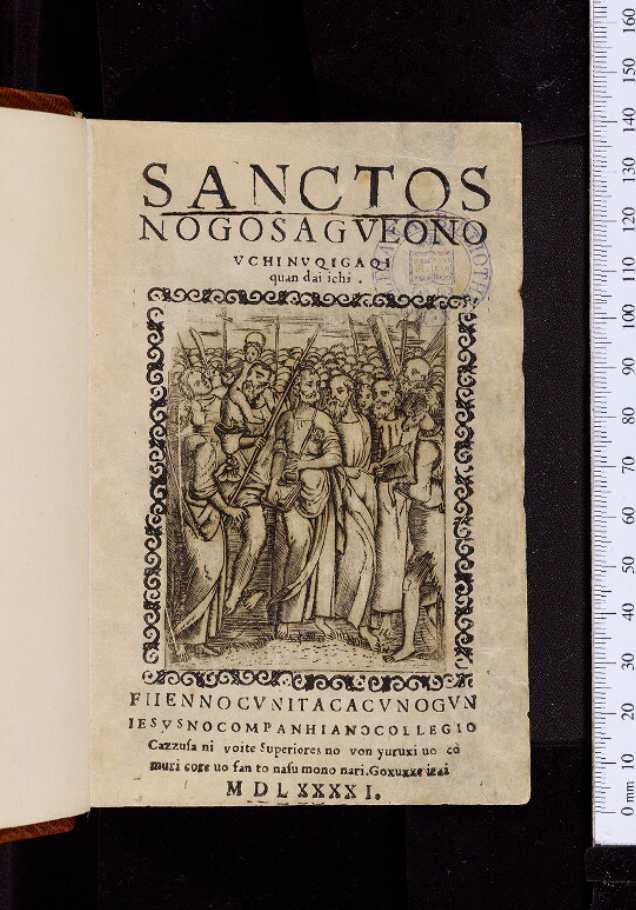
Title page for John Selden's copy of Sanctos no gosagues no uchi nuqigaqi quan dai ichi (1591). This was the first book printed with moveable type in Japan. Oxford, Bodleian Library Arch. B f.69: https://digital.bodleian.ox.ac.uk/objects/3bdc1c46-9c84-4e64-aa83-b48b4baf2a5f//

By the time of his death in 1654, Selden had accumulated a library of several thousand manuscripts and printed books. Selden's will left his intentions for this library somewhat ambiguous, although the will and codicil seem to suggest that he intended to bequeath most of his Oriental manuscripts, Greek manuscripts, a Latin manuscript, and his printed Talmudic and Rabbinical books to the Bodleian Library, Oxford. There is some evidence to suggest that Selden intended to leave his printed books and historical manuscripts to the Inner Temple but that this transaction did not occur because the Temple did not possess a large enough library. By 1656, two years after Selden's death, his executors (Edward Heyward, John Vaughan, Matthew Hale, and Rowland Jewks) were in negotiation with the Bodleian library to transfer Selden's entire collection. In 1659, the executors stipulated that Selden's manuscripts "bee forever heerafter kepte together in one distincte pile and body under the name of Mr. Selden's Library." The Bodleian agreed, and the library received Selden's collection in June 1659.

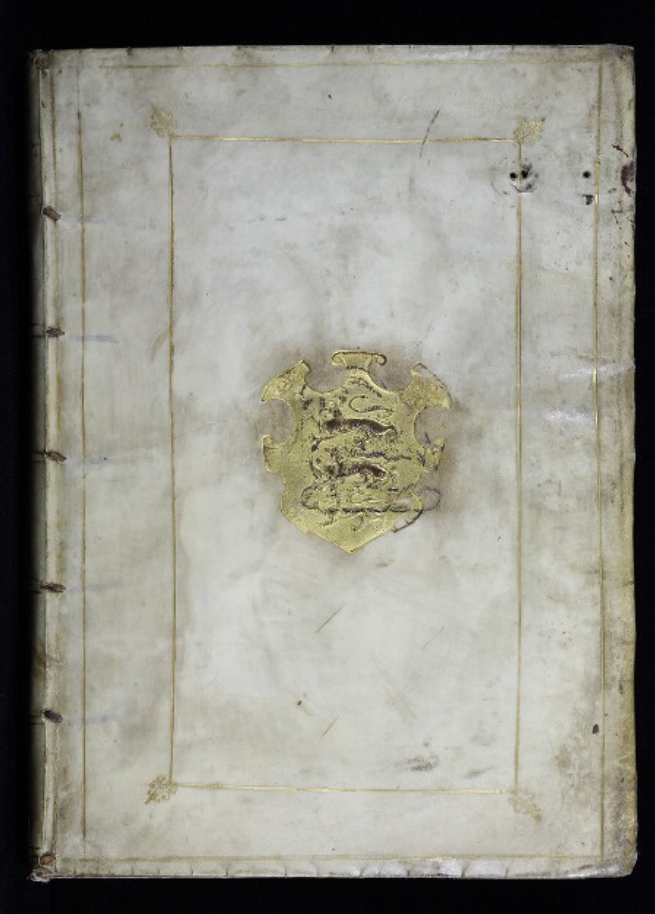
Cover of John Selden's copy of Boccaccio's Decamerone. The design on the cover is similar to the Plantagenet arms. Holes from clasps are also visible. Oxford, Bodleian Library S. Seld. c.2: https://digital.bodleian.ox.ac.uk/objects/61459688-0512-49e0-a996-a4f0921956b2/

Selden's collection was the largest received by the Bodleian in the seventeenth century, comprising around 8,000 items. Even this massive collection did not represent the extent of Selden's library. Duplicates, meaning books the library already owned, were given to Gloucester Cathedral library. A rumour also circulated in the decades after Selden's death that part of his library had remained in London and was destroyed by a fire. The 1704 edition of Edward Chamberlayne's The Present State of England claimed that a fire at the Inner Temple destroyed "8 Chests full" of Selden's manuscripts. Still, the collection the Bodleian received was large enough that it required several years and multiple librarians to fully catalogue. Since then, the original collection has been enhanced by further acquisitions, most notably by a group of forty Selden manuscripts purchased by the Bodleian from James Fairhurst in 1947. The Selden collection at the Bodleian houses more than 400 manuscript volumes taking up more than 40 meters (approx. 130 feet) of shelf space. The linguistic range of these manuscripts reflects Selden's interest in eastern and other languages. The languages represented include

- Russian
  - An incomplete Russian-English vocabulary (MS. Selden Supra 61)
  - Samples of Russian calligraphy (MS. Arch. Selden A. 72 (5))
- Greek
  - Astronomical and musical treatises (MS. Arch. Selden B. 17)
  - Several Greek versions of the New Testament Gospels (MS. Selden Supra 2, 3, 6, 28–9)
- Arabic
  - Prayers, meditations, and Quranic praises (MS. Selden Superius 3)
  - Works on astrology and medicine (MS. Selden Superius 15)
  - Works on Algebra and mathematics (MS. Selden Superius 65)
- Hebrew
  - Hebrew and Arabic grammar and vocabulary (MS. Selden Supra 107)
  - Kabbalah and Kabbalistic collections (MS. Arch. Selden A. 56; MS. Selden Superius 107)
- New World languages
  - A treatise on Mexican hieroglyphics (MS. Arch. Selden A. 2)

Many manuscripts relate to Selden's study of the law both in England and internationally. These include

- A fragment on Islamic law (MS. Selden Superius 42)
- Canon law (MS. Arch. Selden A. 63)
- An account of the laws of Ivan the Terrible (MS. Selden Supra. 59)
- Various legal topics, such as maritime law and a Latin treatise on procedure in Civil Courts (MS. Arch. Selden B. 27)

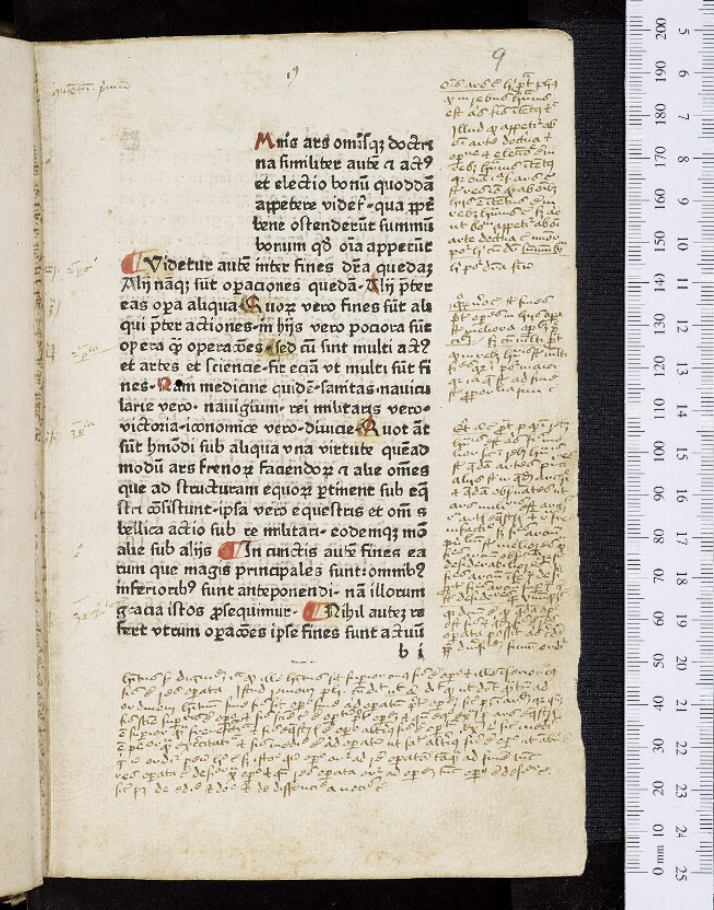
A heavily annotated page in John Selden's copy of Aristotle's Nicomachean Ethics, translated by Leonardus Brunus Aretinus (1479). The page includes a space left for an initial (also called a drop cap). Oxford, Bodleian Library S. Seld. e.2: https://digital.bodleian.ox.ac.uk/objects/032cc92a-b24c-48ab-9c58-3545cf24121f/.

Some manuscripts touch on contemporary events. For instance MS. Arch. Selden B. 8 includes a Latin speech given in Oxford on the return of Prince Charles from Spain in 1623. Still others contain classical works of philosophy and literature, such as

- Treatises of Aristotle (MS. Selden Supra 24)
- Aeschylus and Lycophron (MS. Selden Supra 18)

Beyond manuscripts, the Selden collection contains several notable printed works. Among them is the first book ever printed in Japan using moveable type, Sanctos no gosagueo no uchi nuqigaqi (Arch.b.f.69). The printed books included in the Selden collection contain many that are significant in part because they originated in the libraries of other famous figures, including Sir Robert Cotton, John Donne, and John Dee. According to Geoffrey Keynes, several of the books Selden received from John Donne's library include inscriptions from both men. One such book is Theodorus Beza's Tractatio de polygamia, which includes Donne's signature and motto ("Per Rachel ho servitor, & non per Lea"), as well as Selden's motto ("περί παντός τήν έλευθερίαν", "Freedom above all things").
