= Listed buildings in Sutton, Kent =

Civil Parish in Kent, England

Sutton is a village and civil parish in the Dover District of Kent, England. It contains 20 listed buildings that are recorded in the National Heritage List for England. Of these two are grade II* and 18 are grade II.

This list is based on the information retrieved online from Historic England.

== Key ==
Grade	Criteria
I	Buildings that are of exceptional interest
II*	Particularly important buildings of more than special interest
II	Buildings that are of special interest

== Listing ==
Name	Grade	Location	Type	Completed (Note: The date given is the date used by Historic England as significant for the initial building or that of an important part in the structure's description.)	Date designated	Grid ref. (Note: The grid reference is based on the British national grid reference system, sometimes known as OSGB36, used by the Ordnance Survey.) Geo-coordinates	Notes	Entry number (Note: The "List Entry Number" is a unique number assigned to each listed building and scheduled monument by Historic England.)	Image	Wikidata
Barn About 30 Metres North East of Maydensole Farmhouse	II				24 March 1987	TR3152847641; 51°10′52″N 1°18′41″E		1237027	Upload Photo	Q26530214
Maydensole Farmhouse	II*		farmhouse		11 October 1963	TR3149047616; 51°10′51″N 1°18′39″E		1237618	Maydensole Farmhouse More images	Q17557786
Church House	II	Church Hill			24 March 1987	TR3349449309; 51°11′43″N 1°20′26″E		1264298	Upload Photo	Q26555007
Church of St Peter and St Paul	II*	Church Hill	church building		11 October 1963	TR3343249340; 51°11′44″N 1°20′23″E		1247673	Church of St Peter and St Paul More images	Q17557790
Flintstone Cottage	II	Church Hill			24 March 1987	TR3344149317; 51°11′43″N 1°20′23″E		1263995	Upload Photo	Q26554739
Headstone to John Andjoyce Dilnot About 4 Metres East of Church of St Peter and St Paul	II	Church Hill			24 March 1987	TR3345249339; 51°11′44″N 1°20′24″E		1237029	Upload Photo	Q26530216
Headstone to John Garnett About 2 Metres North of Church of St Peter and St Paul	II	Church Hill			24 March 1987	TR3344449344; 51°11′44″N 1°20′23″E		1237030	Upload Photo	Q26530217
Sutton Court	II	Church Hill			24 March 1987	TR3341749404; 51°11′46″N 1°20′22″E		1237028	Upload Photo	Q26530215
The Boot	II	Church Hill			13 October 1952	TR3346249362; 51°11′45″N 1°20′24″E		1237031	Upload Photo	Q26530218
Tomb Chest and Headstone to Marsh Family About 1 Metre North of Church of St Peter and St Paul	II	Church Hill			24 March 1987	TR3343749345; 51°11′44″N 1°20′23″E		1247688	Upload Photo	Q26539976
Upper Farm	II	Church Hill, Upper Farm			24 March 1987	TR3333349411; 51°11′46″N 1°20′18″E		1247666	Upload Photo	Q26539956
Little Mongeham House	II	Little Mongeham			24 March 1987	TR3320850891; 51°12′34″N 1°20′15″E		1247702	Upload Photo	Q26539988
Manor Farmhouse	II	Little Mongeham			24 March 1987	TR3338250984; 51°12′37″N 1°20′24″E		1247705	Upload Photo	Q26539991
Outbuilding About 15 Metres East of Little Mongeham House	II	Little Mongeham			24 March 1987	TR3323650892; 51°12′34″N 1°20′16″E		1264299	Upload Photo	Q26555008
Great Napchester Farmhouse	II	Napchester Road			11 October 1963	TR3108947338; 51°10′43″N 1°18′18″E		1237032	Upload Photo	Q26530219
St Margarets Farmhouse	II	Napchester Road			24 March 1987	TR3101046950; 51°10′30″N 1°18′13″E		1247709	Upload Photo	Q26539995
Stoneheap Farmhouse	II	Stoneheap			24 March 1987	TR3215750771; 51°12′32″N 1°19′21″E		1264212	Upload Photo	Q26554936
Parsonage Farmhouse	II	Vale Road			11 October 1963	TR3359249406; 51°11′46″N 1°20′31″E		1263965	Upload Photo	Q26554710
The Yews	II	Vale Road			24 March 1987	TR3357749180; 51°11′39″N 1°20′30″E		1247711	Upload Photo	Q26539996
Barn at Wingleton Farm (TR 3412 4935)	II	Wingleton Farm			24 March 1987	TR3412049350; 51°11′43″N 1°20′58″E		1264297	Upload Photo	Q26555006

== See also ==
- Grade I listed buildings in Kent
- Grade II* listed buildings in Kent

== Sources ==
- Newman, John (2013) [1969], Kent: North-East and East, The Buildings of England, New Haven and London: Yale University Press, ISBN 978-0-300-18506-5
