= George Gillespie =

Scottish minister (1613-1648)

The Reverend George Gillespie
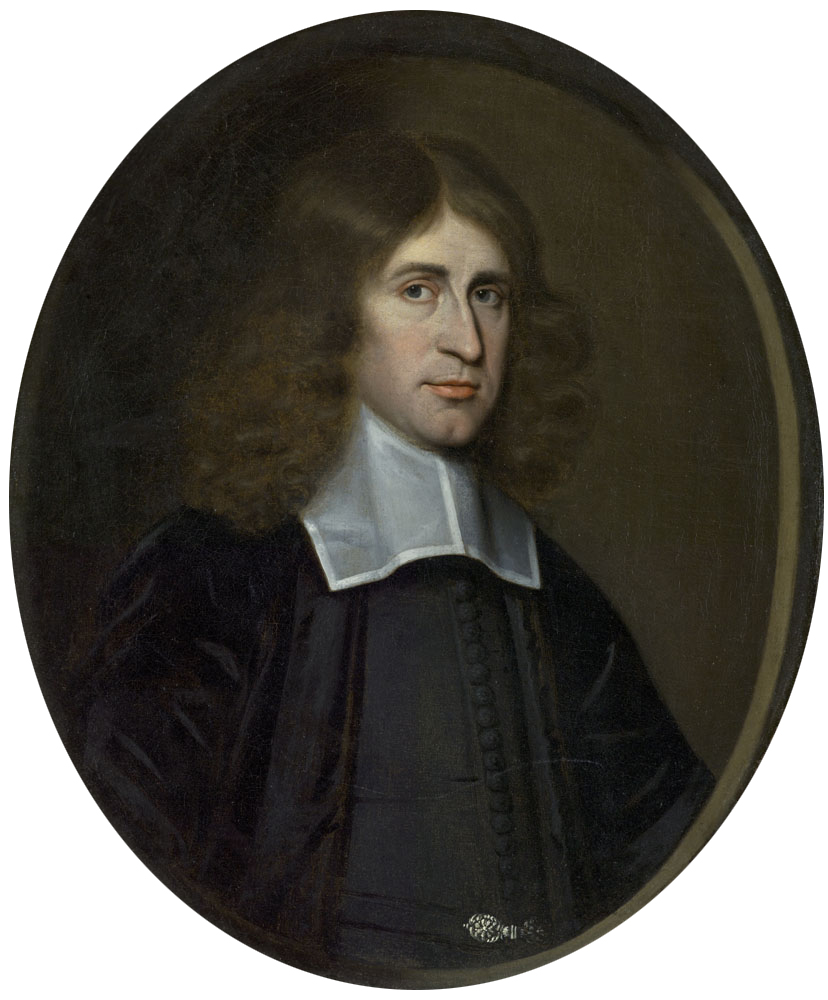
- Born: 21 January 1613; Kirkcaldy, Scotland
- Died: 17 December 1648 (aged 35); Kirkcaldy, Scotland
- Education: University of St Andrews
- Spouse: Margaret Murray
- Children: 4

George Gillespie (/ɡɪˈlɛspi/ ghih-LES-pee; 21 January 1613 – 17 December 1648) was a Scottish theologian.

== Family ==
He married Margaret Murray, who had £1000 sterling voted by Parliament immediately after his death, for the support of herself and family, but, owing to the distractions of the time, it was never paid. His children were:

- Robert Gillespie, baptised 15 May 1643 (who received ordination from the "outed" ministers. Robert was imprisoned in the Bass for preaching at conventicles (1673). Robert subsequently went to England, and died, his widow and children being recommended by Parliament to the royal bounty, 17 July 1695
- George, baptised 20 May 1644
- Archibald, died in 1659
- Elizabeth (married James Oswald, merchant in Edinburgh, afterwards of Fingleton).

== Life ==
Gillespie was born at Kirkcaldy, where his father, John Gillespie, was parish minister. His sister was the Quaker writer, prophet and preacher Lilias Skene. He studied at St. Andrews University as a "presbytery bursar". On graduating he became domestic chaplain to John Gordon, 1st Viscount Kenmure (d. 1634), and afterwards to John Kennedy, 6th Earl of Cassilis. His conscience did not permit him to accept the episcopal ordination, which was at that time an indispensable condition of induction to a parish in Scotland.

In April 1638, soon after the authority of the bishops had been abolished by the nation in Scotland, Gillespie was ordained minister of Wemyss (Fife) by the presbytery of Kirkcaldy. In the same year he was a member of the Glasgow Assembly, before which he preached a sermon, on 21 November, against royal interference in matters ecclesiastical. It was so pronounced as to call for some remonstrance on the part of Argyll, the Lord High Commissioner.

In 1640 he accompanied the commissioners of the peace to England as one of their chaplains. In 1642 Gillespie was translated to Edinburgh; but the remainder of his life was chiefly spent in the conduct of public business in London. From 1643 onward, he was a member of the Westminster Assembly, in which he took a prominent part: he was appointed by the Scottish Church as one of the four commissioners to the Assembly. He was the youngest member at the Assembly, but took a great part in almost all the discussions on church government, discipline, and worship. He strongly supported Presbyterianism by numerous writings, as well as by fluency and readiness in debate. One of the most notable is his well preserved encounter with John Selden on Erastianism and Presbyterian polity.

In 1645 he returned to Scotland, and is said to have drawn the Act of Assembly sanctioning the directory of public worship. On his return to London he had a hand in drafting the Westminster confession of faith, especially chapter I.

Gillespie was elected moderator of the Assembly in 1648, but the duties of that office (the court continued to sit from 12 July to 12 August) told on his health; he fell into consumption, and died in Kirkcaldy on 17 December 1648. In acknowledgment of his public services, a sum of 1000 Scots was voted, although destined never to be paid, to his widow and children by the committee of estates. A simple tombstone, which had been erected to his memory in Kirkcaldy parish church, was, in 1661, publicly broken at the cross by the hand of the common hangman, but was restored in 1746. His son, Robert, was later imprisoned at Bass Rock.

== Works ==
A man of notable intellectual power, he exercised an influence remarkable especially as he died in his 36th year. He was one of the most formidable controversialists of a highly controversial age. His best known work is Aaron's Rod Blossoming, a defense of the ecclesiastical claims of the high Presbyterian party.

While with the Earl of Cassillis he wrote his first work, A Dispute against the English Popish Ceremonies obtruded upon the Church of Scotland, which, published shortly after the "Jenny Geddes" incident (but without the author's name) in the summer of 1637, attracted considerable attention. Within a few months it had been found by the Privy Council to be so damaging that by their orders all available copies were called in and burnt.

His principal publications were controversial and chiefly against Erastianism:

- Three sermons against Thomas Coleman;
- A Sermon before the House of Lords (27 August 1645), on Matt. iii. 2, Nihil Respondem and Male Audis;
- Aaron's Rod Blossoming, or the Divine Ordinance of Church-government vindicated (1646), which is regarded as an able statement of the case for an exclusive spiritual jurisdiction in the church;
- One Hundred and Eleven Propositions concerning the Ministry and Government of the Church (Edinburgh, 1647).

The following were posthumously published by his brother:

- A Treatise of Miscellany Questions (1649);
- The Ark of the New Testament (2 vols., 1661–1667);
- Notes of Debates and Proceedings of the Assembly of Divines at Westminster, from February 1644 to January 1645.

See also Works, with memoir, published by William Maxwell Hetherington (Edinburgh, 1843–1846).

- An assertion of the government of the Church of Scotland, in the points of ruling-elders, and of the authority of presbyteries and synods : with a postscript in answer to a treatise lately published against presbyterial government .. (1641)
- An Useful Case of Conscience Discussed and Resolved: Concerning Associations and Confederacies ... (1649)
- The Works of Mr. George Gillespie (Vol. 1 of 2)
- Testimony-bearing exemplified : a collection. Containing, I. Gillepsie against association with malignants; together with the causes of God's wrath, agreed upon by the General assembly of the Church of Scotland, met at Edinburgh, October 1651. II. The informatory vindication; to which is subjoined, a collection of excellent laws, (or Eschol grapes) in favours of our covenanted reformation .. (1791)
- A Dispute against the English Popish Ceremonies obtruded upon the Church of Scotland (1637; another edition, 1844)
- An Assertion of the Church Covenant of Scotland (1641)
- Dialogue between a Civilian and a Divine, concerning the Present Condition of the Church of England (London, 1644)
- A Recrimination in Defence of Presbyterianism (London, 1644)
- Nihil Respondes (London, 1645)
- The True Resolution of a Present Controversy concerning Liberty of Conscience (London, 1645)
- Wholesome Severity reconciled, with Christian Liberty (London, 1645)
- Aaron's Rod Blossoming (London, 1646 )
- Male Audis, an Answer to Coleman's Male Dicis (London, 1646)
- A Treatise of Miscellany Questions (Edinburgh, 1649)
- A Useful Case of Conscience Discussed (Edinburgh, 1649)
- Works, with memoir by W. M. Hetherington, LL.D., 2 vols. (Edinburgh, 1843-6)
- Notes of Debates and Proceedings of the Assembly of Divines, edited by David Meek (Edinburgh, 1846).
