= Mongeham =

Mongeham may refer to the following places in Kent, England:

- Great Mongeham
- Little Mongeham, AKA Mongeham Parva
