= Robert Waters =

American educator

Robert Waters (1835–1910) was an American educator and writer born in Scotland. In 1842, he moved to British North America, where his mother taught him to read and write. He worked as a type setter, and moved to the United States in 1851.

In 1862 he traveled to France where he worked in a printing office for a short period before beginning his career in education. He then moved to Germany to further his education, teaching English and French for four years there.

In 1868 he accepted an appointment back in the United States at Hoboken Catholic Academy in Hoboken, New Jersey. In 1883, he became the first principal of West Hoboken Public School, which today is known as Emerson Middle School in Union City, New Jersey.

John Selden and His Table Talk by Robert Waters

Robert Waters School in Union City is named after him.

== Books ==
- Cobbett's English Grammar (1883) -- edited and annotated.....
- How to Get on in the World; As Displayed in the Life and Writings of William Cobbett (1883) Open Library
- William Shakespeare portrayed by himself: a revelation of the poet in the career and character of one of his own dramatic heroes (1888) Open Library
- How Genius works its Wonders (1889)
- John Selden and his Table Talk (1899)
