= Richard Milward (priest) =

English Anglican priest (c. 1609–1680)

Richard Milward DD (c. 1609 – 20 December 1680) was a Canon of Windsor from 1666 to 1680.

== Career ==
He was educated at Trinity College, Cambridge and graduated BA in 1629, MA in 1632, and DD in 1662.

He was appointed:

- Rector of Braxted, Essex 1643 - 1680
- Vicar of Isleworth 1678 - 1680

He was appointed to the sixth stall in St George's Chapel, Windsor Castle in 1666 and held the canonry until 1680.

== Works ==
Milward acted as amanuensis to John Selden, and edited his Table Talk (1689).
