= Robert Gillespie (preacher) =

17th-century Scottish Presbyterian Preacher

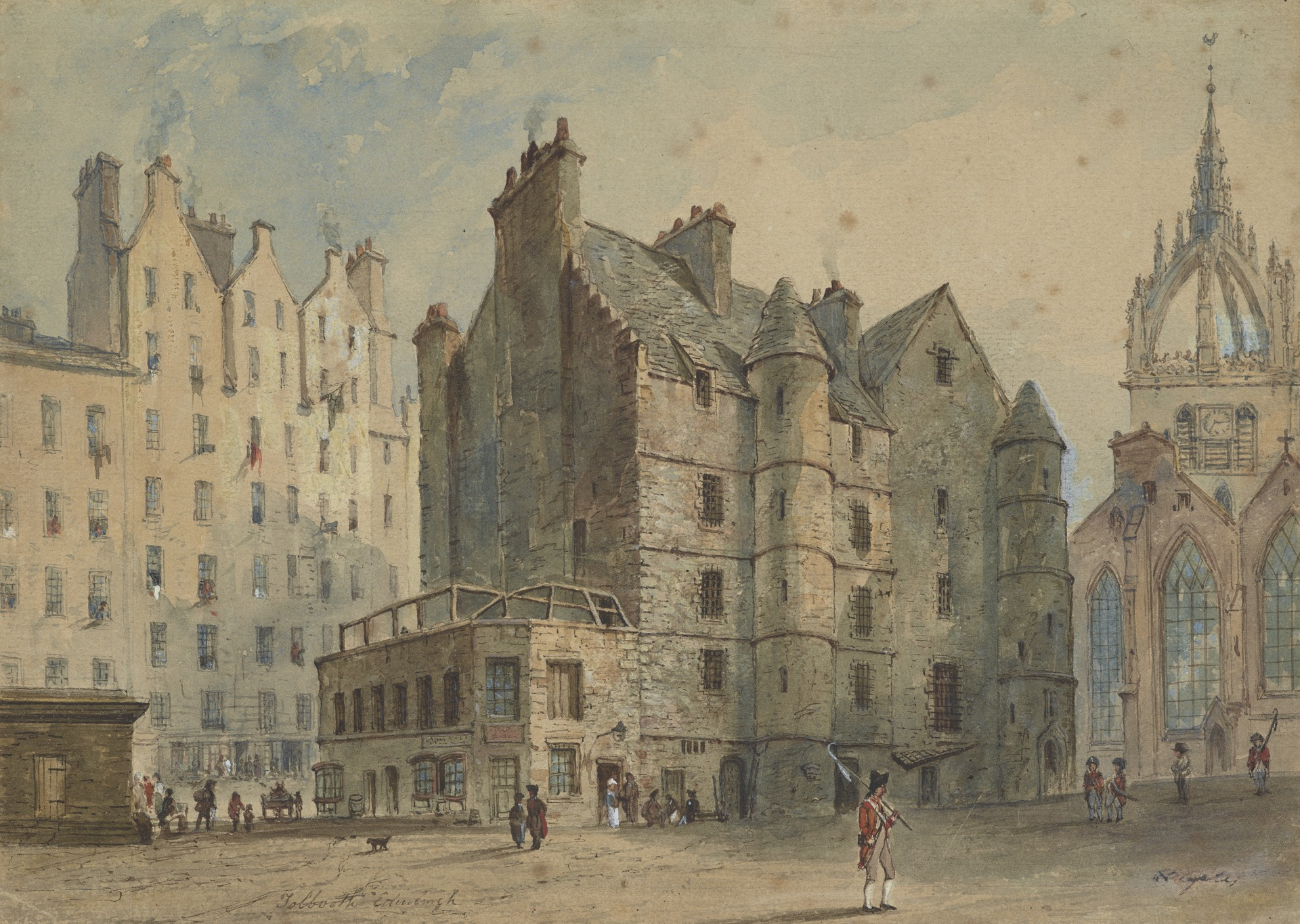
The Tolbooth (a Covenanting prison) and St. Giles Cathedral (where Robert's father preached), Edinburgh

Robert Gillespie was a 17th-century Presbyterian preacher. His father was George Gillespie the famous Westminster Divine. His mother was Margaret Murray, who had £1000 sterling voted by Parliament immediately after George's death, for the support of herself and family, but, owing to the distractions of the time, it was never paid. Robert was baptised 15 May 1643.

== Early ministry ==
He was probably licensed by some of the "outed ministers," as a statement in the Records of the Privy Council speaks of him as "preaching upon a pretended unlawful licence." Delated for having officiated at public conventicles and prayed at private ones, he failed to appear and was denounced as a rebel. This was in 1672. Gillespie, notwithstanding, continued to preach until the beginning of 1673, when he was apprehended and imprisoned in the Tolbooth of Edinburgh.

It is recorded that "Robert Gillespie, an irregular preacher "at the horn", was taken after a conventicle at Falkland, and on 2nd April sent by the Privy Council to the Bass to be immured." He was imprisoned on the Bass Rock between 2 April 1673 and 8 January 1674. He was the first person imprisoned there for Presbyterian principles.

There he was kept in carcere durissimo — closely shut up and excluded from all intercourse with his for two months. Before the end of 1673 — through the rigour of his imprisonment and the dampness of his cell—his health broke down. Gillespie soon after laid a request for release before the Privy Council, which was granted, and he was liberated on 8 January 1674 to his mother's house.

== After release from the Bass ==
On 4 June 1674, the Privy Council authorised and empowered the Lord Chancellor to give orders to parties of that troop of horse of his Majesty's guards under his command, to apprehend various ministers named, among whom Gillespie is mentioned, offering such as shall apprehend any of the two who were most obnoxious a reward of £400 sterling, and such as shall apprehend Gillespie or any of the rest one thousand merks, and indemnifying them of any slaughter that should happen to be committed in apprehending any of them.

On 6 August 1675, letters of inter-communing were issued against Gillespie and the individuals who along with him had been denounced rebels the preceding year; prohibiting all "to reset, supply, or inter-commune with any of the foresaid persons our rebels, for the causes foresaid, nor furnish them with meat, drink, house, harbour, victual, nor any other thing useful or comfortable to them, nor have intelligence with them by word, writ, or message, or any other manner of way, under pain to be reputed and esteemed art and part with them in the crimes foresaid, and pursued therefor with all rigour to the terror of others and requiring all sheriffs and other officers of the crown, and magistrates, to apprehend any of the persons intercommuned, whom they shall find within their respective jurisdictions, and to commit them to prison."

== Death and legacy ==
Date of death uncertain. Robert subsequently went to England, and died, his widow and children being recommended by Parliament to the royal bounty, 17 July 1695)

Porteous says Gillespie at length was forced to flee to Holland, where he died before the termination of the persecution. He also says that he was thus persecuted to the utmost, although he had never borne arms against the government. His case is a clear practical refutation of the assertion that the Covenanters were simply rebellious fanatics. He continues that it is interesting to know that his son George became minister of the parish of Strathmiglo, in Fife, after the Revolution, and was the friend of the celebrated Ebenezer Erskine.
