= Richard James (scholar) =

English scholar, poet and librarian

Richard James (1592 – December 1638) was an English scholar, poet, and the first librarian of the Cotton library.

== Early life ==
Richard James was born in Newport, Isle of Wight, third son of Andrew James, by his wife Dorothy, daughter of Philip Poore of Durrington, Wiltshire. Thomas James was his uncle. Richard was educated at Newport Grammar School, and matriculated as a commoner at Exeter College, Oxford, on 6 May 1608. On 23 September that year he migrated to Corpus Christi College, of which he had been elected scholar, and graduated from there B.A. on 12 October 1611 and M.A. on 24 January 1615. On 30 September 1615 he was elected probationary fellow of his college, and on 7 July 1624 graduated B.D.

== Traveller ==
After taking holy orders James set out on a long series of travels. Starting in Wales and Scotland, they extended to Shetland and Greenland. He went to Muscovy in 1618 as chaplain to Sir Dudley Digges. His notes about that journey (found in 1840s in Bodleian Library) included the first Russian-English Dictionary, remarks about Russian culture and six Russian folksongs about the Time of Troubles, making his papers an important source about Russian casual life and songs of the period.

In November and December 1618 he was at Breslau. In 1622 he was in Newfoundland. James had returned to Oxford by January 1623.

== Later life ==
In the latter part of 1624 James was employed with John Selden in the examination of the Arundel marbles, and when Selden published his Marmora Arundeliana in 1628 he acknowledged in his preface the assistance he had received from James. James had already been introduced to Sir Robert Bruce Cotton; he soon became Cotton's librarian, and the lists of contents prefixed to many manuscripts in the Cottonian collection are in James's handwriting.

In July 1629 he lent to Oliver St John the manuscript tract on the bridling of parliaments, written in 1612 by Sir Robert Dudley, titular duke of Northumberland. The tract was secretly circulated by St. John among the parliamentary leaders; Charles I and his ministers were roused, and James, with Cotton and others, was imprisoned by order of the privy council in the autumn of 1629. He was probably released, with the other defendants, on the birth of the Prince of Wales, 29 May 1630.

Whilst imprisoned in the Tower of London James wrote a letter pleading for his case to be reconsidered by Charles I of England. James protests the innocence of both Sir Robert Bruce Cotton and himself, claiming that neither of them were responsible for the pamphlet coming into the possession of Oliver St John.

On 22 October 1629 James was presented to the sinecure living of Little Mongeham, Kent, the only church preferment which he ever held. After Sir Robert Cotton's death in 1631 James remained in the service of his son, Sir Thomas, at whose house in Westminster he died early in December 1638 of a quartan fever. He was buried in St. Margaret's Church, Westminster, on 8 December; the register describes him as "Mr. Richard James, that most famous antiquary". James was unmarried. Some of his early poems are addressed to a lady, whom he styles Albina, afterwards the wife of Mr. Philip Wodehouse.

He had a wide circle of scholarly friends. They included Sir Kenelm Digby, Sir John Eliot (with whom he corresponded during his imprisonment, and whom he helped in preparing his treatises De Jure Majestatis and Monarchy of Man), Sir Henry Spelman, Ben Jonson (to whom he addressed a poem on his Staple of Niews first presented), Sebastian Benefield, Thomas Jackson, Brian Twine, and Thomas Greaves.

== Works ==
In 1636 he wrote Iter Lancastrense, a poem later printed in the 1845 volume of the same name, as part of the Chetham Society series, edited by Thomas Corser, with notes and an introduction in which many of James's minor poems are reprinted, together with extracts from some of his prose works. In 1880 A. B. Grosart published The Poems of Richard James (only one hundred copies printed), with a preface, in which he adds a little to Corser's account. This volume contains the Iter Lancastrense, The Muses Dirge, the edition of Hoccleve's 'Oldcastle,' the minor English and Latin poems collected from James's published works and MSS. James 13 and 35, and the Reasons concerning the unlawfulness of Attempts on the Lives of Great Personages. James left a number of manuscripts, which at his death passed into the possession of Thomas Greaves, with whose library they were acquired in 1676 for the Bodleian.
