= East Studdal =

Village in Kent, England

Coordinates: 51.199°N 1.319°E

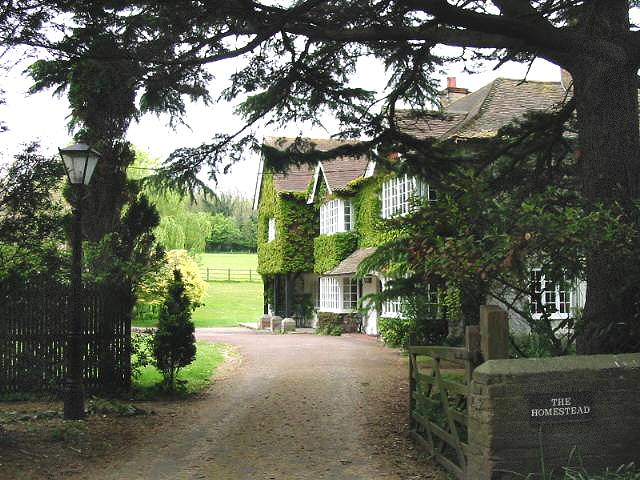
- Homestead Lane, East Studdal

- Location within Kent
- OS grid reference: TR319496
- District: Dover
- Shire county: Kent
- Region: South East
- Country: England
- Sovereign state: United Kingdom
- Post town: DOVER
- Postcode district: CT15 5
- Police: Kent
- Fire: Kent
- Ambulance: South East Coast

East Studdal is a village near Dover in Kent, England. The population of the village is included in the civil parish of Sutton.
