= Thomas Coleman =

English priest

Thomas Coleman (1598–1647) was an English clergyman, known for his scholarship in the Hebrew language, which earned him the nickname ‘Rabbi Coleman’, and for his Erastian view of church polity. In the Westminster Assembly he was the clerical leader of the Erastian party, alongside the lawyer John Selden. Selden praised him, with Thomas Erastus, in his De Synedriis.

== Life ==
He was a native of Oxford, and entered Magdalen Hall, Oxford in 1615. He graduated B.A. in 1618, M.A. in 1621, and took holy orders. He held for a time the rectory of Blyton in Lincolnshire, which he exchanged in 1642 for that of St. Peter's, Cornhill. Anthony Wood says that he died early in 1647.

== Works and views ==
He published sermons and tracts.

Lamont sees Coleman's preaching in 1644 as an important precursor of Thomas Hobbes, anticipating principles to be found in Leviathan. In 1645 Coleman was strongly opposed by George Gillespie. In A Brotherly Examination Re-examined (1645), Coleman summed up the position: Gillespie had conceded that the opposition to the Erastians, the Presbyterian and Independent groups in the Assembly, had in common their aversion to the Erastian approach. Matters were left to drift while the Presbyterians made hopeful comments about the possible good to come from orderliness within the churches. He could point to John Ley arguing just this way, to attack John Saltmarsh. But they made for strange bedfellows, with the Presbyterians now borrowing the positions of the Independents, considering that the actual contemporary situation was a breakdown of order, and all for the sake of denying the Erastian position of effective control through the state,

According to Lamont:

...Coleman, Prynne and their colleagues were Calvinists who believed that the reprobate majority must be disciplined into virtue (they were outraged by 'toleratorists'); they no longer believed, however, that the clerics were the men to administer that discipline.

Lamont sums up the Erastians in relation to theocracy in this way:

While Coleman and his fellow-Erastians were merely emphasising the failure of the Westminster Assembly and the dishonouring of the Covenant as signs of God's Displeasure, they were still talking the language of 'Godly Rule'. When they took the further step of generalising from this experience — of emphasising the inadequacy of any attempt to read God's Mind — they were moving beyond 'Godly Rule' and towards Hobbes.
