= Jean Barbeyrac =

French jurist

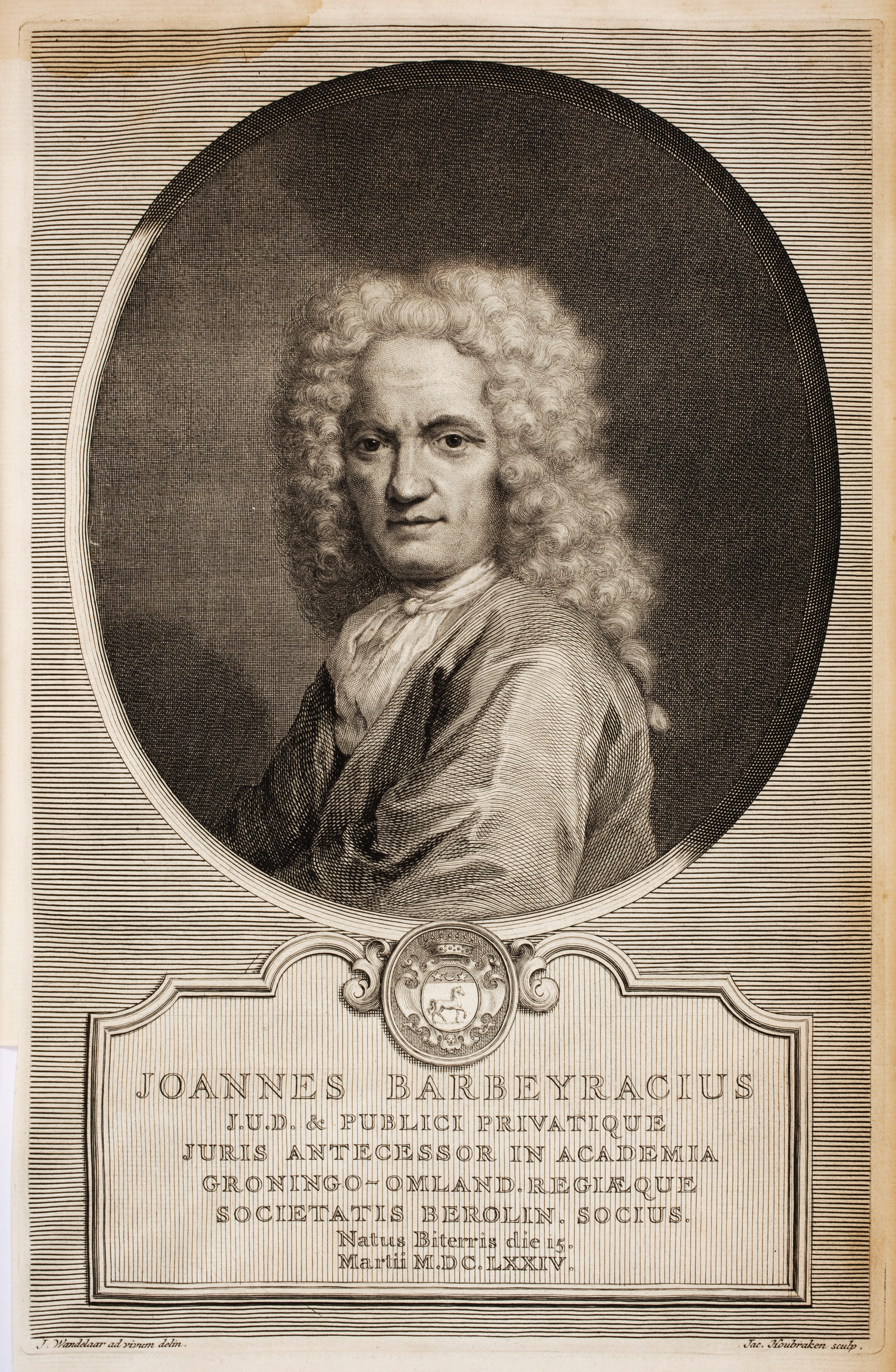
- Born: 15 March 1674; Béziers, Kingdom of France
- Died: 3 March 1744 (aged 69); Groningen, Dutch Republic
- Occupation: Professor of law

Jean Barbeyrac (French: [baʁbɛʁak]; 15 March 1674 – 3 March 1744) was a French jurist and translator. He was a French Huguenot who translated influential works by Hugo Grotius, Samuel von Pufendorf, Richard Cumberland, and others into French.

== Life ==
Born at Béziers in lower Languedoc, France, Barbeyrac was the nephew of Charles Barbeyrac, a distinguished physician of Montpellier. He moved with his family into Switzerland after the Edict of Fontainebleau. After spending some time at Geneva and Frankfurt am Main, he became professor of belles-lettres in the French school of Berlin. In 1711, he was called to the professorship of history and civil law at Lausanne, finally settling as professor of public law at Groningen.

== Works ==
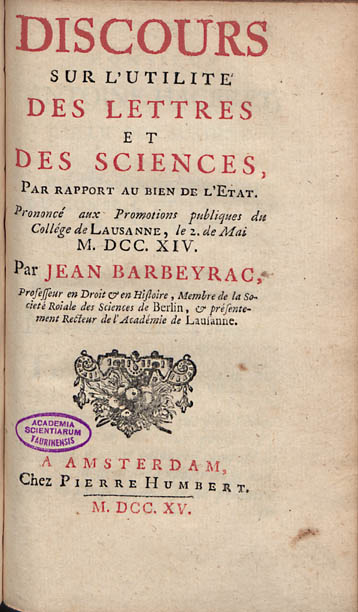
Discours sur l'utilité des lettres et des sciences, par rapport au bien de l'Etat, 1715

Barbeyrac is known chiefly for his preface and notes to his translation of Samuel Pufendorf's treatise De Jure Naturae et Gentium, translated as Of the Law of Nature and Nations. The preface appears in the fourth edition, with the title: 'Containing an Historical and Critical Account of the Science of Morality, and the Progress It has Made in the World, From the Earliest Times Down to the Publication of This Work'. In the fundamental principles, he almost entirely follows Pufendorf and John Locke, but also writes on the theory of moral obligation, referring it to the command or will of God. He indicates the distinction, developed more fully by Christian Thomasius and Immanuel Kant, between the legal and moral qualities of action. He reduces the principles of international law to those of the law of nature and in so doing opposes many of the positions taken up by Hugo Grotius. He rejects the notion that sovereignty in any way resembles property, and makes marriage a matter of civil contract. He also translated Grotius' book De jure belli ac pacis, Richard Cumberland's De Legibus Naturae, and Pufendorf's smaller treatise De Officio Hominis et Civis.

Among Barbeyrac's own productions are a treatise, De la morale des pères; a history of ancient treaties, Histoire des anciens traitez, contained in the Supplement au Corps universel diplomatique du droit des gens; and Traité du jeu (1709), in which he defends the morality of games of chance.

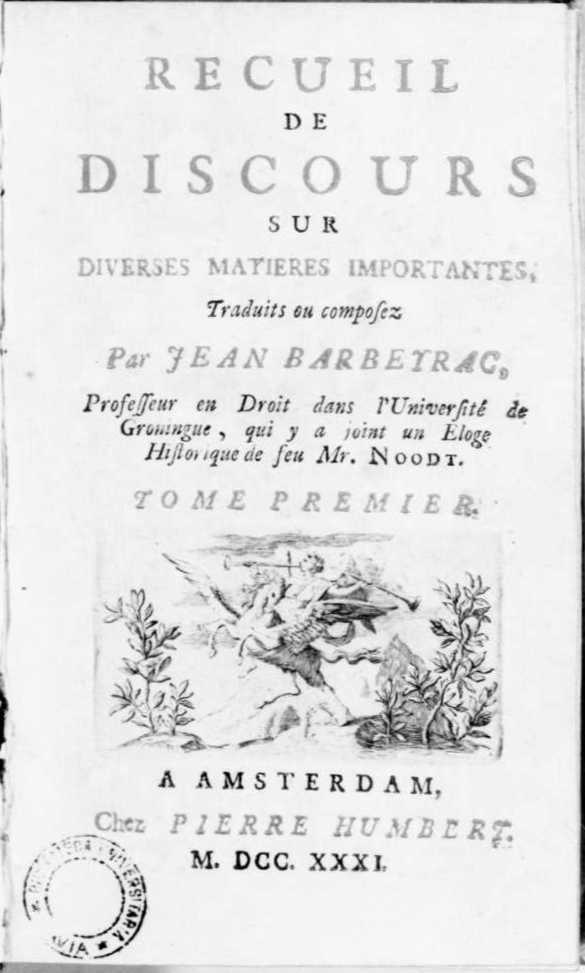
Recueil de discours sur diverses matieres importantes, 1731
