= Thomas Erastus =

Swiss Calvinist theologian and physician (1524–1583)

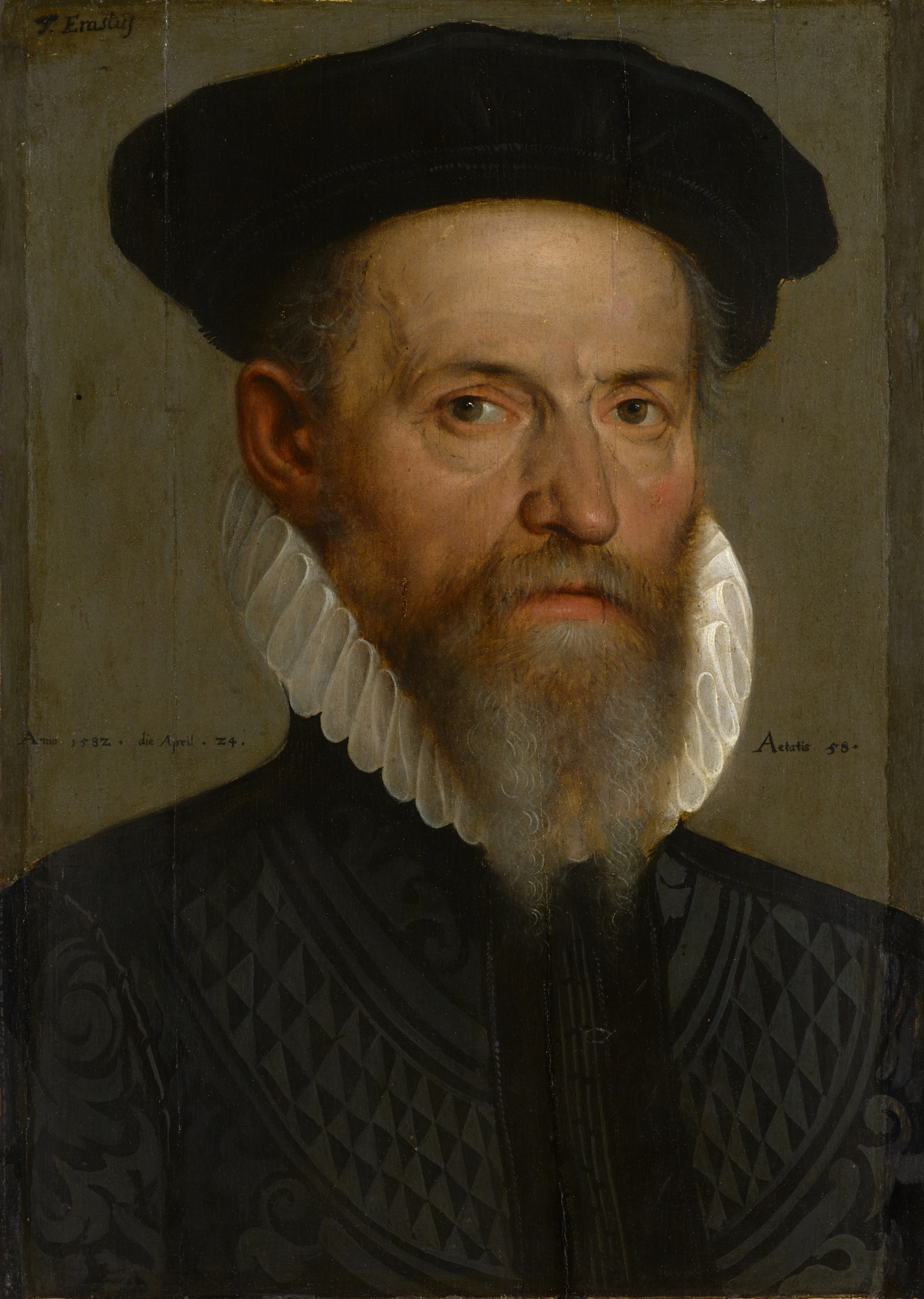
- by Tobias Stimmer, 1582
- Born: 7 September 1524; Baden bei Zürich (in modern Aargau)
- Died: 31 December 1583 (aged 59); Basel
- Education: University of Basel; University of Bologna; University of Padua
- Known for: Opposition to Paracelsus; Erastianism (unity between the church and state)
- Scientific career
- Fields: Medicine, theology
- Workplaces: University of Heidelberg
- Academic advisors: Luca Ghini
- Notable students: Petrus Ryff

Thomas Erastus (original surname Lüber, Lieber, or Liebler; 7 September 1524 – 31 December 1583) was a Swiss physician and Calvinist theologian. He wrote 100 theses (later reduced to 75) in which he argued that the sins committed by Christians should be punished by the State, and that the Church should not withhold sacraments as a form of punishment. They were published in 1589, after his death, with the title Explicatio gravissimae quaestionis. His name was later applied to Erastianism.

== Biography ==
He was born of poor parents on 7 September 1524, probably at Baden bei Zürich, then in canton of Aargau, Switzerland. In 1540 he was studying theology at the University of Basel. The plague of 1544 drove him to the University of Bologna and from there to the University of Padua as student of philosophy and medicine. In 1553 he became physician to the count of Henneberg, Saxe-Meiningen, and in 1558 held the same post with the elector-palatine, Otto Heinrich, being at the same time professor of medicine and pharmacology at the University of Heidelberg until 1580; Anselmus Boetius de Boodt was one of his students. His patron's successor, Frederick III, made him a privy councillor and member of the church consistory in 1559.

In theology he followed Huldrych Zwingli, and at the sacramentarian conferences of Heidelberg (1560) and Maulbronn (1564) he advocated by voice and pen the Zwinglian doctrine of the Lord's Supper, replying in 1565 to the counter-arguments of the Lutheran Johann Marbach, of Strasbourg. He ineffectually resisted the efforts of the Calvinists, led by Caspar Olevian, to introduce the Presbyterian polity and discipline, which were established at Heidelberg in 1570, on the Geneva model.

One of the first acts of the new church system was to excommunicate Erastus on a charge of Socinianism, founded on his correspondence with Transylvania. The ban was not removed until 1575, Erastus declaring his firm adhesion to the doctrine of the Trinity. His position, however, was uncomfortable, and in 1580 he returned to the University of Basel, where in 1583 he was made professor of ethics. He died on 31 December 1583.

== Work ==
Erastus published several pieces focused on medicine, astrology, alchemy, and attacked in his publications the system of Paracelsus. In doing so, he defended medieval tradition in general, and Galen in particular, while conceding some merit to specific points in Paracelsus. His name is permanently associated with a posthumous publication, written in 1568. Its immediate occasion was the disputation at Heidelberg in 1568 for the doctorate of theology by George Withers, an English Puritan (subsequently Archdeacon of Colchester), silenced in 1565 at Bury St Edmunds by Archbishop Parker. Withers had proposed a disputation against vestments, which the university would not allow; his thesis affirming the excommunicating power of the presbytery was sustained.

The Treatise of Erastus (1589) was published by Giacomo Castelvetro, who had married Erastus's widow. It consists of seventy-five Theses, followed by a Confirmatio in six books. An appendix of letters to Erastus by Heinrich Bullinger and Rudolf Gwalther, showed that the Theses, written in 1568, had been circulated in manuscript form. An English translation of the Theses, with a brief account of the life of Erastus (based on Melchior Adam's account), was issued in 1659, entitled The Nullity of Church Censures; it was reprinted as A Treatise of Excommunication (1682) and was revised by Robert Lee, D.D., in 1844.

=== Erastianism ===
In his Theses, he argued that the sins committed by Christians should be punished by the State, and that the Church should not withhold sacraments as a form of punishment. Thus, not only civil offences but also ecclesiastical ones would be punished by the state. The term Erastianism initially referred to this position, but later, in the course of debates that took place in England during the 17th century, acquired a more general meaning and came to refer to the view that the state should have supremacy over the church in ecclesiastical matters (cf. Caesaropapism).

According to the Catholic Encyclopedia, "The Theses and Confirmatio thesium appeared together in 1589. The central question about which the "Theses" turned was that of excommunication. The term is not, however, used by Erastus in the Catholic sense as excluding the delinquent from the society or membership of the Church. The excommunication to which [it] alludes was the exclusion of those of bad life from participation in the sacraments."

Those holding Erastus' view in the Westminster Assembly included John Selden, John Lightfoot, Thomas Coleman and Bulstrode Whitelocke, whose speech in 1645 is appended to Lee's version of the Theses. However, after much controversy, the opposite view was carried, with Lightfoot alone dissenting. The consequent chapter of the Westminster Confession of Faith (Of Church Censures) was not ratified by the English parliament.
