= Hezekiah Burton =

Hezekiah Burton (1632–1681) was an English theologian.

== Life ==
He was educated in Sutton-on-Lound and at Magdalene College, Cambridge, where he became a Fellow.

He was an associate of a number of intellectual figures of the day, in particular Richard Cumberland whose De legibus naturae he edited and to which he contributed an Address to the Reader. He is mentioned in Pepys's Diary. He was chaplain to Orlando Bridgeman, and used the contact to support Cumberland.

He was characterised as a Latitudinarian. He associated with John Tillotson and Edward Stillingfleet, involved with them and John Wilkins in an abortive proposal for a comprehension of presbyterians within the Church of England, communicated by Bridgeman to Richard Baxter and others in early 1668. Anthony Wood says that a club formed by Wilkins to promote comprehension used to meet at the 'chambers of that great trimmer and latitudinarian, Dr. Hezekiah Burton.'

A position as rector of Barnes he obtained through Tillotson in 1680 was cut short by his death from illness. He had previously been a prebendary of Norwich, and from 1668 rector of St George the Martyr Southwark.

== Works ==
- Several Discourses, viz., I. of purity and charity, II. of repentance, III. of seeking first the kingdom of God (1684)
- A Second Volume of Discourses (1685)
