= Ernest Albee =

American philosopher

- Born: 8 August 1865; Langdon, New Hampshire, U.S.
- Died: 1927 (aged 61–62)

Education
- Education: Cornell University (PhD)

Philosophical work
- Era: 19th-century philosophy
- Region: Western philosophy
- School: Utilitarianism
- Institutions: Cornell University
- Main interests: Ethics, Political philosophy, History of philosophy
- Notable works: A History of English Utilitarianism; The Beginnings of English Utilitarianism

Ernest Albee (8 August 1865 – 1927) was an American philosopher associated with Cornell University. He is known for historical work on the development of English utilitarian thought.

== Books ==
- A History of English Utilitarianism (first published 1902; reprinted Routledge/Thoemmes 2003).
- The Beginnings of English Utilitarianism (reprinted by Wentworth Press; originally published early 20th c.).
