= Sutton, Kent =

Village in Kent, England

Coordinates: 51.195°N 1.34°E

Sutton
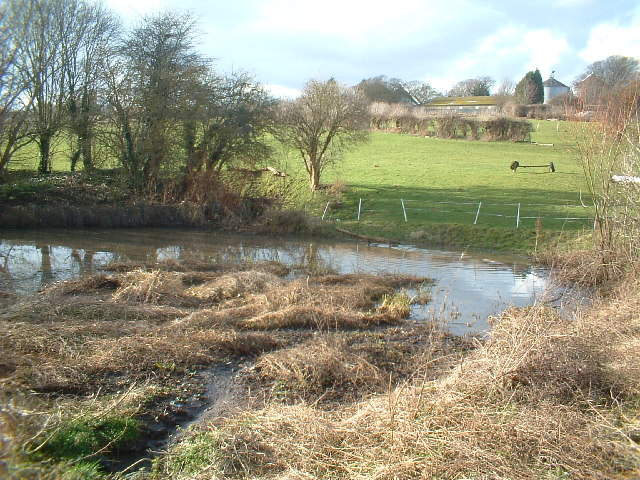
- A duck pond in Sutton

- Location within Kent
- Population: 772 (2011)
- OS grid reference: TR3349
- District: Dover
- Shire county: Kent
- Region: South East
- Country: England
- Sovereign state: United Kingdom
- Post town: Dover
- Postcode district: CT15
- Police: Kent
- Fire: Kent
- Ambulance: South East Coast

Sutton is a village and civil parish near Dover in Kent, England. In 1935 this village became a parish when the small settlements of Studdal, Sutton, Ashley, Little Mongeham and Maydensole joined to become the Parish of Sutton-by-Dover. Prior to this Sutton has had a vast history of agricultural practices, which has helped sustain the village into the parish it is today. The quoted population includes the villages of East and West Studdal plus Swingate and the hamlet of Little Mongeham.

== Leisure and recreation ==
The parish of Sutton has various recreational areas scattered throughout its settlements. For example, there is a sports field located on the north side of Downs Road, which consists of a large field divided into a children's playground area, and containing both a BMX track and a games pitch. The allotments and community orchard, which are situated north of Chapel Lane and accessible via a path along the roadside, have been planted with traditional English apples trees, and maintained by the parish council. The parish is also home to a number of footpaths and trails, including the North Downs Way, along with a number of picnic areas such as Jack's Bush. The latter, situated at the peak of Downs Road, has extensive views across the Downs and Pegwell Bay.

== Settlements within the parish ==
=== Ashley ===
Containing the only pub in the parish, the small settlement of Ashley contains a mixture of building styles, dating predominantly from the 1940s. Ashley's older properties are clustered in the centre of the hamlet at the intersection of the roads and paths, with one of the oldest of these being a thatched cottage. Expanding outwards from the centre, the development has grown along Waldershare Road to the West and Chapel Lane to the east, which is the main road running through this settlement.

The buildings along "Waldershare Road consist mainly of detached bungalows, which are built on both sides of the road". "The facade of the road comprises hedge and brick walls, with all the houses being located further back from the road, behind small front gardens". In comparison, the houses which run along "Chapel Lane are detached modern bungalows, which are divided with two short terraces dating from the early 1900s". In comparison to "Waldershare Road, development has only occurred on one side of the road".

=== Maydensole and Napchester ===
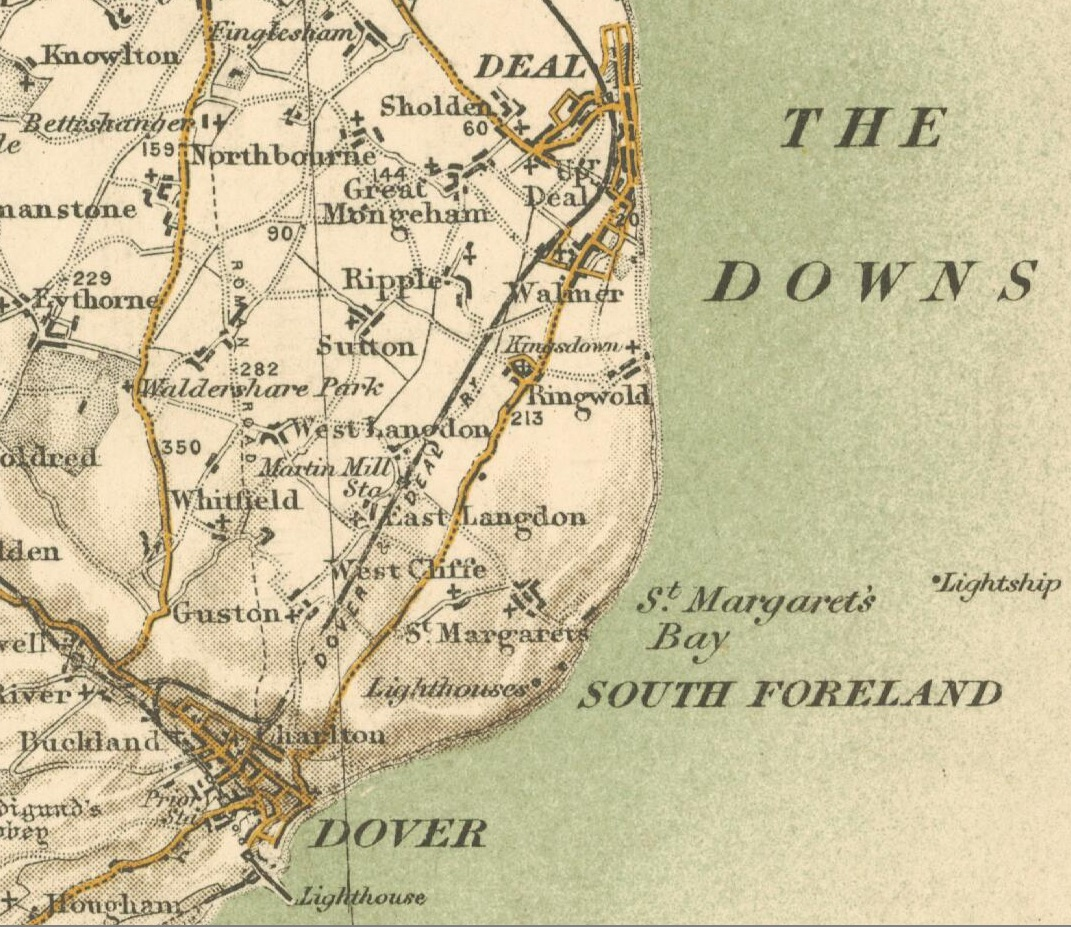
20th Century Map of Sutton, Kent

The small hamlets of Maydensole and Napchester were founded around the farms after which they are named. Great Napchester Farm, founded before 1583, was altered many times in the 18th and 19th century, and is now a residential farm in a rural setting. Maydensole Farm was altered and extended to its present size in 1790; there have been minimal alterations since then.

=== Studdal ===
East Studdal, which has developed around the junction of Skraters Hill, Downs Road, Stoenheap Road and Homestead lane, lies in the centre of the parish and contains a community centre, playground, sports field, church hall and a small shop. Over the years, East Studdal has expanded slowly. Small developments were constructed for specific purposes, such as colliery or council houses. There is little litter, graffiti or vandalism. The building materials vary throughout the settlement, from stock bricks, red and brown clay and pebble dash, to textured concrete tiles and slates for roofs.

Stoneheap Road consists of individually designed residences, ranging from barn conversions to small bungalows. Houses along Dowsn Road are semi-detached and were built in the 1930s for colliery workers. Homestead Lane, the oldest part of the settlement, contains mostlyl stock brick dwellings.

=== Little Mongeham ===
The small hamlet of Little Mongeham contains sixteen houses on approximately 1000 acres of land. Once containing a parish church which was lost to ruin in the 18th century, the hamlet still contains a number of historic landmarks, such as Little Mongeham House, a striking brick built dwelling, topped by an unusual viaduct-style abutment between its chimney stacks. In comparison, Manor Farm has a Kent peg roof and is half clad in hanging clay tiles. Away from the cluster of older dwellings there are several modern bungalows, some of which are chalet style, which have been built from yellow stock bricks, with roofs composed mainly of slate or in some cases red clay titles.

== Demographics ==
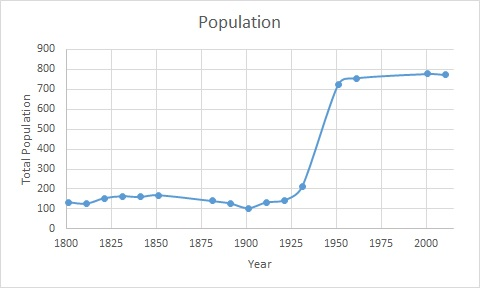
Total population of Sutton, Kent as reported by the census of population from 1801-2011

=== Population ===
Since data collection began in 1801, population figures remained very similar between this year and 1931, whereby up until then there have been minimal increases and decreases in total population. In 1801 the total population stood at 134 (65 males and 69 females) and after a century, these figures fluctuated very little, whereby in 1931 the total population was 212 with there being an even split of males and females. Over the duration of 130 years the total population increased by only 78, averaging an increase 0.6 people per year. However, between 1931 and 1951 the total population increased significantly, whereby over a 20-year period 511 people had moved into this area, which when compared to the statistical data from previous years is a substantial gain, which fails to fit the norm.

=== Occupational structure ===
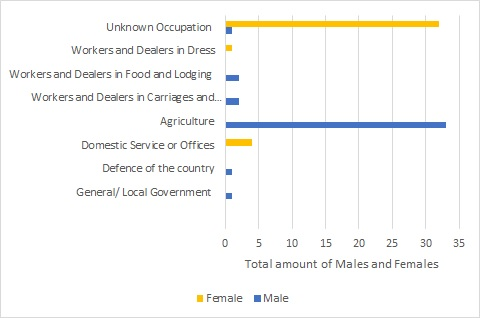
Occupational Structure in Sutton, 1881

The occupational structure of Sutton in 1881 illustrates a clear distinct variation between the individual job categories, depending upon the gender of the worker. The 1881 census data shows that a vast majority of the male workers during this time primarily worked in the agricultural industry, specifically given the time period, as farmers. By looking at the graph, you are able to identify a clear relationship between the topography of the surrounding environment and the industries which exist here. For example, one of the reasons agriculture exists here is due to the fact that Sutton is situated in Kent, which predominantly contains flat land, making agriculture a viable line of work. This is due to the fact that "arable farming, the growth of crops such as wheat and barley", is best suited to the topography of this area. The flat land allows for seeds to be "easily sown into the soil allowing for greater growth and improved crop yields, consequently meaning harvesting would also be more efficient and successful".

Occupational structure for Sutton, 1881 showing male percentage

Furthermore, gender inequality also exists here, regarding the number of females working in this industry, as zero females were reportedly employed in this sector, compared to the 33 males which were. One reason for this was that in the 19th century, gender roles, which are structured around femininity and masculinity, were conceptions of what society deemed acceptable. As a result, gender inequality existed here, in that the role of a male in society was to provide for their family, typically engaging in work involving manual labour; whereas the role of a woman was oriented to the home, raising children and caring for the family. Evidence of this can be seen in the graph, as 86% of women in the village are in unknown occupations. The second most common occupation for women here is domestic services with four females working in this sector, suggesting that women worked as carers or nannies.

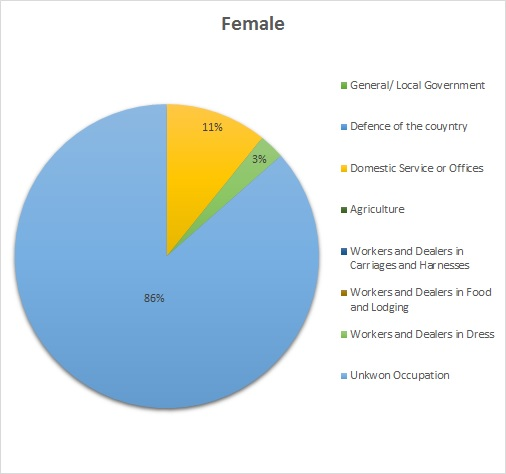
Occupational structure for Sutton, 1881 showing female percentage

== Parish history ==
For many years, farmers have been attracted to Sutton because of the light and easily tilled chalky soils. The Royal Commission on the Historic Monuments of England have identified crop marks, tracks and ditches dating from the Iron Age to the Roman period. In the following centuries, farmsteads developed across the parish, many of which still exist".

=== St Peter and St Paul's Church ===
St Peter and St Paul’s is located along East Sutton Road and is in the far North East of Deanery, bordering on the parishes of the North Downs Deanery to the North, Sutton Valence to the West and Headcorn to the South. The church, which has been standing for 800 years, is the key feature of this small village, with services held every day from the Book of Common Prayer.

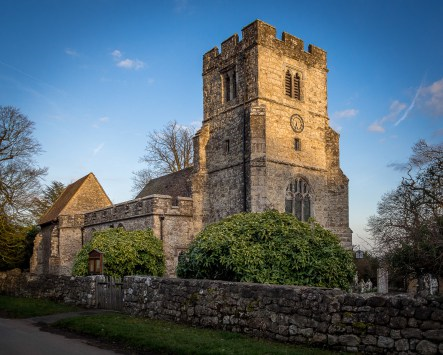
St Peters And St Paul's Church, East Sutton

Built in 1120 AD, the church was of vital importance to the local community. During the 9th century of King Alfred's reign in England, upon defeating the Vikings, he set about creating a new system of Christian learning that would reach illiterate people living in rural areas. The effects began to show in the 10th century, when Lords began to provide small chapels on their land where local people could use the services of a priest, laying the groundwork for the parish system". However, it was the Norman Conquest that ultimately defined the power of the church in England, whereby William the Conqueror implemented a country wide building project, encouraging the building of churches in all major towns and villages. This movement lead to the creation of the church in Sutton, which played a key role in community life, acting as a school, a market and an entertainment venue.

Today, the church still plays a vital role within the community. Keeping in touch with the community spirit, the church offers services for both local people and families, whereby on every third Sunday of the month, occasions such as Father's Day are celebrated. Furthermore, the church supports local and international charities, such as Family Care, Christian Aid and USPG, carrying out fundraising activities such as sponsored cycle rides and summer parties.

== Transport ==
Sutton lies in close proximity to two railway stations, Martin Mill and Walmer, both approximately 2.8 miles away. The stations situated along the South Eastern Railway Line, provide links to surrounding towns such as Dover, and Canterbury as well as the Capital City, London.

Due to Sutton's remote location, the nearest major road is the A256, located 11 miles west of Sutton. This road which precedes to link to the A2 further south can be accessed by Forge Lane or Downs Road.
