= David Wilkins (orientalist) =

Prussian orientalist (1685–1745)

David Wilkins (1685–1745), originally named Wilke or Wilkius, was a Prussian orientalist, born in Memel, who settled in England. His 1716 publication of the Coptic New Testament was the editio princeps.

== Life ==
He led for some years the life of a migratory student, visiting Berlin, Rome, Vienna, Paris, Amsterdam, Oxford, and Cambridge. Oxford denied him the M. A. degree (23 May 1712); but he became Lord Almoner's Professor of Arabic at the University of Cambridge in 1724, having been created D.D. in October 1717. He was supported by William Wake, Archbishop of Canterbury, who gave him employment.

Besides Arabic he was versed in Hebrew, Chaldaic, Coptic, Armenian, and Anglo-Saxon (with a certain want of accuracy). Wilkins was ordained in the church of England, and Wake made him in 1715 librarian at Lambeth Palace, and rector of Mongeham Parva (30 April 1716) and Great Chart (12 September 1719). He resigned both rectories on his collation in November 1719 to the rectories of Hadleigh and Monks Eleigh, Suffolk, and the place of joint commissary of the archiepiscopal deanery of Bocking, Essex. In the same year he was appointed domestic chaplain to the Archbishop. In 1720 he was appointed Canon of the 12th prebend at Canterbury Cathedral. He became archdeacon of Suffolk (19 December 1724). On 13 January 1720 he was elected F.S.A.

Wilkins died at Hadleigh on 6 September 1745. His remains were interred in the chancel of Hadleigh church. He married on 15 November 1725, Margaret, eldest daughter of Thomas Fairfax, 5th Lord Fairfax of Cameron, of Leeds Castle, Kent, by whom he left no issue. She died on 21 May 1750. Her brother Robert (afterwards seventh Lord Fairfax) is supposed to have purchased the greater part of Wilkins's manuscripts. The printed books were dispersed.

== Works ==
Wilkins was librarian at Lambeth for little more than three years; but during that time he improved and completed Edmund Gibson's catalogue, and also compiled a separate catalogue of the manuscripts. He contributed the Latin prefaces to John Chamberlayne's polyglot edition of the Lord's Prayer, and Thomas Tanner's Bibliotheca Britannico-Hibernica. He edited the following works:

- (1) Paraphrasis Chaldaica in Librum Chronicorum Amsterdam, 1715
- (2) Novum Testamentum Aegyptium, vulgo Copticum Oxford, 1716. A Latin translation from Coptic of the New Testament, published in 500 copies, it remained in print for 191 years, selling on average one copy every 20 weeks, and is recognised by Guinness World Records as the world's slowest-selling book.
- (3) Leges Anglo-Saxonicae Ecclesiasticae et Civiles; accedunt Leges Edvardi Latinae, Gulielmi Conquestoris Gallo-Normannicae, et Henrici I Latinae. Subjungitur Domini Henrici Spelmanni Codex Veterum Statutorum Regni Angliae quae ab ingressu Gulielmi I usque ad annum nonum Henrici III edita sunt. Toti operi praemittitur Dissertatio Epistolaris G. Nicoleoni de Jure Feudali Veterum Saxonum London, 1721
- (4) Johannis Seldeni Jurisconsulti Opera omnia tam edita quam inedita London, 1725, 1726, 3 vols., the works of John Selden
- (5) Quinque Libri Moysis Prophetae in Lingua Aegyptis London, 1731 (Bohairic Pentateuch)
- (6) Concilia Magnae Britanniae et Hiberniae a Synodo Verolamiensi A.D. 446 ad Londinensem A.D. 1717; accedunt Constitutiones et alia ad Historiam Ecclesiae Anglicanae spectantia London, 1737, 4 vols.
- (7) Thomas Tanner, Bibliotheca Britannico-Hibernica, a dictionary of all the authors who flourished in England, Scotland and Ireland before the opening of the 17th century, completed by David Wilkins and published in 1748.

His sole English publication seems to have been a Sermon preached at the Consecration of Thomas [Bowers], Lord Bishop of Chichester London, 1722, 4to. He left in manuscript Historical Account of the Church of Hadleigh which passed into the possession of his successor in the living, Dr. Tanner, and an Historia Ecclesiae Alexandrinae.
