= Stephen Nettles =

Stephen Nettles (fl. 1595 – 1647) was an English clergyman and controversialist.

== Life ==
He was a native of Shropshire, was admitted pensioner of Queens' College, Cambridge, on 25 June 1595, graduated B.A. in 1599, and was elected fellow on 11 October 1599. He proceeded M.A. in 1602, and commenced B.D. as a member of Corpus Christi College, Cambridge.

In 1610 he became rector of Lexden, on 24 March 1617 vicar of Great Tey, which he resigned before 27 January 1638, and in 1623 vicar of Steeple, all in Essex. He signed the 1629 petition for conformity. During the period of the First English Civil War he ignored the Solemn League and Covenant, and continued to use the Book of Common Prayer. His livings of Lexden and Steeple were sequestrated in 1644, but he resisted the sequestration and his successor Gabriel Wyresdale until 1647, when he was removed from the rectory at Lexden.

== Works ==
He wrote a learned Answer to the Jewish Part of Mr. Selden's History of Tithes, Oxford, 1625, in answer to John Selden's history of tithes. He was ejected from his rectory on 16 August 1644 by force of arms.
