= Little Mongeham =

Hamlet in Kent, England

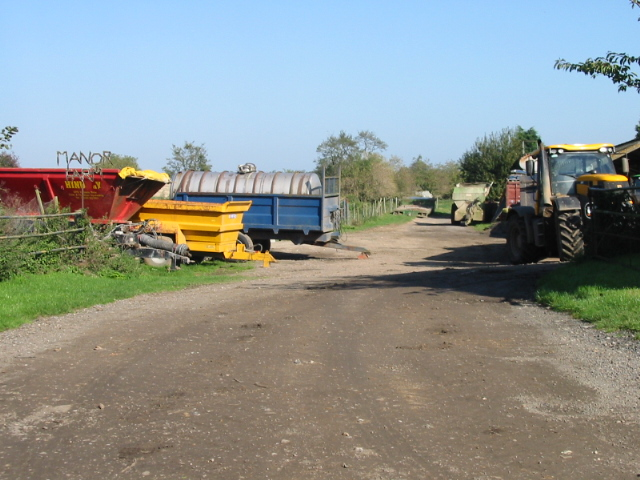
- Entrance to Manor Farm

- Location within Kent
- OS grid reference: TR3350
- Civil parish: Sutton
- District: Dover
- Shire county: Kent
- Region: South East
- Country: England
- Sovereign state: United Kingdom
- Post town: Dover
- Postcode district: CT15 5
- Police: Kent
- Fire: Kent
- Ambulance: South East Coast
- UK Parliament: Dover

Little Mongeham is a small hamlet and former civil parish, now in the parish of Sutton, in the Dover district, in Kent, southeast England, near Dover. The main buildings are Little Mongeham House and Manor Farm.

== History ==
Little Mongeham was until the early twentieth century a parish in its own right, including Studdal and Maidensole, and with its own rector, though the church has long since been in ruins, the foundations can still be found just to the southwest of the double bend in Willow Road through the village. The scholar Richard James held the living of Little Mongeham from 1629. In 1931 the parish had a population of 265. On 1 April 1935 the parish was abolished and merged with Sutton.

== Geography ==
The White Cliffs Country Trail runs through the middle of the village. Other paths strike out to neighbouring villages: to Sutton, East Studdal, Northbourne and Ripple.
