= Richard Hampden =

English Whig politician

Arms of Hampden: Argent, a saltire gules between four eagles displayed azure

Richard Hampden (baptized 13 October 1631 – 15 December 1695) was an English Whig politician and son of ship money tax protester John Hampden. He was sworn a Privy Counsellor in 1689 and was Chancellor of the Exchequer from 18 March 1690 until 10 May 1694.

== Life ==
Like his father and son he sided with Parliament against the House of Stuart. During the interregnum he was elected Member of Parliament for Buckinghamshire in the Second Protectorate Parliament of 1656 and voted in favour of offering the crown to the Lord Protector Oliver Cromwell. In 1657 he entered the Other House (the protectorate's House of Lords). He purchased the manors of Wendover Borough and Forrens from John Baldwin in 1660. Also in 1660 he was elected MP for Wendover (a constituency dominated by his family) in the Convention Parliament, and was elected to represent the same constituency in the Cavalier Parliament(1661–1679). After the fall of Earl of Clarendon in 1667, he became more active in politics, voicing his opposition to the war with the Dutch and the alliance with France. By the latter half of the 1670s, he was considered by the Earl of Shaftesbury to be an ally. Hampden was particularly active during the Popish Plot and undermined the authority of the Lord Treasurer the Earl of Danby.

He was re-elected to the Parliaments of 1679 and played an active part in the attempt to pass the Exclusion Bill to bar the Duke of York from the succession and also supported the bill to give toleration to Protestant dissenters. In 1681 he was elected to the Oxford Parliament for the county of Buckinghamshire (exchanging seats with his son John Hampden). During the convening of this short parliament he again supported exclusion.

In 1685, Hampden again represented the borough of Wendover but was far less active in politics as King James II, the man Hampden had tried to exclude from the succession, was now king. After the successful invasion by William of Orange, he chaired the committee of members of James II's parliament that on 27 December 1688, invited William to call a convention and to take over the government in the interim. Hampden sat in the Convention Parliament of 1689 and was a central figure in the enabling legislation to crown William and Mary. In February 1689 he became a privy councillor, and on 9 April became a commissioner of the Treasury.

In 1690 he represented the county of Buckinghamshire in William and Mary's first parliament, and in the same year was made Chancellor of the Exchequer. During the next five years, when his health allowed, he was active in the government. He did not stand for re-election to William and Mary's second parliament in 1695, and died on 15 December 1695.

== Family ==
He married Letitia Paget, daughter of William Paget, 5th Baron Paget, and had three children:

- John Hampden
- Richard Hampden, died young
- Isabella Hampden, married Sir William Ellys, 2nd Baronet.

Parliament of England
Preceded by George Fleetwood; Bulstrode Whitelocke; Sir Richard Pigot; Richard Greenville; Richard Ingoldsby	Member of Parliament for Buckinghamshire; 1656; With: Bulstrode Whitelocke; Sir Richard Pigot; Richard Greenville; Richard Ingoldsby	Succeeded by Richard Greenville; William Bowyer
Preceded by John Baldwin; William Hampden	Member of Parliament for Wendover; 1660–1681; With: John Baldwin 1660–1661; Robert Croke 1661–1673; Edward Backwell 1673, 1679–1681; Hon. Thomas Wharton 1673–1679	Succeeded by John Hampden; Edward Backwell
Preceded by Hon. Thomas Wharton; John Hampden	Member of Parliament for Buckinghamshire; 1681–1685; With: Hon. Thomas Wharton	Succeeded by Hon. Thomas Wharton; Viscount Brackley
Preceded by Edward Backwell; John Hampden	Member of Parliament for Wendover; 1685–1690; With: John Backwell 1685–1689; John Hampden 1689–1690	Succeeded by Richard Beke; John Backwell
Preceded by Hon. Thomas Wharton; Sir Thomas Lee, 1st Baronet	Member of Parliament for Buckinghamshire; 1690–1695; With: Hon. Thomas Wharton	Succeeded by Hon. Thomas Wharton; Sir Richard Atkins, 2nd Bt
Political offices
Preceded by The Lord Delamer	Chancellor of the Exchequer of England; 1690–1694	Succeeded by Charles Montagu
