= John Hampden (disambiguation) =

John Hampden (c. 1595–1643) was an English parliamentarian and a central figure at the start of the English Civil War.

John Hampden may also refer to:

- John Hampden (MP) (c. 1387–c. 1459), MP for Buckinghamshire, 1420, 1437
- John Hampden (1653–1696) grandson of John Hampden; coined the term "Glorious Revolution"
- John Hampden (1696–1754) great grandson of John Hampden
- John Hampden, flat-earth proponent involved in the Bedford Level experiment.

== See also ==
- John Hampden Grammar School, a secondary school in High Wycombe, Buckinghamshire
- John Hampton, governor of Western Australia
