= John Hampden (1653–1696) =

English politician and writer (1653–1696)

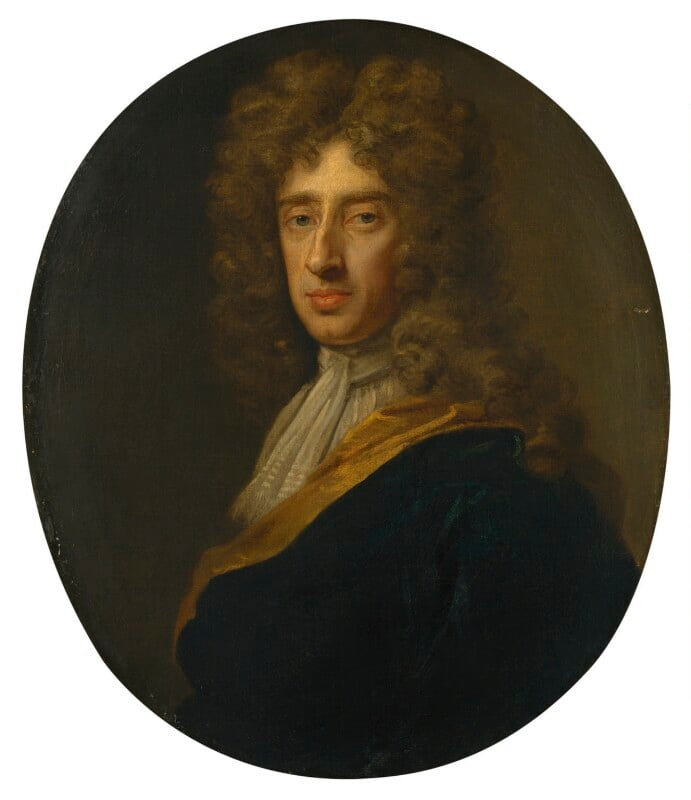
c. 1690 portrait of Hampden

Hampden's coat of arms: Argent, a saltire gules between four eagles displayed azure

John Hampden (21 March 1653 – 12 December 1696) was an English politician and writer. The second son of Richard Hampden, and grandson of ship money tax protester John Hampden, he returned to England after residing for about two years in France, and joined himself to William Russell and Algernon Sidney and the party opposed to the arbitrary government of Charles II. With Russell and Sidney, he was arrested in 1683 for alleged complicity in the Rye House Plot, but more fortunate than his colleagues his life was spared although, as he was unable to pay the fine of £40,000 which was imposed upon him, he remained in prison. Then in 1685, after the failure of Monmouth's rising, Hampden was again brought to trial, and on a charge of high treason was condemned to death. But the sentence was not carried out, and having paid £6000 he was set at liberty. In the Convention Parliament of 1689, he represented Wendover, but in the subsequent parliaments, he failed to secure a seat. It was Hampden who in 1689 coined the phrase "Glorious Revolution". He committed suicide on 12 December 1696. Hampden wrote numerous pamphlets, and Bishop Burnet described him as "one of the learnedest gentlemen I ever knew".

He married Sarah Foley (died 1687), and had two children:

- Richard Hampden (aft. 1674 – 27 July 1728), an MP and Privy Counsellor
- Letitia Hampden, who married John Birch MP as his second wife

After her death, he married Anne Cornwallis and had two children:

- John Hampden (c. 1696 – 4 February 1754), an MP
- Ann Hampden (died September 1723), married Thomas Kempthorne

== Notes ==
Parliament of England
Preceded by Sir William Bowyer, Bt; William Tyringham	Member for Buckinghamshire; 1679–1681; With: Hon. Thomas Wharton	Succeeded by Hon. Thomas Wharton; Richard Hampden
Preceded by Richard Hampden; Edward Backwell	Member for Wendover; 1681–1685; With: Edward Backwell 1681–1683	Succeeded by Richard Hampden; John Backwell
Preceded by Richard Hampden; John Backwell	Member for Wendover; 1689–1690; With: Richard Hampden	Succeeded by Richard Beke; John Backwell
