= John Backwell =

English politician

John Backwell (20 April 1654 – 15 April 1708) was an English politician, the son of the financier Edward Backwell.

In 1678, he married Elizabeth Tyringham, only daughter of Sir William Tyringham, by whom he had a son, Tyringham Backwell. He inherited his father-in-law's estates in Buckinghamshire, and was twice returned for Member for Wendover. With his father, he was appointed comptroller of customs in the port of London in 1671.

== Notes ==
Parliament of England
Preceded by John Hampden; Edward Backwell	Member for Wendover; 1685–1689; With: Richard Hampden	Succeeded by Richard Hampden; John Hampden
Preceded by Richard Hampden; John Hampden	Member for Wendover; 1690–1701; With: Richard Beke 1690–1701; Richard Hampden 1701	Succeeded by Richard Hampden; Richard Crawley
