= John Baldwin (MP) =

English politician

John Baldwin (died 1691) was an English politician who sat in the House of Commons in 1659 and 1660.

Baldwin was the eldest son of Thomas Baldwin of Cholesbury, Buckinghamshire. He was a student of Middle Temple in 1642. He was clerk to the parliamentary commissioners to Scotland from 1641 to 1642 and secretary to the Earl of Essex and provost-marshal-general to 1645. From 1645, he was a gentleman porter of the Tower of London. Before 1650 he purchased the manors of Wendover Borough and Forrens from George Gosnold and Robert Style and sold then in 1660 to Richard Hampden.

In 1659, Baldwin was elected Member of Parliament for Wendover in the Third Protectorate Parliament. In 1660, he was elected MP for Wendover in the Convention Parliament. On the Restoration he was replaced in his post at the Tower and not reappointed to the commissions of the peace. He lived quietly for the last 30 years of his life at Hillingdon.

Baldwin died in 1691 and was buried at Hillingdon on 13 October 1691.

Baldwin had a son and daughter by his first wife Elizabeth and no children by his second wife Mary.

Parliament of England
Preceded by Not represented in Second Protectorate Parliament	Member of Parliament for Wendover; 1659; With: William Hampden	Succeeded by Richard Ingoldsby; Thomas Harrison
Preceded by Richard Ingoldsby; Thomas Harrison	Member of Parliament for Wendover; 1660; With: Richard Hampden	Succeeded by Richard Hampden; Robert Croke
