= Rolf Decker =

German footballer

Personal information
- Place of birth: Germany
- Position: Midfielder

Senior career*
Years	Team	Apps	(Gls)
1946–1947	Aylesbury United	10	(0)
1949–1950	Aylesbury United	22	(1)
1950–1956	Brooklyn Hakoah		
1956–1963(?)	New York Hakoah		

International career
1953–1956	United States	4	(0)
- * Club domestic league appearances and goals

Rolf Decker is a German-American retired soccer player who played professionally with the New York Hakoah of the American Soccer League and earned four caps with the U.S. national team in between 1953 and 1956. He was a member of the U.S. Olympic soccer team at the 1956 Summer Olympics.

== Club career ==
Decker and his brother Otto were born in Germany, but grew up in England. In March 1939, the Decker's parents, Ilse and Hans, sent the two boys to England as part of the kindertransport, an organised rescue effort of Jewish children that took place during the nine months prior to the outbreak of the Second World War. Rolf went on to play twice for Aylesbury United F.C. The first time during the 1946–1947 season and again during the 1949–1950 season.

In 1950, Rolf and Otto moved to the United States to rejoin their mother who lived in New York City. When Rolf arrived in the U.S., he signed with Brooklyn Hakoah and played from at least 1951 through 1963 with the team which was by then known as New York Hakoah. In 1955, both Rolf and Otto played for the Hokoah squad which lost in the semifinals the National Challenge Cup. In 1957, Hakoah lost to St. Louis Kutis SC in the final of the National Cup. Between 1957 and 1959, Decker and his teammates won three consecutive league titles.

== International career ==
Decker earned four caps with the U.S. national team in between 1953 and 1956. His first game with the national team came on June 8, 1953, in a 6–3 loss to England. He played two games in 1954, both 1954 FIFA World Cup qualification victories over Haiti. Despite these two wins, the U.S. had already failed to qualify for the finals after losing twice to Mexico earlier in the year. Decker's last cap came in the only U.S. game of 1955, a 3–2 loss to Iceland on August 25, 1955.

Decker was selected for the U.S. soccer team at the 1956 Summer Olympics. The U.S. lost its first match in this single elimination tournament and did not make the second round.

== See also ==
- List of select Jewish football (association; soccer) players
