= Thomas Wharton, 1st Marquess of Wharton =

British politician (1648–1715)

The Most Honourable The Marquess of Wharton PC
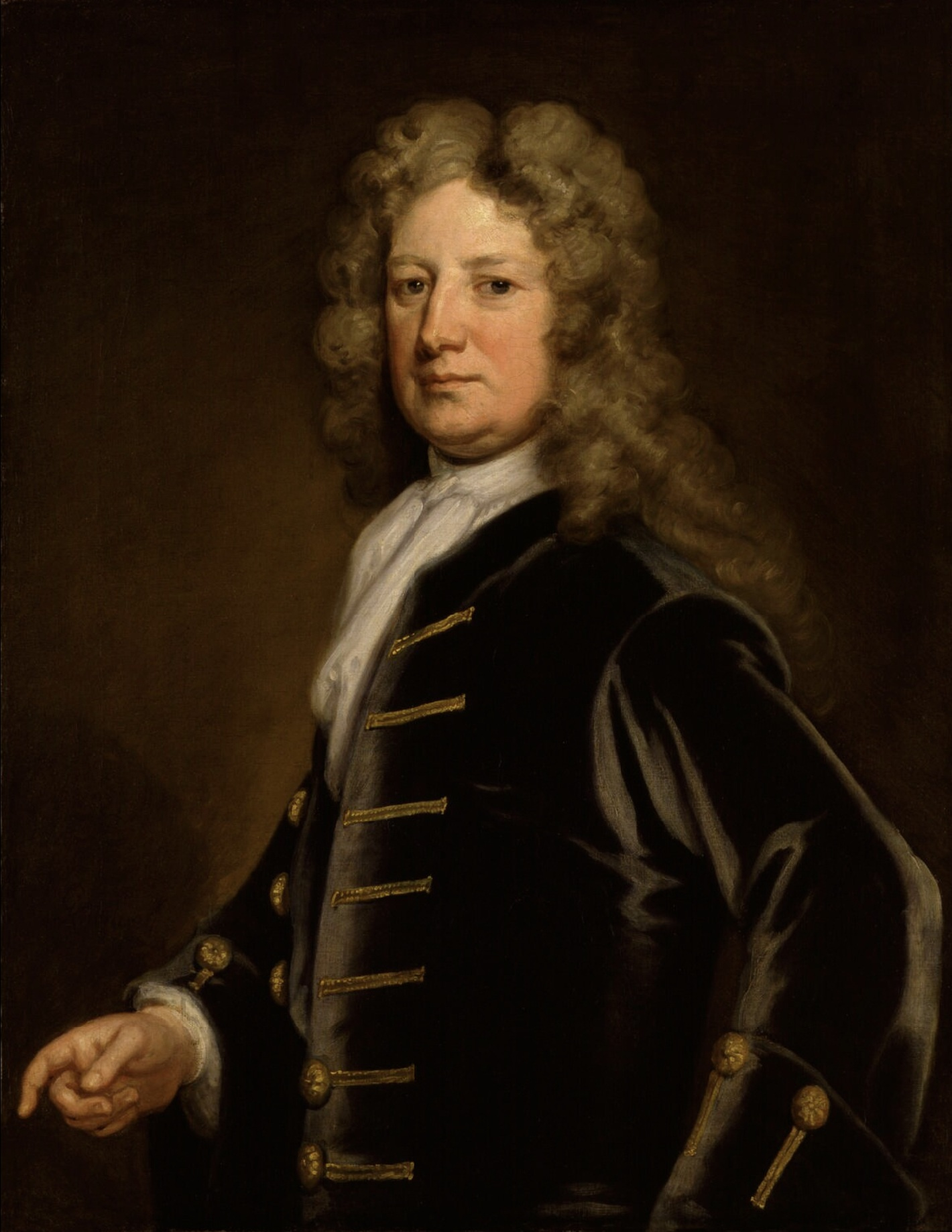
- Portrait by Godfrey Kneller, c. 1715

Lord Privy Seal
- In office 1714–1715
- Preceded by: The Earl of Dartmouth
- Succeeded by: The Earl of Sunderland

Lord Lieutenant of Ireland
- In office 1708–1710
- Preceded by: The Earl of Pembroke
- Succeeded by: The Duke of Ormonde

Personal details
- Born: August 1648
- Died: 12 April 1715 (aged 66)
- Children: 3, including Philip and Jane

Thomas Wharton, 1st Marquess of Wharton, PC (August 1648 – 12 April 1715) was a British Whig politician. A man of great charm and political ability, he was also notorious for his debauched lifestyle.

== Background ==
He was the son of Philip Wharton, 4th Baron Wharton, and his second wife, Jane Goodwin, only daughter of Colonel Arthur Goodwin of Upper Winchendon, Buckinghamshire, and heiress to the extensive Goodwin estates in Buckinghamshire, including Winchendon, Wooburn, Waddeston, Weston, and other properties.

== Career ==
In his long political career, he was a Member of Parliament for 17 years and spearheaded the Whig opposition to King James II's government, which later developed the two-party political system under Queen Anne. Before the Glorious Revolution, he was in close contact with a group of army officers conspiring against King James, including his brother, Captain Henry Wharton.

In 1689, he was sworn of the Privy Council and made Comptroller of the Household by King William III, establishing the link between the royal position and government for the first time, although William is said to have distrusted him.

He went out of office in 1702, after the accession of Anne, who disliked him intensely, and took great pleasure in personally taking his staff of office from him, but in 1706, he was created Earl of Wharton and Viscount Winchendon in the Peerage of England. He served as Lord Lieutenant of Ireland 1708–1710. He was replaced by the Tory Duke of Ormonde when the Harley Ministry came to power.

He supported the No Peace Without Spain motion in 1711. The following year, he attacked the government's creation of Harley's Dozen, 12 new Tory peers, in order to secure passage of their peace agreement.

== Character and scandals ==
Anne's antipathy to him was partly the product of her dislike for the Whig Junto, the "five tyrannising lords", which William III had shared to some extent, but owed far more to his debauched and irreligious character. Even by the standards of Restoration rakes, Wharton was considered a man "void of moral or religious principles". The most striking charge was that in 1682, when drunk, he had broken into the church in Great Barrington, Gloucestershire, urinated against the communion table and defecated in the pulpit. The story is probably true: certainly in 1705, during a debate on Church matters in the House of Lords, Wharton was left speechless when Thomas Osborne, 1st Duke of Leeds reminded him of it.

Despite his faults, he has been described as a man of immense charm, a fine public speaker and a "political organiser of genius". As the dominant politician in Aylesbury, he was partly responsible for the landmark constitutional case of Ashby v White, which established the principle that for every wrong there is a remedy.

It is rumoured that Wharton had taken Dorothy Townshend, née Walpole, as a lover prior to her marriage. Rumours suggest that her later husband, Charles Townshend, 2nd Viscount Townshend, may have either killed her or faked her funeral and hid her away at Raynham Hall. This rumour is based on the alleged infidelity of Dorothy during their marriage. She is also rumoured to haunt Raynham, known as the Brown Lady of Raynham Hall.

Macaulay's History of England describes Wharton in prose:

His mendacity and his effrontery passed into proverbs. Of all the liars of his time he was the most deliberate, the most inventive and the most circumstantial. What shame meant he did not seem to understand. No reproaches, even when pointed and barbed with the sharpest wit, appeared to give him pain. Great satirists, animated by a deadly personal aversion, exhausted all their strength in attacks upon him. They assailed him with keen invective; they assailed him with still keener irony; but they found that neither invective nor irony could move him to any thing but an unforced smile and a goodhumoured curse; and they at length threw down the lash, acknowledging that it was impossible to make him feel. That, with such vices, he should have played a great part in life, should have carried numerous elections against the most formidable opposition by his personal popularity, should have had a large following in Parliament, should have risen to the highest offices of the State, seems extraordinary. But he lived in times when faction was almost a madness; and he possessed in an eminent degree the qualities of the leader of a faction.

— Thomas Macaulay

== Last years ==
Under George I of Great Britain, he returned to favour. In January 1715, he was created Marquess of Catherlough, Earl of Rathfarnham, and Baron Trim in the Peerage of Ireland, and in February 1715 Marquess of Wharton and Marquess of Malmesbury in the Peerage of Great Britain.

When he died suddenly in April 1715, he was buried in Upper Winchendon, Buckinghamshire. He is the author of the original lyrics of Lillibullero, which "rhymed King James out of England".

== Family ==
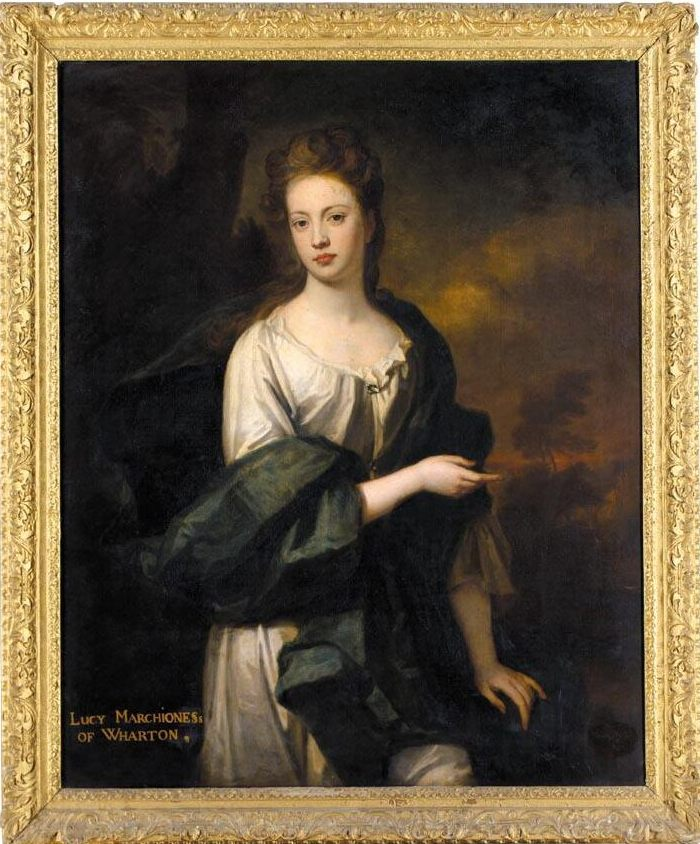
Wharton's second wife, Lucy Loftus

Wharton married firstly on 16 September 1673 Anne, or Nan, Lee (d 29 October 1685 aged 26), younger daughter of Sir Henry Lee, 3rd Bt. (d. 1659), an elder half-brother of the famous libertine poet John Wilmot, 2nd Earl of Rochester; she had some reputation as a poet and dramatist. They had no issues together. Her sister Eleanora Lee married James Bertie, Lord Norreys; their cousin was Edward Lee, 1st Earl of Lichfield. Although her husband may have infected her with syphilis, Anne Wharton left him her fortune. Her grandmother Anne St. John, Countess of Rochester tried to regain her fortune from the Whartons with little effect.

He married secondly Lucy Loftus, only daughter and heiress of Adam Loftus, 1st Viscount Lisburne and Lucy Brydges. They had one son Philip Wharton, 1st Duke of Wharton, and two daughters, Lucy Morice and Jane Holt. On his son's death without heirs, all his titles became extinct, except the Barony which passed to Jane Holt.

== See also ==
- Whig Junto

== Succession boxes ==
Parliament of England
Preceded by Richard Hampden; Edward Backwell	Member of Parliament for Wendover; 1673–1679; With: Richard Hampden	Succeeded by Richard Hampden; Edward Backwell
Preceded by Sir William Bowyer, Bt; William Tyringham	Member of Parliament for Buckinghamshire; 1679–1696; With: John Hampden 1679–1681; Richard Hampden 1681–1685; Viscount Brackley 1685–1686; Sir Thomas Lee, Bt 1689–1690; Richard Hampden 1690–1695; Sir Richard Atkins, Bt 1695–1696	Succeeded by Sir Richard Atkins, Bt; The Viscount Newhaven
Legal offices
Preceded by The 1st Earl of Abingdon	Justice in Eyre south of the Trent; 1697–1702	Vacant
Vacant	Justice in Eyre south of the Trent; 1706–1711	Succeeded by The 2nd Earl of Abingdon
Honorary titles
Preceded by The 1st Earl of Abingdon	Lord Lieutenant of Oxfordshire; 1697–1702	Succeeded by The 2nd Earl of Abingdon
Preceded by The Lord Jeffreys	Custos Rotulorum of Buckinghamshire; 1689–1702	Succeeded by The Viscount Newhaven
Preceded by The Earl of Bridgewater	Lord Lieutenant of Buckinghamshire; 1702	Succeeded by The Viscount Newhaven
Preceded by The 1st Viscount Lonsdale	Custos Rotulorum of Westmorland; 1700–1702	Succeeded by The Earl of Thanet
Preceded by The Earl of Thanet	Custos Rotulorum of Westmorland; 1706–1714	Succeeded by The Earl of Thanet
Preceded by The Earl of Thanet	Custos Rotulorum of Westmorland; 1714–1715	Succeeded by The 3rd Viscount Lonsdale
Political offices
Preceded by The Lord Waldegrave	Comptroller of the Household; 1689–1702	Succeeded by Sir Edward Seymour, 4th Baronet
Preceded by The Earl of Pembroke	Lord Lieutenant of Ireland; 1708–1710	Succeeded by The Duke of Ormonde
Preceded by The Earl of Dartmouth	Lord Privy Seal; 1714–1715	Succeeded by The Earl of Sunderland
Peerage of Great Britain
New creation	Marquess of Wharton; Marquess of Malmesbury; 1715	Succeeded by Philip Wharton
Peerage of Ireland
New creation	Marquess of Catherlough; 1715	Succeeded by Philip Wharton
Peerage of England
New creation	Earl of Wharton; 1706–1715	Succeeded by Philip Wharton
Preceded by Philip Wharton	Baron Wharton; 1696–1715	Succeeded by Philip Wharton
