= Edward Backwell =

English goldsmith-banker and politician

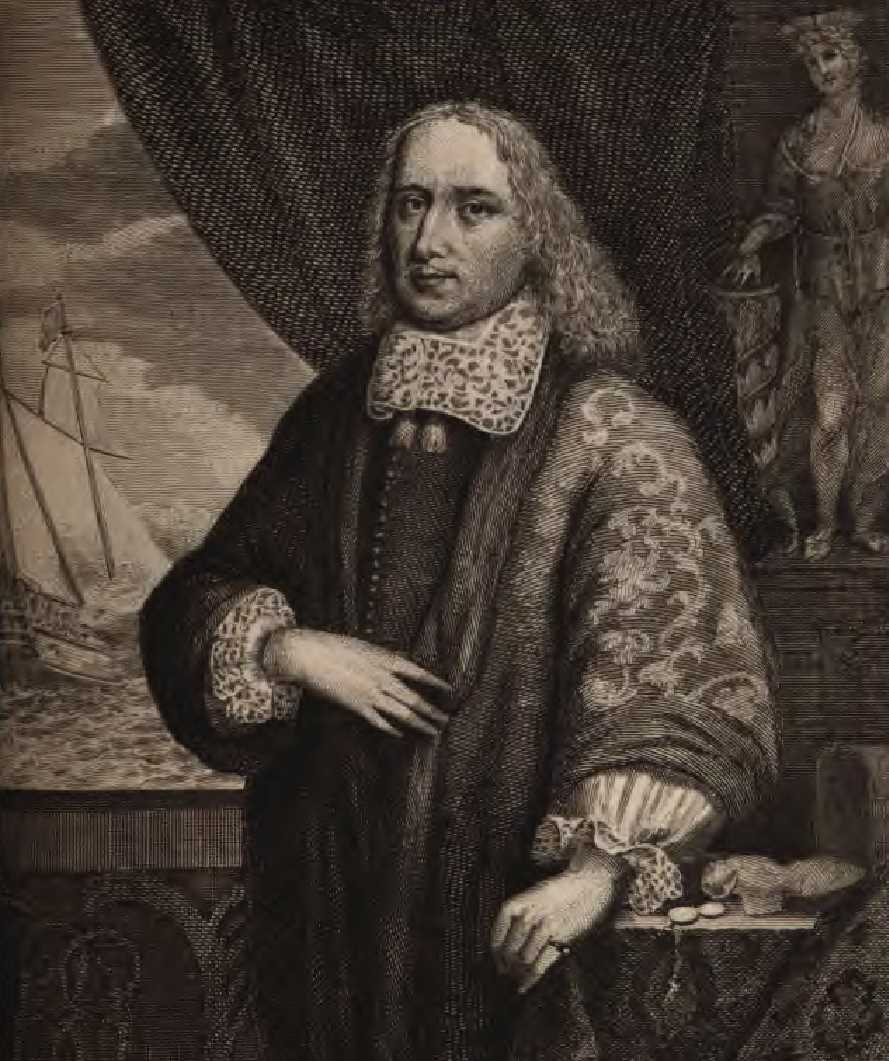
Edward Backwell

Edward Backwell (ca. 1618–1683) was an English goldsmith-banker, and politician who sat in the House of Commons at various times between 1673 and 1683. He has been called "the principal founder of the banking system in England", and "far and away the best documented banker of his time".

Backwell provided substantial financial support for the King Charles II government.

== Life ==
Backwell was the son of Barnaby Backwell, of Leighton Buzzard. He migrated to the City of London, where he was apprenticed to Thomas Vyner, a prominent London goldsmith-banker, in 1635. Like other goldsmith-bankers of the era, he was also played a role in State finance. He received his freedom of the Goldsmith's Company in 1651 and had his goldsmith's shop at the sign of the Unicorn in Lombard Street. During the time of the English Republic (1649-1660), Edward was deeply involved in credit finance, and dealt in former Crown property that had been put on the market. During the Commonwealth, he bought the park at Hampton Court and then resold it to the government, at a profit.

Blackwell was a rich merchant of the City of London. Following the capture of Dunkirk in 1658 by Anglo-French forces, Blackwell was appointed Treasurer of Dunkirk, which was ceded to England by Spain. After the Restoration of the monarchy he kept the position. In 1662 he was involved in the negotiations that led to the Sale of Dunkirk to France.

In the 1650s he was involved in bullion transactions and in 1657 helped Thomas Vyner to handle captured Spanish plate. He was also very actively involved as treasurer for the Dunkirk garrison, from the time of its capture and establishment as an English base in 1657 until its sale back to France in 1662. Together with Sir Thomas Vyner he was responsible for provision of money to the royal household and with handling bullion brought in for coinage at the Royal Mint.

In 1660, just before the Restoration, Edward was elected alderman of the City of London, but the following year he paid the customary fine to be excused from continuing to serve. He is the most frequently referred to financier in Samuel Pepys's Diary, which is perhaps indicative of his importance. Trading from his premises in Lombard Street, he was alderman for the City ward of Bishopsgate and the greatest banker of the early years of the Restoration. Among many others, Samuel Pepys was one of his customers.

He continued to operate in finance during the reign of Charles II. He was selected an alderman for Bishopsgate 1660–1661. Edward was a signatory to The Several Declarations of The Company of Royal Adventurers of England Trading into Africa, a document published in 1667 which led to the expansion of the Royal Africa Company.

One of the most prominent financiers of his time, Blackwell took deposits, lent money and provided foreign exchange services during the years leading up to the Stop of the Exchequer of 1672, which almost ruined him. However, in 1671 with his son John he had been appointed comptroller of customs in the port of London, and with his old master Vyner, he was from 1671 to 1675 a commissioner of the customs and farmer of the customs revenue.

Backwell owned land in Buckinghamshire and Huntingdonshire. In 1671 he was elected as a Member of Parliament for Wendover in a by-election to the Cavalier Parliament. He was re-elected a Member for Wendover in the second election of 1679 and again in 1681. He went bankrupt in 1682 and went to the Netherlands, where he died, his body being brought back to London and buried on 13 June 1683.

In 1657 Backwell married firstly Sarah Brett and had one son, John Backwell. In 1662, he married secondly Mary Leigh, who died in 1669, by whom he had three sons and two daughters.

Parliament of England
Preceded by Richard Hampden; Robert Croke	Member for Wendover; 1673; With: Richard Hampden	Succeeded by Richard Hampden; Hon. Thomas Wharton
Preceded by Richard Hampden; Hon. Thomas Wharton	Member for Wendover; 1679–1683; With: Richard Hampden 1679–1681; John Hampden 1681–1683	Succeeded by Richard Hampden; John Backwell
