= Robert Croke (died 1680) =

English lawyer and politician

Sir Robert Croke (c. 1609 – 8 February 1680) was an English lawyer and politician who sat in the House of Commons between 1640 and 1643.

Croke was the son of Sir Henry Croke, of Hampton Poyle, Oxfordshire and his wife Bridget Hawtrey, daughter of Sir William Hawtrey of Chequers. He matriculated at Balliol College, Oxford on 31 October 1629 aged 18 and was called to the bar at Inner Temple in 1635.

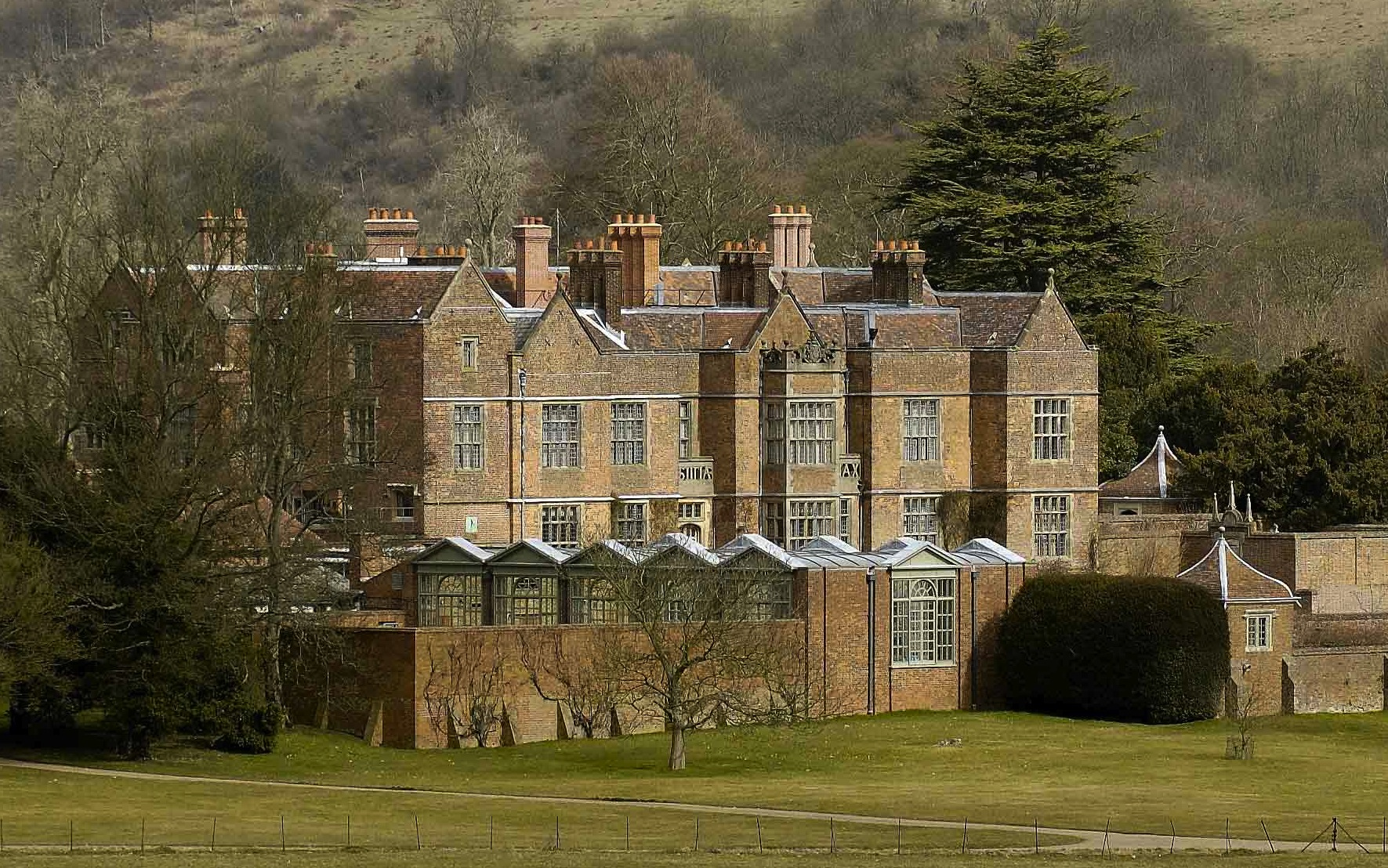
Chequers House

In April 1640, Croke was elected Member of Parliament for Wendover in the Short Parliament. He was re-elected MP for Wendover for the Long Parliament in November 1640 and sat until he was disabled from sitting on 15 November 1643. He supported the king and was knighted on 9 August 1641. He was created D.Med. at Oxford on 1 May 1644.

Croke had residence at Chequers which came to him through his mother, and another residence at Hampton Poyle. He was given the sinecure of Clerk of the Pipe at the Exchequer for life in 1659 and made a bencher of Gray's Inn in 1660.

Croke died at the age of 71. He had married Susannah Vanlore, daughter of Sir Peter Vanlore, 1st Baronet of Tilehurst, Berkshire His son Robert was also MP for Wendover but predeceased him. Chequers thereby passed to his daughter Mary, who had married John Thurbarne, sergeant-at-law and MP for Sandwich and in turn to their daughter, Joanna, the wife of John Russell, a grandson of Oliver Cromwell.

Parliament of England
Vacant Parliament suspended since 1629	Member of Parliament for Wendover; 1640; With: Sir Bennet Hoskyns, 1st Baronet 1640; Thomas Fountaine 1640–1643	Succeeded by Thomas Fountaine
