= Otto Decker =

German-American soccer player (born 1930)

Personal information
- Date of birth: 19 September 1930 (age 96)
- Place of birth: Germany
- Position: Forward

Youth career
- Royal Grammar School, High Wycombe

Senior career*
Years	Team	Apps	(Gls)
1948–1950	Wycombe Wanderers		
1952–1954	Brooklyn Hakoah		

International career
1953	United States	1	(2)
- * Club domestic league appearances and goals

Otto Decker (born 19 September 1930) is a German-American former soccer player who earned one cap, scoring two goals, with the U.S. national team in 1953.

== Youth ==
Decker and his brother Rolf were born in Germany, but grew up in England. In March 1939, their parents, Ilse and Hans, sent the two boys to England as part of the kindertransport at the outset of World War Two.

Decker attended the Royal Grammar School, High Wycombe, England, from 1948 to 1950 after transferring from Wycombe Technical Institute in 1948. While at RGS, he played both soccer and cricket, as the wicket keeper.

== National team ==
Decker earned his lone cap as a first-half substitute in the only U.S. game of 1953, a 6–3 loss to England. He came on after 30 minutes and scored in the 59th and 67th minutes.

He represented the U.S. as a halfback in soccer at the 1965 Maccabiah Games in Israel.
