= R v Hampden =

English legal case brought in 1637

- Court: Court of the Exchequer
- Decided: 12 June 1638

R v Hampden, commonly referred to as the Hampden Case, is an English legal case brought in 1637 concerning the legality of Ship Money in peacetime. Its ruling on the extent of the royal prerogative is considered to be constitutionally significant.

John Hampden, a Buckinghamshire landowner and member of Parliament, was taken to court after refusing payment of the third writ of ship money in 1636. The case, heard by the Court of the Exchequer was presided over by 12 judges led by Sir John Finch. Although the court ruled 7–5 in the Crown's favour, opposition to ship money, legitimised by the thin margin, continued until the Ship Money Act 1640.

== Background ==
Tradition of Ship Money

The Plantagenet kings of England had exercised the right of requiring the maritime towns and counties to furnish ships in time of war, and this duty was sometimes commuted for a money payment. Although several statutes of Edward I and Edward III, notably their confirmations of Magna Carta, had made it illegal for the Crown to exact any taxes without the consent of Parliament, the prerogative of levying ship money in time of war had never fallen wholly into abeyance. In 1619, James I aroused no popular opposition by levying £40,000 (equivalent to $9,344,675 in 2025) of ship money on London and £8,550 on other seaport towns.

The Personal Rule

Since the breakdown in the relationship between Charles I and Parliament had led Charles to embark upon Personal Rule, ship money represented an important way for Charles to raise money without having to gain Parliamentary consent for taxes.

Though Charles claimed the risk from Pirates and the state of European politics warranted it, the unprecedented use of ship money in peacetime sparked widespread opposition.

John Hampden

John Hampden, returned as a member of Parliament for the constituency of Wendover in 1625, 1626 and 1628, had previously opposed financial measures taken by Charles I to fund his wars. Although he paid £10 of £13 6s. 8d. required by the forced Privy Seal loan in 1626, he refused to pay the forced loan requested at Aylesbury in January 1627. As a result, he was imprisoned from January 1627 to 1628.

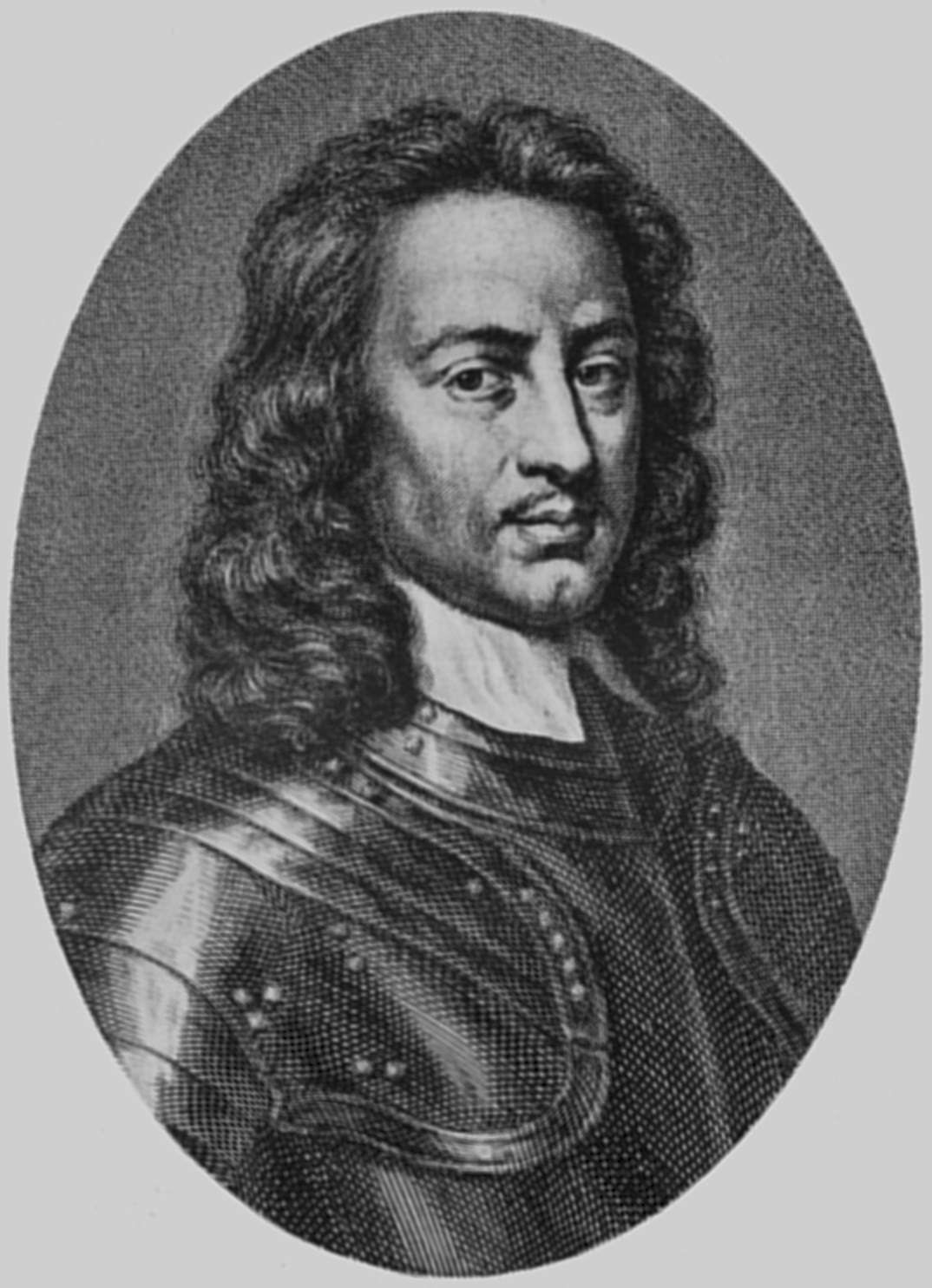
John Hampden, depicted in The Rise of the Democracy by Joseph Clayton.

Hampden paid in most of the parishes in which he owed ship money in the writ of 1635. However, he intentionally refused to pay the full amount to signal his issue with the writ's legality.

== Case ==
It is unclear why Hampden in particular was picked as a defendant to test the Crown's case. Others like William Fiennes, 1st Viscount Saye and Sele had been more vocal in their activism against the policy and expected to be challenged first. It has been suggested that Hampden was picked because of his relation to his uncle Sir Edmund Hampden.

Ultimately, the Court found that the royal prerogative, in times of emergency, covered the raising of funds through the seizure of private property. This right extended to the levying of ship money on all counties, not just coastal areas. It found that Parliamentary consent for ship money was not required.

The dissenting judgements of Sir Richard Hutton and Sir George Croke received public support for challenging the right of the Crown to infringe on the property rights of its subjects.

== Legacy ==
Despite the verdict against him, Hampden's resistance was regarded by many as a moral victory and he gained a national reputation. Manuscript copies of parts of the case, including Hutton's dissent were printed and widely distributed. In 1640, Henry Parker published a pamphlet entitled 'The Case of Shipmony' covering the Hampden case.

Although refusal of ship money payments grew significantly in the period following the decision, it is unclear how direct a role this case played in the tax strike. In addition to the case, rising food prices and local government focus on the bishops' wars also contributed to increased avoidance.

The Crown's raising of ship money was ultimately deemed unlawful under the Ship Money Act 1640, passed by the Long Parliament.
