= Wendover (constituency) =

Parliamentary constituency in the United Kingdom, 1801-1832

- Former borough constituency for the House of Commons

1300–1832

Wendover was a borough constituency of the House of Commons of the Parliament of England then of the Parliament of Great Britain from 1707 to 1800 and of the Parliament of the United Kingdom from 1801 to 1832. It was based on the borough of Wendover, was represented by two Members of Parliament, and was considered a classic example of a pocket borough.

== History ==
Wendover first sent members to Parliament in 1300, but after 1308, elected no burgesses for more than 300 years. However, in the 17th century a solicitor named William Hakewill, of Lincoln's Inn, rediscovered ancient writs confirming that Amersham, Great Marlow, and Wendover had all sent members to Parliament in the past, and succeeded in re-establishing their privileges (despite the opposition of James I), so that they resumed electing members from the Parliament of 1624. Hakewill himself was elected for Amersham in 1624.

The borough consisted of most of the market town of Wendover in Buckinghamshire. It was one of the smallest boroughs in England: in 1831, the population of the borough was approximately 802, and contained 171 houses. (The whole town contained 198 houses.) The right to vote was exercised by all inhabitant householders not receiving alms, which amounted to about 130 voters in 1831. Although this was a relatively large electorate for the time based on apparently democratic franchise, the borough and inhabitants were totally dependent on the Lord of the manor, who was able to exercise considerable influence and sometimes total control over the choice of MPs. In the 17th century, this patronage lay with the Hampden family, but in 1720 Richard Hampden apparently attempted to sell his interest in the borough to the government after losing £80,000 in the South Sea Bubble; what price he received for it, or whether the sale ever took place, is not recorded. By the 1750s, Wendover had passed to Earl Verney, and Namier lists his power as only being one of influence rather than total control; but by 1832 the Smith family (headed by Lord Carrington) seem to have been able to regard it as an absolutely secure pocket borough.

Wendover was abolished as a constituency by the Great Reform Act in 1832, those of its inhabitants who were qualified to vote under the new franchise doing so in the Buckinghamshire county constituency.

== Members of Parliament ==
Year	First member	Second member
1300	Thomas Niccolls	Egidius Wilson
1300	Walter de Kent	John de Sandwell
1300	Robert atte Hull	Elias de Broughton

- Constituency disenfranchised (1309)
- Constituency re-enfranchised (1624)

Year	First member	Second member
1624	John Hampden	Alexander Denton
1625	John Hampden	Richard Hampden
1626	John Hampden	Sampson Darrell
1628	John Hampden	Ralph Hawtree
April 1640	John Hampden	Bennet Hoskyns
November 1640	Robert Croke (Royalist); Disabled to sit, November 1643	Thomas Fountaine (Parliamentarian), Died 1646
1645(?)	Richard Ingoldsby	Thomas Fountaine (Parliamentarian), Died 1646
1646	Richard Ingoldsby	Thomas Harrison
Wendover was unrepresented in the Barebones Parliament and the First and Second Parliaments of the Protectorate
1659	John Baldwin	William Hampden

Year	First member	First party	Second member	Second party
1660	Richard Hampden	Whig	John Baldwin	
1661	Richard Hampden	Whig	Robert Croke	
1673	Richard Hampden	Whig	Edward Backwell	
1673	Richard Hampden	Whig	Hon. Thomas Wharton	Whig
1679	Richard Hampden	Whig	Edward Backwell	
1681	John Hampden		Edward Backwell	
1685	Richard Hampden		John Backwell	
1689	Richard Hampden		John Hampden	
1690	Richard Beke		John Backwell	
January 1701	Richard Hampden		John Backwell	
November 1701	Richard Hampden		Richard Crawley	
July 1702	Richard Hampden		Sir Roger Hill	
November 1702	Richard Hampden		Richard Crawley	
1705	Richard Hampden		Sir Roger Hill	
1708	Thomas Ellys		Sir Roger Hill	
1709	Henry Grey	Whig	Sir Roger Hill	
1713	Richard Hampden		Sir Roger Hill	
1714	James Stanhope	Whig	Sir Roger Hill	
1715	Richard Grenville		Sir Roger Hill	
1722	Richard Hampden		Sir Richard Steele	Whig
1727	Richard Hampden		The Viscount Limerick	
1728	John Hamilton		The Viscount Limerick	
1734	John Boteler		John Hampden	
1735	The Viscount Limerick		John Hampden	
1741	The Earl Verney	Tory	John Hampden	
1753	The Earl Verney	Tory	John Hampden	
1754	The Earl Verney	Tory	John Calvert	
1761	Richard Chandler-Cavendish		Verney Lovett	
1765	Richard Chandler-Cavendish		Edmund Burke	Whig
1768	Sir Robert Darling		Edmund Burke	Whig
1770	Joseph Bullock		Edmund Burke	Whig
October 1774	Joseph Bullock		John Adams	
December 1774	Joseph Bullock		Henry Drummond	
1775	Thomas Dummer		Henry Drummond	
1780	Richard Smith		John Mansell Smith	
1784	Robert Burton		John Ord	
1790	John Barker Church		Hon. Hugh Seymour-Conway	
1796	John Hiley Addington	Tory	George Canning	Tory
1802	Charles Long	Tory	John Smith	Tory
1806	Earl Stanhope	Whig	George Smith	Whig
1807	Francis Horner	Whig	George Smith	Whig
1812	Abel Smith	Tory	George Smith	Whig
1818	Robert Carrington	Whig	George Smith	Whig
1820	Samuel Smith	Tory	George Smith	Whig
1830	Samuel Smith	Tory	Abel Smith	Tory
