= Ship Money Act 1640 =

Act of the Parliament of England

Ship Money Act 1640 (Note: The citation of this act by this short title was authorised by section 5 of, and the second schedule to, the Statute Law Revision Act 1948. Due to the repeal of those provisions, it is now authorised by section 19(2) of the Interpretation Act 1978.)
- Act of Parliament
- Parliament of England
- Long title: An Act for declaring unlawfull and void the late proceedings touching Ship money and for vacating of all Records and Processe concerning the same. (Note: These words are printed against this act in the second column of the second schedule to the Statute Law Revision Act 1948, which is headed "Title".)
- Citation: 16 Cha. 1. c. 14
- Territorial extent: England and Wales

Dates
- Royal assent: 7 August 1641
- Commencement: 3 November 1640 (Note: Start of session.)
- Repealed: 1 January 1970
Other legislation
Repealed by	Statute Law Revision Act 1888; Statute Law (Repeals) Act 1969

Status: Repealed

Text of statute as originally enacted

The Ship Money Act 1640 (16 Cha. 1. c. 14) was an act of the Parliament of England. It outlawed the medieval tax called ship money, a tax the sovereign could levy (on coastal towns) without parliamentary approval. Ship money was intended for use in war, but by the 1630s was being used to fund everyday government expenses of King Charles I, thereby subverting Parliament.

== Subsequent developments ==
Section 2 of the act, from "it is" to first "aforesaid" was repealed by section 1 of, and part I of the schedule to, the Statute Law Revision Act 1888 (51 & 52 Vict. c. 3), which came into force on 27 March 1888.

The whole act, so far as unrepealed, was repealed by section 1 of, and part I of the schedule to, the Statute Law (Repeals) Act 1969, which came into force on 1 January 1970.

== See also ==
- R v Hampden (1637) 3 Howell State Trials 825
- Ship money
