= Sir Richard Atkins, 2nd Baronet =

English politician

Sir Richard Atkins, 2nd Baronet (1654–1696), of Clapham, Surrey and Tickford, Buckinghamshire, was an English politician.

He was an MP for Buckinghamshire in the period 1695 – 28 November 1696 and a baronet.

Parliament of England
Preceded by Hon. Thomas Wharton; Richard Hampden	Member of Parliament for Buckinghamshire; 1695 – Dec 1696; With: Hon. Thomas Wharton to Feb 1696; The Viscount Newhaven from Feb 1696	Succeeded by The Viscount Newhaven; Henry Neale
Baronetage of England
Preceded by Richard Atkins	Baronet (of Clapham); 1689–1696	Succeeded by Henry Atkins
