= Robert Croke (died 1671) =

English lawyer and politician

Robert Croke (c 1636 – 30 July 1671) was an English lawyer and politician who sat in the House of Commons from 1661 to 1671.

Croke was the son of Sir Robert Croke of Hampton Poyle, Oxfordshire and his wife Susanna Van Lore, daughter of Sir Peter Vanlore, 1st Baronet of Tilehurst, Berkshire. He matriculated at Queen's College, Oxford on 24 June 1653. He was a student of Inner Temple in 1655 and was called to the bar in 1661. He lived at Chequers and in 1661, he was elected Member of Parliament for Wendover in the Cavalier Parliament. He was commissioner for assessment for Buckinghamshire from 1661 to 1669, and was commissioner for loyal and indigent officers in 1662.

Croke died unmarried at the age of 35, and was buried at Ellesborough.

Parliament of England
Preceded by Richard Hampden; John Baldwin	Member of Parliament for Wendover; 1661–1671; With: Richard Hampden	Succeeded by Richard Hampden; Edward Backwell
