= John Hampden Grammar School =

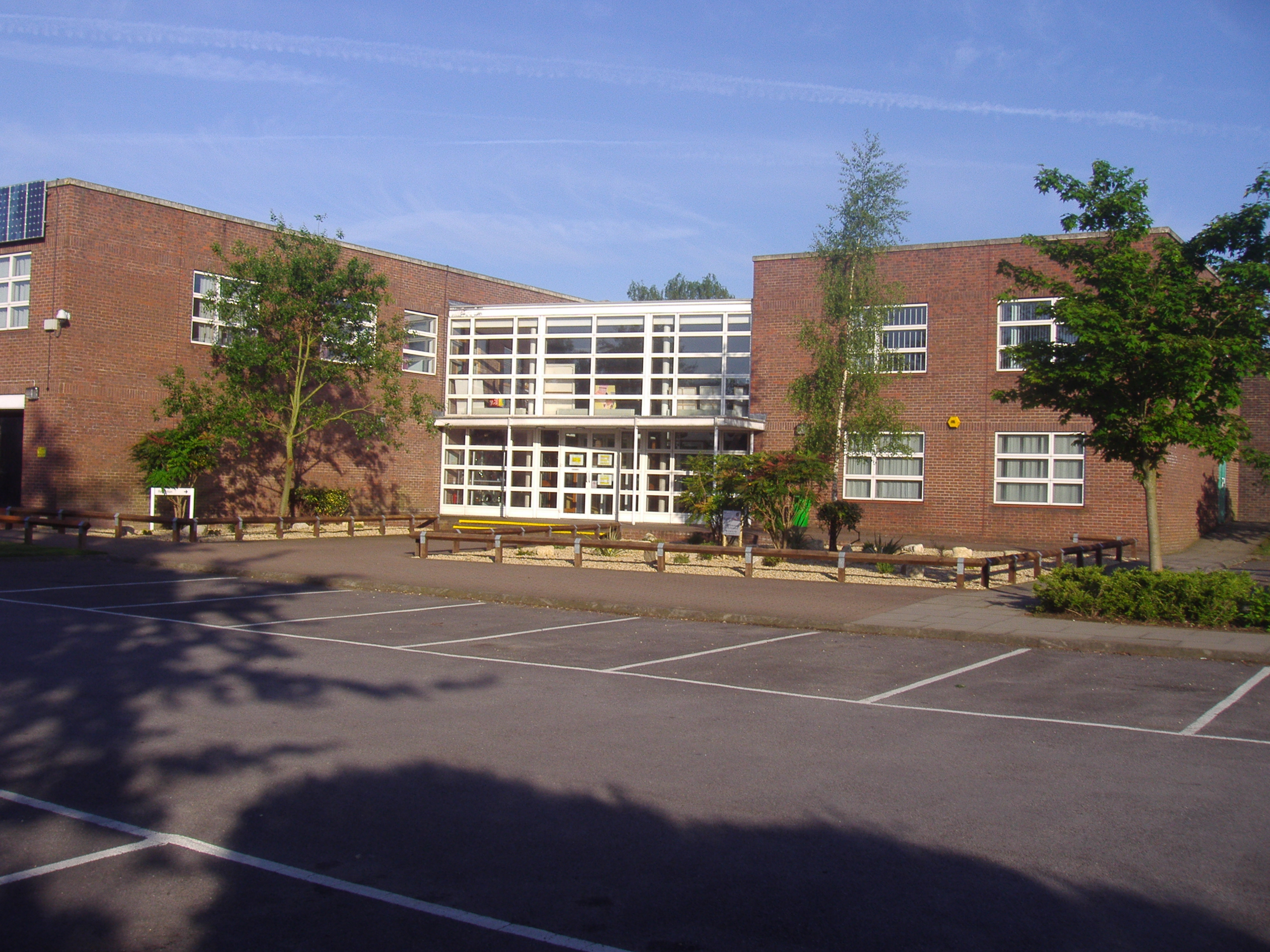
- School badge The school in 2008, before the addition of the sixth form block in 2013.

Location
- Marlow Hill; High Wycombe, Buckinghamshire, HP11 1SZ; England; 51°37′01″N 0°45′52″W

Information
- Other name: JHGS
- Type: Selective grammar school academy
- Motto: Quit Ye Like Men
- Established: 1893; 133 years ago
- Specialists: Technology College (2001); Sports College (2006); Language College (2009)
- Department for Education URN: 136771 Tables
- Ofsted: Reports
- Chairman: Peter Phippen
- Headteacher: Owen Jones
- Years offered: 7–13
- Gender: Boys
- Age range: 11–18
- Enrolment: 1081
- Capacity: 1150
- Houses: Brunel; Carrington; Kelvin; Ramsay; Sheraton; Wren
- Colour
- Former pupils: People educated at John Hampden Grammar School
- Website: www.jhgs.bucks.sch.uk

John Hampden Grammar School (known colloquially as "JHGS") is a 7–13 boys' selective state grammar school in High Wycombe, Buckinghamshire, England. It is named after the local member of parliament and English Civil War commander John Hampden. In June 2011, the school became an Academy.

Established as the Schools of Science and Art in 1893, it is situated on Marlow Hill to the south of the town and has a capacity of about 1,150 boys aged between 11 and 18.

== History ==
=== Early origins ===
In the early 1890s a fund was set up to raise money for an art and technical school in High Wycombe to help support the traditional skills in the town of cabinet making, carving and polishing. Early donations to the fund included a grant of £575 from the School of Art in Kensington Gardens and a further donation from Buckinghamshire County Council's education fund which had benefited from proceeds derived from an unpopular tax imposed on wines and spirits. To make up the shortfall needed to pay for the building the schools' trustees and general committee ran a three-day fair in the grounds of Wycombe Abbey, the home of the then Lord Carrington. The fête took place in July 1892, with Lady Carrington arriving by a special train from Paddington. The Great Western Railway also ran excursions from Maidenhead, Thame, Aylesbury and Chinnor and the revelries were led by the band of the 17th Lancers. By the end of the event the committee had raised £800.

The school was originally built on 530 square yards of land in Frogmore Gardens (now known as 'Frogmoor' or 'Frogmore') purchased from Lord Carrington for £325. The building work cost £1,964 and when the school opened there was still a shortfall of £230, some of which was met by a further bazaar. The original building was designed by Arthur Vernon who also designed the RGS building and was the first man to own a car in High Wycombe. In 1901 the trustees allowed girls to be taught in separate classes and teachers and this arrangement continued until 1906 when the girls moved to buildings in Benjamin Road, ultimately becoming Wycombe High School. Courses were run at the school at all times of the day but most were in the evenings and weekends so that pupils could also work in the local furniture trade.

=== Technical Institute ===
Soon after the Schools of Science and Art opened the Frogmoor building, it became clear it was too small and a new site was discussed. In 1915 the Royal Grammar School moved to new buildings on Amersham Hill and it was suggested that the school (now usually referred to as Chepping Wycombe Science and Art Schools and Technical Institute) moved into the now vacated buildings in Easton Street (also designed by Arthur Vernon). Unfortunately the outbreak of the First World War meant that the Wycombe High School buildings were needed as a hospital so the girls moved into Easton Street and the boys had to wait. The Institute finally moved to Easton Street in 1919 and soon there was a significant expansion. Firstly the 1918 Education Act raised the school leaving age to 14 and it was decided to set up a Junior Day Technical School as part of the institute. This would be a full-time school. At the same time the Institute set up a training school for ex-soldiers and sailors who had become disabled in the war to prepare them for the furniture trade. The Easton Street buildings also soon proved too small and were significantly expanded and a series of wooden huts were installed to be used as classrooms. The Frogmoor school continued to be used after the move to Easton Street and was finally sold in 1928 (for £3,500). It has since been used for a number of different purposes including a swimming pool and is now a dentist's practice.

In 1920, the Day School opened and technical classes in metalwork and woodwork were introduced – the first in the country. The schools changed their names to Wycombe Technical Institute and tuition was offered in most subjects (except French). Although the School of Art continued to be part of the Institute it was often considered a separate entity and it moved to Amersham in 1973 becoming part of Amersham and Wycombe College. In 1927 land was rented from Lord Carrington to become the school's playing fields – until then the boys had used the Rye for sports fixtures. The boys had to change in an open fronted pavilion – close to where the present one is located – and the girls had to change behind the large roller. The school motto Quit Ye Like Men, adapted from 1 Corinthians 16:13, was adopted in 1924. It remained the motto even during the co-ed period – girls were admitted in 1925 mainly to study commercial subjects.

Following the introduction of the Education Act 1944, the Institute became the town's new technical school taking children at 11 and 13 plus. In 1946 it was decided to split the school and college although both still operated in the same building. By 1954, the combined school and further education centre had become vastly over-subscribed and unwieldy. Consequently, the High Wycombe College of Further Education was set up on its present site (now Bucks New University) although the final separation of pupils did not come about until 1963. In 1956 the girls transferred to the old Wycombe High School buildings in Benjamin Road to form Lady Verney High School.

=== Contemporary history ===
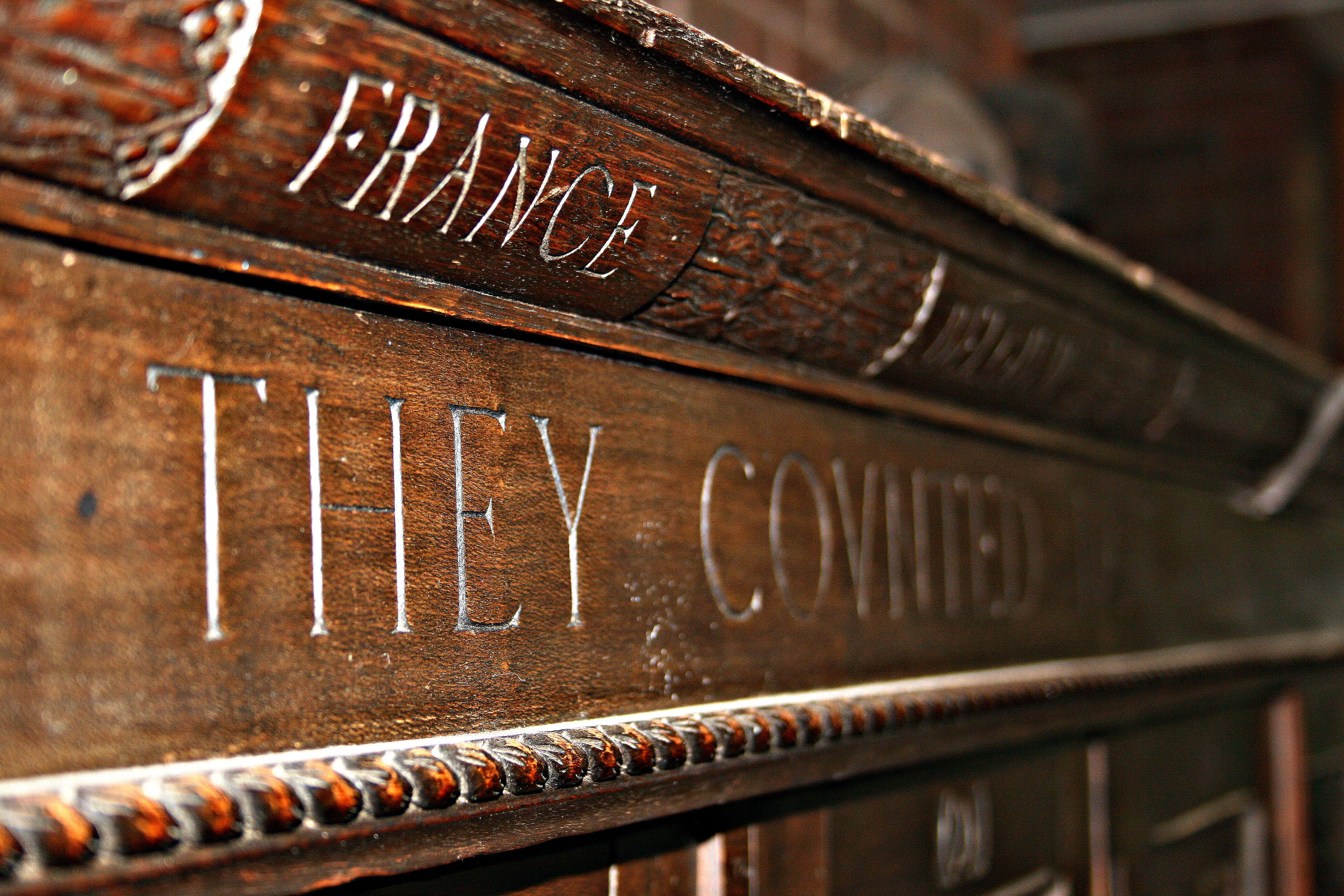
Carved set of 12 lockers, saved from a bonfire.

The boys remained at Easton Street as Wycombe Technical High School for a further 10 years before moving to the present site, the school playing fields at the top of Marlow Hill in 1966. Most of the valuable historic reminders of the early days of the Technical Institute ended up on a bonfire in the massive clearing out operation when the school moved to Marlow Hill. The only exceptions to this were the headmaster's chair, the headmaster's table, engraved with the school motto, and a carved set of 12 lockers. The lockers were designed in 1919 by Mr Shaw Wilson, head of the wood carving department and created by wounded soldiers who had returned from the war. Inscribed on the cornice are the words "They counted not their lives dear unto themselves."

The name was changed to John Hampden School in 1970 and John Hampden Grammar School in 1984. More recent developments gave the school a new façade in September 1995 and the following January work was completed on a sixth-form block to provide specialist teaching rooms, private study rooms, a common room and a new library. In 2002, funding from the Wolfson Foundation allowed a new language teaching facility and science laboratory to be opened.

In 2006 a new classroom block, used mainly for mathematics teaching, and a sports hall were opened by former Arsenal goalkeeper Bob Wilson. This in turn allowed for an extension of the music department and development of a music studio.

On 4 November 2010, a gas explosion occurred in the caretaker's house on the premises. In the incident, the school's caretaker was airlifted to hospital with serious burns and the school evacuated. After the explosion the school raised money for the caretaker in his recovery by means of a Mufti Day where pupils came to school in their own clothes as opposed to the standard uniform.

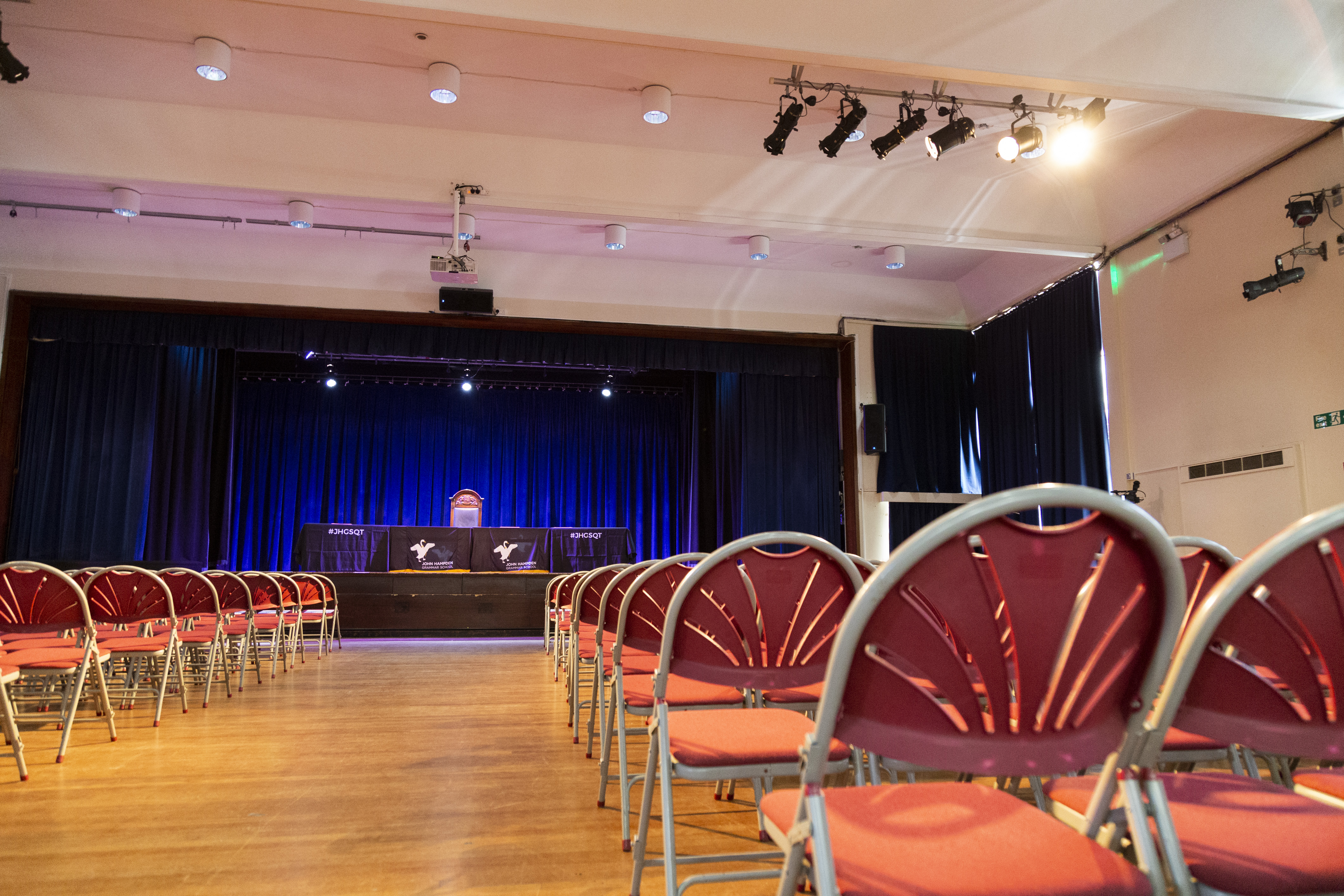
The Main Hall at the school

On 1 June 2011 Michael Gove, the Secretary of State for Education, approved the school's application to become an Academy. Also in 2011, a food technology room was opened, following a successful planning application the previous year. A proposal was made to relocate a Synthetic Turf Pitch, which was at the time located at the Handy Cross leisure centre, to the JHGS site as part of a wider redevelopment of the leisure centre. Construction work was underway as of October 2013, and was in use by late January 2014.

In 2013, an extension to the Sixth Form block incorporating a new library was built. In May 2019, a planning application was submitted for the construction of a new three storey classroom block on the front of the site. The project was initially announced in December 2018, when the school received around £3m of funding from the Department for Education's selective school expansion fund, which proved controversial. The new building, named the "Innovation Hub", was opened in October 2021 by football executives David Dein and Karren Brady.

== Headteachers ==
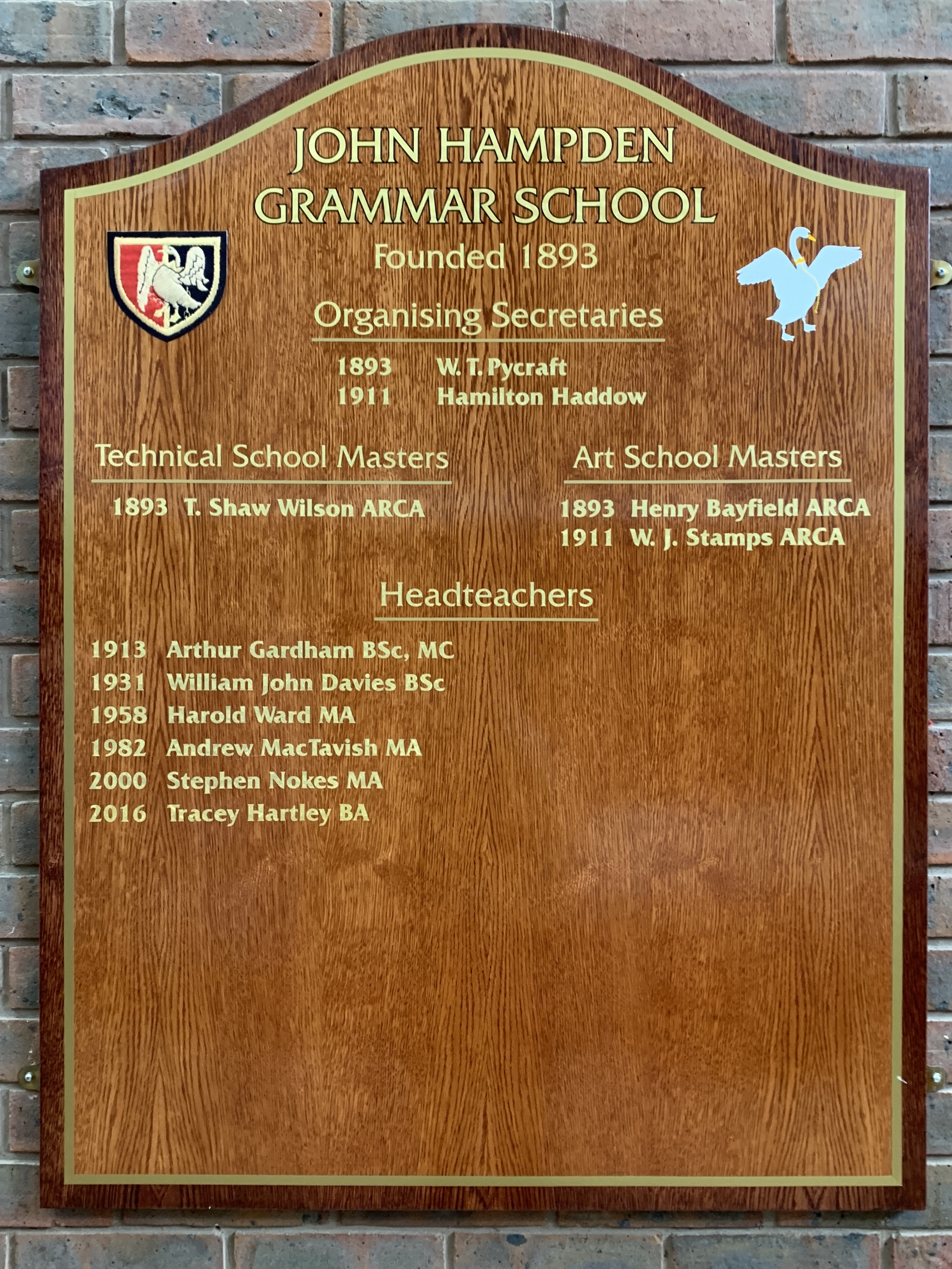
A plaque inside the school details the leadership since 1893, excluding Owen Jones

There have only been seven headteachers in the history of the school. The management of the original schools was vested in the trustees who in turn entrusted day-to-day control to art masters Henry Bayfield and Shaw Wilson and the Education Committee secretary WT Pycraft. The secretary was replaced by Hamilton Haddow and in 1913 by Arthur Gardham. W. J. Stamps took over from Bayfield in 1911 and he ultimately became Headmaster of the School of Art. The first headmaster (known in 1920 as Principal) of the Technical School was Arthur Gardham who joined in 1913 and won the MC with the Royal Garrison Artillery during the First World War. The former army captain is remembered by old boys as a determined character who liked to get his own way. As a result of his wartime injuries he always carried a walking stick. He would hold a daily roll call on the Fives Court when he inspected hair, shoes and general tidiness.

After the sudden death in post of Gardham at the age of 51, the governors appointed William John Davies (1893-1977). As the split between the School and College started in 1946, Davies was both principal of the college and headmaster of the school. When Davies was due to retire his job was split; the college job going to Desmond Everett (in 1960) and Harold Ward becoming headmaster (in 1958). He retired in 1982 and was replaced by Andrew MacTavish. MacTavish retired in July 2000 and was replaced by Stephen Nokes. Nokes retired in July 2016, replaced by Tracey Hartley in September 2016, the school's first woman headteacher. Owen Jones took over from Tracey Hartley in September 2026, having previously been headteacher at Northampton Academy.

=== List of headteachers ===
- Arthur Gardham (1920–1931)
- William John Davies (1931–1958)
- Harold Ward (1958–1982)
- Andrew MacTavish (1982–2000)
- Stephen Nokes (2000–2016)
- Tracey Hartley (2016–2026)
- Owen Jones (2026–2026)

== Sport ==
The school offers 19 different sports from football, hockey and rugby through to squash and Rock-it-Ball. It also runs international cricket, football, hockey, squash, and rugby tours.

In 1986 the under 18 football team won the ESFA trophy and were runners up in 1992. In 2008, the Year 9, under 14 football team won the ESFA Under 14 Schools' Cup again, beating Lancaster School from Leicester at Huish Park, the home of National League side Yeovil Town.

In 2026 the cricket team reached the final of the inaugural Barclays Knight-Stokes Cup at Lord's Cricket Ground. They were beaten by Altrincham Grammar School.

== Appearances in the media ==
A section of BBC Radio 4's In Our Time was recorded at the school. In 2008, it featured in a BBC Radio 4 programme about the 11+ examination and social selection.

In May 2010, the school featured in Channel 4's Heston's Feasts – presented by Heston Blumenthal, a former pupil at the school. In the programme the chef cooked spam fritters with members of the school's kitchen staff.

== Notable alumni ==
- Heston Blumenthal OBE, chef
- Simon Burnett, swimmer
- Nicholas Catlin, hockey player for Royal Beerschot THC
- Kenton Cool, mountain guide
- Giles Cooper OBE, entertainment producer and promoter, chairman of the annual Royal Variety Performance
- Robin Day OBE, furniture designer best known for his injection-moulded polypropylene stacking chair
- Otto Decker, German/American football player who came to England as part of the Kindertransport
- Michael Fox, actor best known for playing Andy on Downton Abbey
- Matt Ingram, goalkeeper at Hull City, formerly at Wycombe Wanderers
- Kevin Keen, former professional footballer and manager, author
- Peter Keen CBE, cycling coach, former coach of Chris Boardman, Performance Director for British Cycling and UK Sport
- Terry Pratchett OBE, author
- Edward Savage, actor and footballer
- David Shayler, member of MI5 prosecuted under the Official Secrets Act 1989
- Ben Sneesby, Paralympic alpine skier
- Alex Sobel, Member of Parliament for Leeds North West
- Roger Varian, thoroughbred racehorse trainer
- Simon Wigg, speedway rider and five-time world longtrack champion
