= Sir William Bowyer, 1st Baronet =

English politician

- Born: 29 June 1612
- Died: 2 October 1679 (aged 67)
- Education: Jesus College, Cambridge
- Occupations: Politician, nobleman and lawyer
- Spouse: Margaret Weld
- Children: Three sons, including William Bowyer, and several daughters
- Parent(s): Sir Henry Bower; Anne Salter

Sir William Bowyer, 1st Baronet (29 June 1612 – 2 October 1679), was an English politician who sat in the House of Commons between 1659 and 1679.

Bowyer was the eldest son of Sir Henry Bowyer and his wife Anne Salter, daughter of Sir Nicholas Salter, and was baptised at St Olave's Church, Hart Street, London. Sir Henry Bowyer died in December 1613, after rehearsals for The Somerset Masque.

He was educated at Jesus College, Cambridge. In 1630, he was called to the bar by Lincoln's Inn. Bowyer was High Sheriff of Buckinghamshire between 1646 and 1647 and a Member of Parliament (MP) for Buckinghamshire from 1659 until 1679. Having been a Royalist before the Restoration, he was knighted by June 1660, and afterwards made a Baronet, of Denham, in the County of Buckingham by King Charles II of England on 25 June 1660.

On 29 May 1634, he married Margaret Weld, daughter of Sir John Weld, at St Olave's Church, Old Jewry, London. They had three sons and several daughters. Bowyer died intestate, aged 67, and was buried at Denham. He was succeeded in the baronetcy by his oldest son William.

Parliament of England
Preceded by Richard Greenville; Sir William Bowyer, 1st Baronet	Member of Parliament for Buckinghamshire; 1660–1679; With: Thomas Tyrrell 1660; William Tyringham 1660–1679	Succeeded by Hon. Thomas Wharton; John Hampden
Baronetage of England
New creation	Baronet of Denham; 1660–1679	Succeeded by William Bowyer
