= William Tyringham =

English politician

Sir William Tyringham
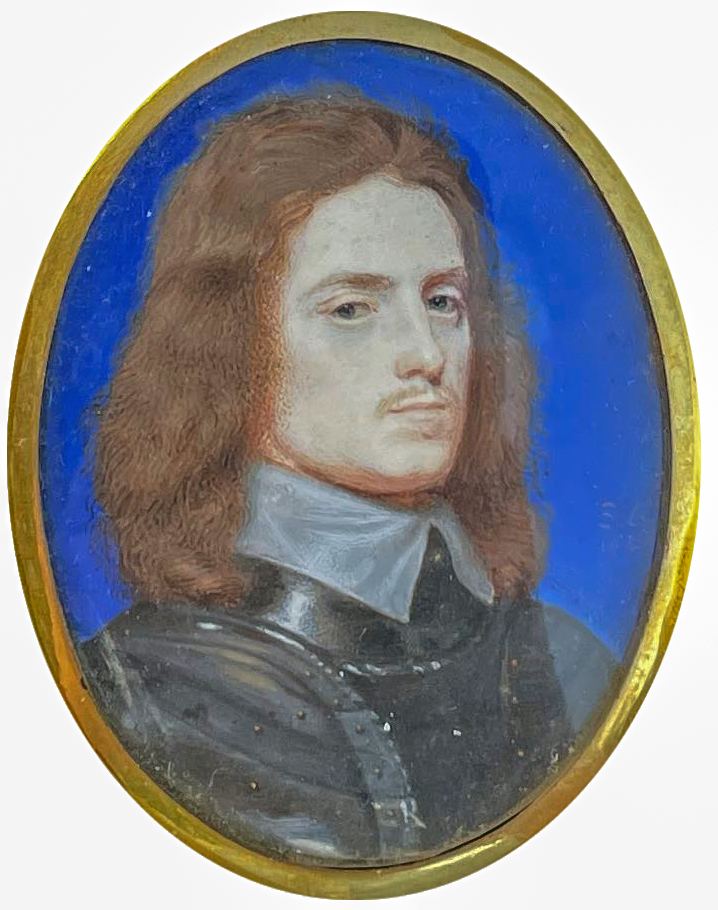
- Portrait by Samuel Cooper (painter), 1647

Personal details
- Political party: Royalist

Sir William Tyringham (1618–1685) was an English politician who sat in the House of Commons from 1660 to 1679. He fought in the Royalist army in the English Civil War.

== Family and education ==
Tyringham was the son of Sir Thomas Tyringham of Tyringham, Buckinghamshire and his wife Frances Gorges, daughter of Sir Thomas Gorges of Longford Castle, Wiltshire. He was baptised on 12 October 1618. He matriculated at Exeter College, Oxford on 19 June 1635, aged 17 and was a student of Inner Temple in 1637. His father died in 1637.

== Military and political careers ==
He became a cornet in the army in 1640 and was a captain in the Royalist army in 1643. He succeeded to the estate at Tyringham, which was encumbered with mortgages amounting to £20,000, on the death of his brother in 1645. By 1646 he was a colonel and in that year he petitioned to compound for his delinquency. He was fined £100 and a further £891 was imposed on his late brother, was the sums were not paid until 1651. In 1658, he was suspected of royalist conspiracy and was arrested but was released soon after. He would have commanded the Buckinghamshire rising in 1659 if the Royalists had acted but was arrested again in August 1659.

In 1660, Tyringham was elected Member of Parliament for Buckinghamshire in a by-election to the Convention Parliament. He became a J.P. for Buckinghamshire in July 1660, a Deputy Lieutenant in August 1660 and commissioner for assessment for Buckinghamshire in September 1660. He was created Knight of the Bath on 23 April 1661. In 1661 he was re-elected MP for Buckinghamshire in the Cavalier Parliament. He was commissioner for loyal and indigent officers for Buckinghamshire in 1662 and commissioner for corporations from 1662 to 1663. From 1663 to 1674 he was commissioner for assessment for Surrey. Between 1663 and 1679 he held positions relating to the Bedford Level, being bailiff from 1663 to 1665, conservator from 1665 to 1667, bailiff again from 1667 to 1669 and conservator again from 1669 to 1679. He was a gentleman of the privy chamber from 1668 to 1685. He was commissioner for recusants for Buckinghamshire in 1675 and commissioner for assessment for Surrey from 1679 to 1680.

Tyringham died at the age of about 66 and was buried at Tyringham on 6 August 1685.

== Personal life ==
Tyringham married firstly Elizabeth Winchcombe, widow of Henry Winchcombe of Bucklebury, Berkshire and daughter of George Miller of Swallowfield, Berkshire. They had two daughter. He married again by 1655, Sarah Martin, widow of James Martin, Fishmonger, of London and Putney, Surrey, and had a daughter. His wife died in 1679.

Parliament of England
Preceded by Sir William Bowyer, 1st Baronet; Thomas Tyrrell	Member of Parliament for Buckinghamshire; 1660–1679; With: Sir William Bowyer, 1st Baronet	Succeeded by Hon. Thomas Wharton; John Hampden
