= William Hampden (1633–1675) =

English politician (1633–1675)

William Hampden (1633–1675) was an English politician who was member of the Parliament of England for the constituencies of Buckinghamshire and Wendover.

== Family ==
Hampden was the son of John Hampden.

== See also ==
- List of MPs elected to the English parliament in 1656
