= Ship money =

Tax in medieval England

Ship money was a tax of medieval origin levied intermittently in the Kingdom of England until the middle of the 17th century. Assessed typically on the inhabitants of coastal areas of England, it was one of several taxes that English monarchs could levy by prerogative without the approval of Parliament. Elizabeth I levied this tax to pay for a navy. The attempt of Charles I of England from 1634 to levy ship money during peacetime and extend it to the inland counties of England, without parliamentary approval, provoked fierce resistance and was one of the grievances of the English propertied class before the English Civil War.

== Traditional practice ==
The Plantagenet kings of England had exercised the right of requiring the maritime towns and counties to furnish ships in time of war, and this duty was sometimes commuted for a money payment. Although several statutes of Edward I and Edward III, notably their confirmations of Magna Carta, had made it illegal for the Crown to exact any taxes without the consent of Parliament, the prerogative of levying ship money in time of war had never fallen wholly into abeyance. In 1619, James I aroused no popular opposition by levying £40,000 (equivalent to $9,344,675 in 2025) of ship money on London and £8,550 on other seaport towns.

== Opposition ==
Petition of Right
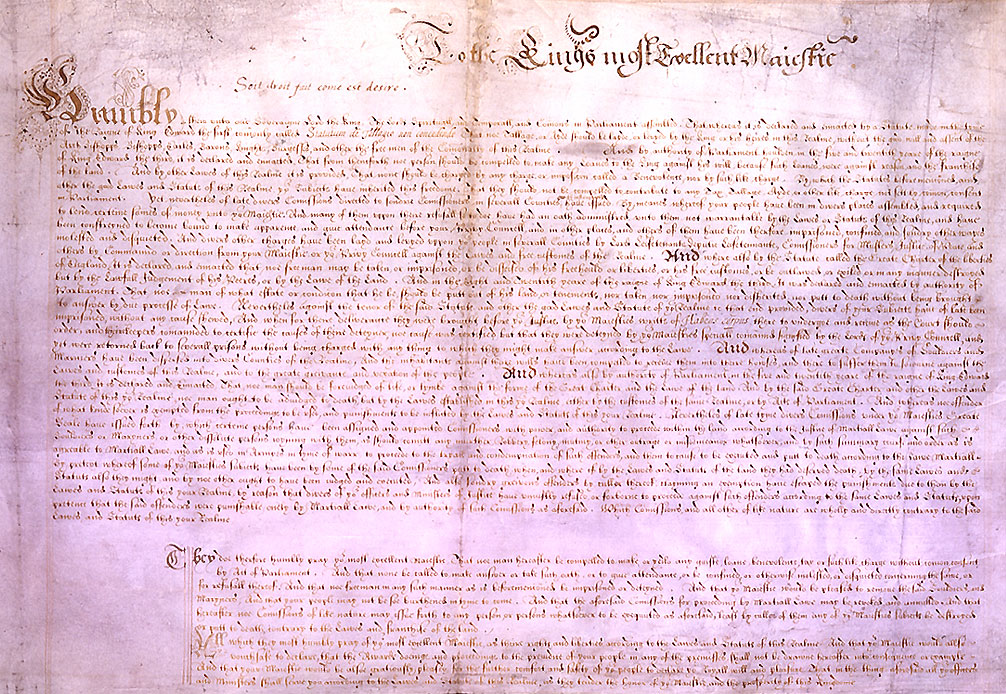
- The Petition of Right
- Created: 8 May 1628
- Ratified: 7 June 1628
- Location: Parliamentary Archives, London
- Author: Sir Edward Coke
- Purpose: The protection of civil liberties

Full text
- Petition of Right at Wikisource

In 1628, Charles I, having prorogued Parliament in early summer and after his assent to the Petition of Right, proceeded to levy ship money on every county in England without Parliament, issuing writs requiring £173,000 to be returned to the exchequer. This was the first occasion when the demand for ship-money aroused serious opposition, in view of the declaration in the petition that

[Y]our subjects have inherited this freedom, that they should not be compelled to contribute to any tax, tallage, aid, or other like charge not set by common consent, in parliament.

Charles' requests to sheriffs were rejected by the overburdened inland populations; Lord Northampton, Lord-Lieutenant of Warwickshire, and the Earl of Banbury in Berkshire, refused to assist in collecting the money; and Charles withdrew the writs.

In 1634, Charles made a secret treaty with Philip IV of Spain to assist him against the Dutch. To raise funds for this, William Noy, the Attorney-General, suggested that further resort should be had to ship money. Noy investigated such legal learning as there was in support of the demand, and unearthed old records of ship money in the Tower of London; some historians, such as Henry Hallam, have seen Noy's findings as evidence that, before Charles' use of it, the tax had been dormant for centuries.

The King obtained an opinion affirming the legality of the writ from the Lord Keeper Thomas Coventry and the Earl of Manchester, whereupon the writ was issued in October 1634 and directed to the justices of London and other seaports, requiring them to provide a certain number of ships of war of a prescribed tonnage and equipment, or their equivalent in money, and empowering them to assess the inhabitants for payment of the tax, according to their substance.

=== Three writs ===
The distinctive feature of the writ of 1634 was that it was issued, contrary to all precedent, in time of peace. Charles desired to conceal the true aim of his policy, which he knew would be detested by the country, and he accordingly gave as a pretext for the impost the danger to commerce from pirates, and the Thirty Years' War in Europe.

The citizens of London immediately claimed exemption under their charter, while other towns argued as to the amount of their assessment; but no resistance on constitutional grounds appears to have been offered, and £104,000 was collected.

On 9 October 1635, a second writ of ship money was issued, directed to the sheriffs and justices of inland as well as of maritime counties and towns, as in the revoked writ of 1628. A sum of £208,000 was demanded, to be obtained by assessment on personal as well as real property, payment to be enforced by distraint.

This demand gave rise to popular discontent, which now began to see a determination on the part of the king to dispense altogether with parliamentary government. Charles responded with a written opinion, signed by ten out of twelve judges consulted, to the effect that in time of national danger, of which the Crown was the sole judge, ship money might legally be levied on all parts of the country by writ under the Great Seal.

The issue of a third writ of ship money on 9 October 1636 made it evident that the ancient restrictions that limited the levying of the tax to the maritime parts of the kingdom and to times of war (or national danger) had been finally swept away, and the king intended to convert it into a permanent and general form of taxation without parliamentary sanction. The judges again, at Charles's request, gave an opinion favourable to the prerogative, which was read by Lord Coventry in the Star Chamber and by the judges on assize.

=== Refusal, then repeal ===
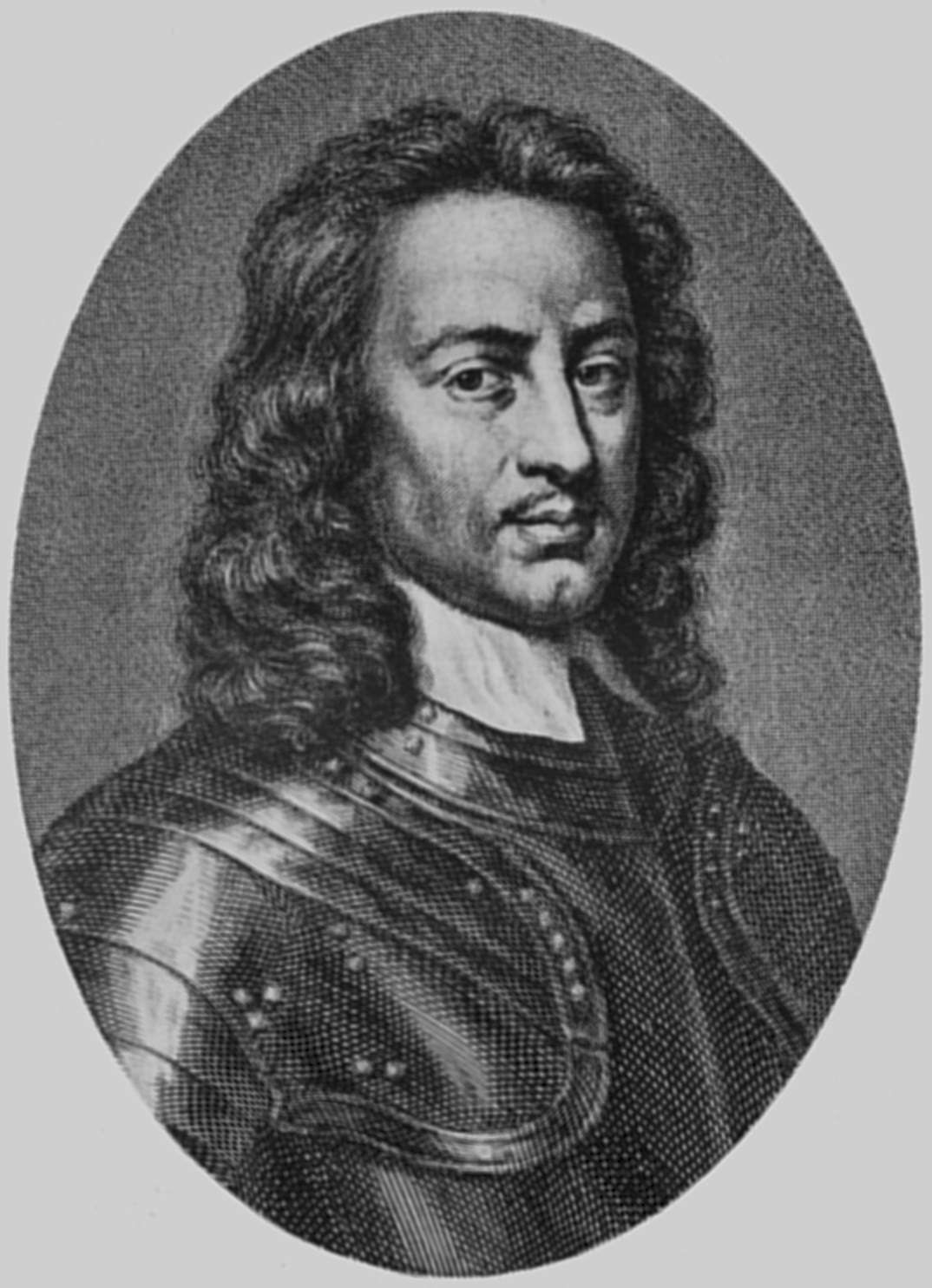
John Hampden

Ship money enabled Charles to meet peacetime government expenditures in the 1630s. Payment was refused by John Hampden, a wealthy Buckinghamshire gentleman landowner. The case against the latter (R v Hampden) was finally heard before all 12 judges in the Court of Exchequer Chamber in 1637, after Denham had expressed his doubts to Davenport, who was wary of the four-judge panel which would have sat in a less unusual case. Hampden was defended by Oliver St John and Robert Holborne. The Solicitor-General, Sir Edward Littleton, and the Attorney-General, Sir John Bankes, prosecuted. Hampden's lawyers argued that the taxation was the king going around Parliament and attempting to squeeze money from the people of England, while defenders of the king suggested that these taxes were necessary for the defense and safety of England. Hampden lost the case, seven judges to five:

- For the King:
  - Sir Richard Weston
  - Sir Francis Crawley
  - Sir Robert Berkley
  - Sir George Vernon
  - Sir Thomas Trevor
  - Sir William Jones
  - Sir John Finch
- For Hampden:
  - Sir George Crooke
  - Sir Richard Hutton
  - Sir John Denham
  - Sir John Brampston
  - Sir Humphrey Davenport

== Aftermath ==
Despite the trial case being won by Charles, the opposition to ship money continued. In 1640, a group of citizens of London petitioned Charles and at the top of their list of grievances was the tax

The pressing and unusual Impositions upon Merchandize, Importing and Exporting, and the urging and Levying of Ship-money, notwithstanding both which, Merchants Ships and Goods have been taken and destroyed both by Turkish and other Pirates.

The narrowness of the case encouraged others to refuse the tax. By 1639, less than 20 per cent of the money demanded had been raised. As matters deteriorated in England and Scotland starting with the Bishops' War, ship money proved to be insufficient to finance the king's military needs, partly because of the extra imposition of coat and conduct money to pay for the army. It was later stopped by the Long Parliament when they voted the Ship Money Act 1640 (16 Cha. 1. c. 14). Hampden went on to Parliamentary and Civil War leadership, only to die early on at the Battle of Chalgrove Field. Fifty years later, in the aftermath of the Glorious Revolution, the Bill of Rights 1689 prohibited all forms of extra-parliamentary taxation.
