= Richard Beke =

English politician

Richard Beke (1630–1707), of Westminster and Ford, Dinton, Buckinghamshire, was an English politician.

He was a Member (MP) for Elgin and Nairn in 1656, for Amersham on 8 February 1659, for Aylesbury in 1689 and for Wendover in 1690, 1695 and 1698.

== Biography ==
Richard Beke was son of Henry Beke (who was sheriff (20th King Charles I) and also one of the parliament committee for the same county), and Frances, daughter of John Billyard, Merchant Taylor, of London.

It is likely that Major Richard Beke either had an estate in Yorkshire, or some military appointment in that part of the kingdom, as he was named a visitor of the college erected by the protector Oliver Cromwell, at Durham. The Lord Protector Richard Cromwell had a great regard for Richard Beke, giving him the command of his life-guard, and knighting him.

At the Restoration he was briefly in favour, and was a colonel in the army. Later he was in the commission of the peace, and also a commissioner of appeals: he represented Aylesbury once, in 1689, and Wendover twice in the parliaments of King William and Mary.

He died 29 November 1707, aged 78, and was buried in the church of Dinton, in Buckinghamshire, in which parish he had a seat.

== Family ==
On 7 February 1656 Richard Beke married Levina, the daughter of Roger Whitstone and Catherine sister of the Lord Protector Oliver Cromwell. The wedding was a grand occasion attended by the extended Cromwell family including the Lord Protector.

On 1 July 1667, Beke married Jane, daughter of Lord Charles Powlett of Abbott's Anne, Hampshire.

Beke married his third wife, Elizabeth the third daughter of Sir Thomas Lee, of Hartwell, in Bucks on 10 February 1684. She died 20 May 1737, aged 74 years, and is also buried in Dinton church, Beke and Elizabeth had three daughters:

- Ann, who married to Mark Antonie.
- Elizabeth, who died young.
- Mary, who married to John Baynes serjeant-at-law.
