= John Hampden =

English politician and military officer (1595–1643)

John Hampden MP
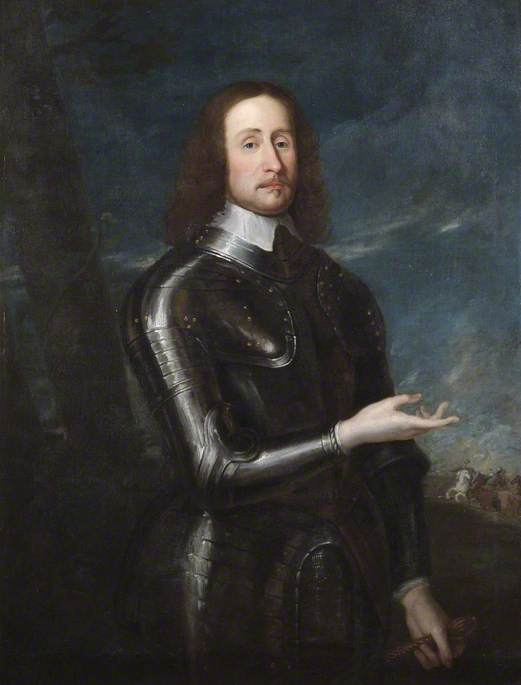
- Portrait possibly of Hampden

Committee of Safety
- In office July 1642 – June 1643

Member of Parliament for Buckinghamshire
- In office April 1640 – December 1643

Member of Parliament for Wendover
- In office 1624–1629

Member of Parliament for Grampound
- In office 1621–1622

Personal details
- Born: c. June 1595 London, England
- Died: 24 June 1643 (aged 48) Thame, Oxfordshire
- Resting place: Great Hampden
- Spouse(s): Elizabeth Symeon (1619–1631); Letitia Knollys (1640–1643)
- Relations: Oliver Cromwell
- Children: 7, including William and Richard
- Parent(s): William Hampden; Elizabeth Cromwell
- Education: Magdalen College, Oxford
- Occupation: Politician, military officer

Military service
- Years of service: 1642–43
- Rank: Colonel
- Unit: Hampden’s Regiment of Foot
- Battles/wars: First English Civil War; Battle of Edgehill; Battle of Aylesbury; Battle of Brentford; Siege of Reading; Battle of Chalgrove Field (DOW)

John Hampden (c. June 1595 – 24 June 1643) was an English politician from Oxfordshire, who was killed fighting for Parliament in the First English Civil War. An ally of John Pym, and cousin of Oliver Cromwell, he was one of the Five Members whom Charles I of England tried to arrest in January 1642, a significant step in the outbreak of fighting in August. All five are commemorated at the State Opening of Parliament each year.

When the war began in August 1642, Hampden raised an infantry regiment for Parliament. His death on 18 June 1643 after the Battle of Chalgrove Field was considered a significant loss, but meant he avoided the later ideological splits that led to the execution of Charles I in January 1649, and establishment of the Commonwealth of England.

Combined with his reputation as an honest, principled, and patriotic opposer of arbitrary rule, this led to the erection of his statue in the rebuilt Palace of Westminster in 1841, representing the Parliamentarian cause. (Note: The Royalist chosen was another moderate, Viscount Falkland, killed at Newbury three months later.) Prior to the American Revolution, Benjamin Franklin and John Adams were among those who referenced him to justify their cause.

== Personal details ==
John Hampden was born around June 1595, probably in London, eldest son of William Hampden (1570–1597), and Elizabeth Cromwell (1574–1664). The family were long-established in Buckinghamshire, and William was Member of Parliament for East Looe in 1593. After the death of his father in April 1597, his cousin, another William Hampden, was appointed executor but became involved in a bitter legal dispute with Elizabeth; John's younger brother, Richard (1596–1659), inherited his estates at Emmington.

Hampden married Elizabeth Symeon in 1619, and they had nine children together prior to her death in 1631, of whom seven survived into adulthood: Ann (1616–1701), Elizabeth (1619–1643), John (1621–1642), William (died 1675), Ruth (1628–1687), Mary (1630–1689), and Richard (1631–1695), Chancellor of the Exchequer under William III. In 1640, he married Letitia Knollys (1591–1666); they had no children before he died in 1643.

== Career ==
=== 1610 to 1629; Political activism ===
Hampden graduated from Magdalen College, Oxford in 1610, and attended the Inner Temple from 1613 to 1615, not necessarily to become a lawyer, but because knowledge of the law was then considered part of a gentleman's education. While studying in London, he became involved with other Puritans, a general term for anyone who wanted to 'purify' the Church of England by removing what they considered to be Catholic practices. Members belonged to a variety of Protestant sects, the most prominent being Presbyterians like Hampden, connecting him to a network that included Richard Knightley, Lord Saye, and John Preston.

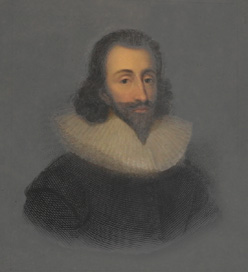
Sir John Eliot, who died in prison in 1632; Hampden helped him organise the 1628 campaign for the Petition of Right

In 1621, he became MP for Grampound, a rotten borough in Cornwall controlled by the local magnate, John Arundell; a good example of the complexity of the period, Arundell opposed ship money in the 1630s, but during the First English Civil War held Pendennis Castle for Charles I. Hampden subsequently financed a successful campaign to restore parliamentary representation to Wendover in 1624, a seat he held until 1629. As MP for Wendover in 1626, he sat in the so-called "Useless Parliament", known as such for failing to pass any legislation. In return for approving taxes, Parliament demanded the impeachment of the Duke of Buckingham, a close friend of the king, and a military commander notorious for inefficiency and extravagance.

Rather than comply, Charles dissolved it and resorted to raising money through forced loans, with over 70 individuals jailed for refusing to pay, including Hampden's uncle, Sir Edmund Hampden. When Hampden also declined to subscribe, he was arrested, and while in prison met Sir John Eliot, a leading member of the Parliamentary opposition. When the "loans" failed to produce sufficient income, Charles was forced to call new elections in March 1627, which returned "a preponderance of MPs opposed to the King", including Hampden, John Selden, Edward Coke, John Pym and a young Oliver Cromwell.

Released to attend the new Parliament, Hampden collaborated with Eliot and others in efforts to limit Royal power. (Note: Many MPs viewed Stuart doctrines such as the Divine right of kings as "innovations" imposed by James I on England, and argued they were simply restoring the position to that prevailing pre-1603.) The most significant was the June 1628 Petition of Right, which opened the way to a new impeachment of Buckingham, a campaign that ended after he was assassinated in August 1628 by a disgruntled soldier. The next issue was that of Roger Maynwaring and Robert Sibthorpe, two priests who published sermons supportive of the divine right of kings, passive obedience, and which implied Charles was entitled to raise taxes as he wished.

In the 17th century, many believed 'good government' and 'true religion' were closely linked, and alterations in one implied alterations in the other. (Note: Summarised by Hampden in the debate on the Petition of Right; "Here is 1, an innovation of religion suspected; is it not high time to take it to heart and acquaint his Majesty? 2ly, alteration of government; can you forbear when it goes no less than the subversion of the whole state? 3ly, hemmed in with enemies; is it now a time to be silent, and not to show to his Majesty that a man that has so much power uses none of it to help us? If he be no papist, papists are friends and kindred to him.") Using divine right to justify the levying of taxes without the approval of Parliament was inflammatory enough in itself, but Maynwaring also claimed those who disobeyed the king risked eternal damnation, infuriating Puritans who generally believed in predestination, and salvation through faith. His suggestion 'kings were gods' was also regarded as blasphemy. Censured for preaching against the established constitution, the two men were later pardoned by Charles, who dismissed Parliament in 1629, and instituted eleven years of Personal Rule.

=== 1630 to 1639; Ship money ===
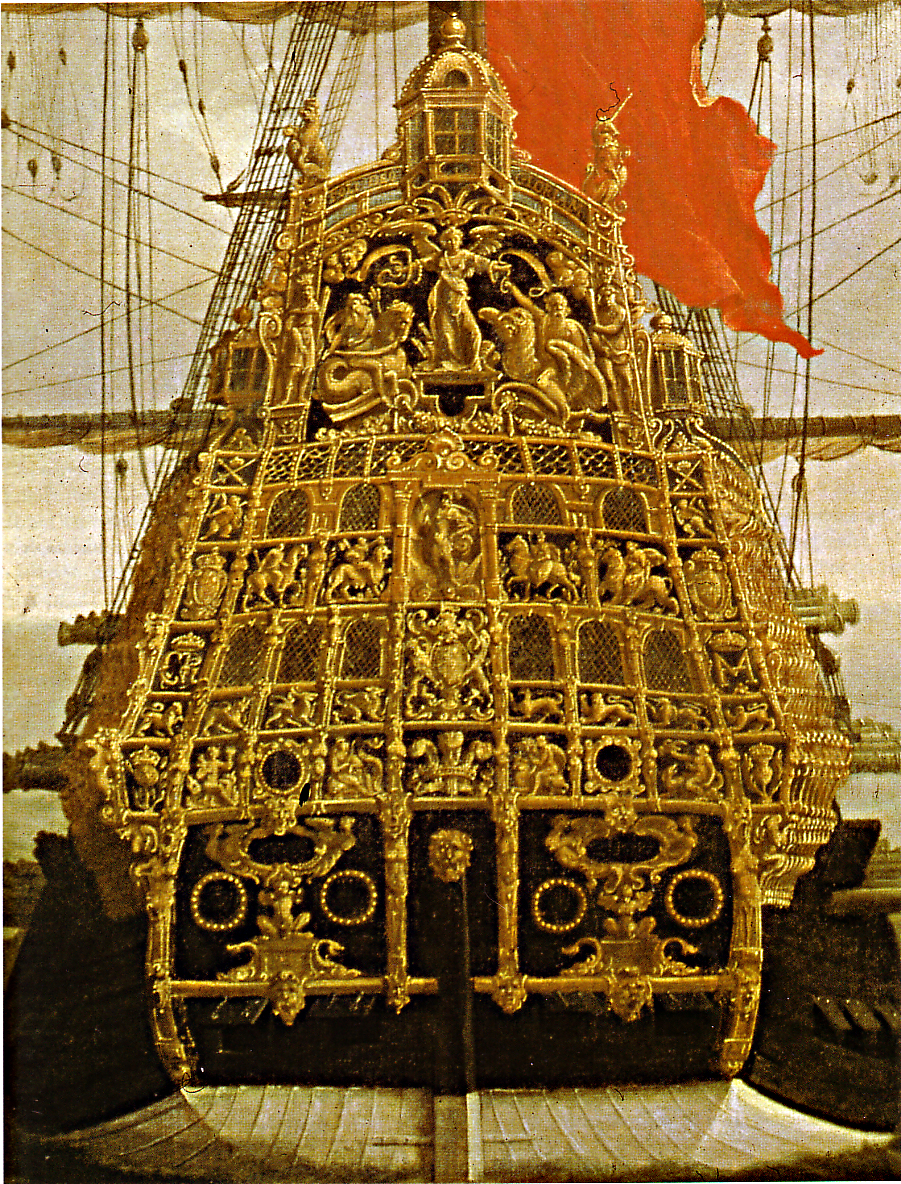
The elaborate stern of Sovereign of the Seas, built with ship money between 1634 and 1637; the gilt alone exceeded the cost of a normal warship

Hampden's role in the 1628 Parliament was largely behind the scenes, where his organisational and man-management skills could be best used, but placed him in the inner circle of parliamentary opposition. In 1629, the Earl of Warwick granted him lands in Saybrook Colony, now Old Saybrook, Connecticut; participation in the colonial movement was common among Puritan leaders. Other participants included Pym, who was treasurer of the Providence Island Company, Warwick, Lord Saye, Knightley, Henry Darley, William Waller, and Lord Brooke. Company meetings provided cover to organise political opposition; whether its members also considered permanent emigration is still disputed.

Hampden remained a relatively obscure figure, until 1637, when he was prosecuted in a test case to confirm the legality of ship money. This was a long-standing levy, raised in coastal counties to fund the Royal Navy, but only in time of war, not every year as Charles was now doing. Opposition was based on the principle of taxes imposed without parliamentary approval, not the tax itself; there was widespread support for a powerful navy to protect English trade.

Its extension into inland counties like Hampden's estates in Buckinghamshire widened opposition to its collection, and how it was spent. Sovereign of the Seas, a 100 gun warship built between 1634 and 1637, was a prestige project five times the cost of normal ships, too large for any English harbour and too slow to fight the Barbary pirates the Crown claimed justified building ships. Finally, rather than using it to deter Charles used it to transport Spanish bullion and supplies to Flanders for their war against the Protestant Dutch, payment for which he kept.

The parliamentary leaders, including Hampden, owned multiple properties, and to make it clear they only opposed its legality, they were careful to pay some assessments. Hampden was tried by the Court of Exchequer in June 1637 (R v Hampden), but divisions among the judges delayed their ruling until July 1638. Although seven out of the twelve found the tax legal, the fact five did not made it a public relations disaster for Charles; less than 20% of the £208,000 assessed for 1639 was paid. Many refused demands for coat and conduct money during the 1639 and 1640 Bishops' Wars, fearing if they did, Charles would turn them into permanent taxes.

=== 1640 to July 1642; the road to civil war ===
Following defeat in the first of the Bishops Wars, Charles recalled Parliament in April 1640; when the Short Parliament refused to vote taxes without concessions, he dissolved it after only three weeks. However, the humiliating terms imposed by the Scots after a second victory in 1640 forced him to hold fresh elections in November; Pym acted as unofficial leader of the opposition, with Hampden co-ordinating the different factions. Shortly after the Long Parliament assembled, it was presented with the Root and Branch petition; signed by 15,000 Londoners, it demanded England follow the Scottish example and expel bishops from the Church of England.

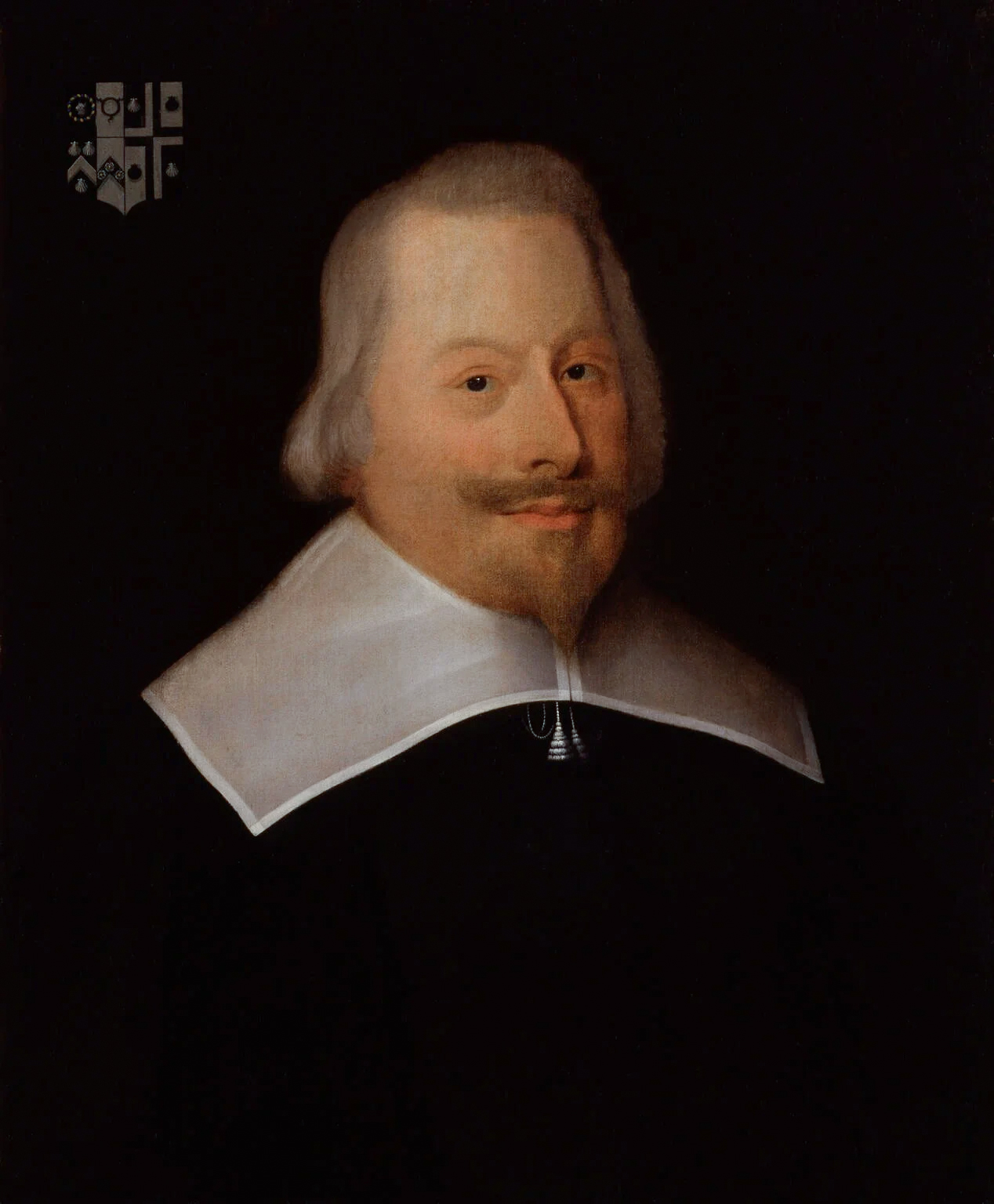
John Pym; co-ordinator of the Parliamentary opposition

This reflected widespread concern over Arminianism in the Church of England, seen as evidence of pro-Catholic policies and confirmed by Charles making war on the Protestant Scots, but not assisting his nephew Charles Louis against the Catholic Emperor. Many feared he was about to sign an alliance with Spain, a view shared by the French and Venetian ambassadors; ending arbitrary rule was thus important for England and the European Protestant cause in general. (Note: A perspective summarised by Francis Rous in 1641; "For Arminianism is the span of a Papist, and if you mark it well, you shall see an Arminian reaching to a Papist, a Papist to a Jesuit, a Jesuit to the Pope, and the other to the King of Spain. And having kindled fire in our neighbours, they now seek to set on flame this kingdom also.")

Since convention prevented direct attacks on Charles, the alternative was to prosecute his 'evil counsellors', showing even if he was above the law, his subordinates were not, and he could not protect them; the intention was to make others think twice about their actions. Laud was impeached in December 1640, and held in the Tower of London; (Note: He was not executed until 1645) the king's chief minister the Earl of Strafford, former Lord Deputy of Ireland and organiser of the 1640 Bishops War, was executed in May 1641.

The Commons also passed a series of constitutional reforms, including the Triennial Act 1640 (16 Cha. 1. c. 1), abolition of the Star Chamber, and an end to levying taxes without Parliament's consent. Voting as a block, the bishops ensured all these were rejected by the Lords. In June 1641, Parliament responded with the Bishops Exclusion Bill, which was rejected by the Lords. The outbreak of the Irish Rebellion in October brought matters to a head; both Charles and Parliament supported raising troops to suppress it, but neither trusted the other with their control.

The Grand Remonstrance was presented to Charles on 1 December 1641; unrest culminated in 23 to 29 December with widespread riots in Westminster, led by the London apprentices. Suggestions Parliamentary leaders helped organise these have not been proved, but it prevented bishops attending the Lords. On 30 December, John Williams, Archbishop of York and eleven other bishops, signed a complaint, disputing the legality of any laws passed by the Lords during their exclusion. Led by Denzil Holles, the Commons ruled this was an invitation for the king to dissolve Parliament, and all twelve were arrested for treason.

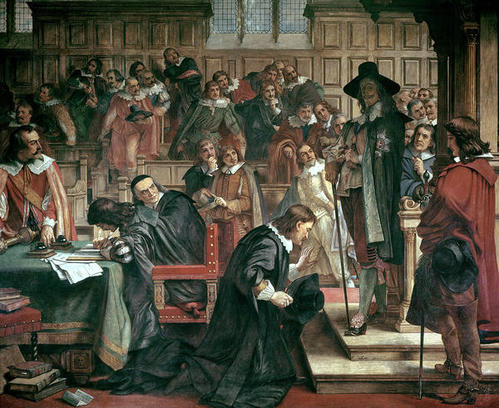
Charles attempts to arrest the Five Members, January 1642; a Victorian era re-imagining

On 4 January, Charles tried to arrest the Five Members, including Hampden, Pym and Holles; after it failed, he left London, accompanied by Royalist MPs like Edward Hyde, and members of the Lords. This was a major tactical mistake, as it gave his opponents majorities in both houses. However, even at this late stage, the vast majority on both sides wanted to avoid civil war, and petitioned Parliament and Charles to agree terms.

Pym and Hampden were among the few to understand only military victory could compel Charles to keep his commitments. He openly told foreign ambassadors any concessions were temporary, and would be retrieved by force if needed, an approach confirmed by the Scottish experience. The Irish Catholic rebels claimed approval for their actions; while untrue, the assertion was given weight by his attempts to use Irish troops against the Scots, and initial refusal to condemn the rebellion.

However, regardless of religion or political belief, in 1642 the vast majority believed a 'well-ordered' monarchy was divinely mandated; where they disagreed was what 'well-ordered' meant, and who held ultimate authority in clerical affairs. Since Charles could not be deposed, the only way of dealing with him was through military victory; it was this clarity that set Hampden, Pym, and later Oliver Cromwell apart from the majority. When the First English Civil War began, Hampden was appointed to the Committee of Safety.

=== August 1642 to June 1643; War and death ===
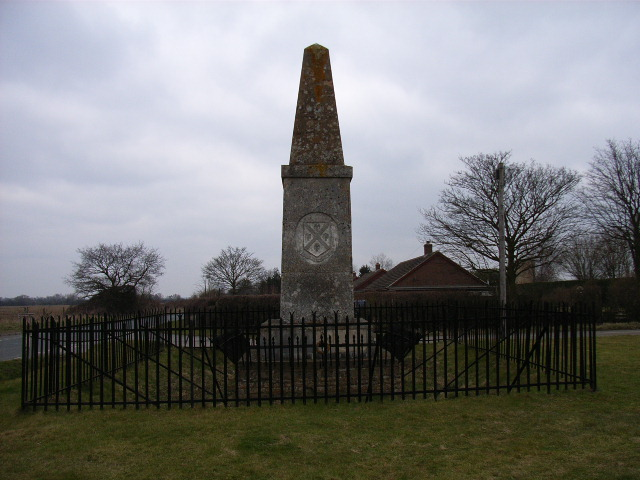
Monument to Hampden, near Chalgrove, sculpted by William Scoular, installed in 1843

When war began in August 1642, both sides expected it to be settled by a single, decisive battle; many areas remained neutral, while awaiting the result. Hampden raised a regiment, which acted as artillery escort at the Battle of Edgehill in October and helped repulse the Royalist cavalry. After the disastrous Battle of Brentford, he helped rally troops for the defence of London. However, his main contribution was holding the Parliamentary factions together over the first winter, and preparing for a long war by initiating the negotiations that led to the Solemn League and Covenant with the Scots in August 1643.

When the 1643 campaign began, Hampden was serving with the Earl of Essex, whose lack of aggression was already causing concern. Tasked with taking the Royalist war capital of Oxford, Essex captured Reading on 27 April, where he remained until mid May. On 18 June 1643, Hampden was wounded at the Battle of Chalgrove Field; shot twice in the shoulder, the wound became infected. Later claims that these injuries were caused by the explosion of his own pistol have not been substantiated.

He died at home six days later, and was buried in Great Hampden church. Unlike Pym, who died of cancer in December, his loss was mourned on both sides of the conflict; his close friend Anthony Nicholl wrote ‘Never Kingdom received a greater loss in one subject, never a man a truer and more faithful friend.’ In 1843, George Nugent-Grenville, a Whig radical politician and author of the hagiographic and often inaccurate Memorials of John Hampden, paid for the Hampden Monument, located near the battle site.

== Legacy ==
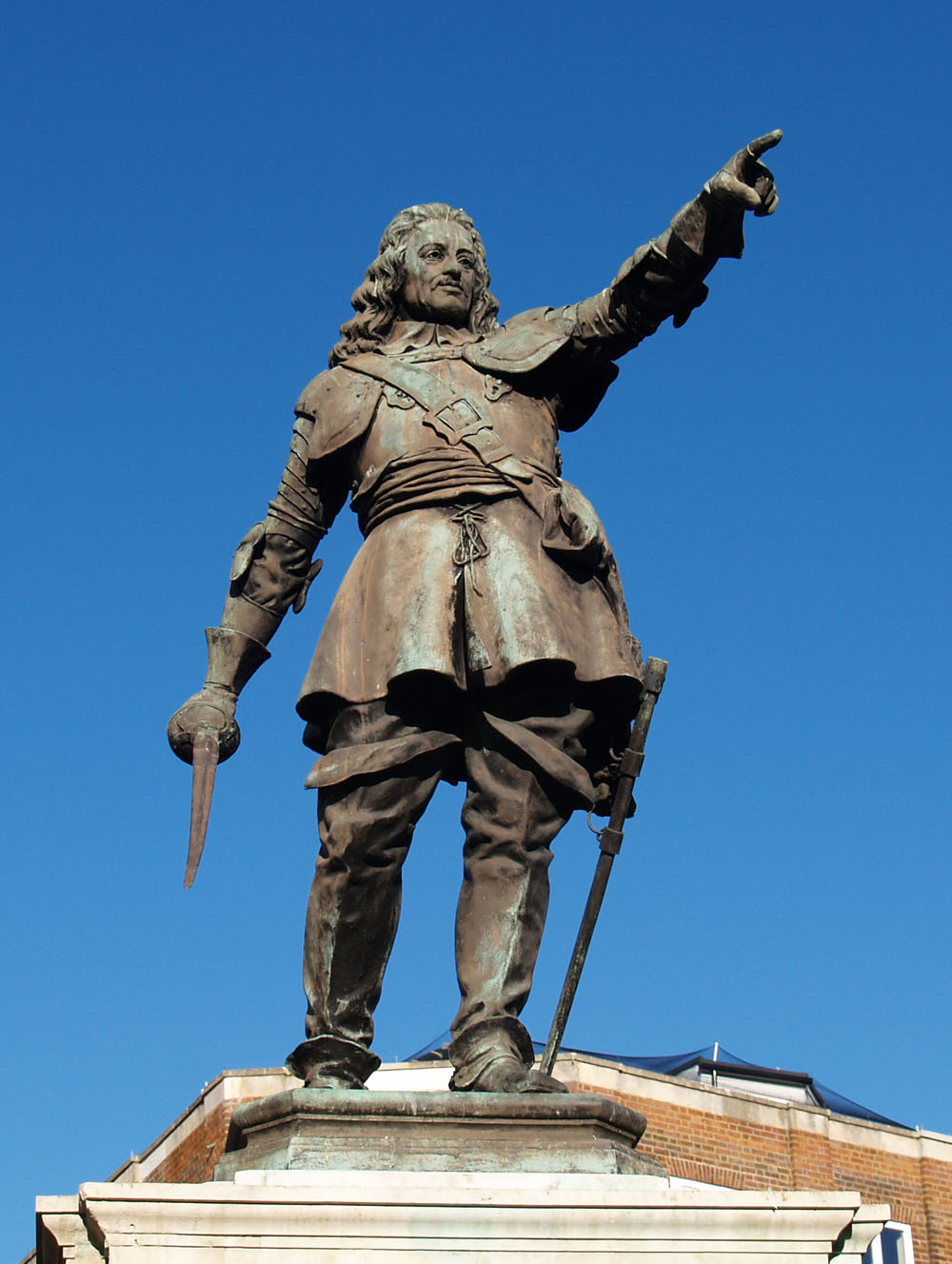
Statue of Hampden, in Aylesbury, Buckinghamshire; he is pointing towards his home in Great Hampden

His death in 1643 meant Hampden avoided the bitter internal debates that led to the execution of Charles in 1649, and establishment of the Commonwealth of England. As a result, he is a less complex figure than either Pym or his cousin Oliver Cromwell. One example of this appears in Thomas Gray's poem "Elegy Written in a Country Churchyard", which includes the lines "Some village-Hampden, that with dauntless breast / The little tyrant of his fields withstood...Some Cromwell guiltless of his country's blood."

In reality, both he and Pym recognised far earlier than most Charles had to be defeated militarily, but since Hampden rarely made speeches, he was far less visible. In his 'History of the Rebellion', Clarendon claimed his influence and reputation derived from his man management skills and organisational abilities. Prior to the 1774 American Revolution, Benjamin Franklin and John Adams used Hampden to claim rebellion against the state could be reconciled with patriotism, while his death in battle allowed him to be positioned as a martyr to the cause of liberty.

The early 19th century British radical movement set up Hampden Clubs, and he was referenced by Radical poet Percy Shelley. In Mary Shelley's novel Frankenstein he appears as a symbol of rebellion against patriarchal authority. When the Palace of Westminster was rebuilt after 1834, he was selected as one of the famous Parliamentary figures whose statues are positioned in St Stephen's Hall. As one of the Five Members he is annually commemorated at the State Opening of Parliament. The early 20th century Suffragette movement used him to justify their slogan of 'No vote, no tax', as do modern anti-tax resisters, although this misses the point he objected to levying them without the approval of Parliament, not the taxes themselves.

A variety of establishments bear his name, in Britain, and other parts of the English-speaking world, notably the United States; these include Hampden-Sydney College, Virginia, founded in 1775, plus numerous schools, towns, counties, hospitals, and geographical points. His enduring popularity as a symbol of Parliamentary freedom continues; Mount Hampden was selected as the location for the new Parliament of Zimbabwe building, due for completion in 2022. One of the London Underground electric locomotives used on the Metropolitan line was named "John Hampden"; retired in 1961, it is now on display in the London Transport Museum. Hampden Park, Scotland’s national football stadium, is named after him. In addition, two Masonic lodges bear his name; Lodge 6290, in Oxfordshire, and 6483 in Buckinghamshire as well as the Statue of John Hampden in Market Square, Aylesbury.

Multiple communities are named after him as well including Hampden County, Massachusetts, Hampden, Massachusetts, Hampden, Maine, Hamden, Connecticut, and the Hampden neighborhood of Baltimore, Maryland in the United States as well as Hampden, Newfoundland and Labrador in Canada.

The Handley Page Hampden, a Second World War bomber, was named after him.

A state grammar school in High Wycombe, John Hampden Grammar School, is named after him.

== Sources ==
- BCW Project. "Colonel John Hampden's Regiment of Foot". BCW Project. Archived from the original on 21 October 2020.
- Adair, John (1979). "The Death of John Hampden". History Today. 29 (10).
- Barry, John M (2012). Roger Williams and the Creation of the American Soul: Church, State, and the Birth of Liberty. Viking Press. ISBN 978-0670023059.
- Berckman, Evelyn (1974). Creators and Destroyers of the English Navy. Hamish Hamilton. ISBN 978-0241890349.
- Clarendon, Earl of (1704). The History of the Rebellion and Civil Wars in England; Volume III (2019 ed.). Wentworth Press. ISBN 978-0469445765.
- Crawford, Ian (1988). "Wading through slaughter: John Hampden, Thomas Gary, and Mary Shelley's "Frankenstein"". Studies in the Novel. 20 (3): 249–261. JSTOR 29532578.
- Duffin, Anne; Hunneyball, Paul (2010). ARUNDELL, John (1576–1654), of Trerice, Newlyn, Cornw in The History of Parliament: the House of Commons 1604–1629. CUP. ISBN 978-1107002258.
- Gray, Thomas (1825). The Works of Thomas Gray, Containing His Poems and Correspondence: With Memoirs of His Life and Writings, Volume 1. Harding, Triphook, and Lepard.
- Green, Oliver; Graham, Benjamin (1988). London's Underground: The Story of the Tube (2019 ed.). White Lion Publishing. ISBN 978-0711240131.
- Harris, Tim (2014). Rebellion: Britain's First Stuart Kings, 1567-1642. OUP. ISBN 978-0199209002.
- Historic England. "Hampden Monument (Grade II) (1059742)". National Heritage List for England.
- Hostettler, John (1997). Sir Edward Coke: A Force for Freedom (2006 ed.). Universal Law Publishing Co Ltd. ISBN 978-8175345690.
- Hunneyball, Paul (2010). ROUS, Francis (1581-1659), of Landrake, Cornw.; later of Brixham, Devon, Eton, Bucks. and Acton, Mdx; in The History of Parliament: the House of Commons 1604-1629. CUP. ISBN 978-1107002258.
- Hutton, Ronald (2003). The Royalist War Effort 1642-1646. Routledge. ISBN 9780415305402.
- Jansson, Maija (2009). "Shared Memory: John Hampden, New World and Old". British Society for Eighteenth-Century Studies. 32 (2): 157–171. doi:10.1111/j.1754-0208.2008.00106.x.
- Jessup, Frank W. (2013). Background to the English Civil War: The Commonwealth and International Library: History Division. Elsevier. ISBN 9781483181073.
- Keeler, Mary Frear; Janssen Cole, Maija (1997). Proceedings in Parliament, 1628, Volume 4, (Yale Proceedings in Parliament). University of Rochester Press. ISBN 978-1580460095.
- Lester, Derek; Blackshaw, Gill (2000). The Controversy of John Hampden's Death. Chalgrove Battle Group. ISBN 978-0953803408.
- Macleod, Donald (Autumn 2009). "The influence of Calvinism on politics" (PDF). Theology in Scotland. XVI (2).
- Manganiello, Stephen (2004). The Concise Encyclopedia of the Revolutions and Wars of England, Scotland, and Ireland, 1639–1660. Scarecrow Press. ISBN 978-0810851009.
- Moyes, Philip J. R. (1965). The Handley Page Hampden. Aircraft in Profile. Vol. 58. Profile Publications Ltd.
- Mushanawani, Cletus (20 December 2019). "Mt Hampden City taking shape". The Herald.
- Pyle, Andrew (2000). The Dictionary of Seventeenth-century British Philosophers, Volume I. Thoemmes Continuum. ISBN 978-1855067042.
- Russell, Conrad (2008). "Hampden, John". Oxford Dictionary of National Biography (online ed.). Oxford University Press. doi:10.1093/ref:odnb/12169. (Subscription, Wikipedia Library access or UK public library membership required.)
- Rees, John (2016). The Leveller Revolution. Verso. ISBN 978-1784783907.
- Seel, Graham E.; Smith, David L. (2005). The Early Stuart Kings, 1603-1642. Routledge. ISBN 978-1-134-59287-6.
- Smith, Steven (1979). "Almost Revolutionaries: The London Apprentices during the Civil Wars". Huntington Library Quarterly. 42 (4): 313–328. doi:10.2307/3817210. JSTOR 3817210.
- St Stephens Hall. "St Stephens Hall". Parliament.
- Thompson, Christopher (2010). HAMPDEN, Richard (1596-1659/60), of Great Hampden, Bucks. and Emmington, Oxon in The History of Parliament: the House of Commons 1604–1629 (Online ed.). CUP. ISBN 978-1107002258.
- Thrush, Andrew (2010). "The Parliament of 1626". In Thrush, Andrew; Ferris, John P. (eds.). the House of Commons 1604–1629. The History of Parliament. CUP. ISBN 978-1107002258.
- Van Duinen, Jared (2007). Prosopography and the Providence Island Company: The Nature of Puritan Opposition in 1630s England. OUP. ISBN 9781900934121.
- Wedgwood, C. V. (1961). The King's Peace, 1637–1641 (1983 ed.). Penguin Classics. ISBN 978-0140069907.
- Weinfield, Henry (1991). The Poet Without a Name: Gray's Elegy and the Problem of History. SIU Press.
- Williams, Jonathan C. (2018). "Thomas Gray's Elegy and the Politics of Memorialization". SEL: Studies in English Literature 1500–1900. 58 (3): 653–672. doi:10.1353/sel.2018.0026. hdl:11693/76066. S2CID 149664141.
- WJJ (1981). Hasler, P. W. (ed.). HAMPDEN, William (1570-97), of Great Hampden, Bucks. The History of Parliament (Online ed.). Boydell and Brewer.
- Young, Alfred A (1984). "English Plebeian Culture in 18th Century American Radicalism". In Jacob, Margaret; Jacob, James (eds.). The Origins of Anglo-American Radicalism (1991 ed.). Humanities Press International Inc., U.S. ISBN 978-0391037038.

Parliament of England
Preceded by Sir Francis Barnham; Thomas St Aubyn	Member of Parliament for Grampound; 1621–1622; With: Sir Robert Carey	Succeeded by John Mohun; Sir Richard Edgecumbe
Constituency disenfranchised 1309–1624	Member of Parliament for Wendover; 1624–1629; With: Alexander Denton 1624; Richard Hampden 1625; Sampson Darrell 1626; Ralph Hawtree 1628–1629	Parliament suspended until 1640
Vacant Parliament suspended since 1629	Member of Parliament for Buckinghamshire; 1640–1643; With: Arthur Goodwin	Succeeded by George Fleetwood; Edmund West
