= Ingoldsby =

Ingoldsby may refer to:

== Places ==
- Ingoldsby, Lincolnshire, England
- Ingoldsby, Ontario, Canada
- Ingoldsby, Queensland, Australia

== People ==
- Francis Ingoldsby (1615–1681), English landowner, Member of Parliament for Buckingham
- Henry Ingoldsby, MP for Limerick City 1727–1729
- John "Jack" Ingoldsby (1924–1982), Canadian professional ice hockey player
- Maeve Ingoldsby (1947–2021), Irish playwright and satirist
- Pat Ingoldsby (1942–2025), Irish poet and television presenter
- Richard Ingoldsby (disambiguation), several people
- Thomas Ingoldsby (politician) (1689–1768), English landowner, MP for Aylesbury
- Thomas Ingoldsby, pen name of Richard Harris Barham (1788–1845), author of The Ingoldsby Legends
- Ingoldsby baronets, including:
  - Sir Henry Ingoldsby, 1st Baronet (1622–1701), English landowner, military commander, MP for County Clare, Limerick and County Kerry
  - George Ingoldsby, MP for Limerick and Kilmallock in 1659
