= Richard Ingoldsby (disambiguation) =

Sir Richard Ingoldsby (1617–1685) was an English army officer and regicide.

Richard Ingoldsby or Ingoldesby may also refer to:

- Richard Ingoldsby (knight), English landowner, knighted in 1617, father of the above
- Richard Ingoldsby (British Army officer, died 1712), British Army lieutenant-general, grandson of the above and nephew of the regicide
- Richard Ingoldesby (died 1719), British Army colonel and lieutenant-governor of New York
- Richard Ingoldsby (British Army officer, died 1759), British Army brigadier-general, great-grandson of the regicide
