= Richard Ingoldsby (knight) =

Sir Richard Ingoldsby, KB, of Lethenborough, Buckinghamshire, was the son of Sir Richard Ingoldsby (d. 1635) of Lethenborough, the High Sheriff of Buckinghamshire in 1606, and of his first wife Elizabeth Palmer. She was the daughter of William Palmer, of Waddesdon, Buckinghamshire and Joyce Pigott, (b. 20 Dec 1548, married 28 Aug 1572).

He was knighted on 22 October 1617 by King James I, during a royal visit to his father-in-law's house at Hinchingbrooke.

== Family ==
He married before 1614 Elizabeth Cromwell, (d. 2 May 1666), the daughter of Sir Oliver Cromwell of Hinchingbrooke House, who was the uncle and godfather of Oliver Cromwell, the Lord Protector. Elizabeth was previously married to Henry Neale Sr., with whom she had three sons.

Ingoldsby and his wife had twelve surviving children, and one (Dorothy) who died in infancy:

1. Francis Ingoldsby (1614–1681), MP for Buckingham 1654–1659
2. Elizabeth, (b. c1616), d. unmarried
3. Colonel Sir Richard Ingoldsby (1617–1685), regicide
4. Sir Oliver Ingoldsby (b. 1619) An officer in the parliamentary army, died at the siege of Pendennis Castle (March–August 1646)
5. John Ingoldsby (1621-c.1684). Incorrectly thought to have died at sea, he went to America & settled in Boston in 1640, the ancestor of the various American Ingoldsby families. Married before 1649 Ruth Griffin, widow.
6. Ann Ingoldsby (b 1621, bur. 28.11.1704), of Gortkilleen, Co. Limerick. She married Sir Edward Chaloner of Guisborough, Yorks; he was the son of Reverend Edward Chaloner and Elizabeth Horendon. Rev. Edward was the son of Thomas Chaloner (courtier), and brother of James Chaloner and Thomas Chaloner (regicide) who escaped to France at the Restoration in 1660.
7. Sir Henry Ingoldsby, 1st Baronet (1622–1701).
8. Colonel Sir George Ingoldsby, Kt. (born c1624). He fought in Ireland with Cromwell, who gave him lands in County Limerick; Gortkilleen of Caherelly, Boherlegan and Ballybricken. He married Mary Gould, (heiress of James Goold of Ludden Castle) through who he had lands of Corbally, north of Limerick city. Given Ballybricken castle in the parish of Ludden, barony of Clanwilliam.
  He was MP for the City and County of the City of Limerick and Kilmallock in the Parliament of 1659, and Poll Tax collector in Limerick in 1660 and 1661. He was Mayor of Limerick in 1672.
  He had a son, Lt-General Richard Ingoldsby (died 1712), and a daughter Barbara, who married William Smyth, builder of Barbavilla House, Collinstown, County Westmeath.
  It is said that George Ingoldsby died during the 'Dutch Wars' (probably the Eighty Years' War (1568–1648) in which English and Irish soldiers - the "Wild Geese" - fought on the Spanish side): but this seems not to be the case.
9. Sarah, (b. c1625), d. unmarried
10. William Ingoldsby (b. 1627).
11. Mary Ingoldsby (b. 1629). She married a Major Read in the Parliamentary army who was wounded at the Siege of Bristol.
12. Captain Thomas Ingoldsby (b. c1630) of Dedham, Essex. In 1646 he was a captain in his brother Richard's regiment, Colonel Richard Ingoldsby's Regiment of Foot in the New Model Army, and a captain in the Regiment of Colonel Matthew Allured in 1660. This regiment was normally commanded by Lord Edward Montagu, 1st Earl of Sandwich, it was only Allured's between January and April 1660.
