= Henry Ingoldsby =

Henry Ingoldsby may refer to:

- Sir Henry Ingoldsby, 1st Baronet (1622–1701), of the Ingoldsby baronets
- Henry Ingoldsby (MP), MP for Limerick City 1727–9
