= Aaron Crossley Hobart Seymour =

Aaron Crossley Hobart Seymour (1789–1870) was an Anglo-Irish religious author and hymn-writer.

== Life ==
The elder brother of Michael Hobart Seymour, he was the son of John Crossley Seymour, vicar of Caherelly in the Church of Ireland diocese of Cashel, who married Catherine Wight, the eldest daughter of reverend Edward Wight, rector of Meelick, County Limerick, a member of an old Surrey family. He was born in County Limerick on 19 December 1789, and received most of his education at home.

He was drawn in early life to the religious group formed by Selina Hastings, Countess of Huntingdon. About 1850 he went to reside in Italy, and spent many years in Naples. In 1869 he retired to Bristol, and died there in October 1870.

== Works ==
His first work was Vital Christianity, a series of letters on religion, addressed to young persons; it appeared in 1810; a second edition was published in 1819. This work contains his hymns, some of which became popular. In 1816, Seymour published a memoir of Charlotte Brooke, prefixed to an edition of her Reliques of Irish Poetry. His Life and Times of Selina, Countess of Huntingdon appeared in 1839. He edited also the life of George Whitefield by John Gillies.

Interested in hymnology, he assisted Josiah Miller in preparing his Singers and Songs of the Church.

== Arms ==
Coat of arms of Aaron Crossley Hobart Seymour
| Notes Granted 10 October 1911 by Nevile Rodwell Wilkinson, Ulster King of Arms. Crest Out of a mural crown a phoenix Or in flames Proper. Escutcheon Azure a pair of wings conjoined in lure surmounted by a mural crown Or. Motto Foy Pour Devoir |
