= Michael Hobart Seymour =

Anglo-Irish writer and priest

Michael Hobart Seymour (1800–1874) was an Anglo-Irish Protestant clergyman and religious controversialist.

== Life ==
He was born on 29 September 1800, the sixth son of John Crossley Seymour, vicar of Caherelly (d. 19 May 1831), who married in January 1789 Catherine, eldest daughter and coheiress of Rev. Edward Wight, rector of Meelick in Limerick. Aaron Crossley Hobart Seymour was his brother. In 1823 he graduated B.A. of Trinity College, Dublin, and proceeded M.A. in 1832. He was admitted ad eundem at Oxford on 2 June 1836, and comitatis causa on 26 October 1865.

Seymour was ordained deacon in 1823 and priest in 1824. The first thirty-four years of his life were passed in Ireland in clerical work. He was also secretary to the Irish Protestant Association. An untiring polemicist, he became very unpopular in Ireland, and about 1834 migrated to England. For several years he was evening lecturer at St George the Martyr, Southwark, afternoon lecturer at St Anne, Blackfriars, and travelling secretary for the Reformation Society.

In January 1844 Seymour married, at Walcot church, Bath, Maria, only daughter of General Thomas of the East India Company's service, and widow of Baron Brown-Mill (George Gavin Browne Mill), physician to Louis XVIII. From that time he resided, when in England, at Bath, and did not hold any preferment in the church. In September 1844 Seymour and his wife travelled by easy stages to Rome.

Seymour died at 27 Marlborough Buildings, Bath, on 19 June 1874, leaving no issue, and was buried at Locksbrook Cemetery on 25 June.

== Works ==
Seymour contributed to newspapers, published pamphlets, and lectured against the Roman Catholic Church. He brought out in 1838 a new edition, with five appendices, of John Foxe's Acts and Monuments of the Church.

He described his visit to Rome in two books, ‘A Pilgrimage to Rome,’ 1848, 4th edit. 1851, and ‘Mornings among the Jesuits at Rome; being Notes of Conversations held with certain Jesuits in that City,’ 1849 (3rd edit. 1850; 5th edit. 1852). The first book was criticised in ‘A brief Review by A. M.,’ Bath, 1849, and the second in The Rambler, iv. 144–9 (1849). Seymour had a rhetorical way of marshalling his facts, and his deductions could not always be relied upon. But he followed up his attack in ‘Evenings with the Romanists. With an introductory chapter on the Moral Results of the Romish System,’ 1854; 2nd edit. 1855. This was issued at New York in 1855, and in the same year was reissued at Philadelphia in an edited form. It was also translated into Spanish, and had a large circulation in Mexico.

A lecture on ‘Nunneries,’ issued in 1852, involved him in a controversy with Cardinal Nicholas Wiseman, who published a reply.
