= Richard Ingoldsby (British Army officer, died 1759) =

- Born: c. 1690; Waldridge, Buckinghamshire
- Died: 16 December 1759; Lower Grosvenor Street, London
- Burial place: Hartwell, Buckinghamshire
- Relatives: Sir Richard Ingoldsby (1617–1685); Lieutenant-General Richard Ingoldsby (?–1712)
- Military career
- Allegiance: Great Britain
- Branch: Army
- Service years: 1707–1745
- Rank: Brigadier
- Unit: Grenadier Guards
- Conflicts: War of the Spanish Succession Oudenarde Malplaquet; War of the Austrian Succession; Dettingen Fontenoy

Richard Ingoldsby (1690–1759) was a professional soldier in the British Army from 1707 to 1745, who reached the rank of Brigadier-General.

He served in Flanders during the War of the Austrian Succession and court-martialled after the Battle of Fontenoy in May 1745, allegedly for failing to carry out his orders. Ingoldsby felt he was taking the blame for mistakes made by the 24 year old Duke of Cumberland and the evidence supported his claim to have received inconsistent orders. However, his contemporaries considered this an inadequate excuse; the court concluded his failure arose 'from an error of judgement, and not from want of courage' but he was forced out of the army.

== Life ==
He was the son of Richard Ingoldsby (1654–1703) of Waldridge, Buckinghamshire, and his wife Mary Colmore. The family owned lands in Buckinghamshire and Ireland; his grandfather and namesake, Sir Richard Ingoldsby (1617-1685), signed the death warrant for Charles I but retained his title and lands under Charles II.

== Career ==
His father's cousin, yet another Richard Ingoldsby (1665-1712), served with Marlborough during the War of the Spanish Succession and appointed Commander-in-Chief, Ireland in 1707. In April 1707, the younger Ingoldsby was commissioned into his regiment, the 18th Foot, later Royal Irish, and served with it in Flanders. The 18th fought at Oudenarde and Malplaquet until the war ended in 1713, by which time Ingoldsby was a captain.

During the 1715 Jacobite Rising, he transferred to the Foot Guards; this provided personal protection to George I and its officers considered loyal to the new regime. Britain was largely at peace for the next 25 years and it was not until November 1739 that Ingoldsby received his next promotion.

After the War of the Austrian Succession began in 1740, the Duke of Cumberland was made colonel of the regiment; it was posted to Flanders and Ingoldsby appointed a brigadier of foot. In March 1745, Cumberland replaced George Wade as Allied commander in Flanders, where his opponent was Maurice de Saxe, one of the most talented generals of the period.

== Battle of Fontenoy ==
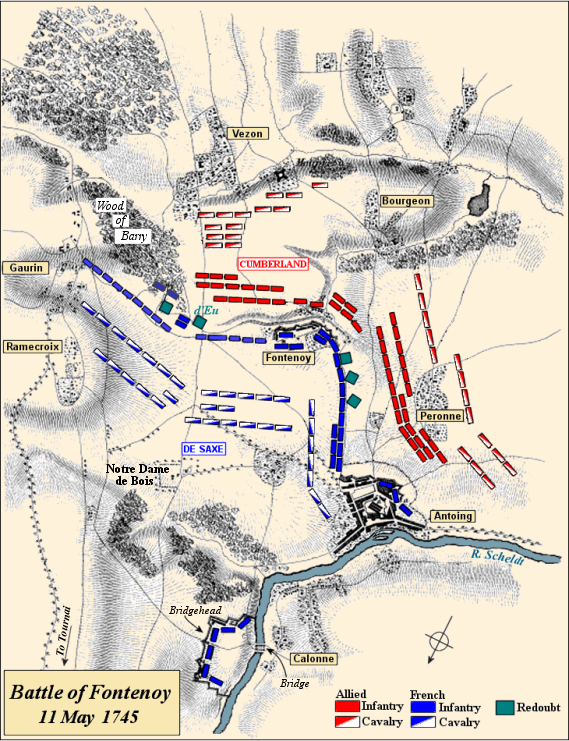
The French line (blue), running from St Antoine (bottom right), the Redoubt d'Eu just before the Bois de Barry (top left)

A reconnaissance carried out by Cumberland and his senior officers on 9 May identified the Redoubt de Chambonas but not the Redoubt d'Eu, the strongest position on the French left. The next day was spent clearing French positions at Vezin (see Map) but a suggestion they should do the same for the Bois de Barry was ignored. Delays in deploying the Allied forces meant the attack was postponed until 11 May, both armies camping overnight on their positions.

Cumberland ordered Ingoldsby to capture the Redoubt de Chambonas and clear the woods, while the Dutch attacked Fontenoy. Once both flanks were engaged, massed Allied infantry in the centre would move up the slope and dislodge the main French army. Shortly before 6:00 am, Ingoldsby began his attack, bringing him into contact with the previously undetected Redoubt d'Eu. His troops also came under fire from French skirmishers in the Bois de Barry, mixed cavalry and infantry troops known as Harquebusiers de Grassins. These numbered no more than 900 but uncertain of their strength, Ingoldsby requested artillery and cavalry support; given the earlier failure to detect the redoubt, his caution was understandable but delayed the main attack.

Impatient with the lack of progress, Cumberland ordered Ingoldsby to ignore the redoubt and advance with the main column, but did not inform Ligonier of this change. Two Dutch assaults on the village of Fontenoy failed; the main attack did not take place until 12:30 and went ahead without securing either of the flanks. Ingoldsby was wounded, while two regiments of his brigade suffered the largest casualties of any units involved in the attack on the French centre. The Allies were rescued by the tenacity and discipline of their infantry but Fontenoy ended the myth of British military superiority held in Europe since Marlborough.

In the recriminations that followed, Ingoldsby was court-martialled for failing to attack the Redoubt d'Eu, although his claim to have received inconsistent orders was supported by the evidence. The court concluded his failure arose 'from an error of judgement, and not from want of courage' but he was forced out of the army. Cumberland gave him three months to sell his commission and retire, but in the general panic that accompanied the Jacobite Rising, George II refused to allow him to sell his majority in the Guards. It was given to Colonel John Laforey in November, Ingoldsby incurring a large financial loss as a result.

He died at home in Lower Grosvenor Street, London on 16 December 1759, and was buried at the family seat, Hartwell, Buckinghamshire, along with his widow Catherine, who died 28 January 1789.

== Sources ==
- Black, Jeremy (1998). Britain as a Military Power, 1688–1815. Routledge. ISBN 1-85728-772-X.
- Browning, Reed (1995). The War of the Austrian Succession. Griffin. ISBN 978-0312125615.
- Charteris, Evan (1913). William Augustus, Duke of Cumberland: His Early Life and Times (1721-1748) (2012 ed.). Forgotten Books.
- Chichester, HM (2004). "Ingoldsby, Richard". Oxford Dictionary of National Biography (Online ed.). Oxford University Press. doi:10.1093/ref:odnb/14412. (Subscription, Wikipedia Library access or UK public library membership required.)
- Mcintyre, Jim (2016). The Development of British Light Infantry, Continental and North American Influences, 1740-1765. Winged Hussar. ISBN 978-0996365703.
- Skrine, Francis Henry (1906). Fontenoy and Great Britain's Share in the War of the Austrian Succession 1741–48 (2018 ed.). Forgotten Books. ISBN 978-0260413550.
- Venning, Timothy (2004). "Ingoldsby, Sir Richard, appointed Lord Ingoldsby under the protectorate". Oxford Dictionary of National Biography (Online ed.). Oxford University Press. doi:10.1093/ref:odnb/14411. (Subscription, Wikipedia Library access or UK public library membership required.)
