= Lenborough Hoard =

Hoard of Anglo-Saxon coins found in England

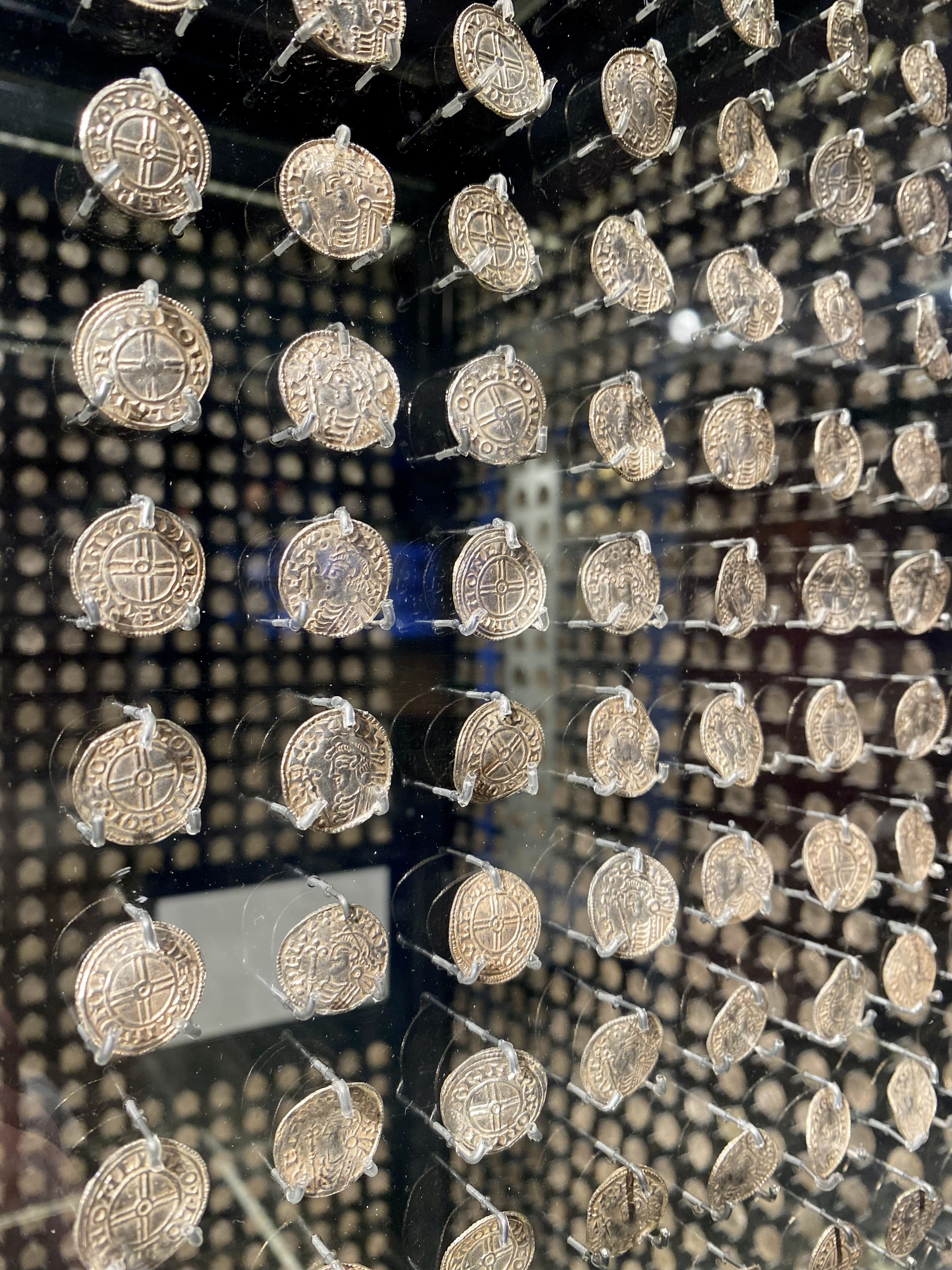
- Coins of Canute the Great from the Lenborough Hoard at Buckinghamshire County Museum
- Size: 5,252 silver coins
- Period/culture: Anglo-Saxon
- Discovered: 21 December 2014; Lenborough, Buckinghamshire; 51.977°N 0.981°W

The Lenborough Hoard is a hoard of more than 5,000 late Anglo-Saxon silver coins, dating to the eleventh century, that was found at Lenborough in Buckinghamshire, England in 2014. It is believed to be one of the largest hoards of Anglo-Saxon coins ever found in Britain. It is now on display at Discover Bucks Museum in Aylesbury.

== Discovery ==
The hoard was discovered, on 21 December 2014, on farmland in the Buckinghamshire hamlet of Lenborough, between Buckingham and Padbury, during a metal detectorist rally organised by the Weekend Wanderers Detecting Club involving approximately one hundred people. One of the participants, Paul Coleman, located the coins inside a lead container buried 2 feet (0.61 m) under the ground.

Coleman said that he "found a piece of lead and thought it was junk. But then I looked back in the hole and saw one shiny coin. Then I lifted a larger piece of lead and saw row upon row of coins stacked neatly." According to Pete Welch, the founder of the club, the coins were in remarkably good condition: "They're like mirrors, no scratching, and buried really carefully in a lead container, deep down. It looks as though only two people have handled these coins, the person who made them and the person who buried them." They were found protected in a "lead parcel" in the local heavy clay soil.

Buckinghamshire County Museum archaeologist Ros Tyrell, the Buckinghamshire Finds Liaison Officer for the Portable Antiquities Scheme, was present during the rally to record any objects discovered, and excavated the hoard immediately after it was found. The hoard was taken to the British Museum for examination and conservation.

== Contents ==
The hoard consists of 5,252 silver coins, of which 5,251 are whole and one is a portion of a coin that had been cut in half. They date from the first half of the eleventh century, and include many coins from the reigns of two Anglo-Saxon kings, Æthelred the Unready (reigned 978–1013 and 1014–1016) and Cnut the Great (reigned 1016–1035). The coins were wrapped in a sheet of lead. The reasons for the burial of the hoard are unknown.

== Valuation ==
As the hoard consists of precious metal more than 300 years old, it was assessed by a coroner under the terms of the Treasure Act 1996 to determine whether it was treasure. Having found to be so, the hoard would be valued by the Treasure Valuation Committee, and a museum could apply to acquire it by paying the amount of the valuation, which would be shared equally by the discoverer and the landowner. The coins are in such good condition that their total value was estimated at possibly as much as £1.3 million.

In June 2016, the Treasure Valuation Committee valued the hoard at £1.35 million. Following a fundraiser the hoard is now on display at Discover Bucks Museum, previously Bucks County Museum, in Aylesbury with a portion on loan to the Buckingham Old Gaol museum.

== See also ==
- Staffordshire Hoard, a large hoard of Anglo-Saxon gold and silver metalwork
