= Ingoldsby baronets =

Extinct baronetcy in the Baronetage of England

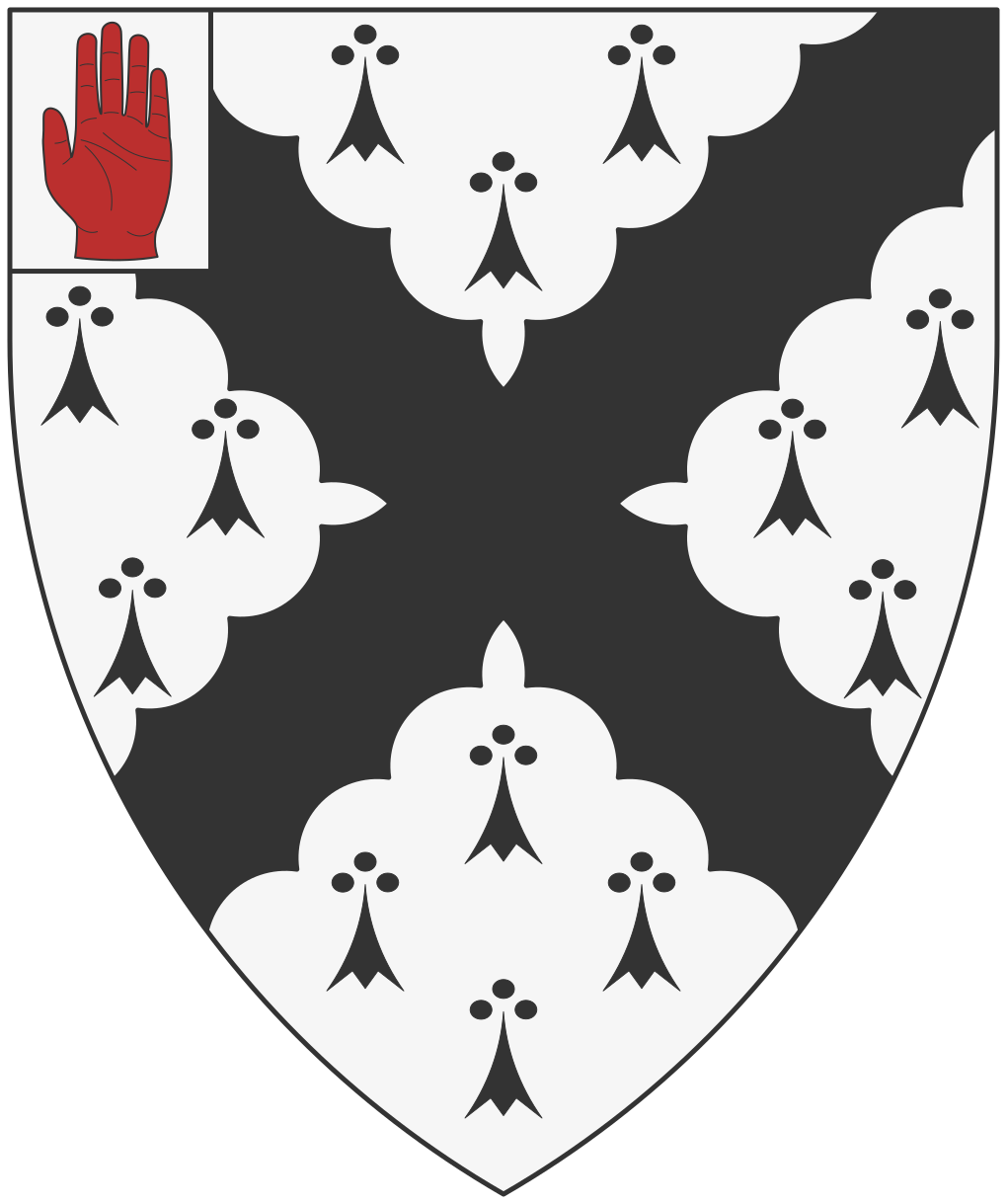
The coat of arms of Ingoldsby of Lethenborough, Baronets.

The Ingoldsby Baronetcy, of Lethenborough in the County of Buckingham, was a title in the Baronetage of England. It was created on 30 August 1661 for Henry Ingoldsby. The title became extinct on the death of the third Baronet in 1726.

== Ingoldsby Baronets, of Lethenborough (1661) ==
- Sir Henry Ingoldsby, 1st Baronet (1622–1701)
- Sir George Ingoldsby, 2nd Baronet. Married Anne, daughter of Sir Peter Stanley of Alderley Hall, 2nd Bt. (1626–1683). One son, William.
- Sir William Ingoldsby, 3rd Baronet (1670–1726). Married Theophila, daughter of Sir Kingsmill Lucy of Broxbourne 2nd Bt. One daughter.
