= Richard Ingoldsby (British Army officer, died 1712) =

Lieutenant-General The Right Honourable Richard Ingoldsby
- Born: 1664/5
- Died: 29 January 1712; Mary Street, Dublin
- Burial place: Christ Church Cathedral, Dublin
- Military career
- Allegiance: Kingdom of Great Britain
- Branch: British Army
- Service years: c.1678–1712
- Rank: Lieutenant-General
- Commands: Royal Welch Fusiliers; Commander-in-Chief, Ireland
- Conflicts: Nine Years' War; Raid on Newry; Siege of Namur; War of the Spanish Succession; Battle of Schellenberg; Battle of Blenheim; Siege of Ath

Lieutenant-General Richard Ingoldsby (died 1712) was an Anglo-Irish general, who enjoyed the personal regard of John Churchill, 1st Duke of Marlborough, and later played a prominent role in the government of Ireland.

He was the son of Colonel Sir George Ingoldsby, a soldier who came to Ireland with his cousin Oliver Cromwell, and his wife Mary Gould, daughter of James Gould of Ludden Castle, Corbally, County Limerick. His father was the sixth son of Sir Richard Ingoldsby of Lenborough in Buckinghamshire and Elizabeth Cromwell, aunt of Oliver Cromwell; his uncles included Richard Ingoldsby the regicide, and Sir Henry Ingoldsby, 1st Baronet. His father was granted substantial lands in County Limerick, and acquired other holdings in the same county by marriage: his main residence was Ballybricken Castle. He held a variety of official posts, both under Cromwell and after the Restoration.

Richard was commissioned as an army officer before 1670, but little more is heard of him until 1689. Given his family's republican background, and his family connection to Oliver Cromwell, it was natural that he should welcome the Glorious Revolution, although he inclined to Toryism in later life. He was appointed colonel in 1692 and adjutant-general for the expedition against France. In 1693 he was appointed colonel of the Royal Welch Fusiliers and commanded them at the Siege of Namur. In 1696 he became a brigadier general. He claimed to have suffered serious losses, amounting to £12000, as a result of his support for the Glorious Revolution and petitioned the English Parliament for redress.

He spent some time in Ireland, and was briefly imprisoned for his involvement in a duel between John Methuen, the Lord Chancellor of Ireland, and Thomas Fitzmaurice, 1st Earl of Kerry. King William III, anxious to avoid a scandal, quickly ordered his release.

During the War of the Spanish Succession he became major general and then lieutenant general. He commanded a division under Marlborough 1702–1706, and fought at the Battle of Schellenberg. At the Battle of Blenheim he was second in command of the first line under Charles Churchill. He became colonel of the Royal Irish Regiment in 1705. After 1707 he spent much of his time in Ireland, being by then incapacitated from active service after being seriously wounded. He combined military and political offices: he was commander of the Irish forces Comptroller of the Ordinance and Master of the Horse, and also sat in the Irish House of Commons as member for Limerick City, and wielded considerable political influence locally. Despite his support for the Revolution, he was now seen as a Tory in politics, as was the rest of the Dublin government at the time. He was an Irish Privy Counsellor and Lord Justice of Ireland 1709–10; a letter from Marlborough makes clear that this appointment was his doing, a sign of his personal regard for Ingoldsby. He became rich enough to buy Carton House, ancestral home of the Earl of Kildare, and was recommended for a Peerage shortly before his death.

Ingoldsby died in January 1712 and was buried after an impressive State funeral in Christ Church Cathedral. By his wife Frances Naper, daughter of Colonel James Naper of Loughcrew, County Meath, he had one son, Henry, who also served with the Royal Welch Fusiliers and as MP for Limerick City. He wasted most of his father's fortune on high living in London, and after his death, his heirs were forced to sell Carton back to the Earl of Kildare in 1738.

== Sources ==
- Lee, Sidney, ed. (1892). "Ingoldsby, Richard (d.1712)" . Dictionary of National Biography. Vol. 29. London: Smith, Elder & Co. p. 11.
- Walsh, Patrick A.; Beaumont, David "Ingoldsby, Richard" Cambridge Dictionary of National Biography 2009

Parliament of Ireland
Preceded by Sir Joseph Williamson; Joseph Coghlan	Member of Parliament for Limerick City; 1703–1712; With: Robert Blennerhassett	Succeeded by George Roche; Henry Ingoldsby
Military offices
Preceded by Sir John Morgan	Colonel of the Welch Regiment of Fuzileers; 1693–1705	Succeeded by Joseph Sabine
Preceded by Frederick Hamilton	Colonel of the Royal Irish Regiment; 1705–1712	Succeeded by Robert Stearne
