= Battle of Fontenoy =

1745 battle of the War of the Austrian Succession

- Part of the War of the Austrian Succession
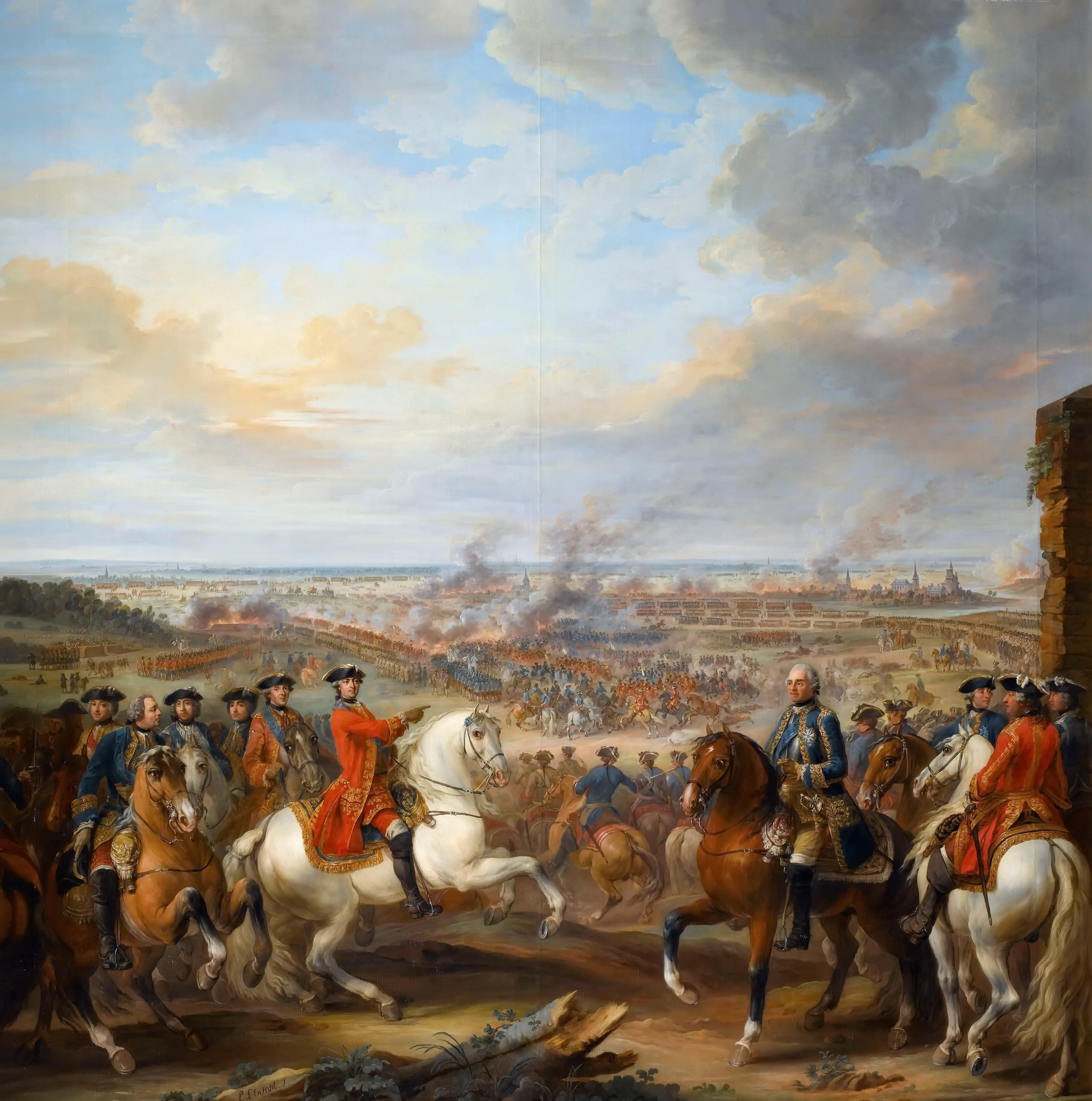
- 1745–1757 painting of the battle
Date	11 May 1745
Location	Fontenoy, Hainault, modern Belgium 50°33′58″N 3°28′48″E
Result	French victory

Belligerents
France	Great Britain; Dutch Republic; Hanover; Holy Roman Empire

Commanders and leaders
Maurice de Saxe; Count Löwendal; du Plessis; Gramont †; d'Estrées	Cumberland; Ligonier; James Campbell †; Waldeck; Isaac Cronström; Königsegg-Rothenfels

Strength
c. 50,000 troops; 100–110 guns	c. 50,000 troops; 80–101 guns

Casualties and losses
c. 8,000 killed or wounded	c. 7,400–12,000 killed, wounded or captured; 40 guns captured
- Location within Belgium Battle of Fontenoy (France)

The Battle of Fontenoy was fought on 11 May 1745 near Tournai in the Austrian Netherlands during the War of the Austrian Succession. A French army of 50,000 men under Marshal General Maurice de Saxe defeated a Pragmatic Army (Note: Supporters of the 1713 Pragmatic Sanction were generally known as the Pragmatic Allies) of 50,000 British, Hanoverian, Dutch and Austrian troops under Captain-general William Augustus, Duke of Cumberland.

By 1745 France was close to bankruptcy and seeking an end to the war. The Austrian Netherlands offered the best opportunity for a decisive victory, and in April Saxe led a French army to besiege Tournai, a key strategic town on the upper Scheldt, compelling the main Pragmatic Army in the region to march to the town's relief. Leaving 22,000 men to continue the siege, Saxe placed his main force about 8 kilometres (5 mi) away in the villages of Antoing, Vezon and Fontenoy, along a naturally strong feature strengthened with defensive works.

Following several unsuccessful Allied flank assaults an infantry column of 15,000 British and Hanoverian troops attacked the French centre but was repulsed. Covered by their cavalry the Allies retreated toward Brussels and abandoned Tournai, which fell shortly afterwards. Despite the French victory the war continued until the signing of the Treaty of Aix-la-Chapelle in November 1748.

== Background: 1740 to 1745 ==
Maria Theresa, whose succession to the Habsburg throne led to the war (1743 portrait by Jean-Étienne Liotard)

The War of the Austrian Succession was caused by the death in 1740 of Emperor Charles VI, ruler of the Holy Roman Empire. Since he had no sons, his eldest daughter Maria Theresa became heir, even though she was technically barred by Salic law which governed the Habsburg monarchy. (Note: Often referred to as 'Austria', this included Austria, Hungary, Croatia, Bohemia and the Austrian Netherlands) To ensure her succession, this condition was waived by the Pragmatic Sanction of 1713, a solution which was challenged by the closest male heir, Charles of Bavaria. In January 1742 Charles became the first non-Habsburg Emperor in 300 years, supported by France, Prussia and Saxony. Maria Theresa was backed by the Pragmatic Allies, a coalition of Austria, Britain, Hanover, and the Dutch Republic.

By 1745, the main beneficiary from four years of conflict was Prussia, which captured the Austrian province of Silesia during the 1740–1742 First Silesian War. The richest province in the Empire, Silesian taxes provided ten per cent of total Imperial income and contained large mining, weaving and dyeing industries. Regaining it was a priority for Maria Theresa and led to the 1744–1745 Second Silesian War. Shortly after Charles died in January 1745, the Austrians over-ran Bavaria and defeated a Franco-Bavarian force at Pfaffenhofen on 15 April. Charles' son, Maximilian III Joseph, now sued for peace and supported the election of Maria Theresa's husband, Francis Stephen, as the new Emperor. With Bavaria out of the war, Austria could focus on Silesia, while France was released from its involvement in Germany, and could concentrate on Italy and the Low Countries.

== 1745 campaign plans ==
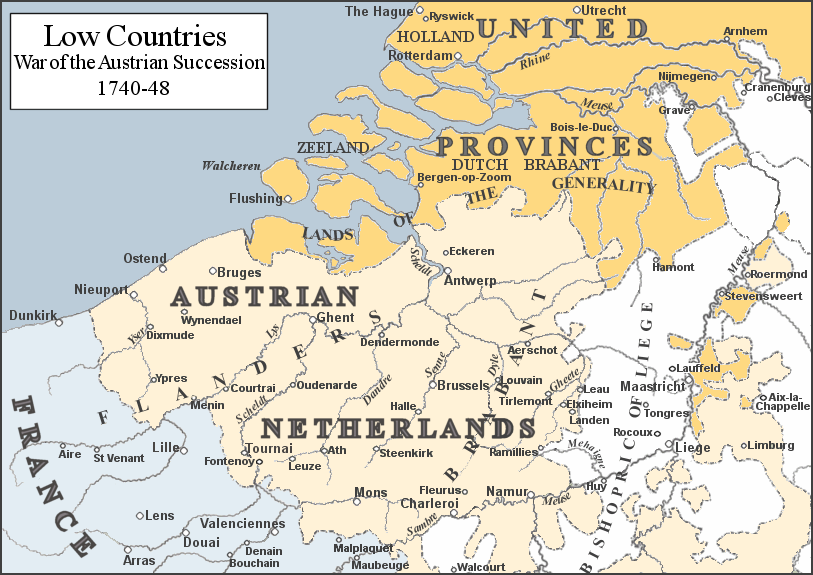
The Austrian Netherlands, showing its major waterways; Tournai sat on the Scheldt River (top), near the border with France

In the first half of 1744, France made significant advances in the Austrian Netherlands, before being forced to divert resources to meet threats elsewhere. For the 1745 campaign, Maurice de Saxe persuaded Louis XV it was the best place to inflict a decisive defeat on Britain, whose financial resources were central to the Allied war effort. His plan was to bring the Allies to battle on a ground of his choosing, before British financial strength could be used to fund extra troops and negate the current French superiority in numbers. Saxe also benefitted from a unified command and strategy, unlike the Allies who were often deeply divided over objectives and priorities.

Most of the fighting in this region took place in what is often referred to as Flanders, a compact area 160 kilometres (100 mi) wide, its highest point only 100 metres (110 yd) above sea level and dominated by rivers running southwest to northeast. Until the advent of railways in the 19th century, bulk goods and supplies were transported by water, and wars in this region were fought for control of major waterways, including the rivers Lys, Sambre and Meuse.

The most important of these was the Scheldt, which began in Northern France and ran for 350 kilometres (220 mi) before entering the North Sea at Antwerp. Saxe planned to attack Tournai, a town close to the French border which controlled access to the upper Scheldt basin, making it a vital link in the trading network for Northern Europe. With a garrison of over 8,000, it was also the strongest of the Dutch Barrier Treaty forts in the Austrian Netherlands, factors Saxe hoped would force the Allies to fight for it.

In March 1745, George Wade was replaced as Allied commander in Flanders by the 24-year-old Duke of Cumberland, advised by the experienced Earl Ligonier. In addition to British and Hanoverian troops, the Pragmatic Army included a large Dutch contingent, commanded by Prince Waldeck, with a small number of Austrians, led by Count Königsegg-Rothenfels. However, a coherent Allied strategy was undermined by internal disputes and different objectives. The British and Hanoverians resented and mistrusted each other, Austria did not consider Flanders a military priority and Waldeck was unpopular with his subordinates, who often disputed his orders. These divisions were exacerbated by Cumberland's inexperience, lack of diplomatic skill and tendency to ignore advice.

On 21 April, a French cavalry detachment under D'Estrées feinted towards Mons and Cumberland prepared to march to its relief. Although it soon became clear this was a diversion, French intentions remained unclear until the siege of Tournai began on 28 April. Combined with faulty intelligence that estimated Saxe had less than 30,000 men, this meant the Allies advanced on Tournai with only their field army of 50,000, leaving large garrisons at nearby Namur and Charleroi. Having confirmed the Allies were approaching from the south-east, on 7 May Saxe left 22,000 men to continue the siege, and placed his main force of 50,000 (Note: Generally accepted figure, although other estimates range from 46,000 to 60,000 (Note: Browning 1975, pp. 212, 392; Duncan 1879, p. 127; Townshend 1901, pp. 51–52; Black 1998, p. 66; Weigley 1991, p. 204; Van Nimwegen 2002, p. 222; Castex 2012, p. 99)) around the villages of Fontenoy and Antoing, eight kilometres (5 mi) from Tournai.

== Battle ==
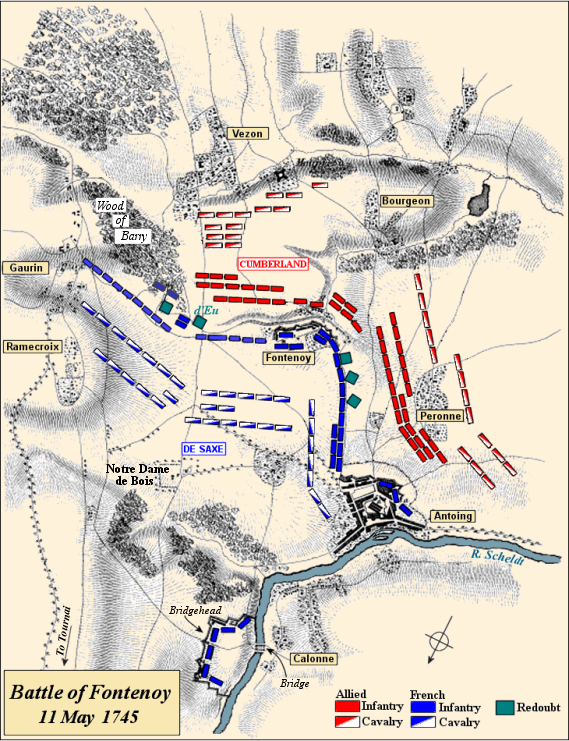
French (blue); Allies (red)

As Saxe considered his infantry inferior to their opponents, he placed them behind defensive works and fortified the villages. The French line ran along the crest of a plateau, the right flank resting on the Scheldt, the left stationed behind the Bois de Barry, with the Redoubt d'Eu and Redoubt de Chambonas covering the gap between the wood and their centre in the village of Fontenoy. From there, the Chemin de Mons sloped down to the hamlets of Vezon and Bourgeon below, exposing any frontal attack to prolonged fire from three sides.

The Allies made contact with the French outposts on the evening of 9 May, but a hasty reconnaissance by Cumberland and his staff failed to spot the Redoubt d'Eu. On 10 May, British and Hanoverian cavalry under James Campbell pushed the French out of Vezon and Bourgeon. Campbell's deputy, the Earl of Crawford, then recommended that infantry be sent to clear the Bois de Barry, while the cavalry swung around it to outflank the French left. Unfortunately, this plan was abandoned when Dutch hussars reconnoitring the route were fired on by French troops in the wood and withdrew.

The attack was postponed until the following day, both armies camping overnight on their positions. At 4:00 a.m. on 11 May, the Allies formed up, British and Hanoverians on the right and centre, Dutch on the left, with the Austrians in reserve. The Dutch were ordered to take Fontenoy and Antoing, while a brigade under Richard Ingoldsby captured the Redoubt de Chambonas, and cleared the Bois de Barry. Once both flanks were engaged, massed Allied infantry in the centre under Ligonier would advance up the slope, and dislodge the main French army.

As soon as it was light, the Allied artillery opened fire on Fontenoy, but the bombardment had little effect on the dug-in French infantry. Because Cumberland had badly under-estimated French numbers, he assumed their main force was in the centre, and failed to appreciate the strength of the flanking positions. This meant the true strength of the French left only became apparent when at 6 a.m. Ingoldsby ran into the Redoubt d'Eu. He requested artillery support, and the advance halted while his men skirmished in the woods with light troops known as Harquebusiers de Grassins. Although these probably numbered less than 900, Ingoldsby was uncertain of their strength and advanced with extreme caution. This was understandable given the earlier failure to detect the redoubt, but delayed the main attack.

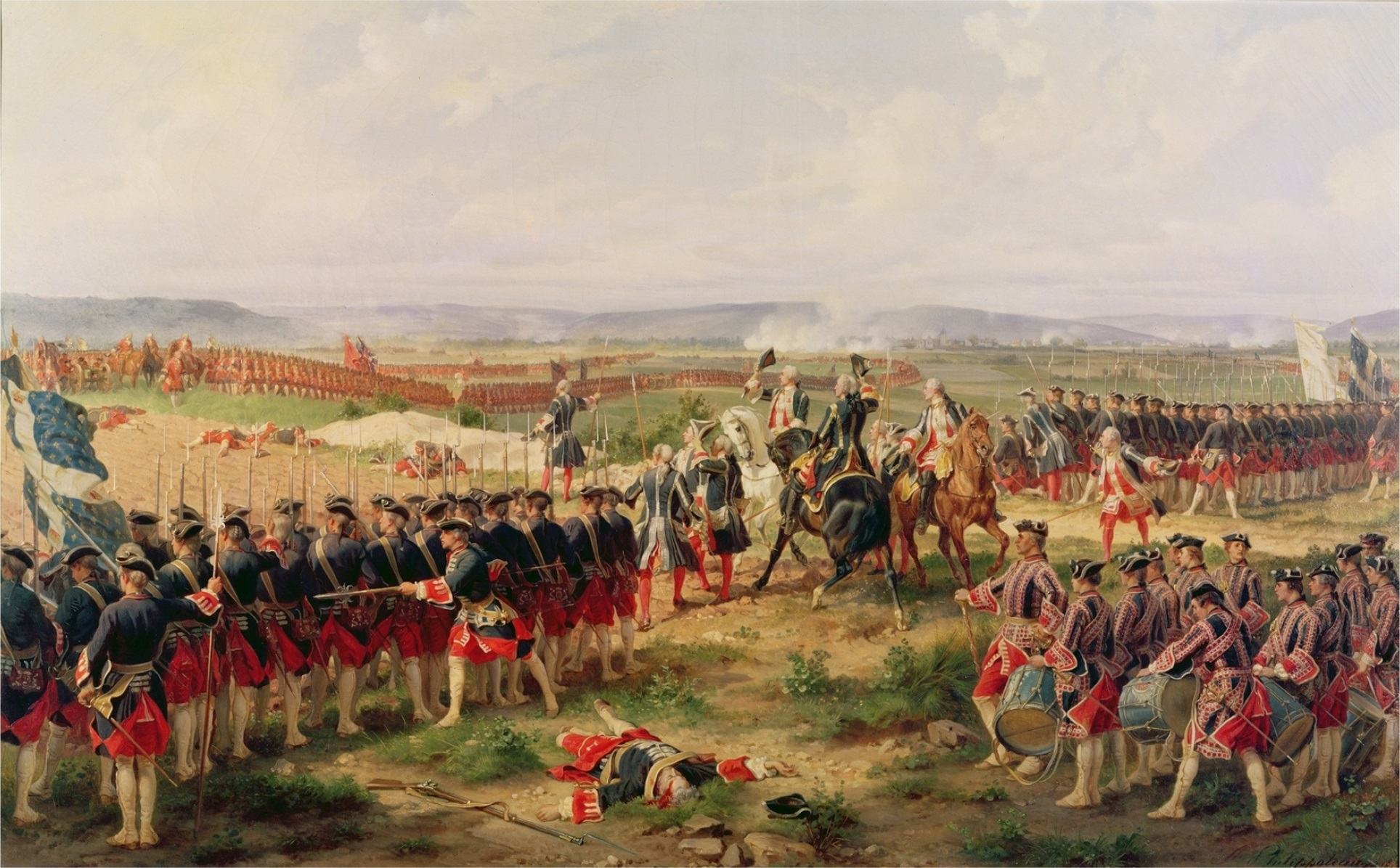
The French Guards Regiment and the 1st Regiment of Foot Guards invite each other to fire first

Ingoldsby's brigade was irresolutely handled and halted time after time; and after waiting as long as possible, Campbell's cavalry moved forward and spread out across the plain, immediately becoming an excellent target of the French cannonade that killed its commander and drove it back. Growing impatient, at 7:00 a.m., Cumberland ordered Ingoldsby to abandon his assault on the Redoubt d'Eu and join the main column, although he failed to inform Ligonier. As the Dutch advanced on Fontenoy, they were fired on by French troops in the nearby walled cemetery and fell back with heavy losses. At 9:00 a.m., Ligonier sent an aide instructing Ingoldsby to attack the Redoubt d'Eu immediately and was apparently horrified when Ingoldsby shared his change of orders. At 10:30 a.m., the Dutch assaulted Fontenoy again, supported by the 42nd Foot; after some initial success, they were forced to retreat, and at 12:30 p.m., Cumberland ordered the central column forward.

Thought to comprise some 15,000 infantry, the column advanced up the slope led by Cumberland and Ligonier, and despite heavy casualties reached the French position still in formation. After halting to dress their lines, the Guards in the first rank allegedly invited the Gardes Françaises to open fire. First reported by Voltaire in 1768, there is some doubt as to the reliability of this anecdote, but the opening volley was considered so important that commanders often preferred their opponents to go first, particularly if their own troops were well disciplined and thus able to absorb it without losing cohesion. (Note: The British incurred heavy losses at Dettingen in 1743 by firing prematurely, and subsequent training focused heavily on the importance of getting close before the first volley)

Thus goaded, the Gardes fired prematurely, greatly reducing the impact of their first volley. That of the British killed or wounded 700 to 800 men, and the French front line broke up in confusion. Many of their reserves had been transferred to meet the Dutch attack on Fontenoy, and the Allies now advanced into this gap. Seeing this, Noailles, who was observing the fighting from a position near Notre Dame de Bois along with Louis XV and his son, implored the king to seek safety. However, Saxe assured Louis the battle was not lost, while Löwendal ordered a series of cavalry attacks, which although poorly co-ordinated forced the Allies back.

Isolated in the middle of the column, Cumberland had lost control of the main battle and made no attempt to relieve pressure on the Allied centre by ordering fresh attacks on Fontenoy or the Redoubt d'Eu. Under fire from both flanks and in front, the column formed itself into a hollow, three sided square, reducing their firepower advantage. Their cavalry charges gave the French infantry time to reform, and at 14:00 Saxe brought up his remaining artillery, which began firing into the Allied square at close range. This was followed by a general assault, with the d'Aubeterre, du Roi, Royal and de la Couronne attacking from the right, the Irish Brigade, des Vaisseaux, Normandie, d'Eu and two battalions of the Gardes françaises from the left.

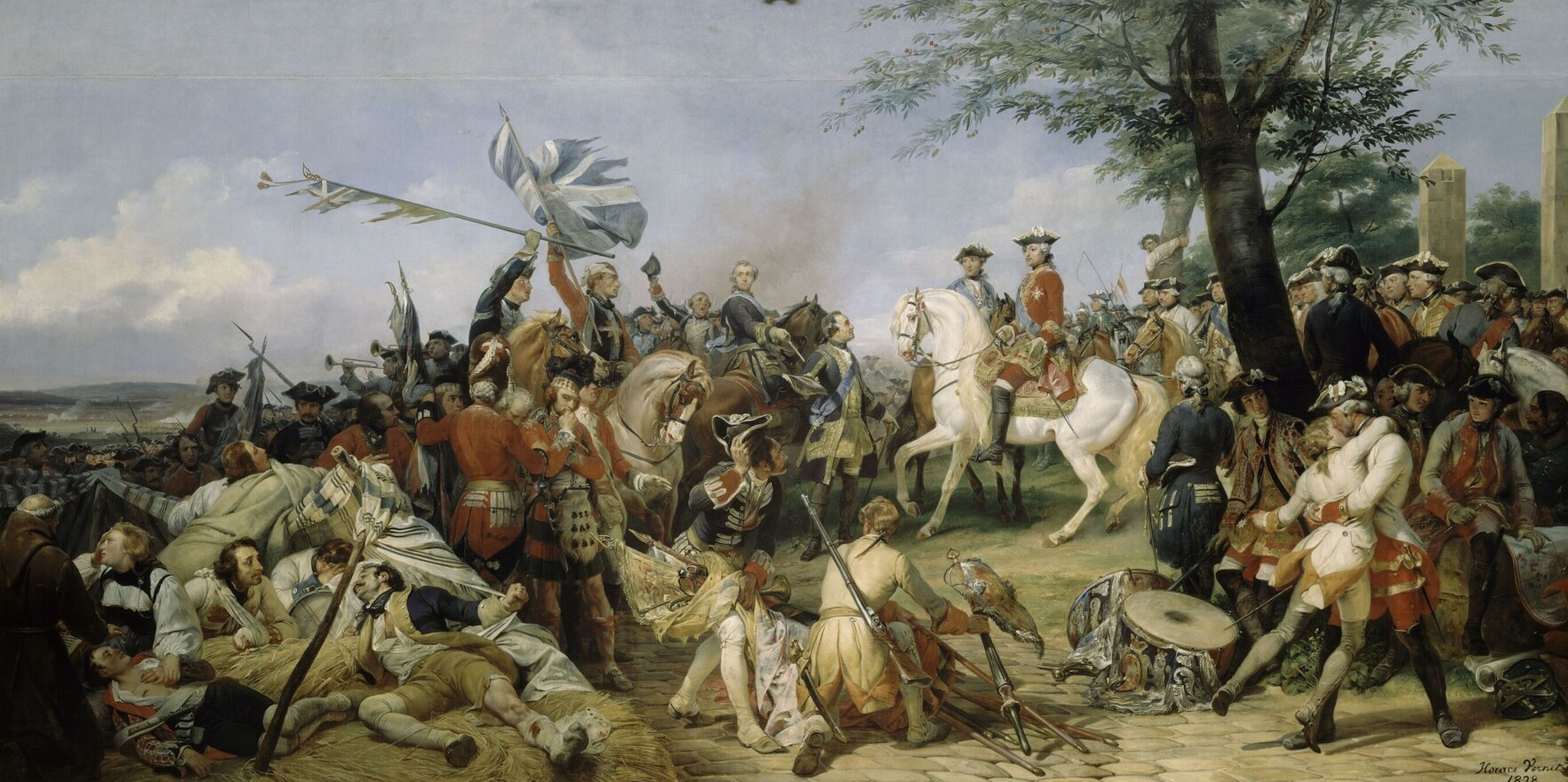
The Battle of Fontenoy by Horace Vernet, 1828. Captured British colours are being presented to Louis XV and his son, the Dauphin

The assault incurred heavy casualties, the Aubeterre regiment losing 328 wounded or killed, the four battalions of the Régiment Royal a total of 675, and the Irish Brigade 656. (Note: "The encounter between the British and Irish Brigade was fierce, the fire constant, and the slaughter great; but the loss on the side of the British was such, they were at length compelled to retire".) Despite this, Saxe and Löwendal led the Gardes Françaises in a second attack, while D'Estrées and Richelieu brought up the elite Maison du roi cavalry, forcing the column back with heavy losses. The Hanoverian Böselager regiment suffered 377 casualties, the largest of any single Allied unit, the 23rd Foot lost 322, and the three Guards regiments over 700 in total.

Despite this, discipline and training allowed the Allied infantry to make an orderly withdrawal, the rearguard halting at intervals to fire on their pursuers. On reaching Vezon, the cavalry provided cover as they moved into columns of march, before withdrawing 180 kilometres (110 mi) to Ath, largely undisturbed by the French. The decision was opposed by Waldeck and other Dutch officers, who were reluctant to abandon their garrison in Tournai; one of them later wrote that "We were repulsed without being [defeated but ...] our hasty retreat makes us look beaten ...[while] we have left [much] baggage and many wounded". Next day, French cavalry captured 2,000 wounded Allied soldiers at Leuze, along with forty-four guns.

== Aftermath ==
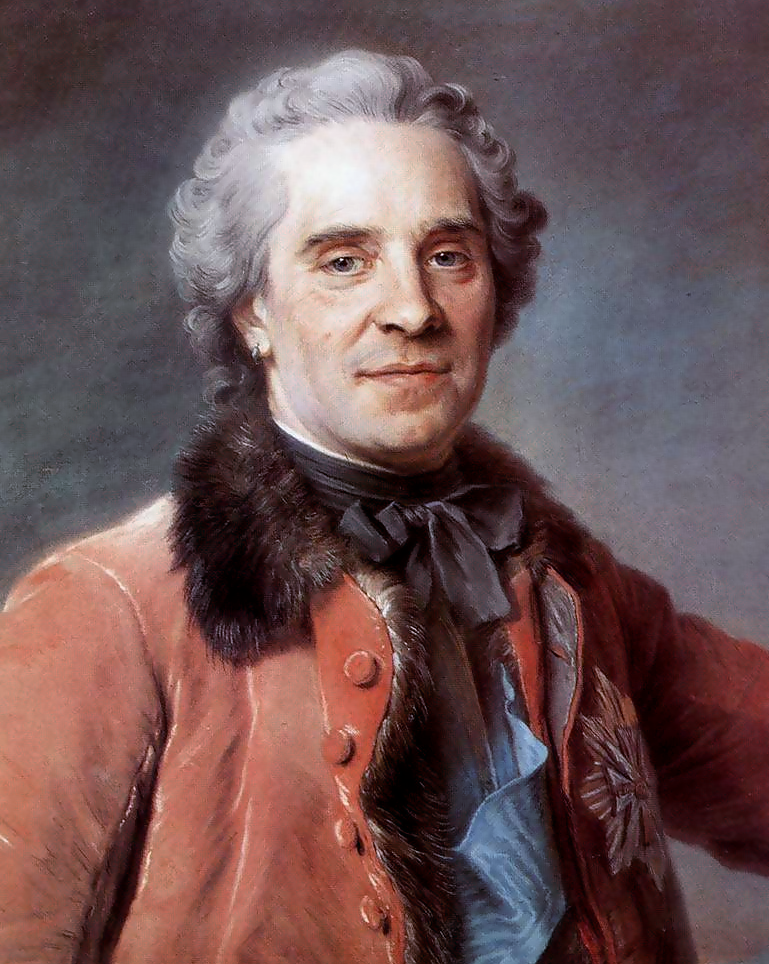
Maurice de Saxe; despite being in severe pain, his leadership was key to French victory

Fontenoy was the bloodiest battle in Western Europe since Malplaquet in 1709. French losses were an estimated 7,000 to 8,000 killed and wounded, those of the Allies between 7,400 (Note: British and Hanoverian 5,800, Dutch 1,600) and 12,000, including prisoners. Since his presence technically made him senior commander, Louis became the first French king to claim a battlefield victory over the English since Saint Louis. This fact was emphasised in a propaganda campaign, which included a laudatory poem by Voltaire, titled La Bataille De Fontenoy.

Victory restored French battlefield pre-eminence in Europe, although the best of the Allied infantry remained superior to their opponents. It also cemented Saxe's reputation as one of the leading generals of the period, although his domestic opponents attacked him for not pursuing with more vigour. In response, he pointed out his troops were exhausted while the Allied cavalry and large parts of their infantry remained intact and fresh. These critics did not include either Louis XV or Frederick the Great, who viewed Fontenoy as a tactical masterpiece and invited Saxe to Sanssouci to discuss it.

On the other hand, Cumberland performed poorly as a commander, ignoring advice from his more experienced subordinates, failing to ensure the Bois de Barry was properly cleared and issuing Ingoldsby with conflicting orders. Although praised for his courage, the inactivity of the Allied cavalry was partly due to his participation in the infantry attack, and loss of strategic oversight. Ligonier and others viewed Fontenoy as a "defeat snatched from the jaws of victory" and although understandable for a 24-year-old in his first major engagement, the same faults were apparent at the Battle of Lauffeld in 1747.

In the recriminations that followed, Ingoldsby was court martialled for the delay in attacking the Redoubt d'Eu, although his claim to have received inconsistent orders was clearly supported by the evidence. He himself was wounded, while the largest casualties of any units involved were incurred by two regiments from his brigade, the 12th Foot and Böselager's. The court concluded his actions arose 'from an error of judgement, not want of courage', but he was forced out of the army, a decision many considered unjust. Cumberland and some of his staff also blamed the Dutch for not relieving pressure on the centre by continuing their attack on Fontenoy. Dutch cavalry commander Casimir van Schlippenbach echoed this criticism, although failure was largely due to the confusion caused by Cumberland himself, while the Dutch infantry retreated in good order.

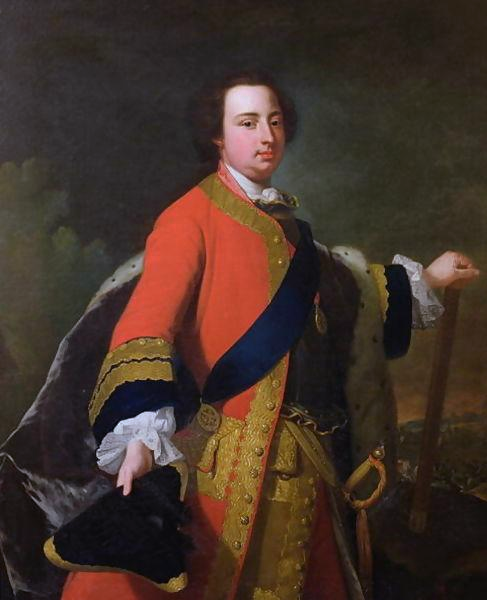
Allied commander Cumberland, whose personal courage was offset by poor battlefield control

Regardless, Waldeck was critical of the lack of initiative displayed by his troops, as was Isaac Cronström, head of the Dutch infantry. Born in 1661, the latter fought at Malplaquet, where the Dutch had continued to attack French entrenchments despite incurring very heavy casualties. In a letter to Grand Pensionary Anthonie van der Heim, he noted "these troops are [not] like those in the previous war", while in his official report to the States General, Waldeck claimed "the famous old Dutch courage" had gone. These conclusions led to an intensive programme of retraining, and the Dutch performed significantly better at Rocoux in 1746. However, the war confirmed the decline of the Dutch Republic as a Great Power; Newcastle, whose foreign policy had assumed the opposite, later berated himself for his "ignorance, obstinacy, and credulity", in believing otherwise.

With no hope of relief, Tournai surrendered on 20 June, followed by the loss of Ostend and Nieuport; in October, the British were forced to divert resources to deal with the Jacobite rising of 1745, allowing Saxe to continue his advance in 1746. Despite the presence of Dutch troops in the Pragmatic Army, France did not declare war on the Dutch Republic itself until 1747. This decision made their financial situation even worse, since French merchants had evaded the British naval blockade by transporting their goods in "neutral" Dutch ships. By the end of 1747, France had occupied most of the Austrian Netherlands and was on the verge of advancing into Dutch territory, but their economy was being strangled by the blockade, which was also causing widespread food shortages. Peace was a matter of extreme urgency and despite the huge military and financial costs incurred, under the 1748 Treaty of Aix-la-Chapelle Louis XV agreed to evacuate the Austrian Netherlands for minimal return, leading to a popular French phrase "as stupid as the Peace".

=== Legacy ===
The participation of the Irish Brigade and the casualties incurred led 19th and early 20th-century Irish nationalists to portray Fontenoy as the "pinnacle of Irish military valour", with the battle giving its name to a variety of streets, buildings and athletic clubs. In 1905, nationalist author Richard Barry O'Brien founded a committee to fund an Irish Brigade memorial in the village of Fontenoy, where it still features in annual commemorations of the battle.

When surveying the battlefield, Louis XV reportedly said: "See how much blood a triumph costs. The blood of our enemies is still the blood of men. The true glory is to save it." In 1968, the French army installed a memorial in the neighbouring town of Vezon which bears this quotation.
