= The Peculiar Sensation of Being Pat Ingoldsby =

Irish documentary film

- Directed by: Seamus Murphy
- Produced by: Tom Burke
- Cinematography: Seamus Murphy
- Edited by: Sebastian Gollek
- Music by: Andrew Murphy
- Production companies: Broadstone Films; Fís Éireann
- Distributed by: Break Out Pictures
- Release date: 4 November 2022
- Running time: 97 minutes
- Country: Ireland
- Language: English

The Peculiar Sensation of Being Pat Ingoldsby is a 2022 Irish documentary film directed by Seamus Murphy, concerning the life and inspirations of Irish poet and TV presenter Pat Ingoldsby.

== Premise ==
Pat Ingoldsby was an eccentric Irish television presenter best known for his children's programmes in the 1980s, including Pat's Hat, Pat's Pals and Pat's Chat. Until recently, he was a familiar figure on the streets of Dublin, where he sold copies of his many books of poetry.

The Peculiar Sensation of Being Pat Ingoldsby explores the idiosyncratic world of Ingoldsby. The film intersperses his poems with candid anecdotes that reflect his deep, visceral connection to Dublin, its people, and anything that captured his interest.

Loosely chronological in nature, the documentary begins with the writer's childhood in Malahide, where he suffered with polio and spent a lot of his time on the family sofa listening to BBC Radio and looking out at the other children playing on Malahide Green. The film moves on to his time spent "riding the rails in between jobs" in England before finding employment in a Vauxhall factory in Luton where he would stay for three years. He had the first of several nervous breakdowns in the 1960s.

Featuring interviews with Ingoldsby's family as well as a select number of additional interviewees, the documentary builds a portrait of Ingoldsby in his own words, in conversation and verse. The film chronicles Ingoldsby's "descent into mental illness", which is twinned with his own sense of being out of place, a feeling that was ultimately conquered by Gestalt Therapy; "that vocal offshoot of psychoanalytic practice". Until the documentary, Ingoldsby had not been interviewed on camera since 1993's Between Stations. Ingoldsby ultimately credits Gestalt therapy with breaking his cycle of psychiatric care and helping him to become a more "healthy, well-rounded, balanced person."

== Release ==
The Peculiar Sensation of Being Pat Ingoldsby was released in Ireland in November 2022, and was screened as part of the Irish Film Institute's Documentary Festival 2022.

== Reception ==
The Irish Film Institute described the film as "a moving and entertaining portrait of a maverick who has faced personal challenges with apparent equanimity finding balm in his writing which infuses the banality of the everyday with surreal humour".
