= Isaac Cronström =

Dutch States Army officer and nobleman (1661–1751)

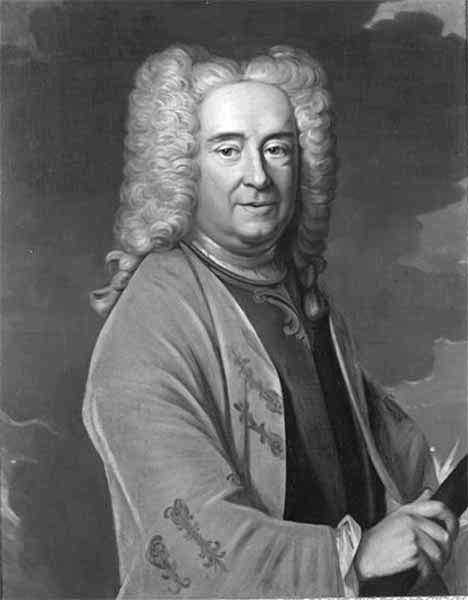

Personal details
- Born: 3 July 1661 Avesta, Sweden
- Died: 31 July 1751 (aged 90) Kasteel Nemerlaer, Dutch Republic
- Occupation: Soldier and General

Military service
- Battles/wars: War of the Reunions; Nine Years' War; Battle of Landen; Siege of Namur; War of the Spanish Succession; Siege of Kaiserswerth; Siege of Liège; Siege of Huy; Siege of Tournai; Battle of Malplaquet; Siege of Douai; Siege of Béthune; Saint-Venant; Siege of Aire; Jacobite rising of 1715; War of the Austrian Succession; Battle of Fontenoy; Siege of Bergen op Zoom

Isaac Cronström (3 July 1661 – 31 July 1751) was a Dutch States Army officer and nobleman. In the Dutch Republic, he was most known for his leadership role during the Siege of Bergen op Zoom.

== Early life and personal life ==
Cronström was a son of councillor and chamberlain Isaac Cronström (1620–1679) and Kristina Hanssen. After his father's death, Cronström travelled through Europe on a study tour and was registered as a student at Leipzig in 1679, Leiden in 1680 and Paris in 1681. In 1683, he joined the Swedish army and served a large part of this time in the army in France. During his time in France he took part in the War of the Reunions and he fought in Catalonia. After nine years of service, Cronström had reached the position of captain. He then returned to Sweden and served under Charles XI of Sweden. The latter sent him into the service of the Austrians and in 1692 into the Army of the Dutch Republic. During that time he married Trajectina Anna Elisabeth van Tuyll van Serooskerken (1675–1720), daughter of Hendrik Jacob van Tuyll van Serooskerken (1642–1692) and Anna Elisabeth van Reede (1652–1682), in 1695. Of their children, two daughters and two sons reached adulthood.

== Later life and service in the Dutch army ==
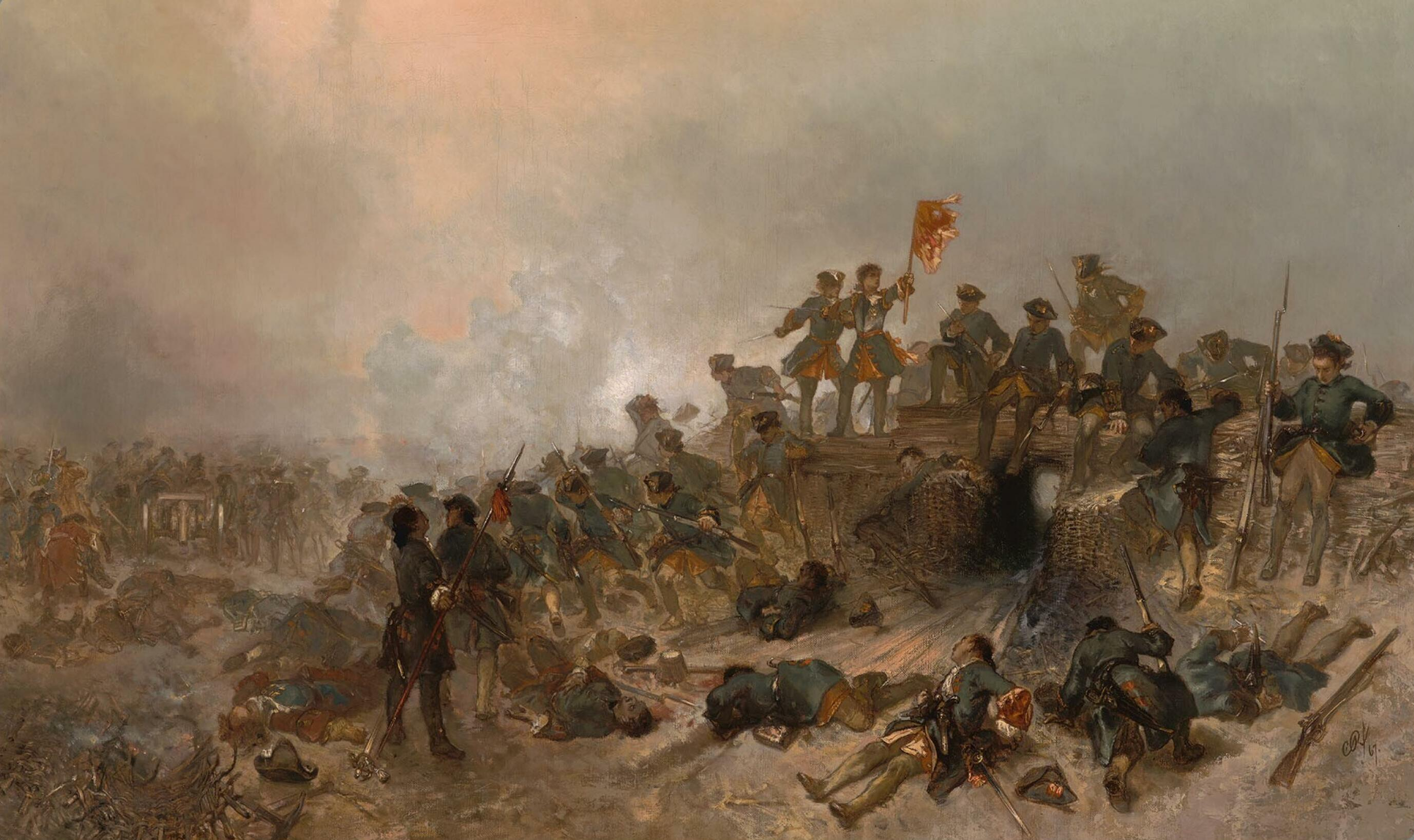
Dutch troops at the Battle of Malplaquet.

In 1692, during the Nine Years' War, Cronström he became one of the commanders of the Swedish soldiers in Dutch service. As such he took part in the Battle of Landen and the Siege of Namur in 1695. In 1697 he was promoted to Lieutenant Colonel and put in charge of the Weede regiment. At the start of the War of the Spanish Succession in 1702, he was present at the Siege of Kaiserswerth under the Prince of Nassau-Usingen. In 1703, he helped captured Liege, under the command of Menno van Coehoorn. It earned him the rank of colonel. From 1704 to 1715, he was State commander of the city of Huy, in the Prince-Bishopric of Liège. In that capacity he defended Huy for 3 weeks against a French army in 1705 before surrendering it. After a few days the city was again in Allied hands and he resumed his command. In between his command of Huy, Cronström was promoted to sergeant and fought in the Battle of Malplaquet in which he was wounded. Later, he became one of the commanders of a Dutch regiment in Scotland to support King George I of Great Britainduring the Jacobite rising of 1715. Frederick I of Sweden, who had met Cronström during the War of the Spanish Succession, elevated him to the peerage on his accession to the throne in 1720 and gave him the title of baron. In that year, Cronström also became governor of the fortress of Veurne and later governor of Ypres. He subsequently made further promotion in 1733 to lieutenant general and in 1742 he became general.

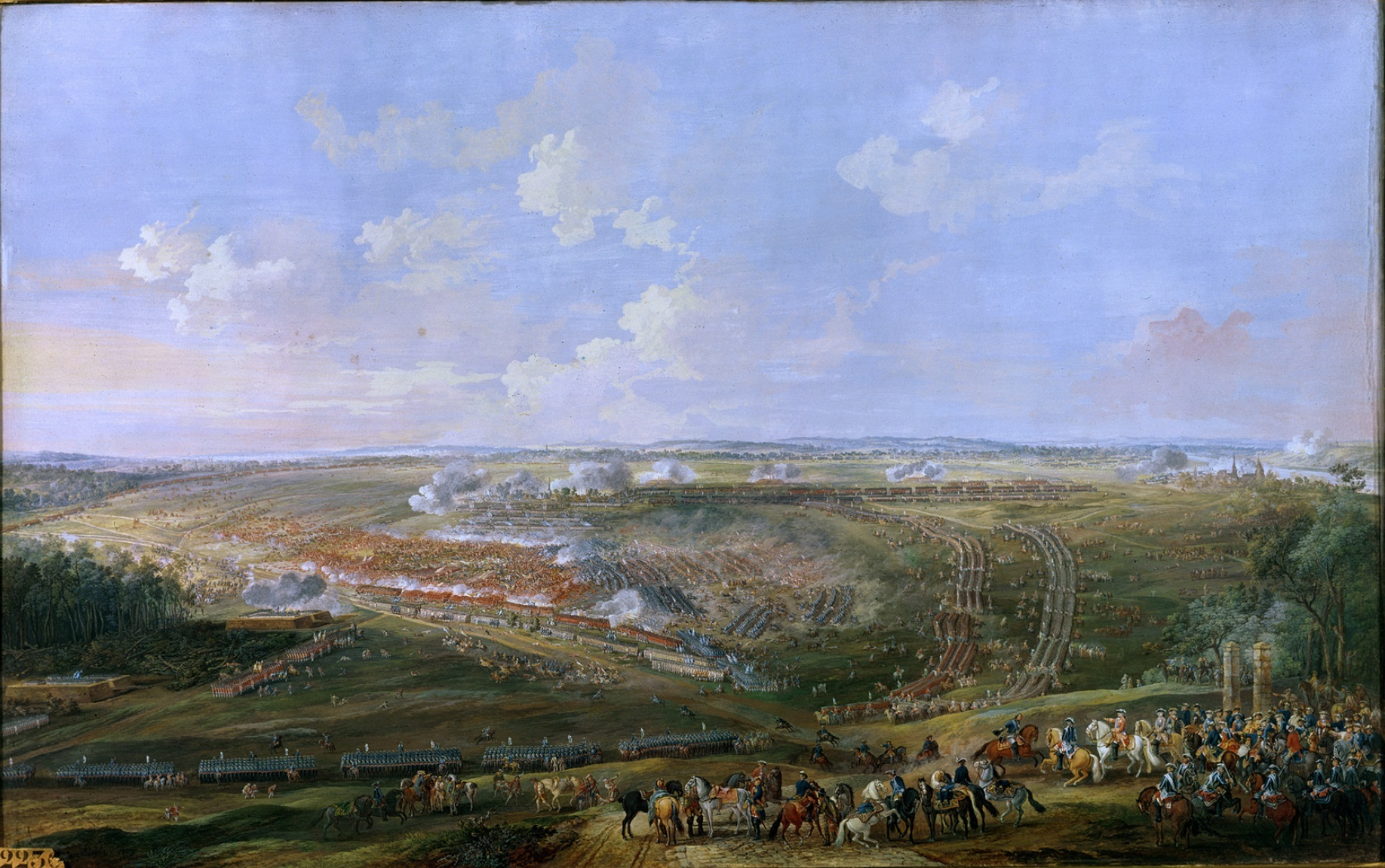
The Battle of Fontenoy, 1745.

He commanded all the Dutch infantry in 1744, the first year of Dutch participation in the War of the Austrian Succession, but soon asked to be relieved of his position due to disputes over the chosen strategy with the allied supreme commander, George Wade. Cronström was replaced by the Prince of Waldeck while George Wade was also soon relieved of command due to his unpopularity. Cronström however still commanded troops at the Battle of Fontenoy. After which he and Waldeck were unsatisfied with the performance of the Dutch army. Cronström wrote to the Dutch Grand Pensionary, Anthonie van der Heim that "You should not think, sir, that these troops are like those in the previous war." These conclusions led Waldeck and Cronström to improve the quality of the army significantly in a short amount of time. A year later in 1746 at the Battle of Rocoux, the Dutch infantry received much praise for its actions. In August 1747, Cronström became governor of 's-Hertogenbosch, but the vice-governor, General Samuel de Constant Rebecque (1676–1756), assumed command. In 1747, Cronström applied to be relieved of all his duties; he was 86 years old at the time. However, the Dutch government appealed to him to take command at the Siege of Bergen op Zoom. The fortress was taken by the French after more than two months. Cronström was held responsible for this, but was not convicted. He died at his castle on the Nemelaer estate at the age of 90.

== Bibliography ==
- Dubois, Pierre; Dubois, Simone (1993). Zonder Vaandel - Belle van Zuylen: Een biografie (in Dutch). Van Oorschot.
- Blok, P.J.; Molhuysen, P.C. (1911). "Isaac Cronström". Nieuw Nederlandsch Biografisch Woordenboek (NNBW). Deel 1.
- Van Nimwegen, Olaf (2002). De Republiek der Verenigde Nederlanden als grote mogendheid: Buitenlandse politiek en oorlogvoering in de eerste helft van de achttiende eeuw en in het bijzonder tijdens de Oostenrijkse Successieoorlog (1740–1748) (in Dutch). De Bataafsche Leeuw. ISBN 978-90-6707-540-4.
