= Pat Ingoldsby =

Irish poet and television presenter (1942–2025)

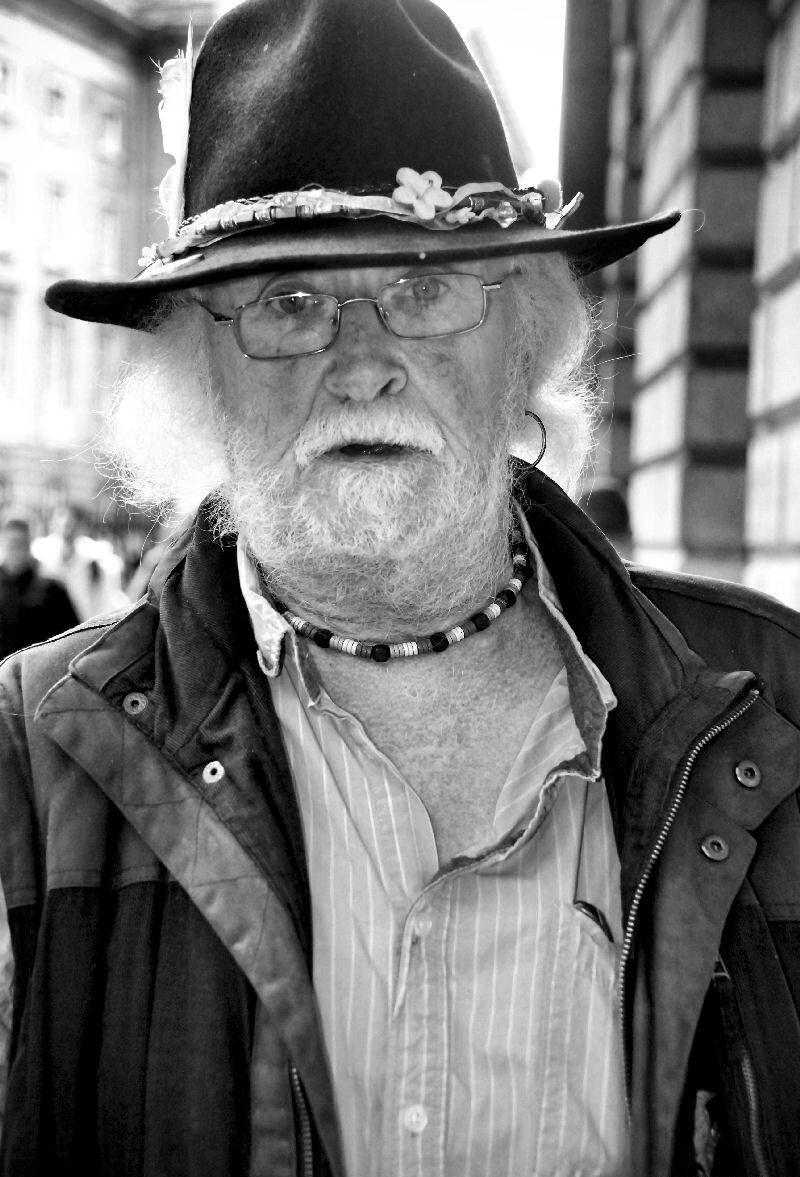
- Ingoldsby in 2013
- Born: Patrick Ingoldsby; 25 August 1942; Malahide, County Dublin, Ireland
- Died: 1 March 2025 (aged 82); Clontarf, Dublin, Ireland
- Occupations: Television host; columnist; poet
- Relatives: Maeve Ingoldsby (cousin)
- Writing career
- Language: English, Irish
- Period: 1977–2025
- Website: www.patingoldsby.org

Signature
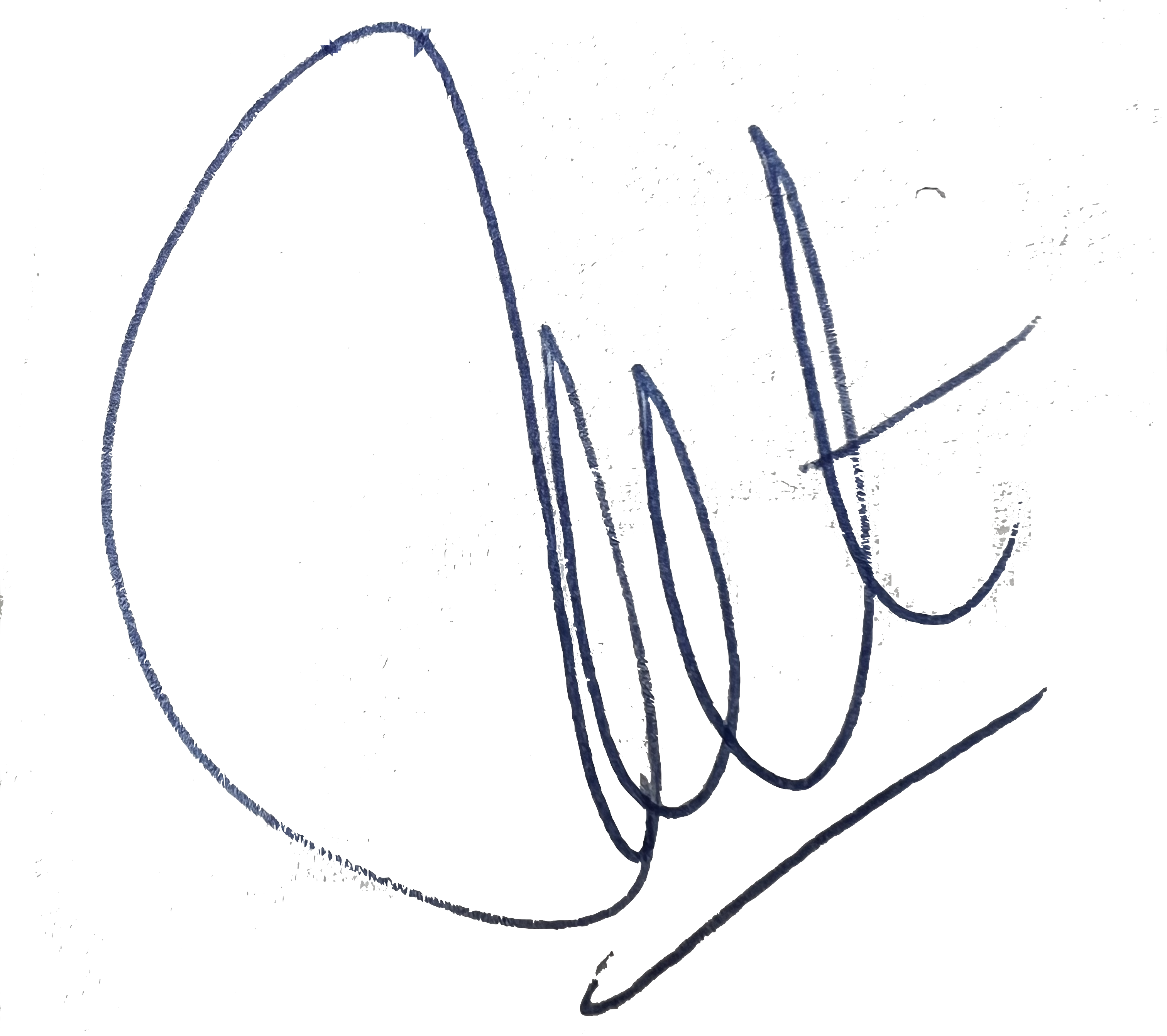

Patrick Ingoldsby (25 August 1942 – 1 March 2025) was an Irish poet and television presenter. He hosted children's television shows, wrote plays for the stage and for radio, published books of short stories and was a newspaper columnist. From the mid-1990s, he withdrew from the mass media and was most widely known for his collections of poetry, and his selling of them on the streets of Dublin (usually on Westmoreland Street or College Green).

== Early life ==
Ingoldsby was born in Malahide, County Dublin on 25 August 1942. He survived childhood polio and suffered its after-effects throughout his life. The playwright Maeve Ingoldsby was his second cousin.

== Career ==
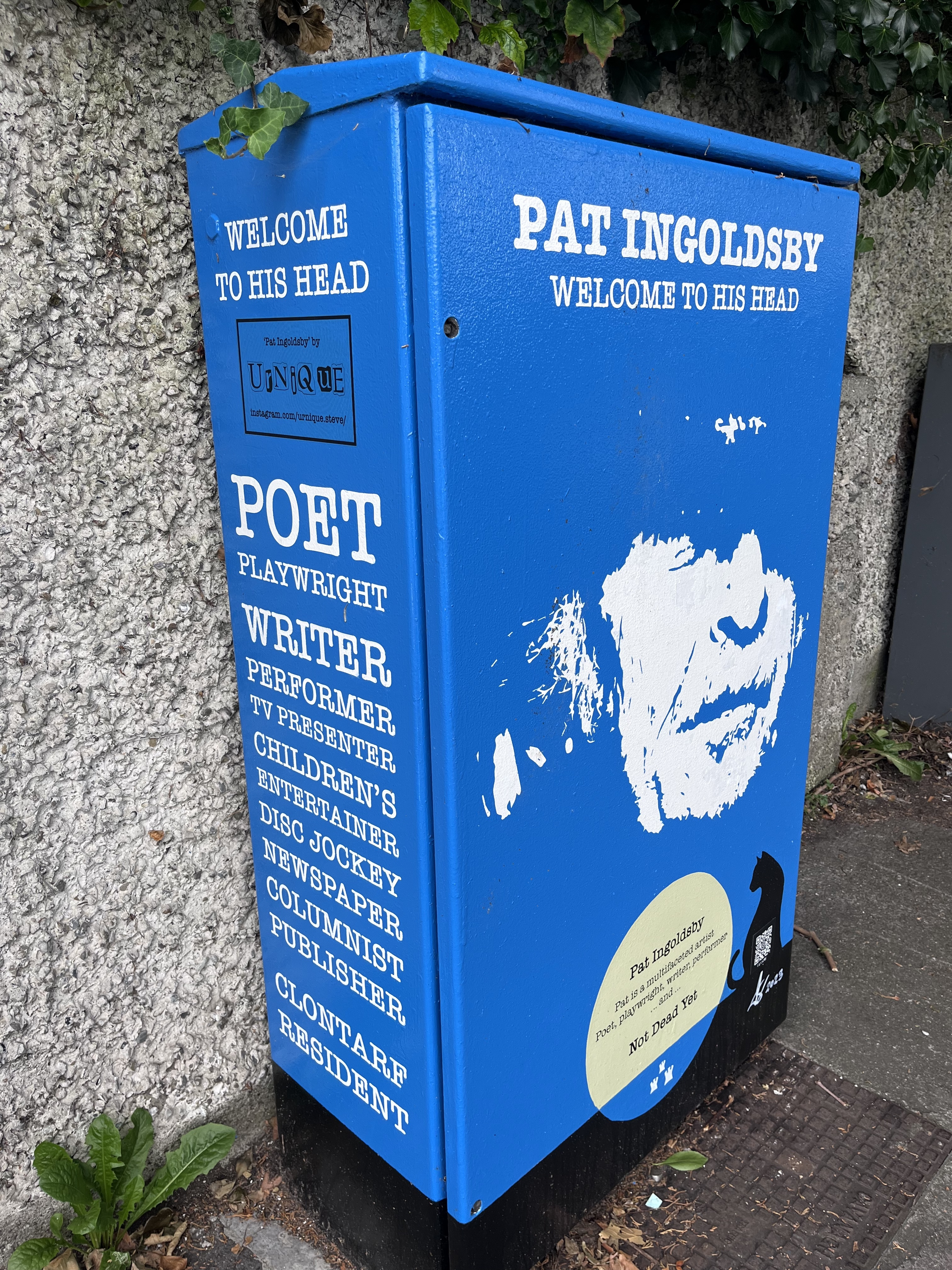
Pat Ingoldsby tribute box art by Steve O'Toole at the corner of Kincora Road in Clontarf, Dublin

In the 1980s, Ingoldsby hosted RTÉ children's television shows named Pat's Hat, Pat's Chat, and Pat's Pals. His plays include Bats or Booze or Both (Dublin, Project Arts Centre, 1977); Hisself (Dublin, Peacock Theatre, 1978); Rhymin' Simon (Peacock Theatre, 1978); When Am I Getting' Me Clothes (Peacock Theatre, 1978); Yeukface the Yeuk and the Spotty Grousler (Peacock, 1982); and The Full Shilling (Dublin, Gaeity Theatre, 1986). In the early 1990s, he had a column in the Evening Press (a now-defunct national Irish newspaper). These columns were later collected in The Peculiar Sensation of Being Irish. Ingoldsby was a fluent Irish speaker and included a few poems written in Irish in each book of poetry. He lived in Clontarf in Dublin. Sometime in the mid-1990s, he withdrew from TV, radio and theatre, instead devoting his efforts to poetry. He nevertheless remained part of Ireland's arts scene, sometimes opening art exhibitions, introducing then-new musicians such as David Gray or launching other people's books. He self-published through Willow Publications, which he set up in 1994. Some of his books, from 1998, carried a note that they were protected by the "Bratislava Accord 1993, section 2 cre/009 manifest-minsk", the terms of which allegedly protected his books' content from being included in "school textbooks", "examinations", "elocution classes" and "anything with the word 'Arts' in it". During the rapid increase in the use of mobile phones, he offered a "Mobile Phone Euthanasia" services on the streets of Dublin, where he would destroy phones for owners. Ingoldsby retired from selling his books on the streets of Dublin in 2015.

In March 2022, the Museum of Literature Ireland (MoLI) hosted a video installation to mark the release of Ingoldsby's latest anthology, In Dublin They Really Tell You Things — Pat Ingoldsby, Selected Poems 1986–2021.

== Death ==
Ingoldsby died on 1 March 2025, at a nursing home in Clontarf, Dublin at the age of 82.

== Style ==
Ingoldsby was a prolific poet. His 1998 book Half a Hug comprises 260 poems from the previous year, and subsequent volumes comprised 500 (i'mouthere) or more works that ranged from a single line to a page. Most of Ingoldsby's poems were about his personal experiences, observations of life in Dublin, or mildly surreal humorous possibilities. Topics of personal experiences vary from the death of his father, or the electroconvulsive therapy he received (c. 1988), to his appreciation of the natural world or his pets (mostly cats, but also some fish). Observations of Dublin are mostly humorous conversations overheard on the bus, or the characters he saw and talked to while selling his books on the streets. Some observations were not so cheerful as he also saw the drunks and the homeless of Dublin City, and the some aspects of modernisation which he wasn't pleased with. In his obituary in the Irish Times, he was described as "embodying the surreal wit and the melancholy bound up in the city’s personality". "In serious times, he reminded audiences of all ages of the importance of being silly".

A recurring character, Wesley Quench, appears in roles such as the driver of a Flying See-Saw Brigade. Another poem, "Vagina in the Vatican", depicted a vagina sneaking into the Vatican unstopped because no one knew what it was – except for a few who couldn't let slip that they did. He also occasionally produced stories for children. These are a childish version of his mildly surreal style.

== Bibliography ==
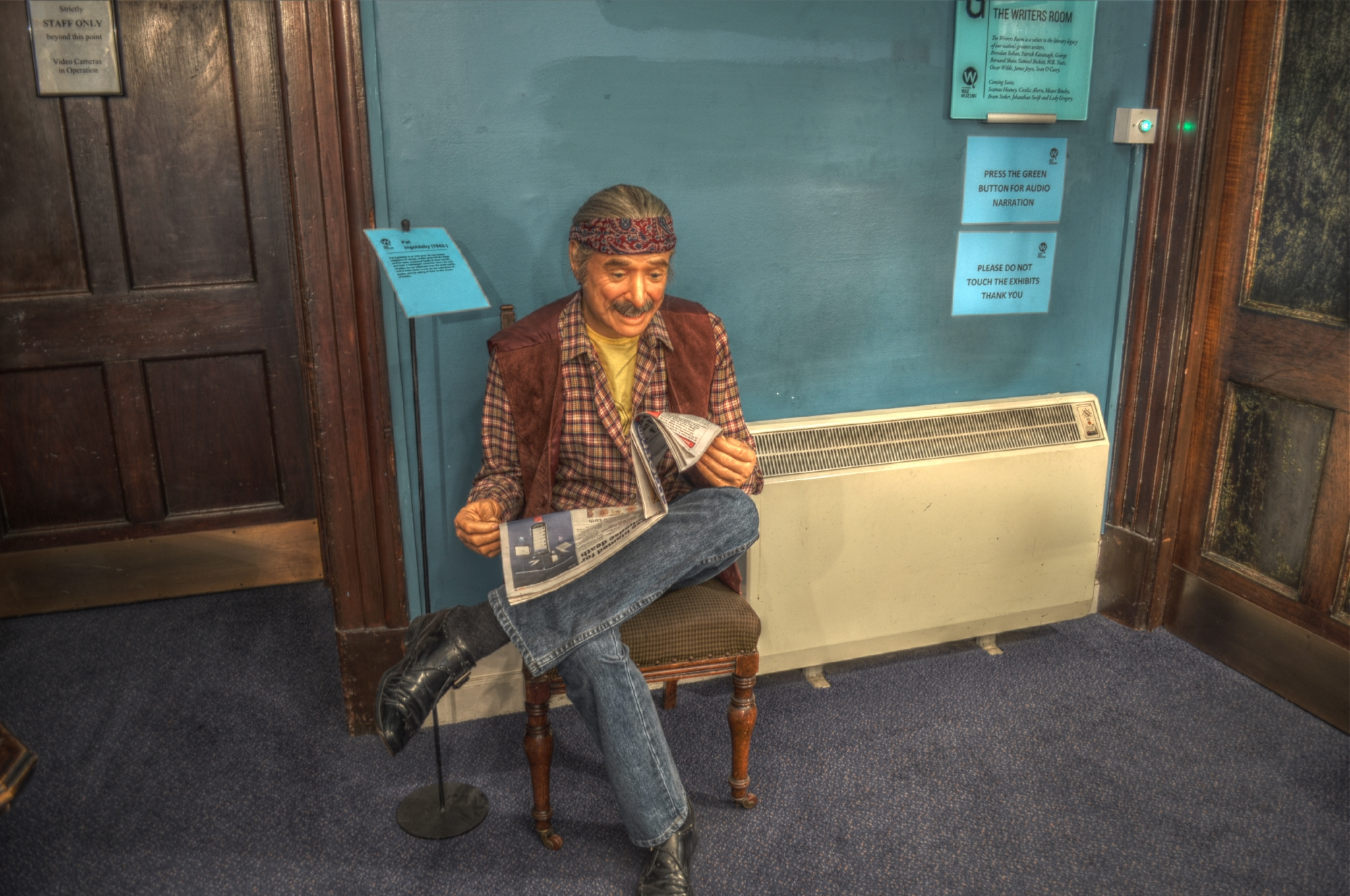
Ingoldsby's wax figure at the National Wax Museum Plus

=== Poetry ===
- You've Just Finished Reading This Title
- Rhyme Doesn't with Reason
- Up the Leg of Your Jacket
- Welcome to My Head (Please Remove Your Boots) (1986)
- Salty Water (1988)
- Scandal Sisters (1990)
- How Was It for You Doctor? (1994)
- Poems So Fresh and So New...Yahoo! (1995)
- If You Don't Tell Anybody I Won't (1996)
- See Liz She Spins (1997)
- Half a Hug (1998)
- Beautiful Cracked Eyes (1999)
- The Blue E-Tee Wet! (2000)
- Do Lámh I Mo Bhrístí (2001)
- The Frenchwoman and the Sky (2003)
- Once Upon a 'Hide (2004)
- I'm Out Here (2005)
- Can I Get in the Bath? (2007)
- Once Upon a Wicked Eye (2008)
- I Thought You Died Years Ago (2009)
- Hitting Cows with a Banjo (2011)
- Pawmarks on My Poems (2013)
- Mise Mac Giolla (2017) (in Irish)
- In Dublin They Really Tell You Things (selected poems, 2022, edited by Vivienne Baillie, published by Museum of Literature Ireland, MoLI)
- Out Of The Blue ... Pink, edited by Vivienne Baillie - 2025

=== Other works ===
==== For adults ====
- Hisself (Play, Peacock Theatre, Dublin)
- When Am I Gettin' Me Clothes (Play, Peacock Theatre, Dublin) (later adapted for radio play on RTÉ Radio 1)
- The Dark Days of Denny Lacey (radio play, RTÉ Radio 1)
- She Came Up from the Sea (radio play, RTÉ Radio 1)
- Fire Is Far Enough (radio play, RTÉ Radio 1)
- Liffey Ever Is (radio play, RTÉ Radio 1)
- The Peculiar Sensation of Being Irish (short stories) (1995) ISBN 1-873548-31-1
- Laugh Without Prejudice (short stories) (1996) ISBN 1-873548-37-0
- My Own Voice (audio CD of Ingoldsby reading some of his poems)
- Let Me into Your Ear (audio CD of Ingoldsby reading more of his poems)
- One Good Sparkle (spoken-word tribute album produced by Luain Press, 2026)

==== For children ====
- Zany Tales (short stories book)
- Rhymin' Simon (Play)
- Yeukface the Yeuk and the Spotty Grousler (play)
- Tell Me a Story Pat (audio tape)

Ingoldsby also wrote some episodes of Wanderly Wagon.

== Filmography ==
- The Peculiar Sensation of Being Pat Ingoldsby, a 2022 documentary by Seamus Murphy on the life and works of Ingoldsby (produced by Broadstone Films, Dublin)
