= Richard Ingoldsby =

English politician (1617–1685)

Colonel Sir Richard Ingoldsby (10 August 1617 – 9 September 1685) was an English officer in the New Model Army during the English Civil War and a politician who sat in the House of Commons variously between 1647 and 1685. As a Commissioner (Judge) at the trial of King Charles I, he signed the king's death warrant but was one of the few regicides to be pardoned.

== Early life ==
Richard Ingoldsby was the second son of Sir Richard Ingoldsby K.B. of Lethenborough in Buckinghamshire and Elizabeth, the daughter of Sir Oliver Cromwell of Hinchingbrooke, Huntingdon (the uncle and godfather of Oliver Cromwell the Lord Protector). This meant that Ingoldsby was a cousin of the Lord Protector. He was educated at Lord Williams's School in Thame, Oxfordshire. He had four sisters and seven brothers, including the oldest, Francis Ingoldsby, and Sir Henry Ingoldsby, 1st Baronet.

== Military career ==
During the English Civil War, he joined John Hampden's regiment as a captain and followed Oliver Cromwell into the New Model Army where he served as Colonel. He was detached by Sir Thomas Fairfax in May 1645 to relieve Taunton. He took part in the western campaign and was involved in the capture of Bristol and Bridgewater. His regiment garrisoned Oxford when it surrendered in 1646. In the quarrel between the parliament and the army in 1647 Ingoldsby's regiment took the army's part with the army. The regiment was ordered to be disbanded on 14 June, and money was sent to pay it off. The money was recalled by subsequent vote, but it had already reached Oxford, and the soldiers forcibly took it and routed the escorting troops. Ingoldsby's regiment also petitioned against the Treaty of Newport and in favour of punishing the King. On 4 October 1647 Ingoldsby was elected Member of Parliament (M.P.) for Wendover in the Long Parliament. Ingoldsby himself was appointed one of the King's judges, which ended in his signing the death warrant, although there is no evidence that he was present at any of the previous court sessions. In 1649, his regiment was one of the regiments which supported the Bishopsgate mutiny and for a time he was held prisoner by his own men. Some Levellers, notably Col. William Eyres, were imprisoned in Oxford after the Banbury mutiny, and contrived to inspire a second mutiny in the garrison, although it was quickly suppressed by Ingoldsby and others, and two of the ring-leaders were shot in Broken Hayes. In May 1651, Ingoldsby's regiment left Oxford and joined the army which fought at the Battle of Worcester the last battle of the English Civil War.

== Parliamentary career ==
Ingoldsby was chosen as one of the Council of State in November 1652. He was elected MP for Buckinghamshire in 1654 for the First Protectorate Parliament and 1656 for the Second Protectorate Parliament. He sat in the second house of Parliament commonly known as Cromwell's Other House in 1657–1659. When Oliver Cromwell died in 1659, Ingoldsby supported Richard Cromwell as Lord Protector when the officers of the army began to agitate against Richard Cromwell. Ingoldsby vigorously supported the new Protector, who was his own kinsman, but after the Rump Parliament removed Richard he threw in his lot with General George Monck and the move towards the restoration of the English monarchy. Seeing the Restoration at hand, he entered into negotiation with the agents of Charles II. As he was a regicide, the King refused to promise him indemnity, and left him to earn a pardon by his good services. In the struggle between Parliament and the army he energetically backed Parliament, and on 28 December 1659, he received its thanks for seizing Windsor Castle. Monck appointed him to command Colonel Rich's regiment (February 1660), and sent him to suppress John Lambert's intended rising (18 April 1660). Lambert had escaped from the Tower where General George Monck had imprisoned him, and had tried to raise the supporters of the Good Old Cause in a last-ditch attempt to stop the English Restoration in 1660. On 22 April Ingoldsby met Lambert's forces near Daventry, arrested him as he tried to flee, and brought him in triumph to London. Ingoldsby was thanked by the House of Commons on 26 April 1660. He was elected Member of Parliament for the constituency of Aylesbury in early 1660 in the Convention Parliament.

After the Restoration, Ingoldsby was pardoned for his regicide, firstly for his activities in support of General Monck, and secondly because he pleaded that he had been forced to sign the death warrant by his cousin Oliver Cromwell, in that "he refused but Cromwell and the others held him by violence; and Cromwell, with a loud laugh, taking his hand in his, and putting the pen between his fingers, with his own hand wrote Richard Ingoldsby". He was not only spared the punishment which befell the rest of the regicides, but was created a Knight of the Bath at the coronation of Charles II on 20 April 1661. He was re-elected MP for Aylesbury in the Cavalier Parliament and held the seat until 1685.

Ingoldsby died in 1685 and was buried in Hartwell Church, Buckinghamshire, on 16 September 1685. He had married Elizabeth Lee, second daughter of Sir George Croke of Waterstock, Oxfordshire, and widow of Thomas Lee of Hartwell. Richard Ingoldsby, commander of the Army in Ireland, was his nephew.

== Notes ==
Parliament of England
Preceded by Robert Croke; Thomas Fountaine	Member of Parliament for Wendover; 1647–1653; With: Thomas Fountaine; Thomas Harrison	Succeeded by Not represented in the Barebones Parliament
Preceded by George Fleetwood; George Baldwin	Member of Parliament for Buckinghamshire; 1654–1656; With: Bulstrode Whitelocke 1654–1656; Sir Richard Pigot 1654–1656; Richard Greenville 1654–1656; George Fleetwood 1654; Richard Hampden 1656	Succeeded by Richard Greenville; William Bowyer
Preceded by Not represented in the restored Rump	Member for Aylesbury; 1660–1685; With: Sir Thomas Lee, 1st Bt.	Succeeded by Sir William Egerton; Richard Anderson
