= Maeve Ingoldsby =

Irish writer (1947–2021)

- Born: Maeve Ingoldsby; 1947; Dublin, Ireland
- Died: 29 September 2021; Portmarnock, Dublin, Ireland
- Occupations: Playwright, author
- Relatives: Pat Ingoldsby (cousin)
- Writing career
- Language: English, Irish
- Period: 1978 onwards
- Genres: Comedy, drama

Maeve Ingoldsby McDonagh (1947 – 29 September 2021) also known as Maeve Nic Giolla Iosa, was an Irish writer of the Raidió Teilifís Éireann (RTÉ) radio comedy show Only Slaggin' and writer on RTÉ television soap operas Glenroe and Fair City. She was a well-known playwright and satirist.

== Early life ==
Ingoldsby was born in Dublin, one of the eight children of Colm Ingoldsby and Maureen Ingoldsby. She was a school teacher as a young woman.

== Career ==
Ingoldsby wrote for the radio comedy programme Only Slaggin', and wrote episodes for television soap operas Glenroe and Fair City. She wrote numerous children's plays including Earwigs, which was awarded "Best Young Peoples' Production" at the Dublin Theatre Festival in 1995. Two of her plays were the bases for children's operas of Colin Mawby, commissioned and first performed by the National Chamber Choir of Ireland. She was writer-i-residence and script editor with the Barnstorm Theatre Company in Kilkenny. She wrote seven pantos for the Gaiety Theatre, and six more for the Performing Arts School Galway.

In 1997 Ingoldsby held an international arts residency in the United States, and was the first Author in Residence at the Bienes Center for the Literary Arts in Florida.

== Personal life ==
Ingoldsby married Bernard McDonagh and had five sons and a daughter. She died on 29 September 2021, age 74, at her home in Portmarnock. In 2024, her play The Bus, written with Philip Hardy, was produced by Barnstorm Theatre Company and toured in Ireland. Her son Brian McDonagh was Mayor of Fingal in 2024. Her sons Seán, Niall, and Gus are all professional actors.

== Works ==
- Firestone (1990)
- Earwigs (1995)
- Bananas in the Bread Bin (1997)
- Silly Bits of Sky (1998)
- Scaredycats (1999)
- Kevin's Story (2001)
- Monkey Puzzle Tree
- Out of Line
- Crabs in a Bucket
- The Bus (2002, with Philip Hardy)
- A Proper Da
