= Sir Henry Ingoldsby, 1st Baronet =

English military commander and landowner

Sir Henry Ingoldsby, 1st Baronet (1622–1701) was an English military commander and landowner.

He was born in Lethenborough, Buckinghamshire, the 5th son of Sir Richard Ingoldsby and his wife Elizabeth Cromwell. She was the daughter of Sir Oliver Cromwell (died 1655), who was the uncle and godfather of Oliver Cromwell. He had four sisters and seven brothers, including Francis Ingoldsby and the regicide Richard Ingoldsby.

He became an officer in the army under King Charles I of England but changed his loyalty to become a colonel in the Parliamentarian army under Oliver Cromwell. He volunteered to join Cromwell in his 1649 Irish campaign and fought under him at Drogheda and under Henry Ireton at Limerick. He was subsequently appointed Governor of Limerick and was rewarded by large grants of land in County Clare and County Meath. He was MP for counties County Clare, Limerick and County Kerry in the Protectorate Parliaments of 1654, 1656 and 1659.

Foreseeing the imminent Restoration of Charles II he raced to England as soon as he heard of Richard Cromwell's downfall and seized Windsor Castle, holding it for the now pro-monarchist Parliament against the republican forces. After the Restoration of Charles II he was rewarded by being allowed to keep his Irish lands and have his Cromwellian baronetcy confirmed as Baronet of Beggstown, County Meath. He was appointed to the Privy Council of Ireland, and continued to represent County Clare in the Irish House of Commons in 1661–1666 and 1695–1699. He formed a regiment in 1689 to fight in Ireland for William III under General Schomberg, serving at the Siege of Carrickfergus.

He died in Ireland in March 1701. He had married Anne, daughter of Sir Hardress Waller and Elizabeth Dowdall. He was succeeded as baronet by his son George, who married Mary, the daughter of Sir Peter Stanley, 2nd Bt and his wife Elizabeth Leigh, daughter of Sir John Leigh. He had a younger son Henry, MP for Limerick. He also had a daughter Anne, who married Sir Francis Blundell, 3rd Baronet.

Baronetage of England
| New creation | Baronet (of Lethenborough); 1661–1701 | Succeeded by George Ingoldsby |
