= Francis Ingoldsby =

English politician

Francis Ingoldsby (1615 – 1 October 1681) was an English politician who sat in the House of Commons between 1654 and 1659.

Ingoldsby was the son of Sir Richard Ingoldsby of Lenborough, Buckinghamshire and his wife Elizabeth Cromwell. He matriculated at Lincoln College, Oxford on 25 November 1631, aged 16. He sold his estate of Lenborough to his steward. In 1654 he was elected Member of Parliament for Buckingham for the First Protectorate Parliament. He was re-elected MP for Buckingham in 1656 for the Second Protectorate Parliament and again in 1659 for the Third Protectorate Parliament. On the Restoration, he was one of those nominated for the projected title of Knight of the Royal Oak.

Ingoldsby died a pensioner of the Charterhouse, London in 1681.

Ingoldsby was the brother of Richard Ingoldsby who was one of the few regicides to be pardoned.

Preceded by Not represented in the Barebones Parliament	Member of Parliament for Buckingham; 1654–1659; With: Sir Richard Temple, 3rd Baronet 1659	Succeeded by John Dormer
