= Ballybricken =

Area of County Limerick, Ireland

Ballybricken Baile Uí Bhricín
- Townlands
- Location in Ireland
- Coordinates: 52°33′45″N 8°31′43″W
- Country: Ireland
- Province: Munster
- County: County Limerick
- Time zone: UTC+0 (WET)
  - Summer (DST): UTC-1 (IST (WEST))

Ballybricken (Irish: Baile Uí Bhricín, meaning 'the town of Ó Bricín') is an area in the east of County Limerick in Ireland. It is in the civil parish of Caherelly, approximately 18 kilometres (11 miles) from Limerick city. Ballybricken is mainly a farming area.

== Amenities and sport ==
Ballybricken has a shop/post office and pub.

The local GAA club, Ballybricken/Bohermore GAA Club, has its grounds in the area. A new clubhouse was officially opened in May 2008. The club's senior teams play at a Junior A level in both hurling and football.

The local national (primary) school, Caherelly National School or Scoil Ailbhe, is situated opposite the Ballybricken Bohermore GAA grounds. While the present school building was built in 1955, an earlier school had been built nearby in the late 1830s.

The ruins of Caherelly Castle are located, away from the road, between the school and Coole Cross.

== Notable people ==
- Singer Dolores O'Riordan, from The Cranberries, was brought up in Ballybricken and went to the local primary school. She is also buried at Caherelly graveyard.
