= Caherelly =

Civil parish in County Limerick, Ireland

Coordinates: 52.55°N 8.5°W

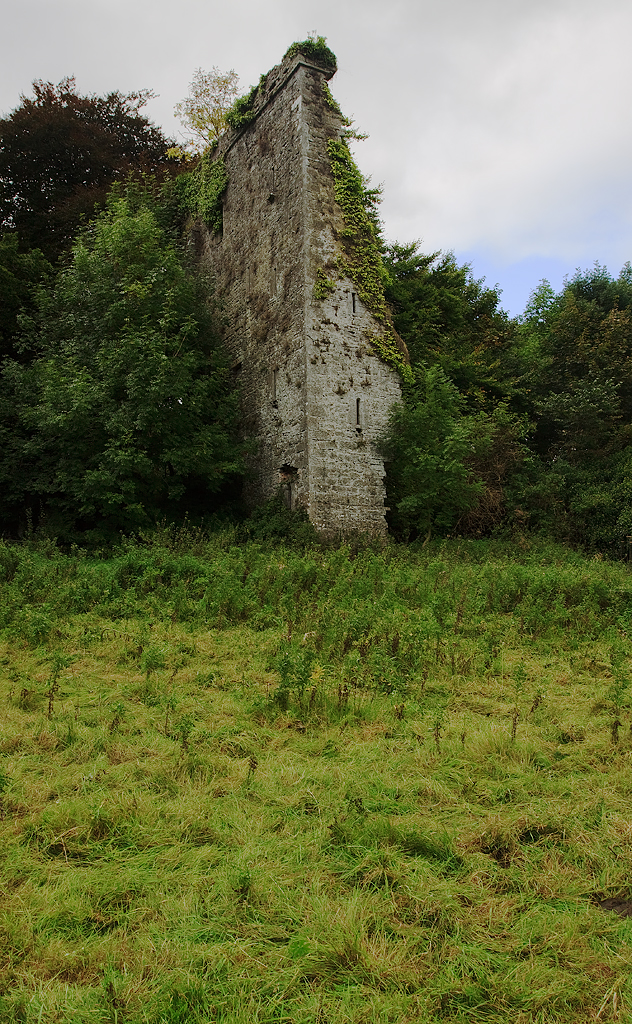
The ruins of Caherelly Castle, a medieval tower house, lie in the townland of Caherelly West

Caherelly (Irish: Cathair Ailí, meaning 'fort of the rocky place') is a civil parish in County Limerick, Ireland. Caherelly National School, also known as Scoil Ailbhe, is the local national (primary) school. The local Gaelic Athletic Association club, Ballybricken/Bohermore GAA Club, has its grounds in Caherelly East townland.

== See also ==
- Ballybricken, a townland within the civil parish
