= Lenborough =

Hamlet in Buckinghamshire, England

Coordinates: 51.977°N 0.981°W

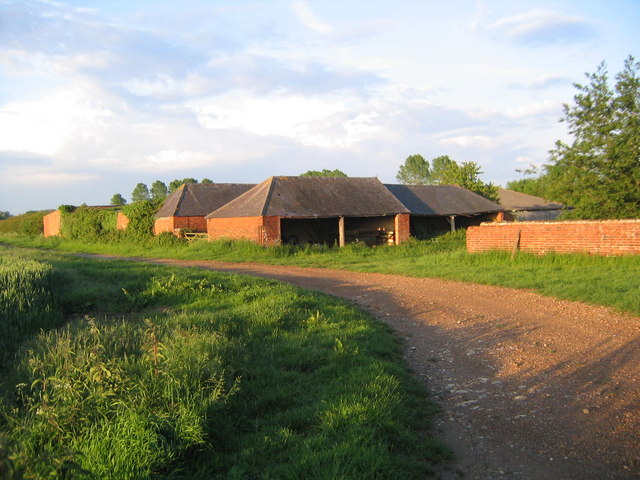
Lenborough Farm, 2007

Lenborough is a hamlet in the parish of Buckingham next to Gawcott, in Buckinghamshire, England. It is in the civil parish of Gawcott with Lenborough.

== Description ==
Lenborough consists mainly of barn conversions and farm houses and connects by footpath to the Buckingham Industrial Estate.

== Anglo Saxon coins ==
On 21 December 2014, metal detectorist Paul Coleman discovered a hoard of 5,251½ Anglo-Saxon coins in near mint condition. The hoard was discovered during the Weekend Wanderers Detecting Club's end-of-year rally, and includes coins from the reigns of Æthelred the Unready (c.968-1016) and Cnut the Great (c.985-1035).
