= Sousa, Paraíba =

Coordinates: 6.76083°S 38.2308°W

Sousa
- Municipality
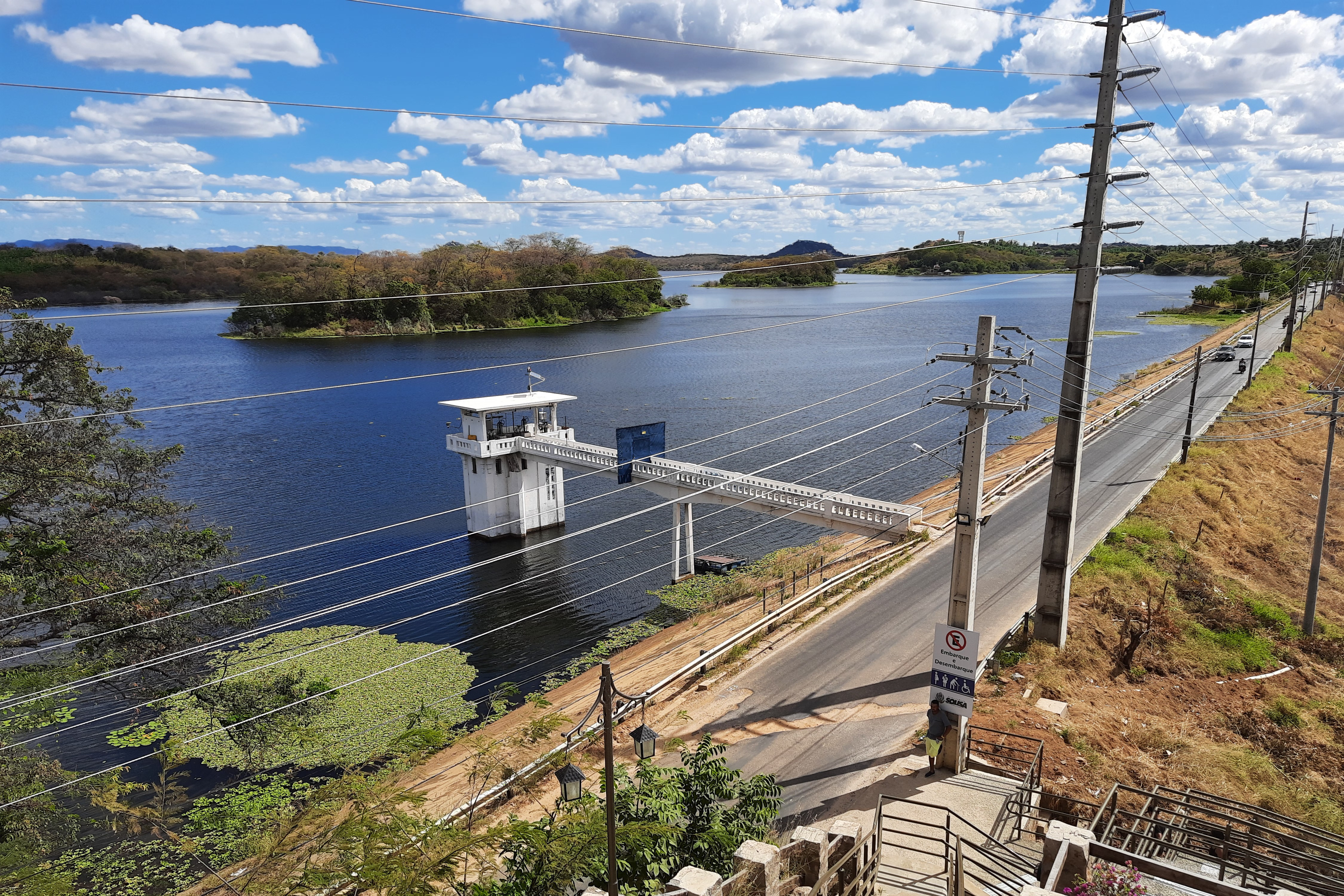

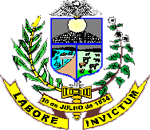
- Flag Coat of arms
- Interactive map of Sousa
- Country: Brazil
- Region: Northeast
- State: Paraíba
- Mesoregion: Sertao Paraibana

Population (2020)
  - Total: 69,723
- Time zone: UTC−3 (BRT)

Sousa is a municipality in the state of Paraíba in the Northeast Region of Brazil.

It lies in the region called the Valley of the Dinosaurs, which contains a protected area containing dinosaur tracks. The municipality established the Valley of the Dinosaurs Natural Monument, a fully protected area, in 2002.

== History ==
=== From the origins to the 19th century ===
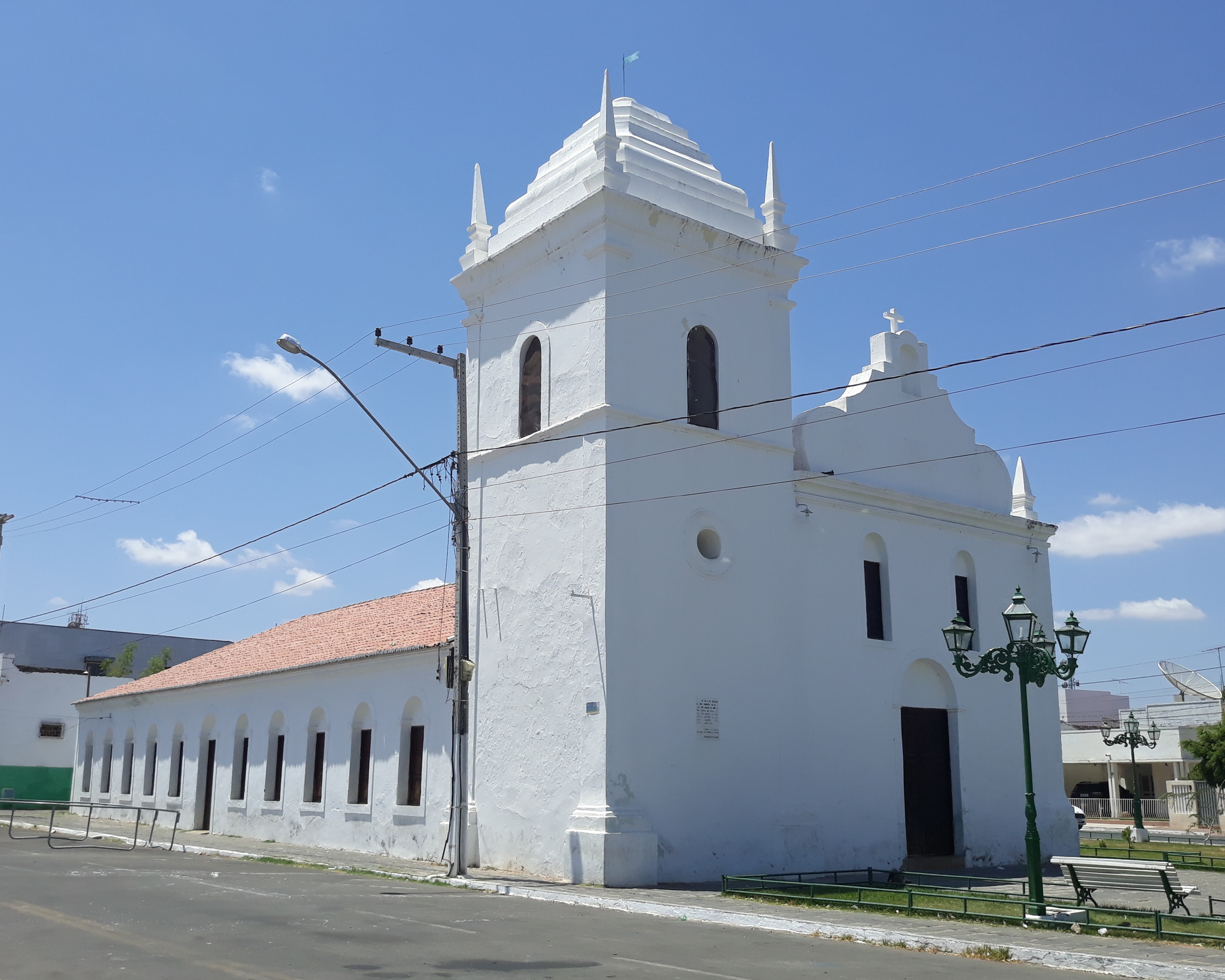
Our Lady of the Rosary of the Blacks Church, formerly known as Our Lady of Remedies Church, is the oldest Catholic church in Sousa and was listed as a historical landmark in 1999.

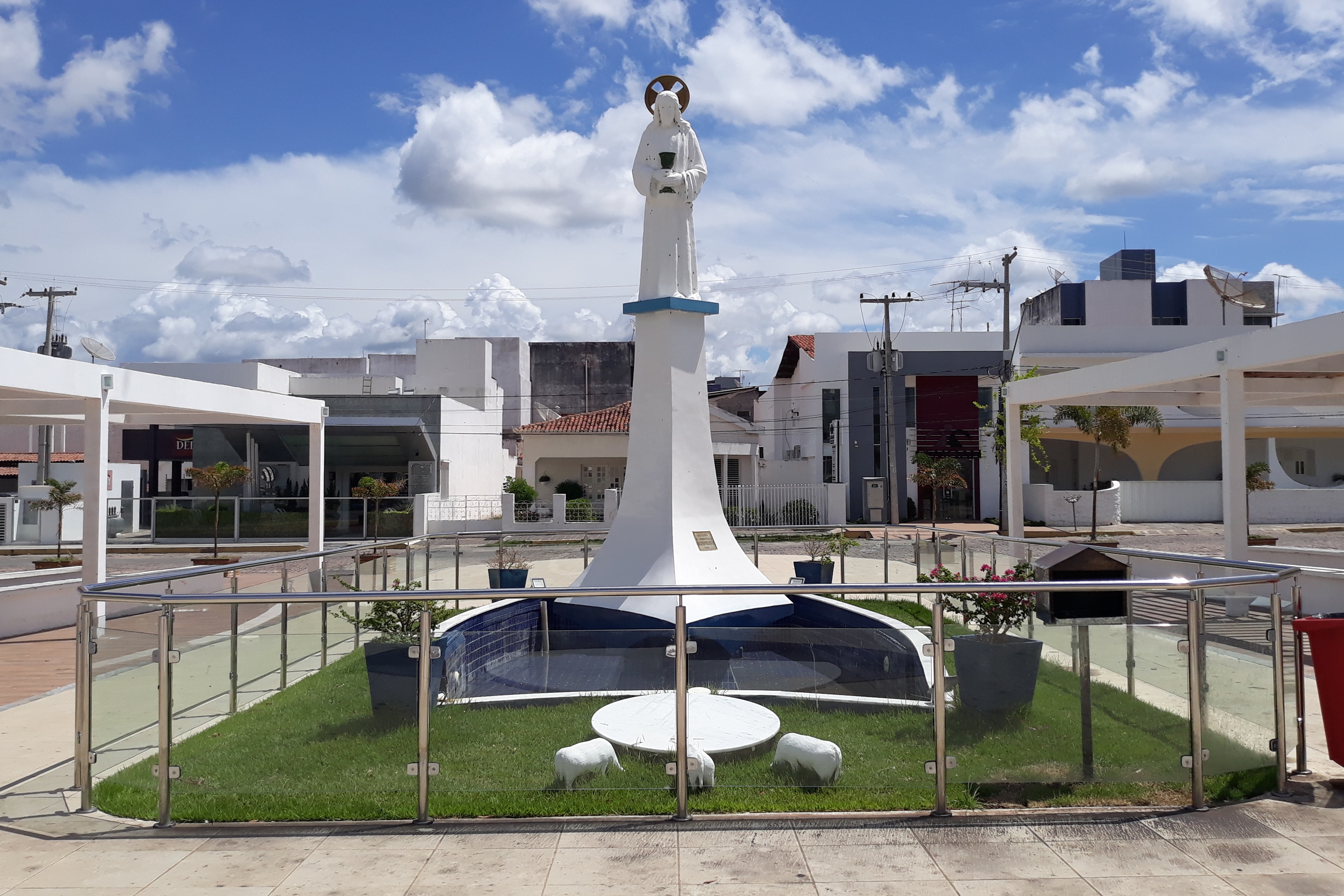
Statue erected in memory of the Eucharistic miracle of Sousa

The colonization of the region along the Peixe River, in the western part of the Captaincy of Paraíba, by settlers from Bahia, Pernambuco, and São Paulo, occurred at the end of the 17th century, around 1691. The exploration of the hinterlands during the 16th and 17th centuries was gradual, requiring great effort from the sertanistas (backlands explorers) to master lands that were less known and farther from the coast. The first land grant (sesmaria) appeared on November 29, 1708, and was given to Antônio José da Cunha by the governor of the captaincy, João da Maia da Gama. In 1723, brothers Francisco and Teodósio de Oliveira Ledo donated the land to the Casa da Torre of Bahia, owned by the d’Ávila family.

Due to the fertility of the local soil, new residents began to arrive, giving rise to the village of Jardim do Rio do Peixe, among them Bento Freire de Sousa and José Gomes de Sá, who received the sesmaria from the Casa da Torre around 1730. With this donation, Bento Freire envisioned the first chapel in the settlement, dedicated to Our Lady of Remedies, now the Church of Our Lady of the Rosary of the Blacks, built between 1730 and 1732.

On July 22, 1766, by Royal Charter, the settlement was elevated to the status of a vila (town). On March 7, 1784, the parish of Our Lady of Remedies was separated from the parish of Our Lady of Good Success of Pombal, and on June 4, 1800, almost 34 years after the creation of the vila, it was formally installed with the name Villa Nova de Sousa.

On March 25, 1814 — the Feast of the Annunciation in the Catholic Church — the Eucharistic Miracle of Sousa occurred during Mass at the Church of the Rosary of the Blacks. In the same year, construction began on the current Church of Our Lady of Remedies, which was halted from 1817 and remained unfinished for 25 years.

By provincial law 28, dated July 10, 1854, the vila was elevated to city status under the name Sousa. In 1859, the district of Cajazeiras was created, and in 1863 it became an independent municipality by provincial law. That same year, the district of São João do Rio do Peixe was created and later separated in 1881. In 1872, during the first demographic census of the Brazilian Empire, Sousa had a population of 29,726 inhabitants, making it the most populous municipality in the province of Paraíba. At the time, its territory encompassed a vast area in the western part of the province, bordering Rio Grande do Norte and Ceará. In 1897, farmer Anísio Fausto da Silva discovered the first dinosaur footprints ever found in Brazil, in what is now the locality of Passagem das Pedras.

=== From the 1900s to the 1960s ===
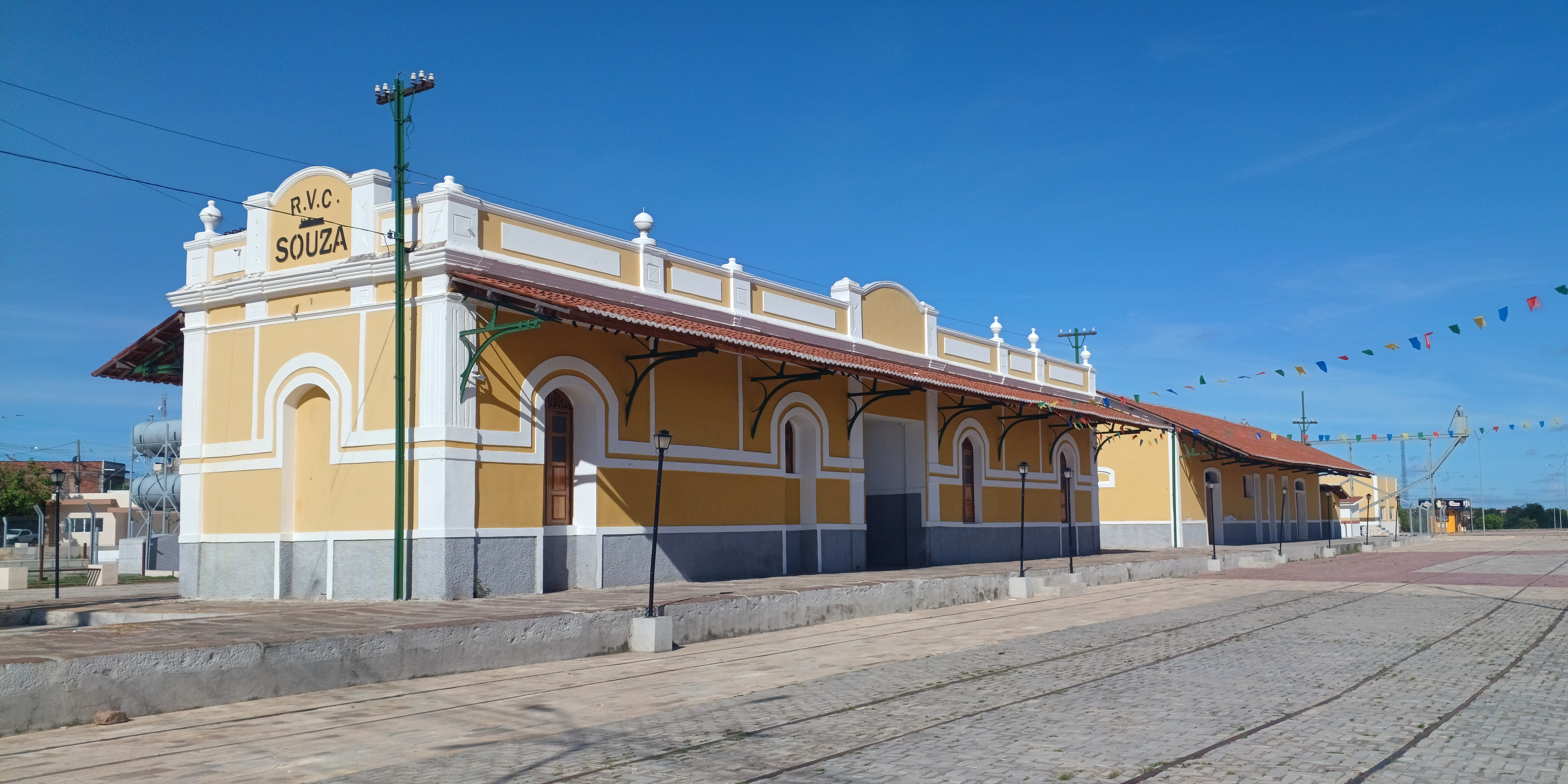
Former Sousa railway station, inaugurated on May 13, 1926

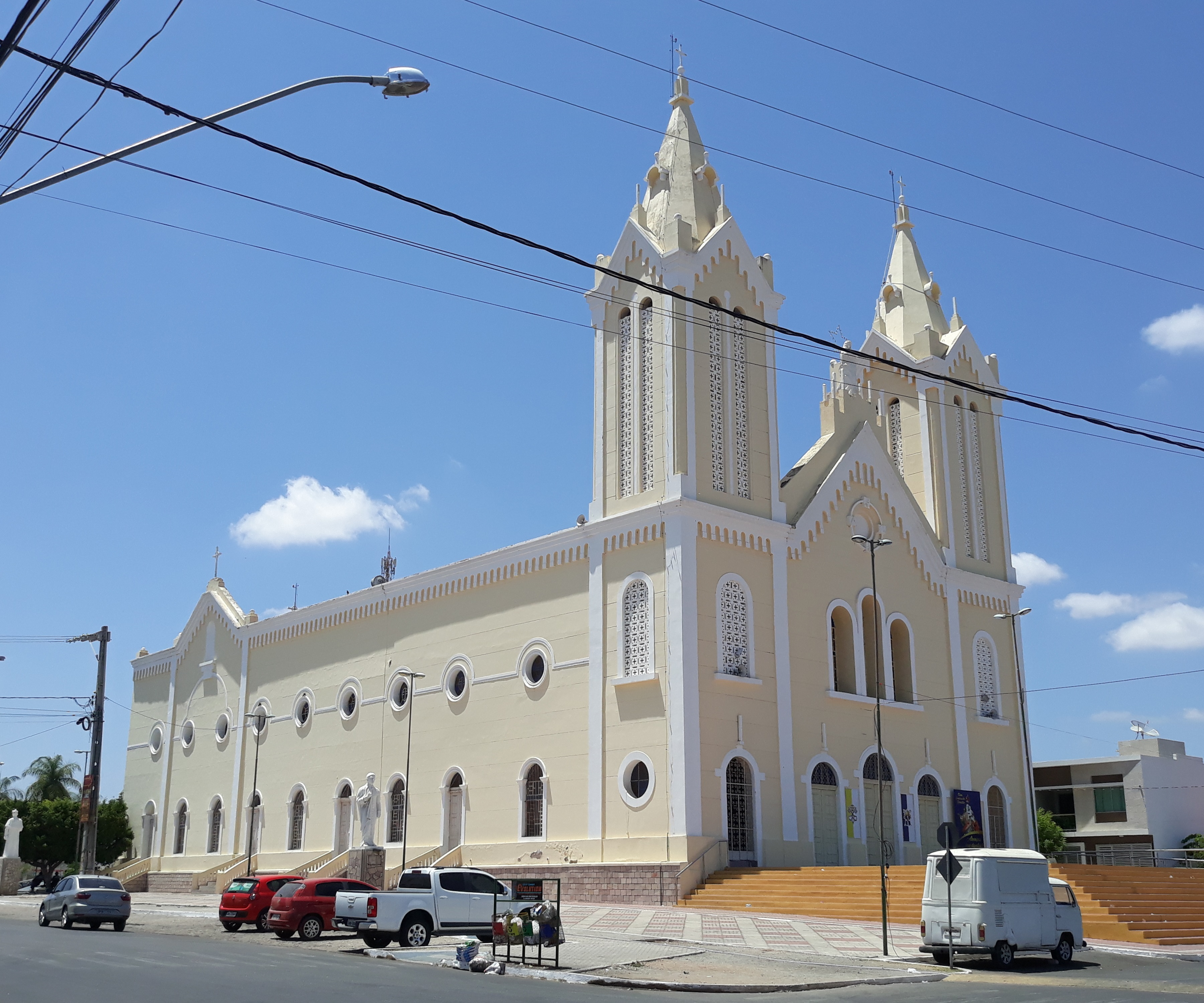
The current Parish Church of Our Lady of Remedies, built in the 19th century and only completed in 1942

The city underwent intense urbanization beginning in the 1910s. In 1915, during a major drought in the sertão, the first public market was built. In 1922, the first trains arrived in the city, although the railway station was inaugurated only on May 13, 1926, as part of the line connecting Sousa to the state of Ceará, operated by the Rede de Viação Cearense (Cearense Railway Network). Earlier, on July 27, 1924, a group of bandits led by Virgulino Ferreira da Silva (Lampião) invaded and looted the city.

The year 1925 marked the arrival of electricity, and in 1928 the building for the João Suassuna School Group (now Cônego José Viana School) was erected. The following year, the first municipal public slaughterhouse was built. In 1933 and 1936, the Catete Hotel and the São Gonçalo Dam were inaugurated, respectively, both attended by Brazilian president Getúlio Vargas. In 1938, the São José School began operating in the building that once housed the Charity House. In 1942, the construction of the Church of Our Lady of Remedies was finally completed.

On October 12, 1947, Sousa held its first direct mayoral election, electing Emídio Sarmento de Sá. Two years later, the Cine Glória e Pax theater was built, though it was demolished in 1995. In 1952, a railway line connecting Sousa to Mossoró (Rio Grande do Norte) was inaugurated. In 1955, the Rural Home Economics School of Sousa was founded; in 1979, it became the Federal Agrotechnical School of Sousa, and in 2008 it was incorporated into the Federal Institute of Paraíba (IFPB).

Between 1955 and 1957, the current Capitão Antônio Vieira Square was built behind the main church, and in 1957 the Engineer Carlos Pires de Sá Bridge was constructed over the Peixe River, enabling the city to expand to the river’s left bank. In 1958, the Congregation of the Daughters of Saint Teresa of Jesus arrived and inaugurated the current Our Lady Help of Christians School, on the same site where the São José School had operated until 1957.

Also in 1958, on January 10, the Parish of the Most Holy Eucharistic Jesus was established, whose original church, dating back to 1855, was demolished in 1962 to extend Coronel José Gomes de Sá Street. Between 1959 and 1963, the districts of São José da Lagoa Tapada (1959), Nazarezinho (1961), Santa Cruz (1961), and Lastro (1963) were separated from Sousa and elevated to municipal status.

In 1961, under Mayor Francisco Gonçalves da Silva, the Eucharistic Miracle Square was built. In the municipal elections of August 11, 1963, Antônio Mariz was elected mayor by a margin of just seven votes. His administration renovated Almeida Barreto Square — renamed Bento Freire Square — and built the current city hall, inaugurated in 1968. On April 11, 1966, the Parish of Saint Anne was created, separated from the parishes of Our Lady of Remedies and the Holy Eucharistic Jesus. On August 15, 1967, the cornerstone for the current Eucharistic Sanctuary of the Holy Jesus was laid. In the 1968 municipal elections, Clarence Pires de Sá was elected mayor, serving from 1969 to 1973.

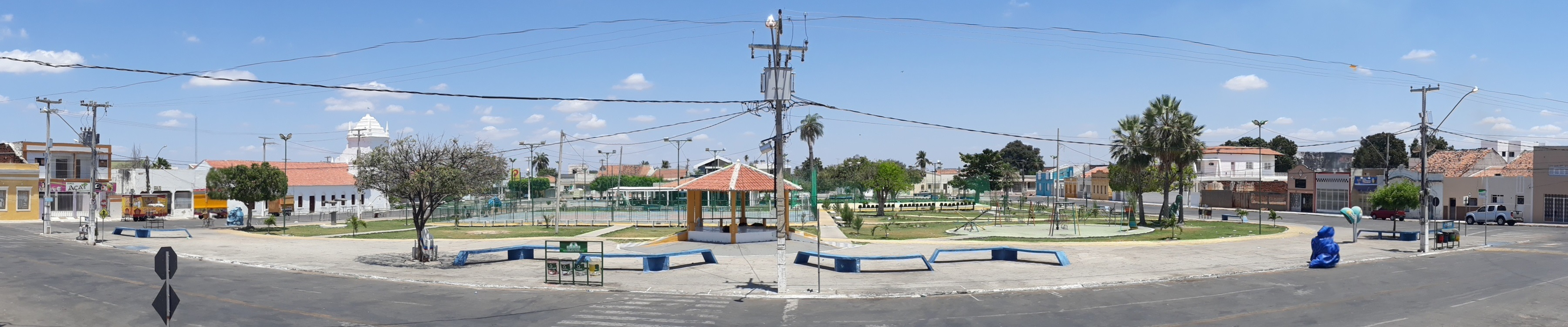
Bento Freire Square, initially Almeida Barreto Square, was built in the first decades of the 20th century, during the administration of Mayor João Alvino Gomes de Sá. In the 1960s, it was renovated during the administration of Mayor Antônio Mariz, who changed its name to its current one.

=== 1970s-present ===
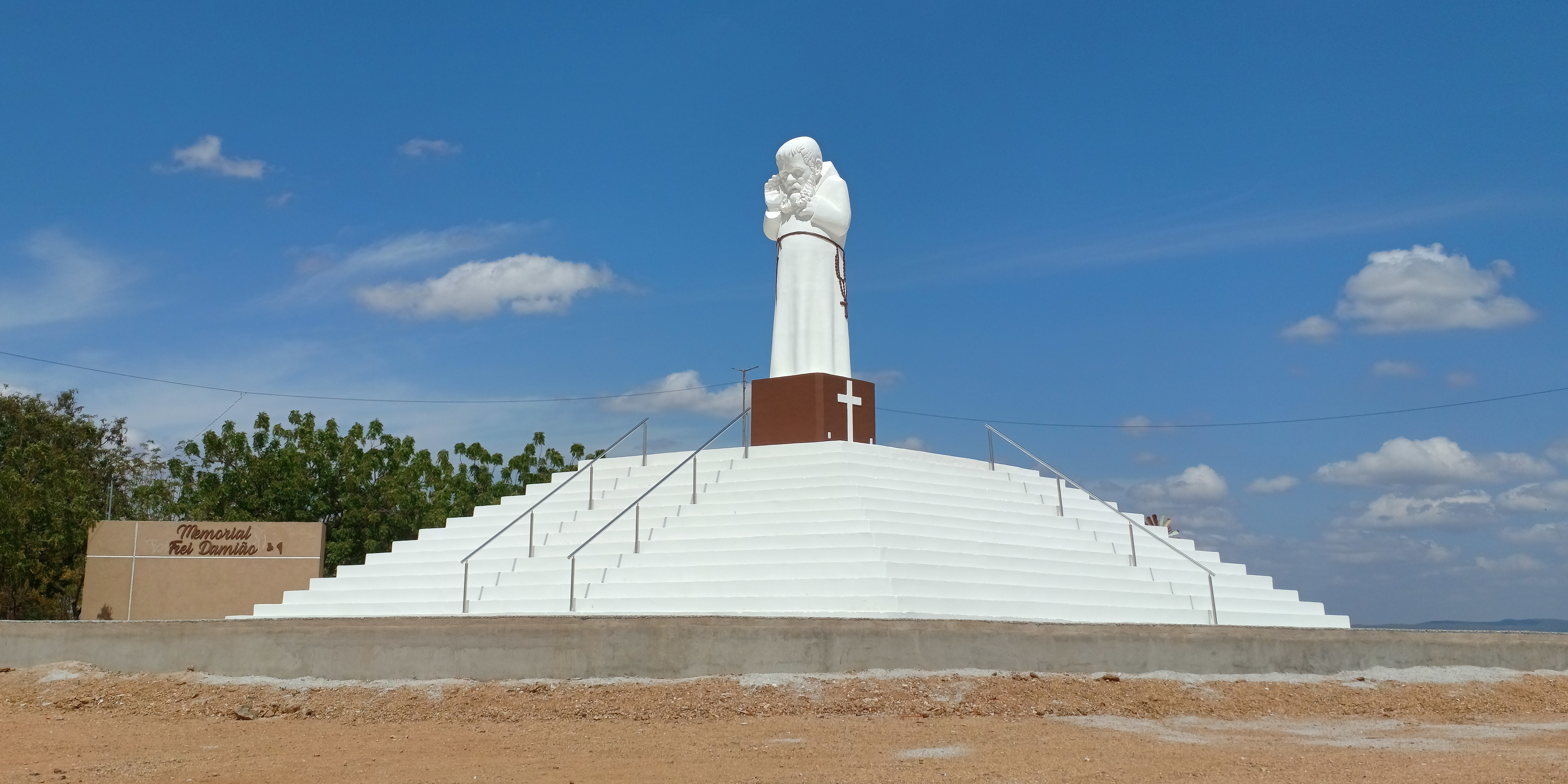
Statue of Frei Damião, in the rural area of Sousa, inaugurated in 1976

In 1971, by municipal law, the Faculty of Law of Sousa was founded. It became part of the Federal University of Paraíba (UFPB) in 1979 and later of the Federal University of Campina Grande (UFCG) in 2002. That same year, the Cine Gadelha theater opened, and in 1972 the São Gonçalo Irrigation Project was established. In that year’s elections, Gilberto Sarmento won against five opponents, and Clarence Pires was re-elected in 1976. In 1976, the Statue of Frei Damião was inaugurated, and the city adopted its current flag. Clarence’s term began on January 31, 1977, lasting six years. In 1980, Sousa reached 72,887 inhabitants, and for the first time, the urban population surpassed the rural one.

Clarence was succeeded by Nicodemos de Paiva Gadelha (1983–1988), João Estrela (1989–1992), and Mauro Abrantes Sobrinho (1993–1996). On July 10, 1991, the Sousa Esporte Clube was founded; it soon won the second division of the Paraíba Championship that same year and became state champion in the first division in 1994. On April 29, 1994, the districts of Aparecida, São Francisco, and Vieirópolis were emancipated and became municipalities. As a result, Sousa’s population fell from 79,135 in 1991 to 62,635 in 2000.

In 1997, João Estrela assumed the mayor’s office for the second time and, in 2000, became the first re-elected mayor in Sousa’s history. He governed until 2002, when he was removed from office by the Electoral Court. His runner-up, Salomão Benevides Gadelha, took office. In 2003, the Institute of Historical and Artistic Heritage of the State of Paraíba (IPHAEP) established the Historic Center of Sousa, ratified by state decree 25,030 of May 13, 2004, which listed as protected heritage sites the Church of Our Lady of Remedies, the Antônio Mariz Foundation, the Eucharistic Jesus Square, and the Our Lady Help of Christians School.

Salomão was re-elected in 2004 and succeeded by Fábio Tyrone (2009–2012). In 2013, former state deputy André Gadelha took office as mayor but failed to be re-elected in 2016, when Fábio Tyrone returned to power, re-elected in 2020 with just over 70% of valid votes. In the 2024 elections, Helder Carvalho was elected and took office on January 1, 2025.

== Climate ==
Climate data for Sousa (São Gonçalo), Paraíba (1981–2010)
Month	Jan	Feb	Mar	Apr	May	Jun	Jul	Aug	Sep	Oct	Nov	Dec	Year
Mean daily maximum °C (°F)	33.6 (92.5)	32.6 (90.7)	32.1 (89.8)	31.6 (88.9)	31.2 (88.2)	31.3 (88.3)	31.9 (89.4)	33.2 (91.8)	34.7 (94.5)	35.4 (95.7)	35.4 (95.7)	34.7 (94.5)	33.1 (91.6)
Daily mean °C (°F)	27.0 (80.6)	26.4 (79.5)	26.1 (79.0)	25.9 (78.6)	25.6 (78.1)	25.1 (77.2)	25.5 (77.9)	26.5 (79.7)	27.6 (81.7)	27.9 (82.2)	28.2 (82.8)	27.8 (82.0)	26.6 (79.9)
Mean daily minimum °C (°F)	22.3 (72.1)	21.9 (71.4)	22.0 (71.6)	21.8 (71.2)	21.0 (69.8)	19.5 (67.1)	19.2 (66.6)	19.9 (67.8)	20.9 (69.6)	21.5 (70.7)	22.1 (71.8)	22.1 (71.8)	21.2 (70.2)
Average precipitation mm (inches)	163.2 (6.43)	163.5 (6.44)	252.9 (9.96)	181.4 (7.14)	124.4 (4.90)	37.8 (1.49)	21.0 (0.83)	10.7 (0.42)	2.0 (0.08)	9.9 (0.39)	12.2 (0.48)	71.2 (2.80)	1,050.2 (41.35)
Average precipitation days (≥ 1.0 mm)	10	10	14	12	9	4	3	2	0	1	1	5	71
Average relative humidity (%)	69.0	73.7	76.1	76.6	73.3	64.6	56.1	51.0	49.6	54.4	56.8	62.9	63.7
Mean monthly sunshine hours	261.7	235.2	253.3	248.8	253.6	251.8	262.8	291.6	294.9	315.6	303.6	283.7	3,256.6
Source: Instituto Nacional de Meteorologia

== Sports ==
Sousa Esporte Clube is the municipality's football club.

== See also ==
- List of municipalities in Paraíba
