= List of rivers of Paraíba =

List of rivers in Paraíba (Brazilian State).

The list is arranged by drainage basin from north to south, with respective tributaries indented under each larger stream's name and ordered from downstream to upstream. All rivers in Paraíba drain to the Atlantic Ocean.

== By Drainage Basin ==
- Piranhas River
  - Seridó River
    - Sabugi River
    - Riacho Barra Nova (Rio Grande do Norte)
      - Dos Oitis River
    - Acauã River (Rio Grande do Norte)
      - Currais Novos River (Rio Grande do Norte)
        - Picuí River
  - Espinharas River
    - Da Farinha River
  - Piancó River
    - Jenipapo River
    - Gravatá River
  - Peixe River
    - São Francisco River
- Jacu River
- Cunaú River (Rio Grande do Norte)
  - Curimataú River
    - Pirari River
    - Calabouço River
      - Salgadinho River
    - Sombrio River
    - Guandu River
    - Salto River
- Guaju River
- Estiva River
- Mamanguape River
- Miriri River
- Paraíba River
  - Soé River
    - Tapira River
    - Jacuípe River
  - Ribeira River
  - Preto River
  - Sanhauá River
    - Paroeira River
    - Maré River
  - Obim River
  - Tibiri River
  - Salvador River
    - Una River
  - Gurinhém River
    - Gurinhenzinho River
  - Paraibinha River
  - Ingá River
  - Taperoá River
    - Floriano River
    - São José dos Cordeiros River
    - Tapera River
    - Carnaúba River
  - Sucuru River
    - Do Meio River
      - Do Umbuzeiro River
- Gramame River
  - Jacoca River
  - Mumbaba River
- Guaji River
- Garou River
- Mocatu River
- Abiaí River
  - Papocas River
    - Sal Amargo River
  - Aterro River
- Goiana River

== Alphabetically ==
- Abiaí River
- Aterro River
- Calabouço River
- Carnaúba River
- Curimataú River
- Espinharas River
- Estiva River
- Da Farinha River
- Floriano River
- Do Galé River
- Garou River
- Goiana River
- Gramame River
- Gravatá River
- Guandu River
- Guaji River
- Guaju River
- Gurinhém River
- Gurinhenzinho River
- Ingá River
- Jacoca River
- Jacu River
- Jacuípe River
- Jenipapo River
- Mamanguape River
- Maré River
- Do Meio River
- Miriri River
- Mocatu River
- Mumbaba River
- Obim River
- Dos Oitis River
- Papocas River
- Paraíba River
- Paraibinha River
- Paroeira River
- Peixe River
- Piancó River
- Picuí River
- Piranhas River
- Pirari River
- Preto River
- Ribeira River
- Sabugi River
- Sal Amargo River
- Salgadinho River
- Salto River
- Salvador River
- Sanhauá River
- São Francisco River
- São José dos Cordeiros River
- Seridó River
- Soé River
- Sombrio River
- Sucuru River
- Tapera River
- Taperoá River
- Tapira River
- Tibiri River
- Do Umbuzeiro River
- Una River
