= French invasions of Brazil =

French occupation of Brazil

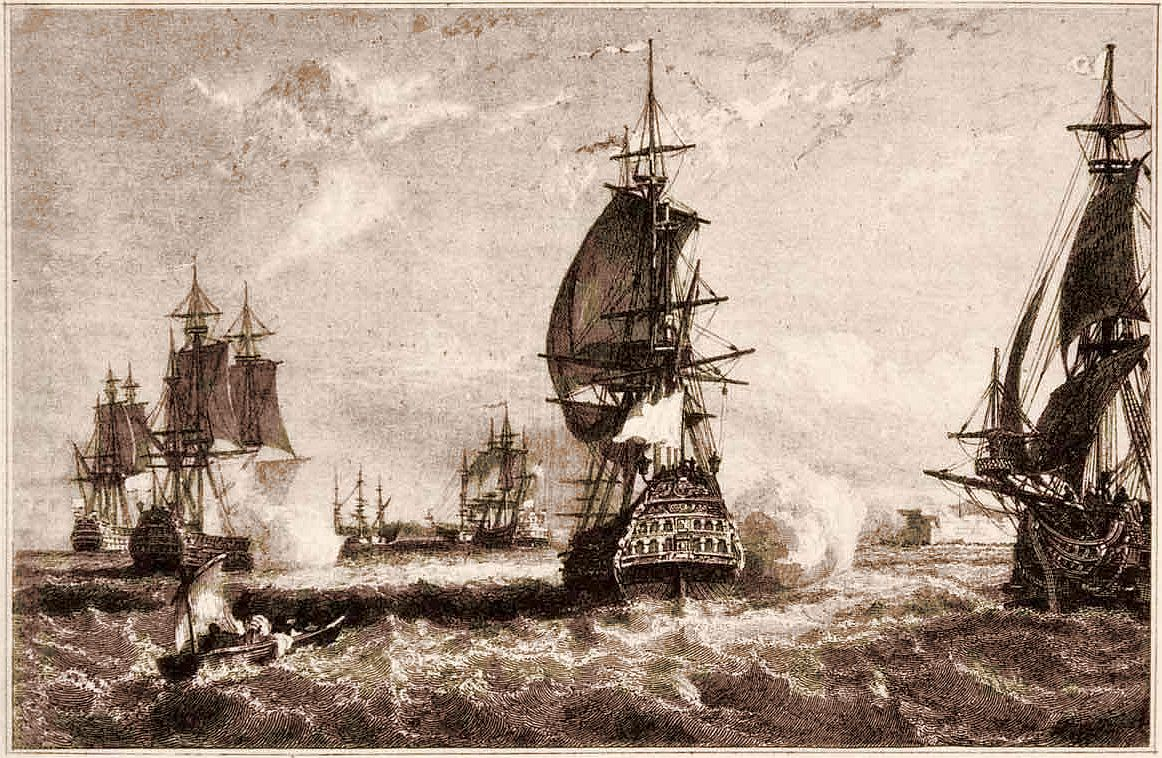
René Duguay-Trouin's privateer squadron in Guanabara Bay, September 1711, during the Battle of Rio de Janeiro.

French invasions in Brazil date back to the earliest days of Portuguese colonization up until the end of the 19th century.

The attacks, initially as part of Francis I of France's challenge to the Treaty of Tordesillas, encouraged the practice of looting for the barter of brazilwood and supported the attempts to colonize the coast of Rio de Janeiro in 1555 and the coast of Maranhão in 1594. Until the middle of the end of the 16th century, the position of the French on the northern coast (which guaranteed them the opportunity to conquer the largest known hydrographic basin) and in the far east of the continent was very stable. Allied with the natives, they were about to attack Olinda, the Portuguese's main export town. The weakening of the French began when Portugal entered the Iberian Union and decisively defeated the Bretons and Normans in the vicinity of the Potiguara area.

== History ==
=== Relations with the natives ===
Before the Portuguese colonized part of the Brazilian territory, the French had already established themselves on the coast in order to trade brazilwood. One of the strategies used to make contacts was "cunhadismo", which was based on joining up with indigenous women to form solid family and friendship ties. Capistrano de Abreu reported in his chronicles that, for a long time, it was uncertain whether Brazil was Portuguese or French, given the power of their presence and the French influence on the natives.

In the book O Povo Brasileiro, the writer Darcy Ribeiro points out:

The main nucleus [of mestizo caboclos] was the one that settled in Guanabara Bay, along with the Tamoio people of Rio de Janeiro, creating more than a thousand Mamluks who lived along the rivers that flowed into the bay. Even on Governador Island, where the France Antarctique should be set up. Other mamluks created by the French were with the Potiguara people, in Paraíba, and with the Caeté people, in Pernambuco. They achieved a level of prosperity thanks to the products they induced the natives to produce and load onto numerous ships. Their merchandise was mainly brazilwood, but they also bargained for pimenta-da-terra, cotton, as well as rarities such as common marmosets and parrots.

Once the country's coast was definitively conquered at the beginning of the 17th century, the French began to frequent the Brazilian coast less. However, those already established continued to live alongside the indigenous people and their mixed-race children.

=== Colonial Brazil ===
==== From Paraíba to Ceará ====
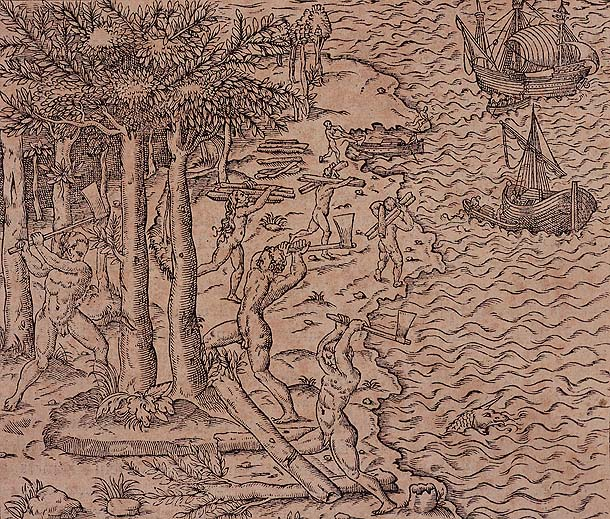
Cutting brazilwood (André Thevet, 1575).

The first French invasion of Brazil took place on the Santo Aleixo Island and lasted from March to December 1531, when they were expelled by Portuguese soldiers. During the occupation, the area was called Île Saint-Alexis.

According to the information on the map by Jacques de Vau de Claye (Le Brésil, 1579), France had a project to conquer the coast of the Northeast region of Brazil between the mouth of the São Domingos River (today's Paraíba River) and the Acaraú River. The image, which shows the weapons of Filippo Strozzi, contains several strategic pieces of information, such as the assistance of about ten thousand indigenous people, including Tapuia people who lived along the inland rivers of Ceará and Rio Grande.

The map also indicates, in the territory corresponding to present-day Paraíba, the São Domingos Bay and the path "where the savages go to get the brazilwood and there are forty leagues of path to the forest" and the so-called "forest where you get the brazilwood", corresponding to the primitive plant formation that flourished in the Paraíba River basin.

The project was abandoned after the French military disaster at the Battle of Vila Franca do Campo, in which Strozzi was killed in the Azores during the 1580 succession crisis in Portugal. However, the Gallic presence persisted in the region, to the extent that Gabriel Soares de Sousa, in his 1587 book Tratado Descritivo do Brasil, lists the places on the coast of Rio Grande do Norte frequented by the French at the time:

- the Itapitanga Sound (Pitininga);
- the Pequeno River, or Baquipé, later called Ceará-mirim, where the French ships penetrated to collect brazilwood from the natives;
- the Grande River, or Potengi, where the French often went to load;
- the port of Búzios, at the mouth of the Pirangi river, where "caravels arrive from the coast in a stream, which flows into the sea";
- the Tabatinga Sound, between the port of Búzios and Itacoatiara (tip of Pipa), "where there is also a beach and shelter for ships, where French vessels used to anchor behind the tip and load up with brazilwood";
- the Aratipicaba Sound (Formosa Bay), "where French ships enter from the reefs and load their cargo".

On the coast of present-day Paraíba, the book also mentions the Traição Bay ("in this bay the French make a lot of ink each year and load many ships with it"), the São Domingos River, where they entered every year "to load the brazilwood and split up what was going to Portugal" and the region between the Ararama (now Gramame) and Abionaviajá (now Abiaí) rivers, where "French ships anchored in the past, and from here they entered inwards".

Other reports confirm that the main port frequented by the French in the Captaincy of Rio Grande was the Potengi River, where English ships were also detained. At this anchorage, the necessary repairs were made to the ships and fresh supplies were obtained. According to Friar Vicente do Salvador, in Rio Grande, the "French would trade with the locals, and from there they would also rob the ships coming and going from Portugal, taking not only their farms but also their people, and selling them to the locals so that they could eat them".

There was a large concentration of French people in the port of Búzios, several of whom were united with Potiguar women. On the Potengi River, about three kilometers above its bar, there are still ruins of an old stone building that may have been a French trading post or stronghold. Their presence in the region ceased with the arrival of troops under the command of Manuel Mascarenhas Homem, captain-major of the Captaincy of Pernambuco, who reached the Potengi Bar on December 25, 1597, beginning the construction of the Fortress of the Three Wise Men, and reinforced by those of Feliciano Coelho de Carvalho, captain-major of the Captaincy of Paraíba, from April 1598.

==== France Antarctique ====
In 1555, an expedition of around one hundred men on two ships, commanded by Nicolas Durand de Villegagnon, sailed into Guanabara Bay with the aim of establishing a colonization nucleus. Initially, they landed on Laje Island (now Fort Tamandaré da Laje) and tried to build a defensive artillery battery, but were driven back by the rising tide. They then headed for the Serigipe Island (now Villegagnon Island), where they settled permanently and established the Fort Coligny.

The so-called France Antarctique was home to Calvinist Protestant settlers and Catholic groups who were trying to avoid the religious wars that were dividing Europe at the time.

In 1558, Villegagnon returned to France after incidents caused by the indiscipline of some settlers who sought out the natives and by feuds between Catholics and Protestants. He sentenced several settlers to death and executed them, sending the Calvinists to the shores of the bay. He returned to Paris to try to convince French couples to embark for Rio de Janeiro and form a city.

==== The Portuguese campaigns ====
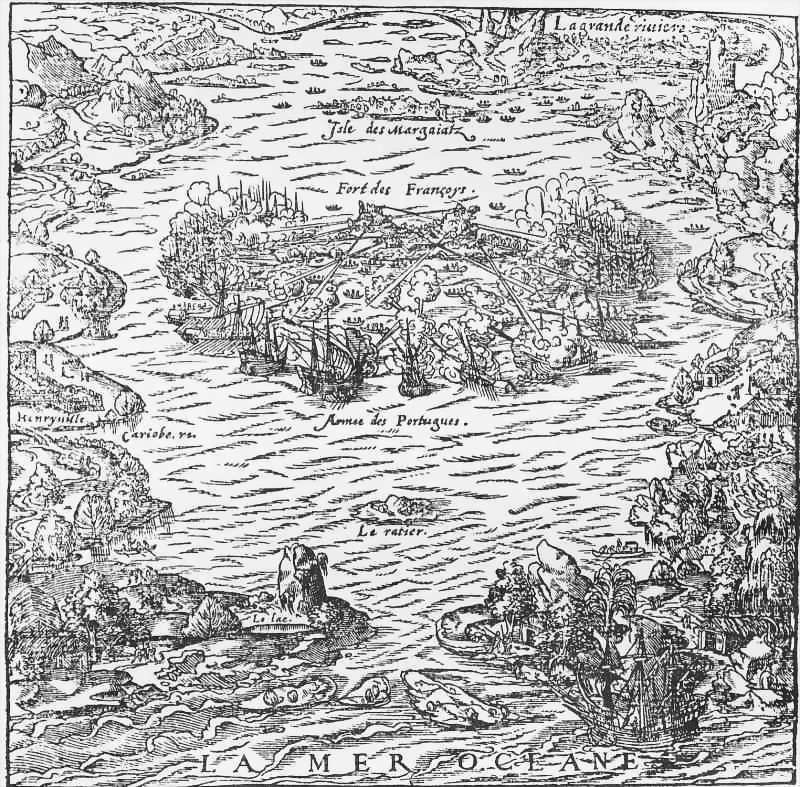
Sketch of Mem de Sá's attack on the French in Guanabara Bay in 1560. Author unknown, 1567

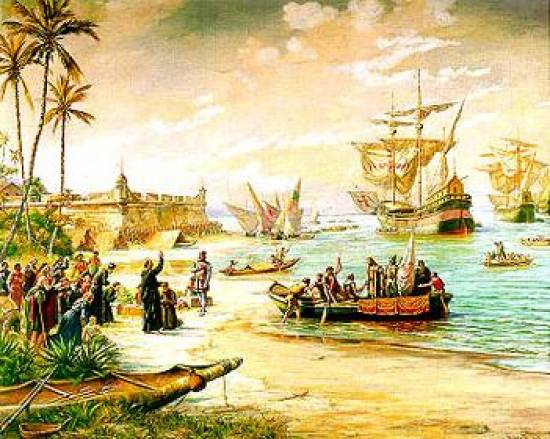
Departing of Estácio de Sá, a painting by Benedito Calixto showing Father Manuel da Nóbrega blessing the squadron that is going to fight the French.

In 1560, an attempt at French colonization was defeated militarily by Estácio de Sá, nephew of Mem de Sá, the third governor-general of Brazil, who, with information about the fort provided by French dissidents Jean de Cointac and Jacques Le Balleur, and reinforcements from the Captaincy of São Vicente, opened fire on the island's defences from his ships on 15 March.

The French survivors who sought refuge with the indigenous tribes in the region were later liquidated by Estácio de Sá, in a campaign that lasted from 1565 to 1567, when the city of São Sebastião do Rio de Janeiro was founded at the bottom of the Morro Cara de Cão.

After the defeat of the French and their indigenous allies in the battles of Glória beach and the present-day Governador Island, the city was moved to the top of the Morro do Descanso, later called Alto da Sé, Alto de São Sebastião, Morro de São Januário and, finally, Morro do Castelo, which was dismantled in 1922.

Even though the attempt to settle in Guanabara Bay failed, the French remained active in other parts of the coast, where they maintained trading posts, such as the Maison de Pierre on the coast of Cabo Frio.

==== Equinoctial France ====
Meanwhile, a second organized attempt at French colonization took place on the Upaon-Açu Island, in Maranhão, from 1594. On September 8, 1612, led by Daniel de La Touche, the French founded the city of São Luís. After the Battle of Guaxenduba on November 19, 1614, the French presence in the region lasted until it was eradicated by Portuguese and indigenous troops in 1615.

==== The privateers ====
Until the 18th century, privateers of different nationalities often looted villages and mills on the Brazilian coast. The discovery of gold in Minas Gerais revived the greed of these elements, attracting them to the coast of the Southeast. The most famous robberies were in August 1710, by the privateer Jean-François Duclerc, and in September 1711, by René Duguay-Trouin, both in the city of Rio de Janeiro.

==== The invasion of Cabo Norte (1697) ====
With the naming of the Marquis of Ferróles as governor of French Guiana in 1678, France started pursuing a more aggressive stance in the region, increasing the number of French entreposts in the Oyapock and trying to cut the Portuguese from the commerce of Drogas do sertão, very valuable commercial products from Amazonian Origin. They would go as far as Gurupá, before being beaten back in 1679.

In 1688, Marquis of Ferróles would penetrate the Portuguese positions in the Araguari River, takin the Araguari fort and claiming the region for France. In 1697 he receives orders by Louis XIV of expanding French territory to the Amazon River, taking the fortress of Desterro, Macapá and Taurege (the latter being an English fort conquered by the Portuguese during the Portuguese Conquest of Maricay). Ferróles would raze the forts of Araguari, Desterro and Taurege and bring a French garrison to the fort of Macapá. The governor of Maranhão, Antônio de Albuquerque Coelho de Carvalho, would raise a force retake the Fort of Macapá in June 28 of the same year.

Due to the alignment of Portugal and France during the earlier parts of War of the Spanish Succession, the two countries would have a peace treaty which slightly favoured France, with a provisory treaty in March 4, 1700, and a permanent treaty in July 18, 1701. After the Peace of Utrecht, France would give up interest in the Brazilian Amazon for the time being.

==== The invasion of Duclerc (1710) ====
During the conflict between France and England, King Louis XIV authorized attacks on the overseas domains of Portugal, a traditional ally of the British. He allowed private individuals to arm their ships and offered them authorization, through letters of marque, to attack the vessels and possessions of enemy foreign powers, including Portugal, in exchange for a share of the profits. For this reason, in mid-August 1710, Jean-François Duclerc, in command of six ships and around 1,200 men, arrived at the bar of Guanabara Bay flying English flags as a disguise. The authorities in Rio de Janeiro, alerted by the Portuguese Crown, were already expecting the arrival of the French privateer and launched a fire attack from the Fortresses of Santa Cruz da Barra and São João, repelling the fleet that was trying to force the bar.

The French sailed southwest along the coast towards the bay of Ilha Grande, sacking farms and mills. There, they landed at the Guaratiba Bar and marched overland to the city of Rio de Janeiro. Along the way, they passed through Camorim, Jacarepaguá, Engenho Novo and Engenho Velho, where they rested. The following day, they continued through the Mangue region, reaching the Santa Teresa Hill (later Mata-Cavalos Street, now Riachuelo Street), as far as Santo Antônio Hill. Through Ajuda Street (today's Melvin Jones) and São José Street, they reached Largo do Carmo (today's XV de Novembro Square), where they encountered resistance from armed inhabitants, especially the students from the Jesuit College, led by Captain Bento do Amaral Coutinho. In this battle, the French lost 400 men. Duclerc, who commanded them, was held under house arrest in what is now Quitanda Street and murdered in mysterious conditions by a group of hooded men on March 18, 1711; some authors believe it was for reasons of passion.

The city's population enthusiastically celebrated the victory for several days. Unfortunately, the colonial authorities overestimated the capacity of the bar's defensive system, spreading the common belief that, after such a defeat, no privateer would ever try to force it again, which proved to be incorrect.

==== The invasion of Duguay - Trouin (1711) ====
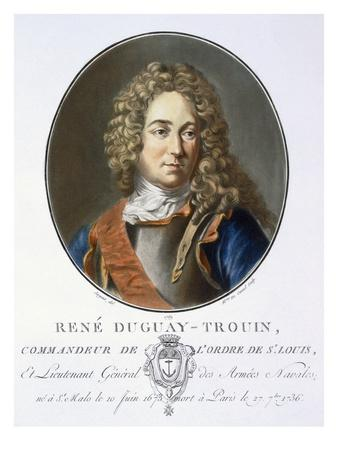
René Duguay-Trouin.

On September 12, 1711, a squadron of 17 or 18 ships, armed with 740 pieces, 10 mortars, 5,764 men and under the command of the French privateer René Duguay-Trouin, entered the Guanabara Bay bar, escaping the fire from the fortresses, which had been evacuated three days earlier, thanks to a report received by the then Governor of the Captaincy of Rio de Janeiro, Francisco de Castro Morais, that claimed the news of the French squadron's arrival was false.

Duguay-Trouin faced resistance from a few inhabitants who disagreed with the decisions of Governor Francisco de Castro Morais: the naturalized Portuguese Norman Gil du Bocage, Field Master Bento do Amaral Coutinho and his companion Friar Francisco de Menezes, along with the students of the Benedictine friars, the sons of Domingos Leitão, Rodrigo de Freitas, Gurgel do Amaral, Teles de Menezes, Martim Clemente and Aires Maldonado.

The success of Duguay-Trouin was expensive for the city, which had to pay a valuable ransom for its freedom: 610,000 cruzados in currency, 100 boxes of sugar and 200 head of cattle.

==== The invasion of Fernando de Noronha ====
On January 16, 1504, King Manuel I of Portugal donated an archipelago to Fernão de Noronha through the hereditary captaincy system, but he and his descendants were not interested in colonizing it. The islands were visited by the Germans (1534), the English (1577) and the French (1556, 1558). In 1612, on his way to Maranhão, Daniel de La Touche stayed there for fifteen days. The Dutch occupied the islands from 1629 to 1654.

In 1736, the French East India Company sent an expedition, under the command of Captain Lesquelin, responsible for the occupation and colonization of Fernando de Noronha. Upon being informed, the viceroy of Brazil, André de Melo e Castro, 4th Count of Galveias, sent investigators to the archipelago on September 28, 1736, with the task of confirming the invasion. Through a Royal Letter of May 26, 1737 sent to the Governor of Pernambuco, Henrique Luís Freire de Andrade, King João V of Portugal ordered the expulsion of the invaders. The viceroy organized an expedition of 250 men, under the command of Colonel João Lobo de Lacerda, who left Pernambuco on 6 October 1737 and expelled the French attackers, returning to Recife on 11 July 1738.

=== Brazil Empire ===
==== Cabanagem ====
The Cabanagem was a popular revolt, centered in Belém, the capital of Pará, but which extended to Amazonas, Roraima and Amapá. Regent Diogo Antônio Feijó asked the Portuguese, British and French for help in containing the revolt, but was rebuffed. France, which claimed ownership of territories in the Brazilian Amazon, was interested in the possible separation of the region. In Amapá, French support for the movement even threatened Brazil's territorial integrity.

=== Brazil Republic ===
==== French intrusion in Amapá ====
The discovery of gold in Amapá at the end of the 19th century rekindled the interest of Brazilians and French in the region. In May 1895, the governor of French Guiana, without authorization from the French government, sent the gunboat Bengali to the municipality of Amapá. A group of 60 soldiers under the command of Captain Lunier disembarked with the mission of freeing the collaborationist Trajano Benitez, who led the Republic of Cunani within France's sphere of influence.

Francisco Xavier da Veiga Cabral led the Brazilian troops against the invasion, killing Lunier and other French soldiers. The French force massacred the civilian population, but Cabral's actions stopped the attack, making him a national hero. The Brazilians and the French appealed to an international arbitration, executed by Walter Hauser, president of Switzerland, which ruled in total favor of Brazil on December 1, 1900.

==== Lobster War ====
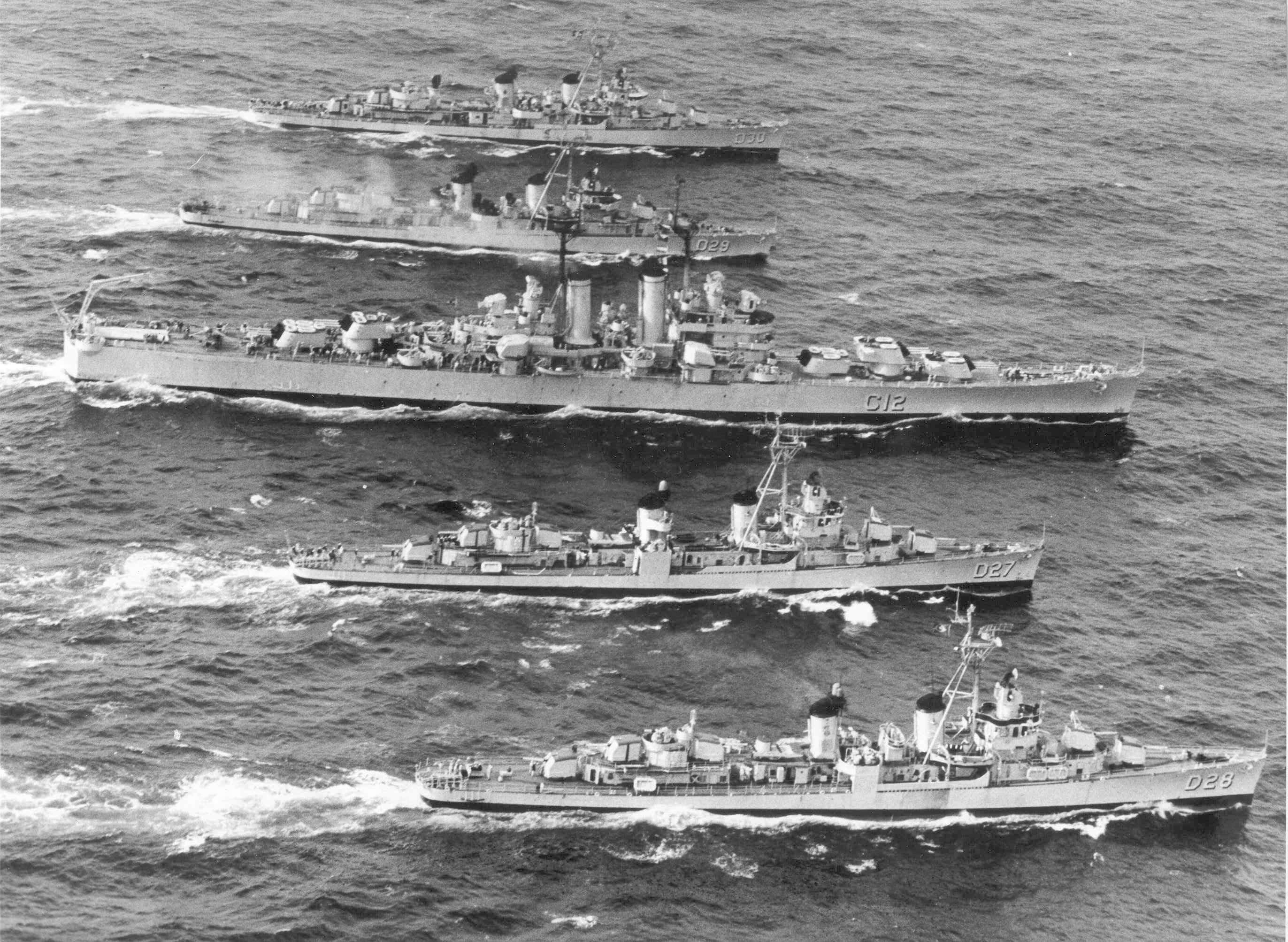
Cruiser C Tamandaré (center) escorted by the Fletcher-class destroyers Pará (D-27), Paraíba (D-28), Paraná (D-29) and Pernambuco (D-30) in 1961, during the Lobster War.

The Lobster War, a conflict that occurred between 1961 and 1963, was centered on the illegal capture of lobsters by French fishing boats in territorial waters off the coast of the Northeast region of Brazil. In 1961, fishermen from Pernambuco alerted the authorities to the presence of international fishing boats in the area. The Brazilian navy and air force began to police the area, prompting France to mobilize its air force, while Brazil prepared a plan to occupy French Guiana in an operation called Operation Cabralzinho. Despite the tensions generated, a real war was avoided.

== See also ==
- Dieppe maps
- Military history of Brazil
- Dutch invasions in Brazil
- French colonial empire
