= Gravatá River =

There are several rivers named Gravatá River in Brazil:

- Gravatá River (Minas Gerais)
- Gravatá River (Paraíba)
- Gravatá River (Pernambuco), a river of Pernambuco

== See also ==
- Gravataí River, Rio Grande do Sul, Brazil
