= Peixe River (Paraíba) =

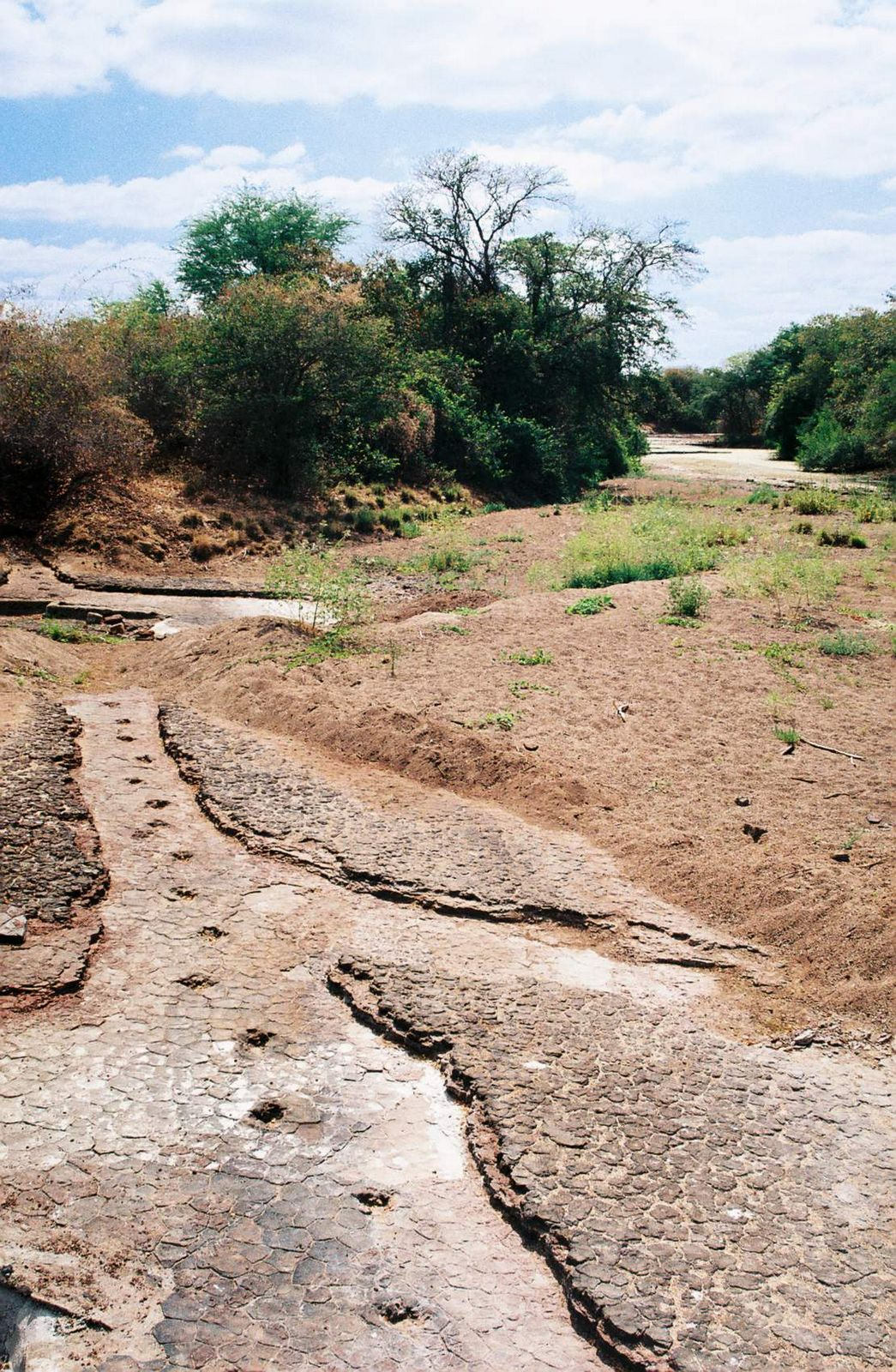

Location
- Country: Brazil

Physical characteristics
- Source
  - location: Paraíba state
  - coordinates: 6°25′39″S 38°30′2″W
- Mouth
  - location: Aparecida, Paraíba
  - coordinates: 6°48′27″S 38°5′15″W

The Peixe River is a river of Paraíba state in northeastern Brazil. It rises near Poço Dantas, and discharges into the Piranhas River.

It runs through the Valley of the Dinosaurs, a protected area holding dinosaur tracks, and gives its name to the municipality of São João do Rio do Peixe.

== See also ==
- List of rivers of Paraíba
