= Guandu River =

There are several rivers named Guandu River Brazil.

- Guandu River (Espírito Santo)
- Guandu River (Paraíba)
- Guandu River (Rio de Janeiro)
- Guandu-Mirim River

== See also ==
- Guandu (disambiguation)
