= Ribeira River =

Ribeira River may refer to:

- Ribeira de Iguape River, in the states of Paraná and São Paulo, Brazil
- Ribeira River (Paraíba), in the state of Paraíba, Brazil
- Ribeira River (Paraná), in the state of Paraná, Brazil
