= Tapera River =

There are two rivers named Tapera River Brazil:

- Tapera River (Paraíba)
- Tapera River (Paraná)
