= Jacoca River =

There are two rivers named Jacoca River in Brazil:

- Jacoca River (Paraíba)
- Jacoca River (Sergipe)
