= Sombrio River =

Sombrio River may refer to:

- Sombrio River (Brazil), a tributary of the Curimataú River in Paraíba state, Brazil
- Sombrio River (Canada), on Vancouver Island in British Columbia, Canada
