= Taperoá =

Taperoá may refer to

- Taperoá, Bahia, a municipality in the Brazilian state of Bahia
- Taperoá, Paraíba, a municipality in the Brazilian state of Paraíba
- Taperoá River, a river of the Brazilian state of Paraíba
