= Pirari River =

Coordinates: 6°31′S 35°18′W

Location
- Country: Brazil

Physical characteristics
- Source
  - location: Paraíba state

The Pirari River is a river of Paraíba state in northeastern Brazil.

== See also ==
- List of rivers of Paraíba
