= Gurinhém River =

Coordinates: 7°11′S 35°11′W

Location
- Country: Brazil

Physical characteristics
- Source
  - location: Paraíba state

The Gurinhém River is a river of Paraíba state in western Brazil.

== See also ==
- List of rivers of Paraíba
