= Sanhauá River =

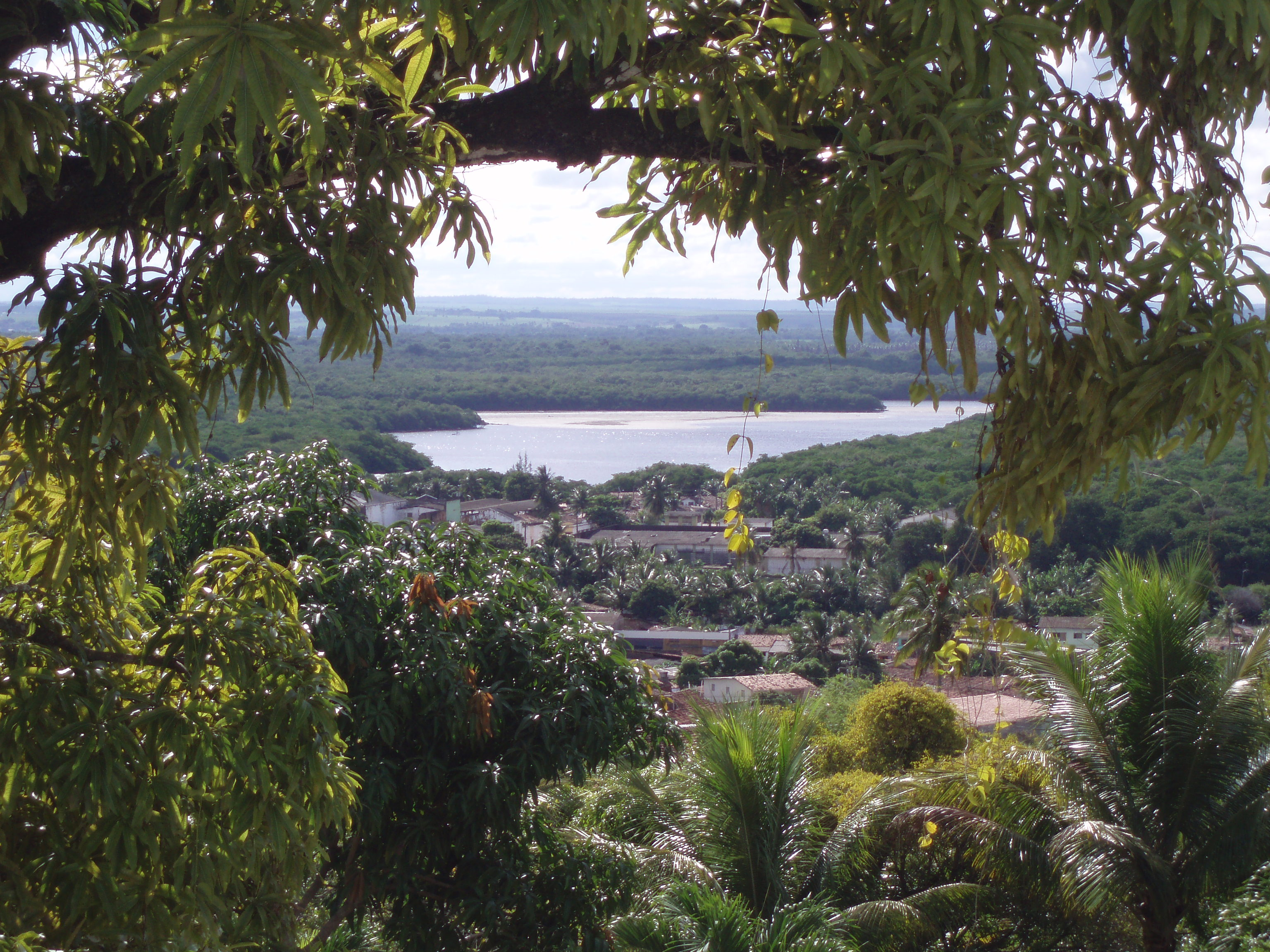

Location
- Country: Brazil

Physical characteristics
- Source
  - location: Paraíba state

The Sanhauá River is a river of Paraíba state in northeastern Brazil. It is heavily impacted by human activity, including sewage and waste discharge, which affects its water quality. Despite pollution, it is still used by locals for activities like fishing and bathing.

== Uses ==
The main uses of Sanhauá river water in the former Roger's open dump area are for fishing, crustacean and shellfish collection, and primary/secondary contact activities like bathing and navigation. The river also serves as a recipient for sewage, solid waste, and leachate due to a lack of proper sewage and waste disposal infrastructure for nearby homes.

== See also ==
- List of rivers of Paraíba
