= Santo Aleixo Island =

Island on the southern coast of Pernambuco, Brazil

Ilha de Santo Aleixo
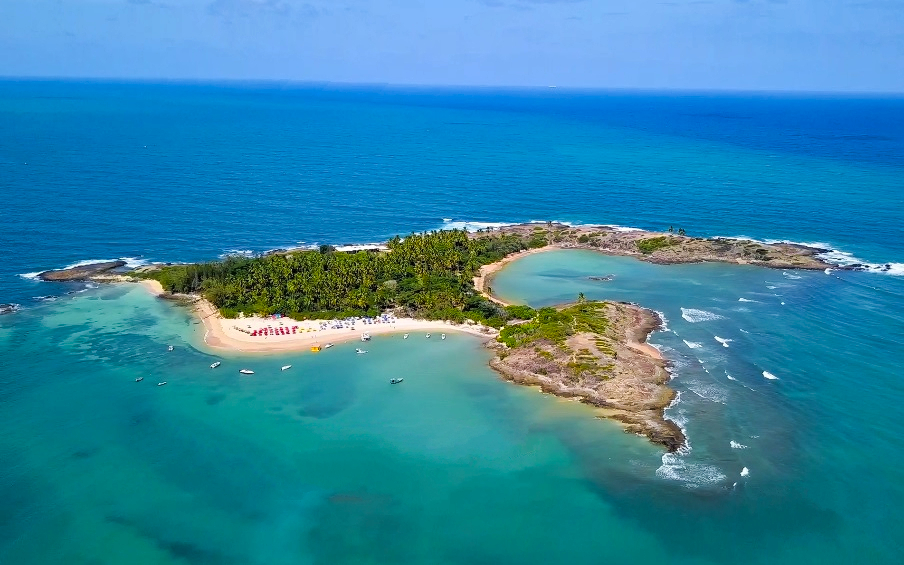
- A panoramic view of the island, with Praia dos Pernambucanos to the southwest and Praia da Holanda to the northeast, next to Enseada Espanha e França.

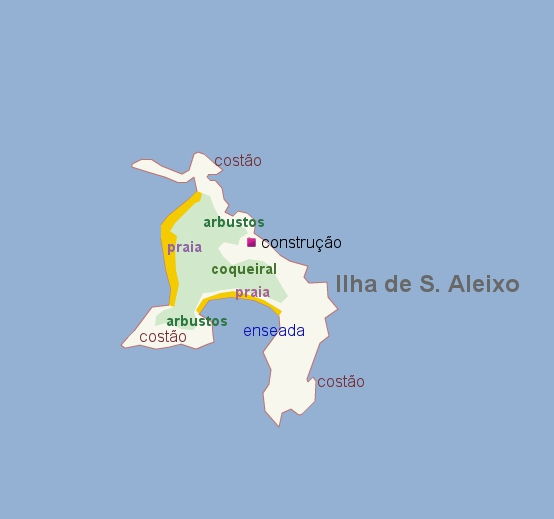
- Santo Aleixo Island's physical features

- Location in Brazil

Geography
- Location: Atlantic Ocean
- Coordinates: 8°36′43.57″S 35°1′22.21″W
- Area: 30.49 ha (75.3 acres)
- Highest elevation: 5 m (16 ft)

Administration
- Brazil

Demographics
- Population: 0

Santo Aleixo Island is a Brazilian island located on the southern coast of Pernambuco, northeastern region of Brazil. It has two beaches, with natural pools: Praia dos Pernambucanos, with bar services and most visited by tourists, and Praia da Holanda, which has a quieter atmosphere and can be reached on a short walk.

There is also Enseada Espanha and França, which is geographically linked to the second beach.

Administratively, the island is part of Sirinhaém, although it's privately owned.

It is located between Porto de Galinhas and Praia dos Carneiros.

== History ==
In 1527, the Spanish navigator Rodrigo Acuña, on his way back to Spain, was shipwrecked off the coast of Pernambuco and landed with some companions on the island, where he recovered after finding food and providing himself with essential utensils.

Historiography gives the following account of this misfortune:

Entrusted to [divine] providence, they sailed the seas for twenty days, nourishing themselves only with some shellfish and a few fruits picked up along the coast, until they came across God's harbor on the Santo Aleixo island, where they were able to recover. On this island they had the good fortune to find some wheat flour, a barrel of wet cookies and an oven (...). (Note: These provisions and utensils were most likely left behind by the various corsairs who visited the island quite frequently.)

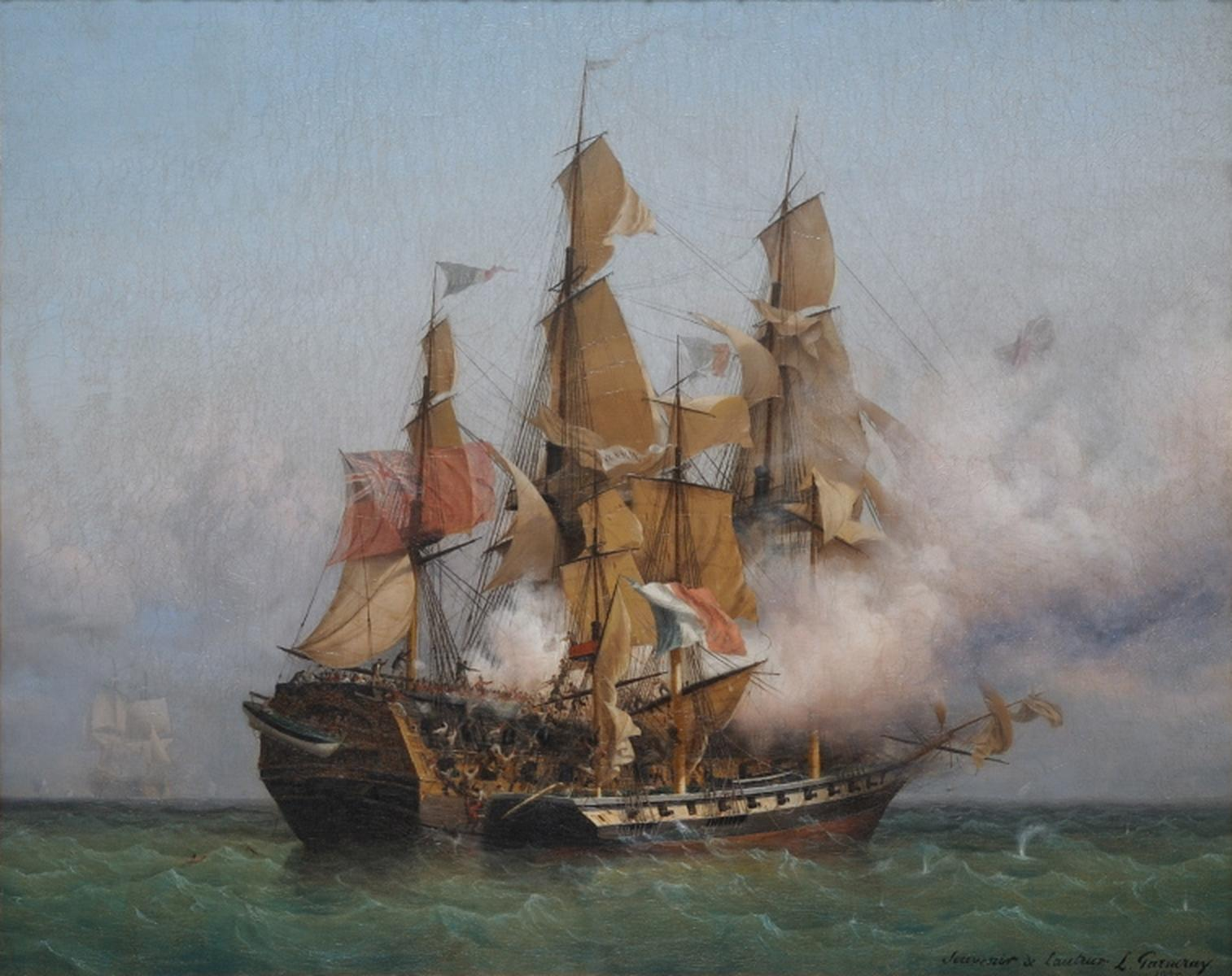
French privateer ship in battle (Painting by Ambroise Louis Garneray).

It was also on the Santo Aleixo island that the first French invasion in Brazil took place, from March to December 1531, when they were repelled by Portuguese soldiers. During the French occupation, the island was called "île Saint-Alexis".

These invasions, which would become successive, had as their main objective the collection of "pau-de-tinta", as brazilwood was then known.

At the end of the 17th century, while campaigning against the quilombolas of Palmares, the government of Pernambuco was trying to destabilize the many pirates who were still ravaging the region.

In 1687, the local authorities were very concerned about a group of corsairs from the Netherlands who were based on the Santo Aleixo Island and who, from there, set off to plunder the coast of Pernambuco.

== Features ==
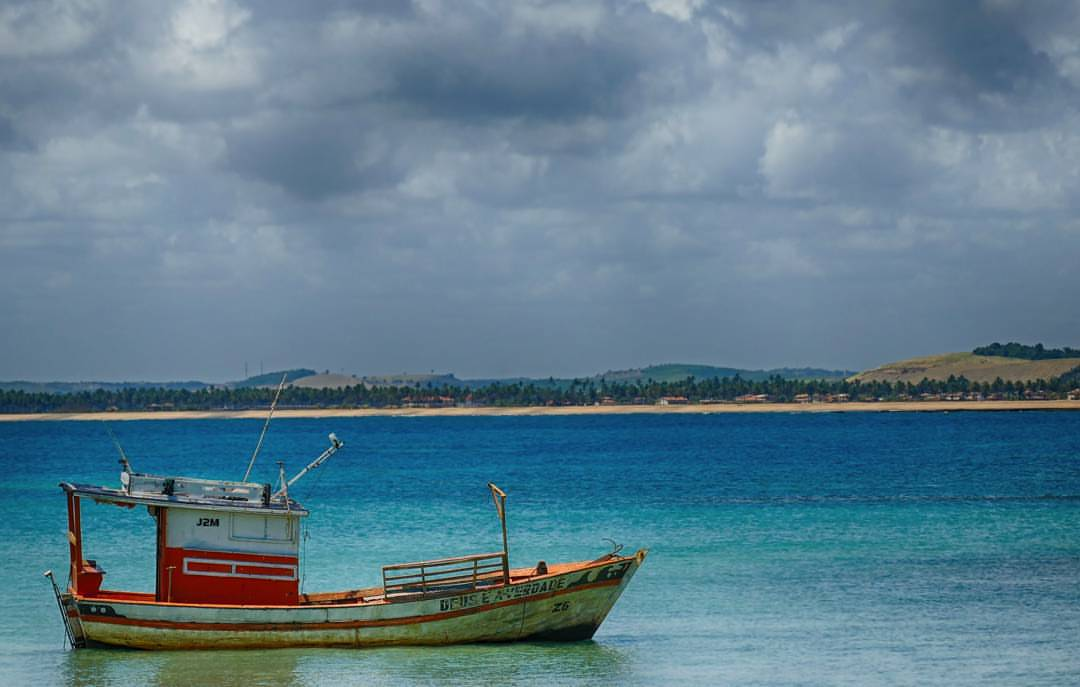
Southwestern part of the island, at Praia dos Pernambucanos, with the town of Sirinhaém in the background

Located in the open sea, about two kilometers east of Barra do Sirinhaém, Santo Aleixo Island is shaped slightly like a horseshoe. To the west there is a sandy beach, while to the south there is a cove protected by rocky cliffs and a beach with a large open pool of calm, warm and transparent greenish waters. To the east there is a rocky coastline that is not very accessible.

Santo Aleixo Island has a surface area of 30.49 hectares (75.3 acres) and is formed by volcanic rocks originally covered by shrubby coastal vegetation, which was gradually replaced by the introduction of coconut groves. Because of the quality of its waters - unpolluted and crystal clear due to its distance from the coast - the island is popular among snorkelers (apnea).

With no fixed residents or tourist infrastructure, there is only one four-bedroom house on the island, which has been rented out occasionally by the owners. Santo Aleixo Island has also been used by fishermen and agencies, who ferry tourists in boats and speedboats, although this practice is likely to cease if the project to build a resort on the site is successful.

== Development ==
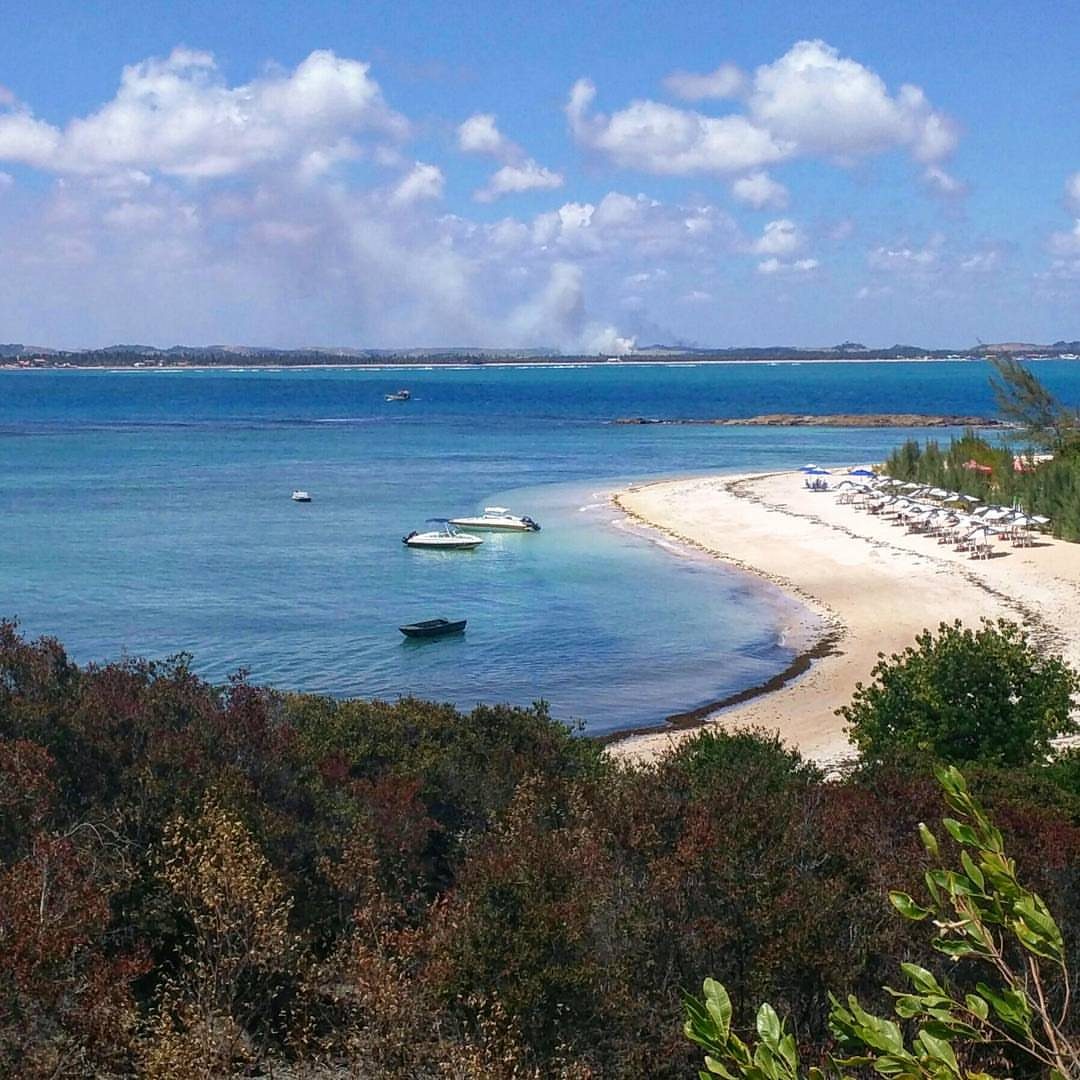
West side of the island, at Praia da Holanda, with the municipality of Sirinhaém in the background.

Santo Aleixo Island is located in the Guadalupe Environmental Protection Area (APA), which prompted the creation of a task force for its preservation. Since the beginning of 2015, the NGO Andrade Brasil has been researching and mapping the island's main needs in order to develop, together with the APA management, Ibama and SPU, the preservation of the area, organizing voluntary actions with the support of the public authorities and the local community.

With the support of the private sector, the Federal Government, the State Government and Sirinhaém's Town Hall - the municipality which the island is part of - to train the population of Barra de Sirinhaém/PE and monitor activities at the site, from diving to mooring boats, including the way tourist tours are marketed and how food and drink are handled at the site.

The non-governmental organization's volunteers include qualified professionals such as lawyers, tourism experts, social workers, health and environmental professionals, and it is constantly raising awareness by offering free lectures and professional training courses to the community on the south coast of Pernambuco. The initiative mobilizes residents, vacationers and businesspeople interested in collaborating with the sustainable development of local tourism, in order to avoid impacts on the environment.

The jointly developed programs are seen as a short-term solution for the preservation of Santo Aleixo Island. With the support of Sirinhaém's Town Hall, the State Environment Agency (CPRH), the Superintendence of the Union's Patrimony (SPU), Ibama and the Brazilian Navy, the non-governmental organization hopes that, with the support of the community and public management, actions will be developed to curb natural depredation, such as regulating the flow of boats and controlling visitors to Santo Aleixo Island, as well as raising awareness to intensify the cleaning and conservation of the natural heritage.

== See also ==
- Porto de Galinhas
- Fernando de Noronha
- List of islands of Brazil
- Tourism in Brazil
