= Guandu =

Guandu may refer to:

- Battle of Guandu (官渡之戰), a battle between Cao Cao and Yuan Shao in the Three Kingdoms period
- Guandu Station (關渡站), a station of the Taipei Metro
- Guandu District (官渡区), Kunming, People's Republic of China

== Towns (官渡镇) ==
- Guandu, in Potou District, Zhanjiang, Guangdong
- Guandu, Liuyang, in Liuyang City, Hunan

== See also ==
- Guandu River (disambiguation)
