= Valley of the Dinosaurs, Paraíba =

Area in Brazil

Valley of the Dinosaurs Area of Relevant Ecological Interest
- Área de Relevante Interesse Ecológico Vale dos Dinossauros
- IUCN category IV (habitat/species management area)
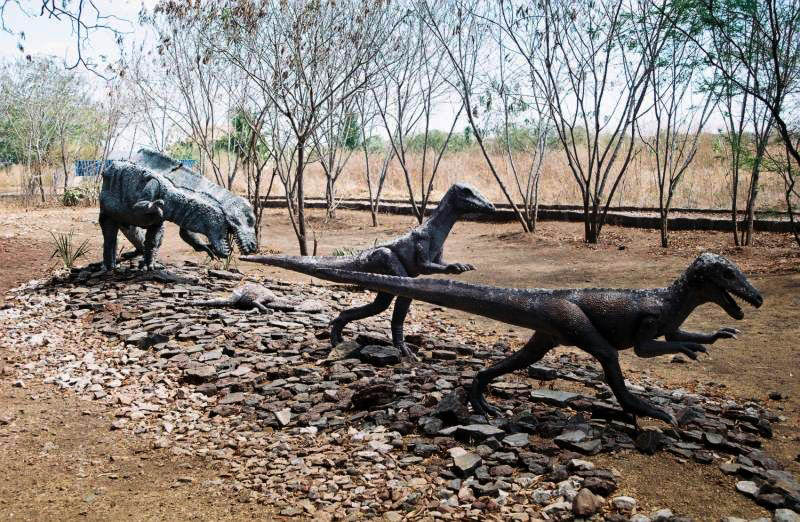
- Models of dinosaurs in the park

- Location within Brazil
- Nearest city: Sousa, Paraíba
- Coordinates: 6.732336°S 38.261917°W
- Area: 145.79 hectares (360.3 acres)
- Designation: Area of relevant ecological interest
- Created: 18 December 1984
- Website: www.valedosdinossauros.com.br

The Valley of the Dinosaurs (Portuguese: Vale dos Dinossauros) is an area in the state of Paraíba, Brazil, that contains many fossilized dinosaur tracks. It contains the Valley of the Dinosaurs Area of Relevant Ecological Interest, a sustainable use area of relevant ecological interest. This in turn contains the smaller and fully protected Valley of the Dinosaurs Natural Monument. In 2015–16 there was concern that renovations to the tourist attraction, which had been delayed through lack of funding, might not be respecting the integrity of the site.

== Location ==
The Valley of the Dinosaurs is an area in the sedimentary basin of the Peixe River that holds over 50 types of ancient animal tracks, including those of stegosaurids, allosauroids and iguanodonts. The valley covers an area of about 700 square kilometres (270 sq mi) that includes the city of Sousa, Paraíba, and ten other municipalities. It is in a Caatinga biome. Tracks have been found in about 30 locations in the valley, with fossilized footprints of over 80 species at about 20 different stratographic levels. Most of the tracks are of carnivorous dinosaurs.

The tracks the dinosaurs made in the damp earth beside ponds and rivers in rainy periods hardened over long periods of drought, gained new layers of sand and clay from floods, and fossilized. Footprints are as small as 5 centimetres (2.0 in), perhaps from dinosaurs the size of modern chickens, up to 40 centimetres (16 in) long, such as that of a four-ton iguanodon. The most visited site is the island called the Passagem das Pedras (Crossing of Stones) in the bed of the Peixe River. This is about 7 kilometres (4.3 mi) from the urban centre of Sousa.

== History ==
The dinosaur tracks were discovered by a local farmer, Anísio Fausto Silva, in the late 19th century. At the start of the 20th century the engineer Luciano Jacques de Moraes began to study them scientifically. Although not a trained palaeontologist, Moraes gave detailed descriptions with drawings of the tracks for publication in the book Serras e Montanhas do Nordeste (1924).

The Área de Relevante Interesse Ecológico Vale dos Dinossauros was established on 18 December 1984 and is administered by the Chico Mendes Institute for Biodiversity Conservation (ICMBio). The protected area covers 145.79 hectares (360.3 acres). It is in the Sousa municipality of the state of Paraíba. The Valley of the Dinosaurs Natural Monument was created in 2002 by the municipality of Souza. This is a fully protected natural monument of about 40 hectares (99 acres).

There were plans to divert the Peixe River, which flooded the tracks in the rainy season. A R$1.3 million renovation was funded by the federal government and Petrobras, and the site was reopened on 24 May 2013. Work included renovation of the museum, restructuring of the exhibition space, auditorium, offices and bathrooms, and changes to the external area including delimitation of parking spaces, paving of paths and walkways and upgrades to lookout gazebos to meet accessibility standards. Suspended walkways let the visitors view 50 fossilized footprints of the carnivorous noasauridae and 53 of the herbivore Iguanodon.

== Conservation ==
The Area of Relevant Ecological Interest is classed as IUCN protected area category IV (habitat/species management area), whose purpose is to maintain natural ecosystems of regional or local importance and regulate use of these areas to make it compatible with the nature conservation objectives.

In December 2015 it was reported that the Valley of the Dinosaurs was in a state of neglect, and renovations had been suspended. The replica of Tyrannosaurus Rex had been destroyed, access roads were covered by scrub, there were hundreds of cobblestones around the entrance, piles of sand and other problems. Reporters found that the work had been abandoned due to delays in releasing funding to the company charged with work on the site.

In February 2016 the Federal Public Ministry (MPF) in Sousa recommended that Paraíba Office of Environment Administration (SUDEMA) prepare the management plan for the natural monument within 90 days defining steps to ensure the integrity and protection of natural resources of the site, and steps taken to integrate it into the social and economic life of the surrounding communities. The MPF also recommended that SUDEMA give a detailed report within 30 days on the work carried out by the Sousa Prefecture in the Valley of Dinosaurs, which should be limited to protecting the integrity of the unit. If the prefecture's work was not limited to this, MPF said that SUDEMA should take administrative measures to stop the work.

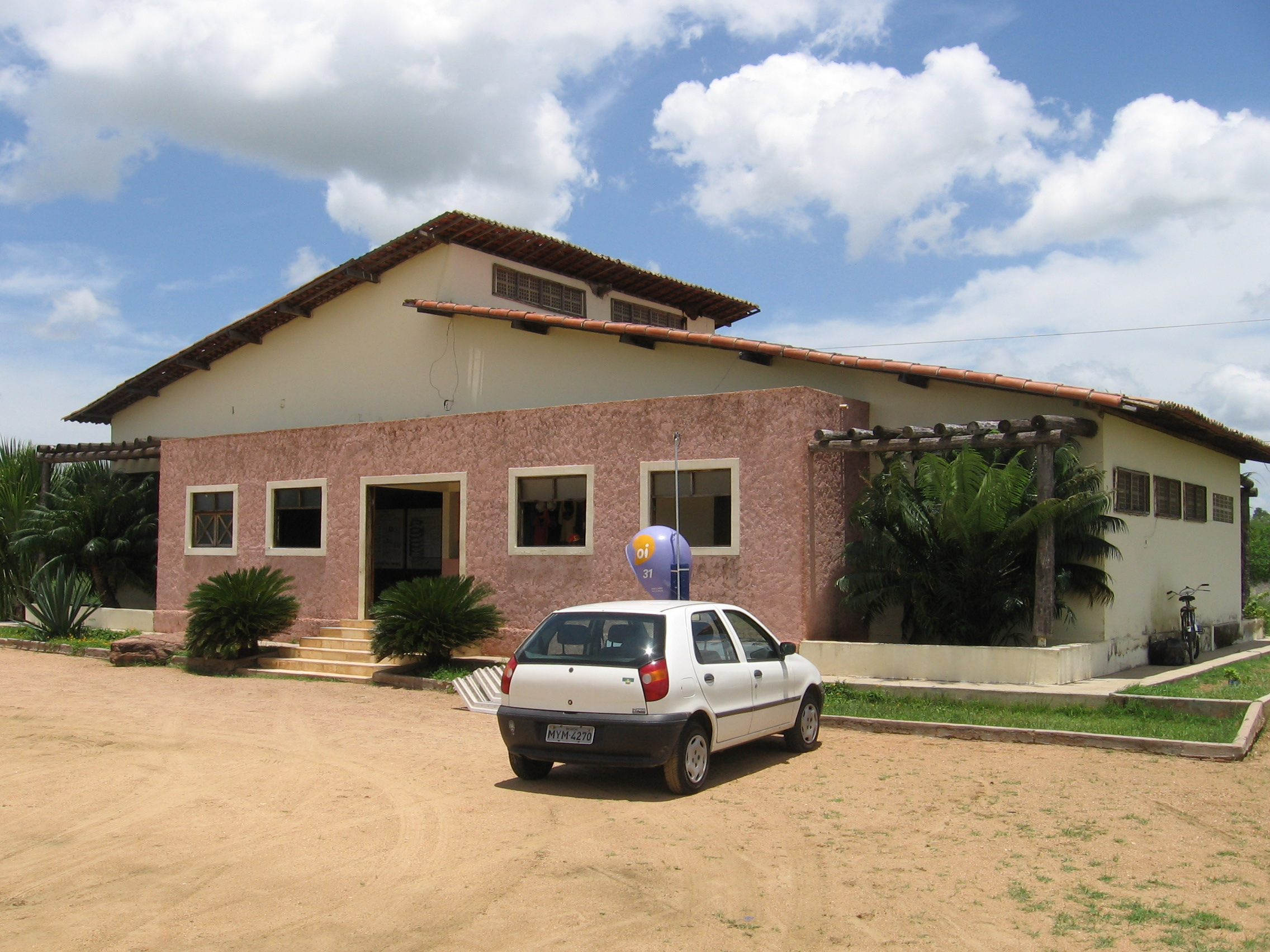
Dinosaur museum, Sousa

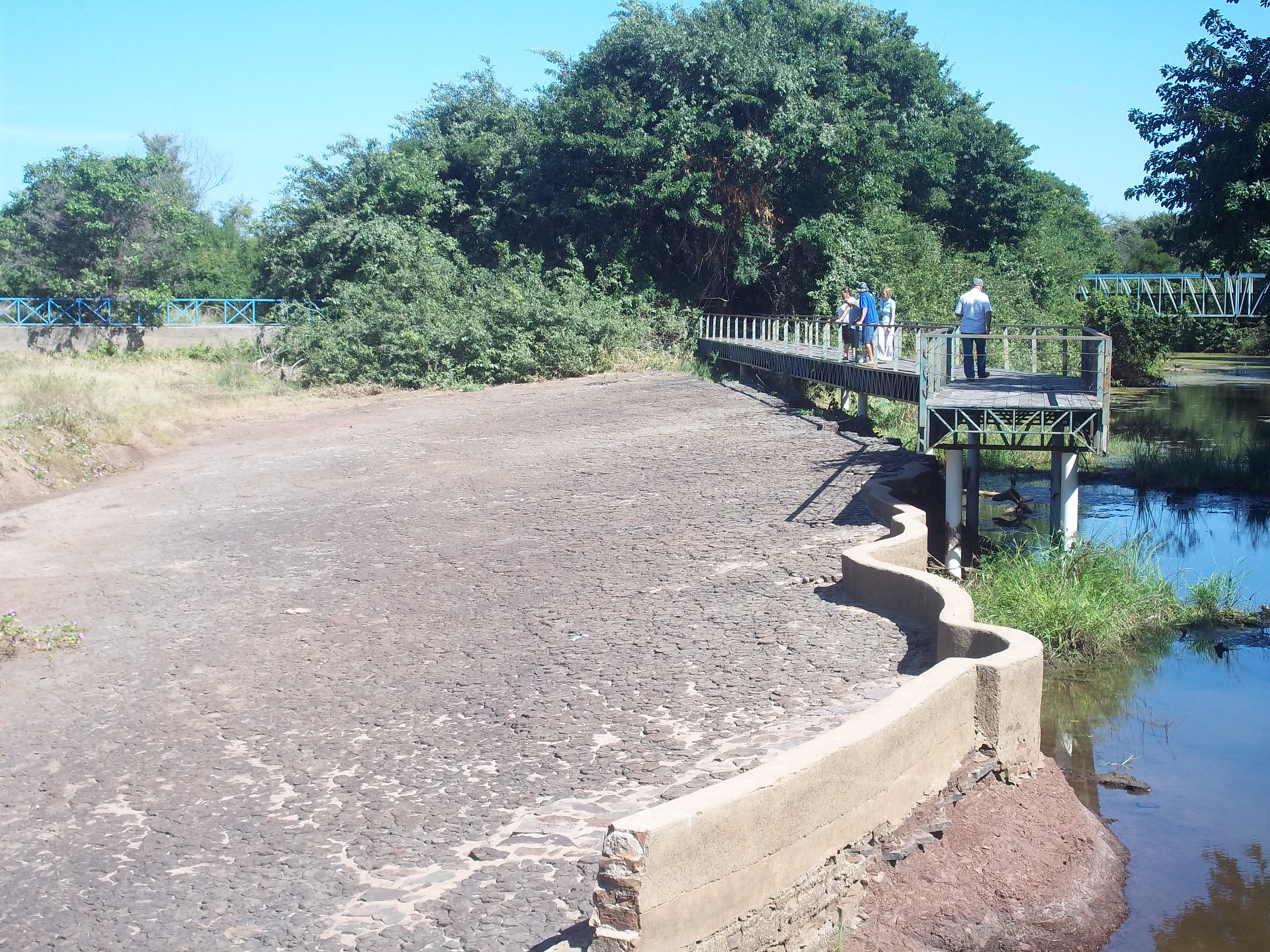
Archaeological site

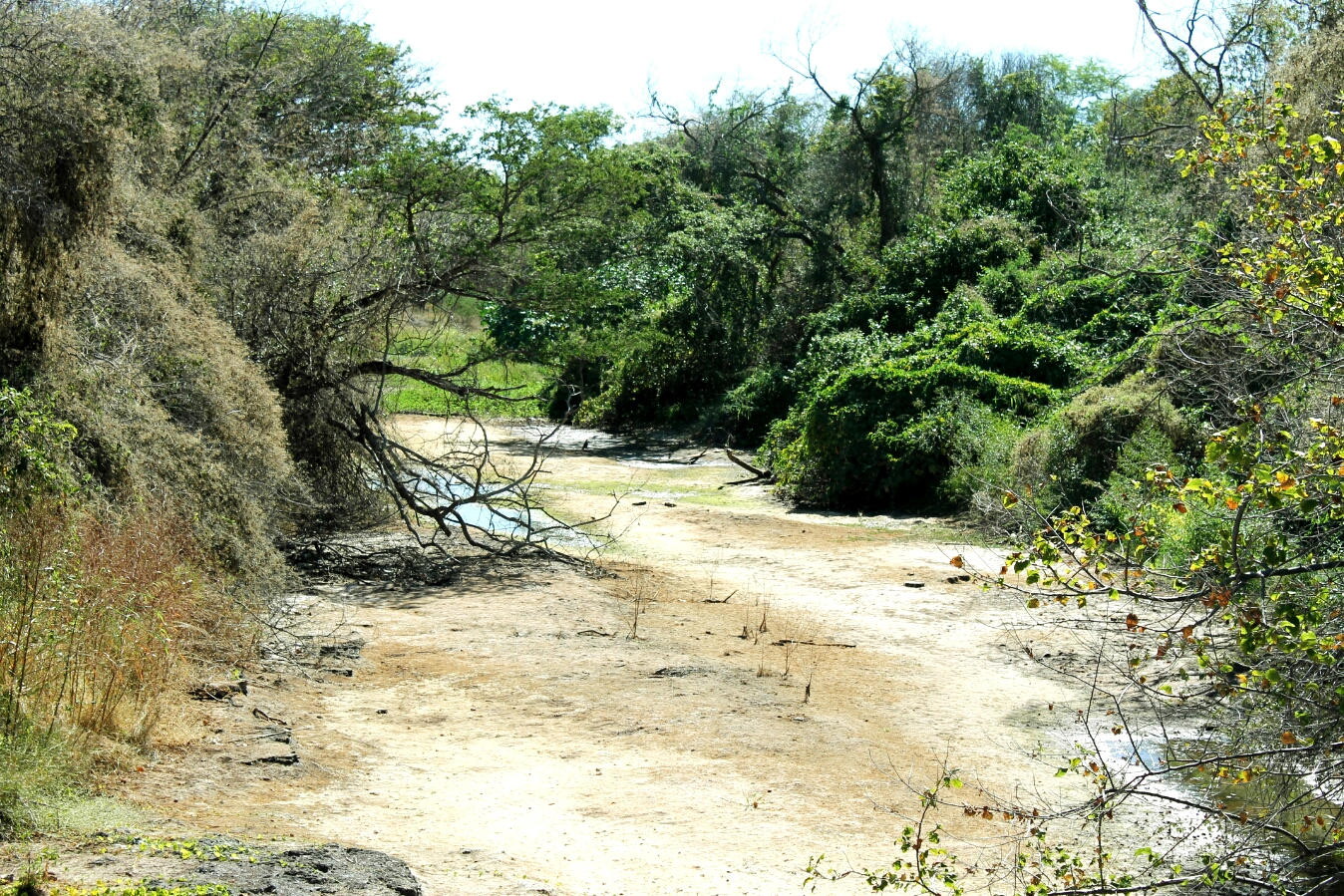
River bed

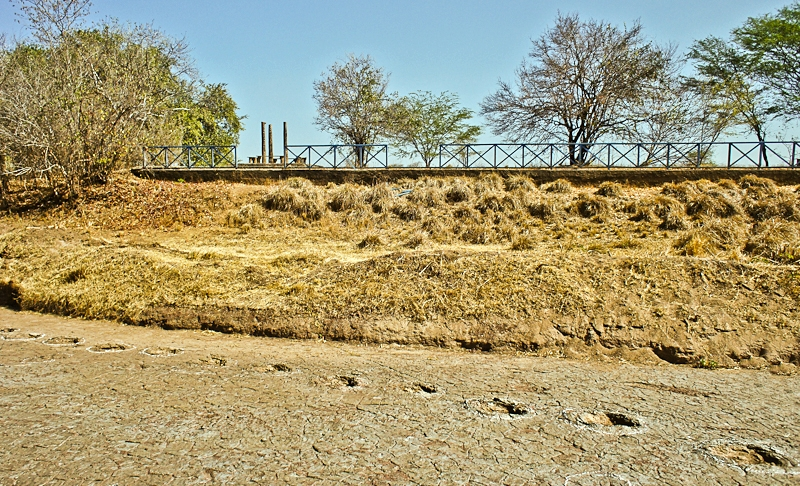
Fossilized tracks

== Sources ==
- Arie Vale dos Dinossauros (in Portuguese), Chico Mendes Institute for Biodiversity Conservation, archived from the original on 2016-08-11
- Complexo Turístico "Vale dos Dinossauros" (in Portuguese), Vale dos Dinossauros, archived from the original on 2016-03-06
- Eduardo Vessoni (27 February 2014), Nas pegadas dos dinossauros, no sertão da Paraíba (in Portuguese), archived from the original on 2018-04-10
- Gutemberg Cardoso (2015-12-26), "Vale dos Dinossauros está abandonado, obra de reforma está paralisada; montes de areia e pedras estão espalhados no local", Polêmica Paraíba (in Portuguese)
- Marcelo Russo, "Vale dos Dinossauros - PB - Jun/01", Revista Turismo (in Portuguese), archived from the original on 2008-10-11
- Monumento Natural Vale dos Dinossauros, Sousa-PB (in Portuguese), SPU - Secretaria do Patrimônio da União, archived from the original on 2015-02-09
- "MPF/PB recomenda que Sudema tome providências na preservação do Vale dos Dinossauros", Paraíba Online (in Portuguese), 5 February 2016
- Unidade de Conservação: Área de Relevante Interesse Ecológico Vale dos Dinossauros (in Portuguese), MMA: Ministério do Meio Ambiente
- "Vale dos Dinossauros", Braziliana (in Portuguese), archived from the original on 2016-06-03
- Vale dos Dinossauros é reaberto em Sousa, no Sertão da Paraíba (in Portuguese), g1 Globo Paraíba, 25 May 2013
