= Aterro River =

Coordinates: 7°26′18″S 34°50′54″W

Location
- Country: Brazil

Physical characteristics
- Source
  - location: Paraíba state

The Aterro River is a river of Paraíba state in northeastern Brazil.

== See also ==
- List of rivers of Paraíba
