= Mumbaba River =

Coordinates: 7°12′44″S 34°54′18″W

Mamuaba River

Location
- Country: Brazil

Physical characteristics
- Source
  - location: Paraíba state

The Mamuaba River is a river of Paraíba state in western Brazil.

== See also ==
- List of rivers of Paraíba
