= Paroeira River =

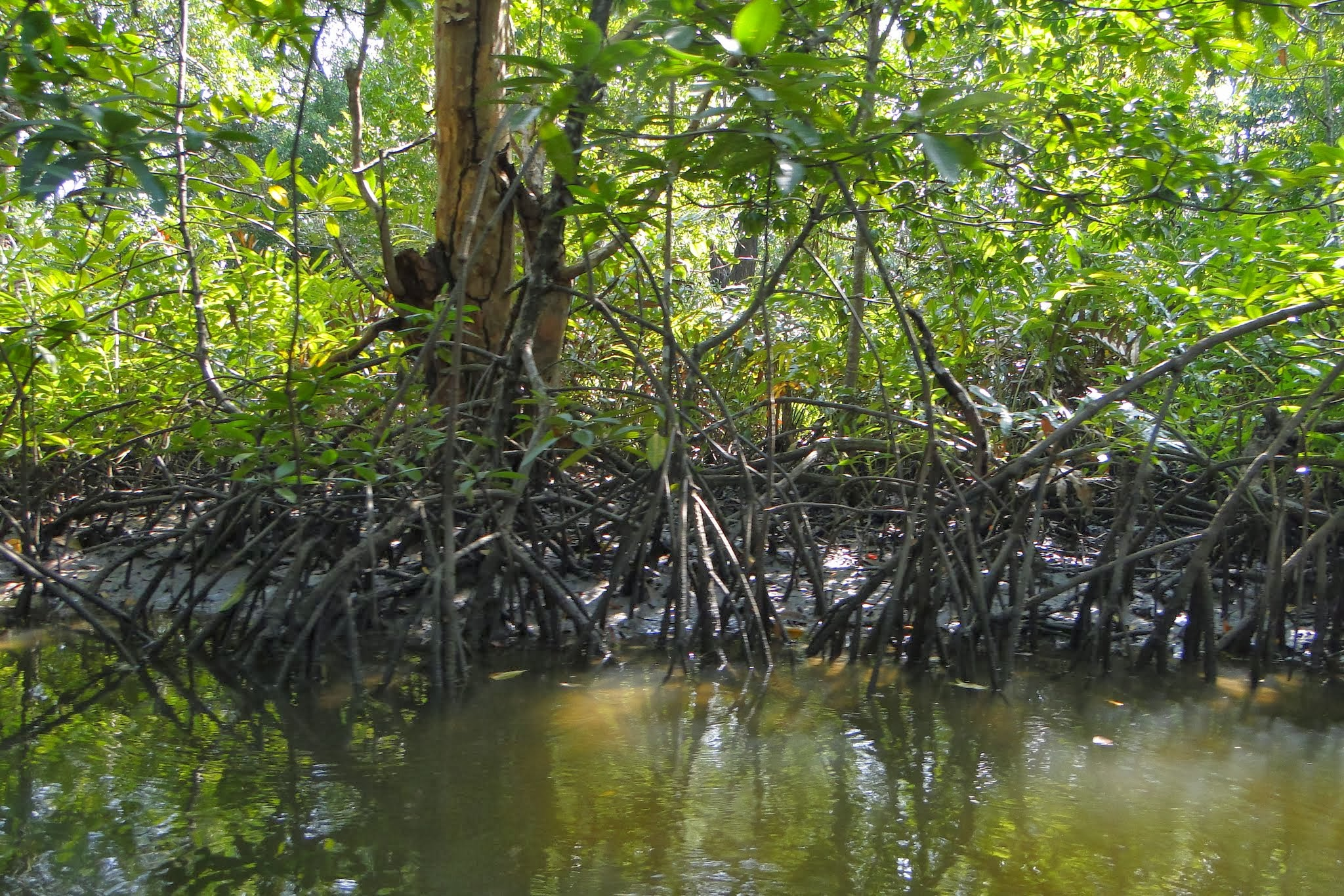

Location
- Country: Brazil

Physical characteristics
- Source
  - location: Paraíba state

The Paroeira River is a river of Paraíba state in northeastern Brazil.

== See also ==
- List of rivers of Paraíba
