= Jenipapo River =

Location
- Country: Brazil

Physical characteristics
- Source
  - location: Paraíba state

The Jenipapo River is a river of Paraíba state in northeastern Brazil. The river, or creek, flows from east to west, towards the Atlantic Ocean. The river and the area surrounding it was first explored by Sir Richard Francis Burton The Battle of Jenipapo was fought near the river as part of the Brazilian War of Independence in 1823.

== See also ==
- List of rivers of Paraíba
