= Piancó River =

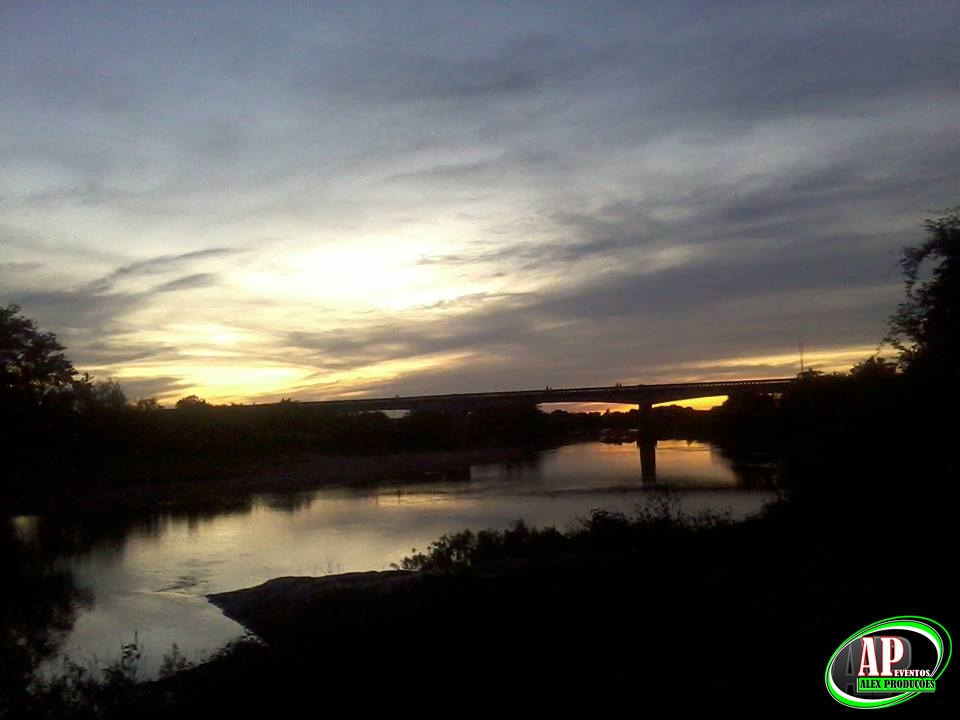

- Location within Brazil

Location
- Country: Brazil

Physical characteristics
- Source
  - location: Paraíba state

The Piancó River is a river in northeastern Brazil, in the state of Paraíba and the municipality of Pombal.

== See also ==
- List of rivers of Paraíba
