= Miriri River =

Coordinates: 6°52′S 34°54′W

Location
- Country: Brazil

Physical characteristics
- Source
  - location: Paraíba state

The Miriri River is a river of Paraíba state in eastern Brazil.

== See also ==
- List of rivers of Paraíba
