= Estiva River =

Location
- Country: Brazil

Physical characteristics
- Source
  - location: Paraíba state
- Mouth: Atlantic Ocean
  - coordinates: 6°45′12″S 34°56′25″W

The Estiva River is a river of Paraíba state in northeastern Brazil.

== See also ==
- List of rivers of Paraíba
