= Ribeira River (Paraíba) =

- Location within Brazil
- Native name: Rio Ribeira (Portuguese)

Location
- Country: Brazil

Physical characteristics
- Source
  - location: Paraíba state
- Mouth
  - coordinates: 7.065730°S 34.902514°W

The Ribeira River (Portuguese: Rio Ribeira) is a short river of Paraíba state in northeastern Brazil.

== Course ==
The Ribeira River rises to the west of the PB-025 road from BR-101 to Lucena, and flows east. It joins the Una River, which in turn is a tributary of the Paraíba River, to the north of the city of João Pessoa.

== See also ==
- List of rivers of Paraíba
