= São José dos Cordeiros River =

Coordinates: 7°21′S 36°36′W

Location
- Country: Brazil

Physical characteristics
- Source
  - location: Paraíba state

The São José dos Cordeiros River is a river of Paraíba state in western Brazil.

== See also ==
- List of rivers of Paraíba
