= Una River (Paraíba) =

Location
- Country: Brazil

Physical characteristics
- Source
  - location: Paraíba state

The Una River is a small river in the Paraíba state in northeastern Brazil. It is located near Sapé and Cruz do Espírito Santo in the Mata Paraibana mesoregion.

It has a dam on it that forms Aç Pe Azevedo lake, and it flows into Salvador River (Paraíba). It is no longer than 15 km.

== See also ==
- List of rivers of Paraíba
