= Guaji River =

Location
- Country: Brazil

Physical characteristics
- Source
  - location: Paraíba state

The Guaji River is a river of Paraíba state in western Brazil.

== See also ==
- List of rivers of Paraíba
