= Abiaí River =

Coordinates: 7.4333333°S 34.8°W

Abial River

Location
- Country: Brazil

Physical characteristics
- Source
  - location: Paraíba state

The Abial River is a river of Paraíba state in western Brazil.

== See also ==
- List of rivers of Paraíba
