= Nazarezinho =

- Municipality
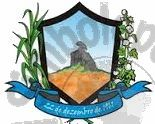
- Coat of arms

- Location in Brazil
- Coordinates: 6°54′S 38°20′W
- Country: Brazil
- Region: Northeast
- State: Paraíba
- Mesoregion: Sertao Paraibana

Area
  - Total: 193.2 km^{2} (74.6 sq mi)
- Elevation: 356 m (1,168 ft)

Population (2021)
  - Total: 7,271
  - Density: 37.63/km^{2} (97.47/sq mi)
- Time zone: UTC−3 (BRT)

Nazarezinho is a municipality in the state of Paraíba in the Northeast Region of Brazil. As of the year 2021, its total population is 7,271.

== Geography ==
Nazarezinho is located on the western part of Paraíba, to the south of Rio Piranhas. Its average elevation is 356 meters above the sea level.

== Climate ==
Nazarezinho has a Hot Semi-arid Climate (BSh). It sees the most rainfall in March, with 137 mm of average precipitation; and the least in September, with 1 mm of average precipitation.

Climate data for Nazarezinho
Month	Jan	Feb	Mar	Apr	May	Jun	Jul	Aug	Sep	Oct	Nov	Dec	Year
Mean daily maximum °C (°F)	33.1 (91.6)	32.3 (90.1)	31.5 (88.7)	31.3 (88.3)	31.5 (88.7)	31 (88)	31.3 (88.3)	32.7 (90.9)	34.3 (93.7)	35 (95)	35.2 (95.4)	34.4 (93.9)	32.8 (91.1)
Daily mean °C (°F)	28.1 (82.6)	27.5 (81.5)	26.9 (80.4)	26.8 (80.2)	26.9 (80.4)	26.2 (79.2)	26 (79)	26.7 (80.1)	28 (82)	28.9 (84.0)	29.4 (84.9)	29.1 (84.4)	27.5 (81.6)
Mean daily minimum °C (°F)	23.6 (74.5)	23.3 (73.9)	23.1 (73.6)	23.1 (73.6)	22.7 (72.9)	21.7 (71.1)	21 (70)	20.9 (69.6)	21.8 (71.2)	22.9 (73.2)	23.6 (74.5)	23.9 (75.0)	22.6 (72.8)
Average rainfall mm (inches)	84 (3.3)	112 (4.4)	137 (5.4)	89 (3.5)	48 (1.9)	18 (0.7)	9 (0.4)	5 (0.2)	1 (0.0)	6 (0.2)	5 (0.2)	24 (0.9)	538 (21.1)
Source: Climate-Data.org

== See also ==
- List of municipalities in Paraíba
