= Gravatá River (Paraíba) =

- Location within Brazil

Location
- Country: Brazil

Physical characteristics
- Source
  - location: Paraíba state
- Mouth
  - coordinates: 7°16′00″S 38°01′00″W

The Gravatá River is a river of Paraíba state in western Brazil.

== See also ==
- List of rivers of Paraíba
