= Taperoá River =

Location
- Country: Brazil

Physical characteristics
- Source
  - location: Paraíba state

The Taperoá River is a river of Paraíba state in northeastern Brazil. It is one of many rivers of Paraíba.

== See also ==
- List of rivers of Paraíba
