= Seridó River =

River in Brazil

Coordinates: 6.2022°S 37.1706°W

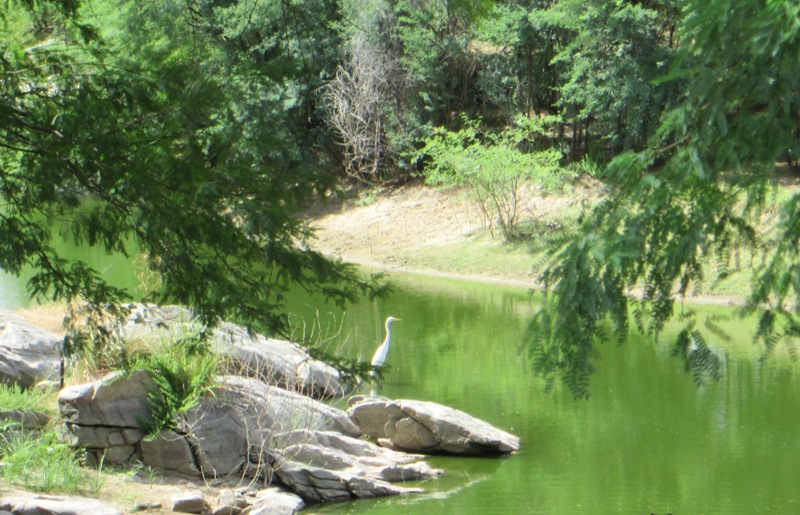
Seridó River

The Seridó River is a tributary of the Piranhas River in northeastern Brazil. The Seridó originates in the Borborema Plateau in Paraíba state, and flows northwest through Paraíba and Rio Grande do Norte states to join the Piranhas.
