= Gramame River =

Coordinates: 7°14′50″S 34°48′21″W

Location
- Country: Brazil

Physical characteristics
- Source
  - location: Paraíba state

The Gramame River is a river of Paraíba state in eastern Brazil.

== See also ==
- List of rivers of Paraíba
