= Salvador River (Paraíba) =

Location
- Country: Brazil

Physical characteristics
- Source
  - location: Paraíba state

The Salvador River is a river of Paraíba state in northeastern Brazil. It starts near Sapé and flows into Paraíba do Norte River near Santa Rita, Paraíba.

== See also ==
- List of rivers of Paraíba
