= Piranhas River =

River in northeastern Brazil

Coordinates: 5°05′30″S 36°41′25″W

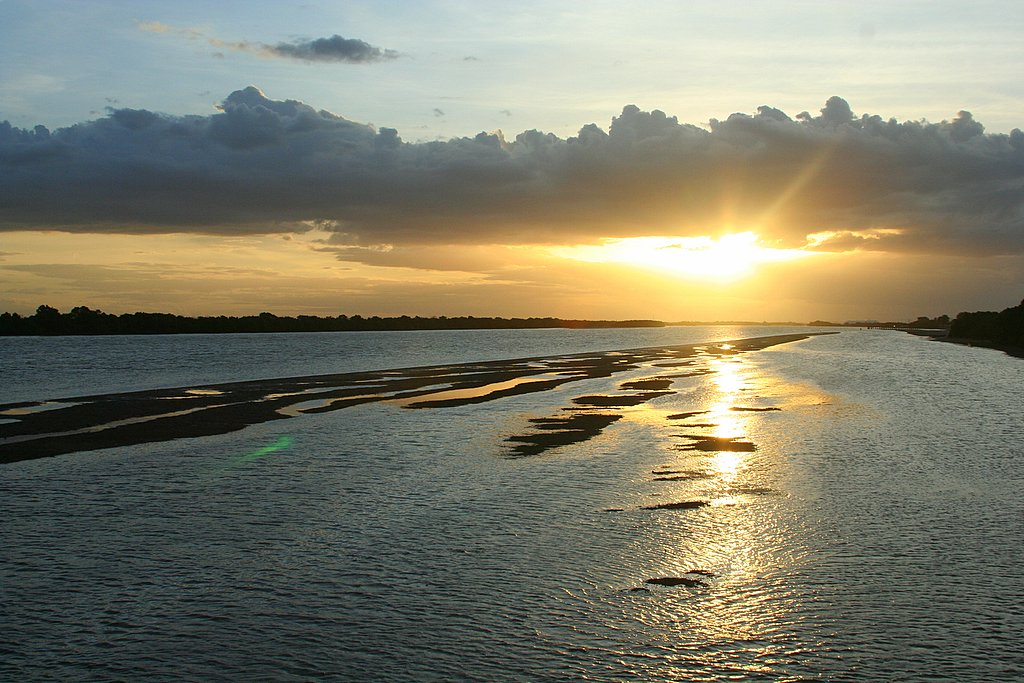
- The Piranhas River in Rio Grande do Norte state

- Location within Brazil
- Native name: Rio Piranhas-Açu (Portuguese)

Location
- Country: Brazil

Physical characteristics
- Source: Paraíba state
- Mouth: Rio Grande do Norte state
- Length: 447 km (278 mi)

The Piranhas River (Portuguese: Rio Piranhas-Açu), also known as the Açu River, is a river of northeastern Brazil. It originates in southeastern Paraíba state, near the border with Ceará, and flows north-northeast through Paraíba and Rio Grande do Norte states to empty into the Atlantic Ocean near Macau. Its chief tributary is the Seridó, which originates in the Borborema Plateau of central Paraíba and flows northwest to meet the Piranhas.
