= Aparecida, Paraíba =

Coordinates: 6°47′02″S 38°05′13″W

- Municipality
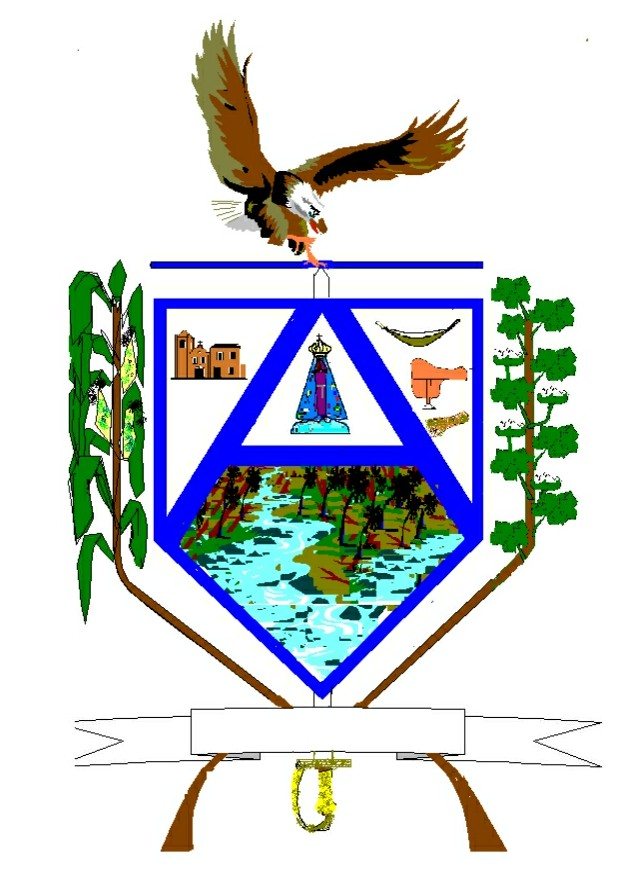
- Flag Coat of arms
- Interactive map of Aparecida, Paraíba
- Country: Brazil
- Region: Northeast
- State: Paraíba
- Mesoregion: Sertao Paraibana

Population (2020)
  - Total: 8,416
- Time zone: UTC−3 (BRT)

Aparecida, Paraíba is a municipality in the state of Paraíba in the Northeast Region of Brazil.

== See also ==
- List of municipalities in Paraíba
