= John Wittewronge =

John Wittewrong(e) may refer to:

- Sir John Wittewrong, 1st Baronet (1618–1693), English parliamentarian colonel
- Sir John Wittewrong, 2nd Baronet of the Wittewrong baronets
- Sir John Wittewronge, 3rd Baronet (1673–1722), English MP
- Sir John Wittewrong, 4th Baronet (1695–1743) of the Wittewrong baronets
- Sir William Wittewrong, 5th Baronet (1697–1761) of the Wittewrong baronets
- Sir John Wittewrong, 6th Baronet (died 1771) of the Wittewrong baronets
