= Dorian Williams =

Dorian Williams may refer to:

- Dorian Williams (equestrian) (1914–1985), British equestrian
- Dorian Williams (American football) (born 2001), American football player
