= Andrew Jackson Middle School =

Andrew Jackson Middle School may refer to:

- Andrew Jackson Middle School, Titusville, Florida - Brevard Public Schools
- Andrew Jackson Middle School, Chalmette, Louisiana - St. Bernard Parish Public Schools
- Andrew Jackson Middle School, Kershaw, South Carolina - Lancaster County School District
- Andrew Jackson Middle School, Cross Lanes, West Virginia - Kanawha County Schools
