= Lancaster High School (South Carolina) =

Location
- 617 Normandy Road; Lancaster, Lancaster County, South Carolina 29720; United States
- Coordinates: 34°43′16″N 80°46′24″W

Information
- School type: Public, high school
- Established: 1923 (103 years ago)
- School district: Lancaster County School District
- Principal: Rosalyn Mood
- Teaching staff: 82.70 (FTE)
- Grades: 9–12
- Enrollment: 1,393 (2023–2024)
- Student to teacher ratio: 16.84
- Colors: Blue and gold
- Mascot: Bruin Bear
- Rival: Jackson Volunteers; Buford Jackets; Indian Land Warriors
- Website: lhs.lancastercsd.com

Lancaster High School is located in Lancaster, South Carolina, a small city approximately 35 miles from Charlotte, North Carolina. The school serves students in grades 9–12 with a program that provides AP and honors classes, college preparatory classes, a vocational/technical program, and range of classes and services for students with special needs. It is operated by the Lancaster County School District. The new school building was built and opened in 1993.

== History ==
In the late 18th and early 19th centuries, education in the Lancaster County area depended upon itinerant teachers and private tutors. In 1825, the Franklin Academy was formed as the first unit of what was to become the Lancaster County school system. In 1923, the educational system expanded significantly with the formation of Lancaster High School and Lancaster Training School, later known as Barr Street High School.

The year 1970 marked the integration of Barr Street High School and Lancaster High School and the current campus was established in the fall of 1993.

== State championships ==
- Football: 1959
- Girls Basketball: 2015
- Baseball: 1989–1991
- Golf: 2018
- Girls Softball: 1981

== Notable alumni ==
- Charles Duke – astronaut and test pilot who, on the 1972 Apollo 16 mission became the 10th person to walk on the Moon
- Jim "Butch" Duncan – NFL player for the Baltimore Colts and New Orleans Saints, won Super Bowl V with the Colts
- C. D. Pelham – MLB pitcher for the Texas Rangers
