= Indian Land High School =

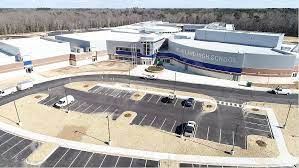
- Indian Land High School in 2023

Location
- 6100 Charlotte Hwy; Indian Land, Lancaster County, South Carolina, 29720; United States; 34.893787°N 80.797749°W

Information
- School type: High School
- Established: 1927
- School board: Lancaster County School Board
- School district: Lancaster County School District
- NCES District ID: 4502580
- Area trustee: Melvin Stroble Jr
- NCES School ID: 450258000689
- Principal: Rick Parker
- Teaching staff: 100.20 (on an FTE basis)
- Grades: 9–12
- Enrollment: 2,006 (2025–2026)
- Average class size: 27
- Student to teacher ratio: 18.17
- Colors: Royal Blue & Old Gold
- Slogan: ¨We are #The Land¨ or "On the Road to success on 521"
- Athletics conference: SCHSL
- Mascot: Warriors
- Nickname: The Land
- Rival: Fort Mill
- Website: ilhs.lancastercsd.com

Indian Land High School (ILHS) is a public high school in "the Panhandle" of Lancaster County, South Carolina, United States. It is one of four high schools in Lancaster County School District.

== Academics ==
ILHS is a comprehensive high school with a Career and Technology Education (CTE) program that provides students with an opportunity to explore career options ranging from construction to engineering. The school offers Project Lead the Way (PLTW) classes in both engineering and biomedical science. Indian Land High School is ranked 55th within South Carolina among public high schools in the state. Students have the opportunity to take Advanced Placement coursework and exams. The AP participation rate at Indian Land High School is 44%. The total minority enrollment is 33%, and 14% of students are economically disadvantaged. Indian Land High School is 1 out of 4 high schools in the Lancaster County School District. Indian Land High School is ranked #4,165 in the National Rankings. ILHS continues to participate in Winthrop University's Partnership Network. In addition, ILHS partners with the University of South Carolina Lancaster, Winthrop University, and York Technical College for dual credit opportunities.

== Athletics ==
Indian Land High School is a member of the South Carolina High School League (SCHSL). Athletic teams include swimming, volleyball, softball, football, soccer, cross country, track, tennis, golf, wrestling, basketball, baseball, cheer, and dance.

== History ==
Indian Land High School was built in 1927 where QuikTrip (1049) now stands at the corner of Collins Road and Charlotte Highway, enrolling grades 1-11 (Kindergarten and the 12th grade were not yet established in South Carolina schools). The first graduating class was four young women: Ms. Annie Mae Jackson, Ms. Azalee Morrow, Ms. Florence Rodgers, and Ms. Helen Ross, who varied in ages 17–20 at the time. In 1941, the school burned down and was subsequently rebuilt in 1947. Between 1941-1947, Indian Land students went to the Van Wyck School building in the neighboring Van Wyck community. In 1948, the 12th grade was added to the South Carolina state curriculum, which meant that the 11th grade was no longer "senior year" in 1948. However there were very few graduates from 1948 across the state of South Carolina, often due to a lack of credits to graduate in 1947 and being grandfathered in to the 11-grade curriculum. At least one student graduated from Indian Land in 1948: Mr. Raymond "Bo" Griffin. The 1977 copy of The Chief recognized 50 years of Indian Land school history. The Chief was misnumbered sometime in the early 2000s due to confusion and misunderstanding of Roman Numerals, but this mistake was caught in 2018 and adjusted for the 2019 copy. The Class of 2018 recognized past alumni and school history following the Invocation of their commencement exercises. The family of Bo Griffin (70th anniversary graduate), the Class of 1958 (60th anniversary graduates), and the Class of 1968 (50th anniversary graduates) were invited to attend this 90th anniversary celebration of Indian Land High School during the 2018 commencement.

=== The Reservation ===
The high school stadium was built across the street on Highway 521 in 1974, several years before the school was moved from across the highway. Previously the stadium and school were on the opposite side of Highway 521 but the stadium was too small for playoff games. The school district owned the property and decided to build the stadium at the location even though the school was years away from construction. Construction started smoothly on the stadium until someone noticed a problem at the site. There were 2 abandoned junk cars sitting where the actual field was to be built. The cost to remove and dispose of the junk cars was high so the Superintendent of Indian Land Schools at the time, Mr. Bennet Gunner, told the construction crew to crush them up and bury them in the field. Today buried under the 20 yard line of the field are the 2 junk cars that were too expensive to have hauled away during construction. In 2008 the stadium was named “The Reservation” on the behalf of chief Donald W. Rodgers of the Catawba Indian Nation. In 2021, with the opening of the new high school with a new stadium, The Reservation was turned over to the middle school.

=== "Indian Land School" Sign ===
A few years later the school realized the stadium needed a sign for the stadium and did not have funds to secure one. However sitting across the street at the old school (now torn down) was a sign welcoming people to Indian Land. The sign was moved across the street to what is now the middle school on River Road by the Army Corps of Engineers and erected by the school's ROTC. The concrete “Indian Land School” letters had been made by a shop class in 1960.

=== New Schools ===
The first separate Indian Land High School building (grades 9-12) opened in 1980 and served as the high school until 2007. The next high school, off of River Road, opened in 2007, and the previous building then served as the middle school. In 2021, the new high school opened, located at 6100 Charlotte Hwy. This was the first Indian Land High School building to be built on a new campus since 1980 as the previous two were on the same campus. The prior high school building (2007 building) was then converted to the new Indian Land Middle hosting grades 7-8, while the former middle school (1980 building) was converted to the Indian Land Intermediate School hosting grades 5-6.

== Notable alumni ==
- Shawn Crawford, former Olympic track athlete, gold medalist at 2004 Summer Olympics and silver medalist at 2004 and 2008 Summer Olympics
- Louise Pettus, history professor and author
- Darnell Rogers, former college basketball player
- Dorian Williams, NFL linebacker, 91st pick in 3rd round of 2023 NFL draft
