= Darrell Shropshire =

American football player (born 1983)

No. 99, 71
- Position: Defensive tackle

Personal information
- Born: March 18, 1983 (age 43); Kershaw, South Carolina, U.S.
- Listed height: 6 ft 2 in (1.88 m)
- Listed weight: 301 lb (137 kg)

Career information
- High school: Jackson (Kershaw)
- College: South Carolina
- NFL draft: 2005: 7th round, 241st overall pick

Career history
- Atlanta Falcons (2005–2006); Arizona Rattlers (2008, 2010)

Career NFL statistics
- Total tackles: 21
- Sacks: 3
- Stats at Pro Football Reference

Career AFL statistics
- Total tackles: 12
- Sacks: 5
- Pass deflections: 8

Darrell Shropshire (born March 18, 1983) is an American former professional football player who was a defensive lineman in the National Football League (NFL). He was selected in the seventh round of the 2005 NFL draft by the Atlanta Falcons. He played college football for the South Carolina Gamecocks.

== Early life ==
Shropshire attended Andrew Jackson High School, where he played defensive end, running back and tight end. He also played center on the basketball team.

== College career ==
Shropshire attended Coffeyville Community College. He was named First-team Junior College All-America and rated the #7 prospect in the SuperPrep JUCO Top 100. He was named the 2002 Defensive MVP of the Kansas Jayhawk Community College Conference. He recorded 54 tackles and six sacks his freshman season and 67 tackles and six sacks during his sophomore season before transferring to the University of South Carolina. While at Coffeyville Community College, he played for Jeff Leiker, who is a current Arizona Rattlers assistant head coach/offensive coordinator.

During his first season at South Carolina in 2003, he started all 12 games at defensive tackle. He recorded 35 total tackles (17 solo), with four tackles for loss, four quarterback hurries, and four pass break ups. He had a season-high five-tackle performance against Arkansas. As a senior in 2004, Shropshire made 28 tackles, 4.5 tackles for loss, two sacks, and a quarterback hurry. While at South Carolina, he majored in Sport and Entertainment Management.

== Professional career ==
=== National Football League ===
Shropshire was selected by the Atlanta Falcons in the seventh round (241st overall) of the 2005 NFL draft.

He played two seasons, with the Atlanta Falcons. As a rookie in 2005, he played in 10 games, recording 13 tackles (eight solo), two sacks, and two passes defended. Before being waived on September 1, 2007, he played in all four 2007 preseason games, registering four tackles and a half a sack. In 2006, Shropshire played in 13 games for the Falcons, starting one, and recorded eight tackles (six solo), one sack, and four passes defended.

=== Arena Football League ===
On December 14, 2007, Shropshire signed with the Arizona Rattlers of the Arena Football League. On March 27, he was placed on injured reserve. On April 24, he was activated from injured reserve and returned to the team. In 2008, he played in eight regular season games for the Rattlers. On August 11, 2008, he was placed on the exempted list by the Rattlers.

== See also ==
- List of Arena Football League and National Football League players
