= Buford High School =

Buford High School may refer to:

- Buford High School (Georgia), a high school in Buford, Georgia
- Buford High School (South Carolina), a high school in Lancaster, South Carolina
