= John Deacle =

English politician

John Deacle (c. 1664–1723), of Wingrove, Buckinghamshire and Aldermanbury, London, was an English politician who sat in the House of Commons from 1715 to 1722.

Deacle was the only son of Edward Deacle of Tewkesbury, Gloucestershire and his first wife. He became a member of the Drapers Company in 1696. In 1709 he succeeded to his uncle's fortune of £50,000. He was a Director of the South Sea Company from 1711 to 1712.

Deacle stood for parliament at Aylesbury at the 1713 general election but was unsuccessful. At the 1715 general election he was returned as Member of Parliament (MP) for both Aylesbury and Evesham and decided to take his seat at Evesham. Sometime after March 1715 he married Delicia Woolf, a widow and daughter of Sir Gabriel Roberts, a Turkey merchant. He was an assistant of the Drapers Company from 1720 to his death and was warden of the Company in the year 1720 to 1721. He was defeated at Evesham at the 1722 general election.

Deacle died of the palsy on 25 October 1723. There were no children from his marriage.

Parliament of Great Britain
Preceded by Simon Harcourt; John Essington	Member of Parliament for Aylesbury; 1715; With: Nathaniel Mead	Succeeded by Nathaniel Mead; Trevor Hill
Preceded by Sir Edward Goodere; John Rudge	Member of Parliament for Evesham; 1715–1722; With: John Rudge	Succeeded by Sir John Rushout; John Rudge
