= Darnell Rogers =

American basketball player (born 1997)

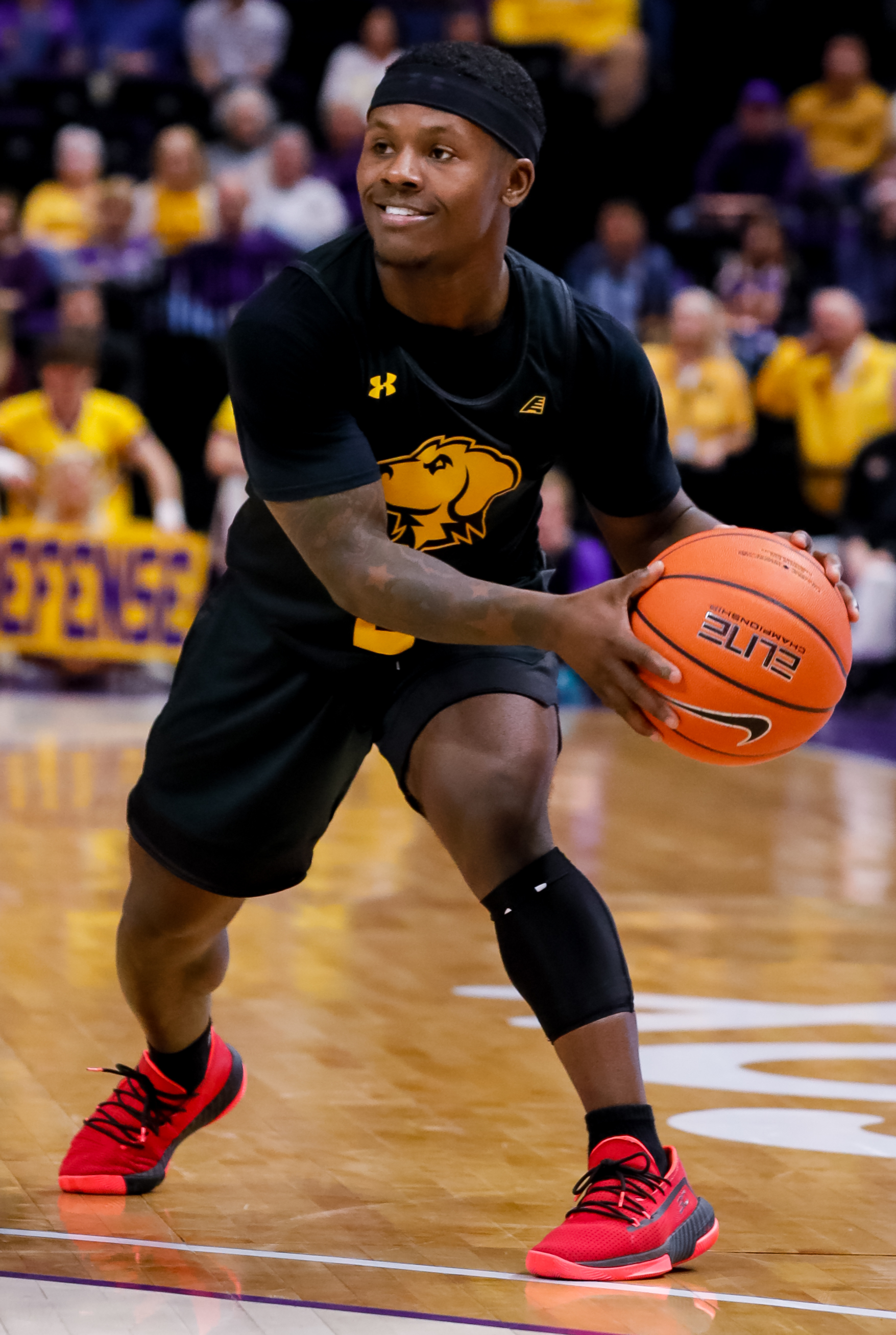
- Rogers with UMBC in 2019

Personal information
- Born: April 27, 1997 (age 29)
- Listed height: 5 ft 2 in (1.57 m)
- Listed weight: 150 lb (68 kg)

Career information
- High school: Indian Land (Indian Land, South Carolina); Shiloh (Snellville, Georgia); Believe Prep Academy (Rock Hill, South Carolina)
- College: Florida Gulf Coast (2017–2018); New Mexico JC (2018–2019); UMBC (2019–2022)
- Position: Point guard

Career highlights
- America East All-Defensive Team (2021)

Shawnta Darnell Rogers Jr. (born April 27, 1997) is an American former college basketball player who last played for the UMBC Retrievers of the America East Conference. Standing 5 feet 2 inches (1.57 m), he is believed to be the shortest person ever to play Division I men's basketball.

== Early life ==
In his childhood, Rogers lived in Baltimore, Maryland as well as in France, due to his father's basketball career. He moved to Charlotte, North Carolina at age nine, though he continued to live overseas, and did not attend an American school until he was in third grade. Rogers grew up preferring football and soccer, but chose to focus on basketball in high school.

== High school career ==
Rogers began playing varsity basketball for Indian Land High School in Indian Land, South Carolina as a seventh-grader alongside his older brother, Terrell. In his junior season, he averaged 28.2 points, 6.9 assists and 5.1 steals per game. Rogers was Indian Land's all-time leading scorer with 1,776 career points, two-time Region 4-2AA Player of the Year and led his team to its first two regional titles. As team captain, he also helped his team reach two Upper State Final Fours. After the season, Rogers drew the attention of NCAA Division I programs while playing for the CP3 All-Stars with top recruits Harry Giles and Alterique Gilbert at the Nike Elite Youth Basketball League. For his senior season, he transferred to Shiloh High School in Snellville, Georgia to play against better competition. Rogers subsequently moved to Believe Preparatory Academy in Rock Hill, South Carolina, where he averaged 23 points, seven assists and two steals per game. He recorded 18 points and five assists in a 102–56 loss to Oak Hill Academy.

=== Recruiting ===
Rogers was a consensus three-star recruit, according to major recruiting services. On October 6, 2015, he committed to play college basketball for George Washington, his father's alma mater. On May 18, 2017, Rogers switched his commitment to Florida Gulf Coast.

== College career ==
As a freshman at Florida Gulf Coast, Rogers served as a backup point guard for Brandon Goodwin. Listed at 5 ft 2 in (1.57 m), he was the shortest Division I player in the country and became the shortest scholarship Division I men's player in history (excluding unverified early-year players). Rogers mostly played on Florida Gulf Coast's scout team and averaged 6.4 minutes in 20 games. He scored a season-high 11 points in a 115–61 win over Webber International. After one season, Rogers transferred from the school. As a sophomore, he moved to New Mexico Junior College for more playing time and averaged 14 points and 3.7 assists per game. For his junior season, Rogers transferred to UMBC because of head coach Ryan Odom's success with undersized guards like K. J. Maura. In his debut, he registered a double-double of 14 points and 10 assists in a 134–46 victory over Valley Forge. He drew national attention during a game against LSU on November 19, 2019. Rogers scored a season-high 23 points two times. He suffered a season-ending leg injury early in the season and averaged 14 points, 4.3 assists and 3.4 rebounds per game in seven appearances. He was granted a medical redshirt. In his following season, Rogers averaged 9.8 points, before announcing that he would transfer from UMBC.

== Career statistics ==
Legend
GP	Games played	GS	Games started	MPG	Minutes per game
FG%	Field goal percentage	3P%	3-point field goal percentage	FT%	Free throw percentage
RPG	Rebounds per game	APG	Assists per game	SPG	Steals per game
BPG	Blocks per game	PPG	Points per game	**Bold**	Career high

=== College ===
Year	Team	GP	GS	MPG	FG%	3P%	FT%	RPG	APG	SPG	BPG	PPG
2017–18	Florida Gulf Coast	21	0	6.0	.250	.250	.500	.3	.4	.2	.0	0.9
2019–20	UMBC	7	6	**29.9**	**.446**	**.422**	.684	**3.4**	**4.3**	.7	.0	**14.0**
2020–21	UMBC	20	20	28.1	.384	.400	.800	1.5	1.8	**1.2**	.0	9.8
2021–22	UMBC	**30**	**27**	29.5	.369	.344	**.907**	1.9	3.6	1.0	.0	11.7
Career		78	53	22.8	.378	.367	.834	1.5	2.3	.8	.0	8.5

== Personal life ==
Rogers' father, Shawnta, was named Atlantic 10 Conference Player of the Year and won the Frances Pomeroy Naismith Award while playing college basketball for George Washington from 1995 to 1999. He is a member of the school's Athletics Hall of Fame. Shawnta later played professionally for about 10 years in Europe. Rogers' brother, Terrell, played college basketball for Delaware, among other programs. His cousin, Aquille Carr, was a high school basketball standout and played professionally.
