= Court Theatre (Pendley Tring) =

Theatre in the former stables of Pendley Manor in the UK

Coordinates: 51.7987°N 0.6359°W

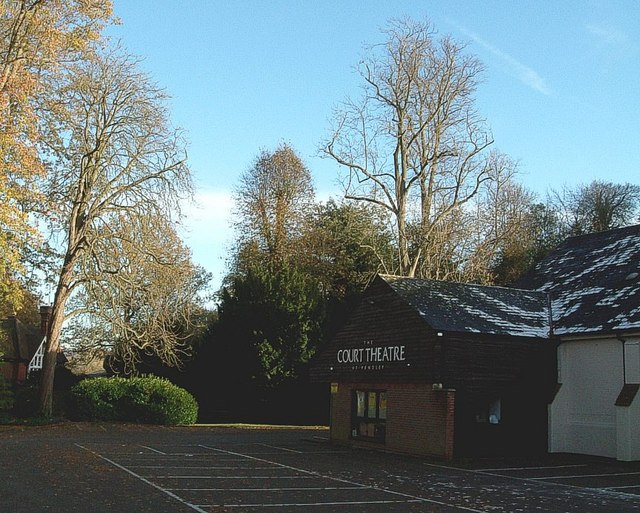

The DEMBE Theatre (formally known as The Court Theatre until June 2024) is a small theatre located in a Victorian building on the edge of the Pendley Manor estate at Tring in Hertfordshire, UK. The building was once the estate stables and was later a riding school. It was established in 1978. It presents a programme of events throughout the year, from amateur drama and musical theatre performance, to occasional professional touring band nights and comedy gigs. The DEMBE Theatre also has its own Academy that encourages young people to gain experience and enjoyment from all aspects of the production process. It is owned by David Evans MBE.
