= Buford High School (South Carolina) =

Location
- 4290 Tabernacle Road; Lancaster, South Carolina 29720; United States; 34.7583440°N 80.6238842°W

Information
- Type: Public high school
- Motto: Go Jackets!
- Established: September 7, 1925; 100 years ago
- School district: Lancaster County School District
- NCES District ID: 450258001261
- Principal: Michael Belk
- Grades: 9-12
- Enrollment: 554 (2023-2024)
- Student to teacher ratio: 12.65
- Campus type: Rural
- Colors: Maroon and Old Gold
- Nickname: Yellow Jackets
- Website: bhs.lancastercsd.com/o/bhs

Buford High School is a four-year comprehensive public high school in Lancaster, South Carolina. It is one of four high schools in the Lancaster County School District.

== History ==
Buford High School opened on September 7, 1925. The school is named after Colonel Abraham Buford of the Continental Army, and is currently located approximately one mile north of Buford's Massacre Site, where the Buford's Massacre took place in 1780 during the American Revolutionary War.

The high school was moved to a newly built facility in 1993 as part of a $30 million district-wide renovation program.

The school was one of fifteen high schools chosen nationally to take part in a nationwide study in 1952 by the USDA on the nutritional needs of students in response to changes to the Recommended Dietary Allowances (RDA) by the USDA. Under the National School Lunch Act of 1946 all students were given identical food portions regardless of factors such as age or gender, while this study was conducted to see if different portion sizes were necessary for different groups of students.

The South Carolina Department of Health and Environmental Control conducted a training scenario at Buford High School in 2004 to test the county's ability to respond to bioterrorism or pandemic threats by utilizing the Strategic National Stockpile (SNS).

== Enrollment ==
As of the 2020–21 school year, the school had an enrollment of 546 students and 38 classroom teachers, for a student–teacher ratio of 13.45. 160 of the students were eligible for free school meals, while 19 were eligible for reduced-price meals. The graduation rate for the 2020–21 school year was 87.6%, with 33.9% of students enrolled in dual enrollment courses.

== Extracurricular activities ==
The school has several clubs and organizations including JROTC and the National Honor Society.
