= William Mead (merchant) =

William Mead (1628–1713) was a London merchant, and a prominent early Quaker, connected by marriage to George Fox.

== Life ==
Mead became a wealthy linen draper of Fenchurch Street in the City of London, and member of the Company of Merchant Taylors. He was captain of a train-band, before joining the Quakers in 1670. On 14 August of that year, he was present at a crowded meeting in Gracechurch Street, at which William Penn was the preacher; both were arrested and committed to Newgate Gaol.

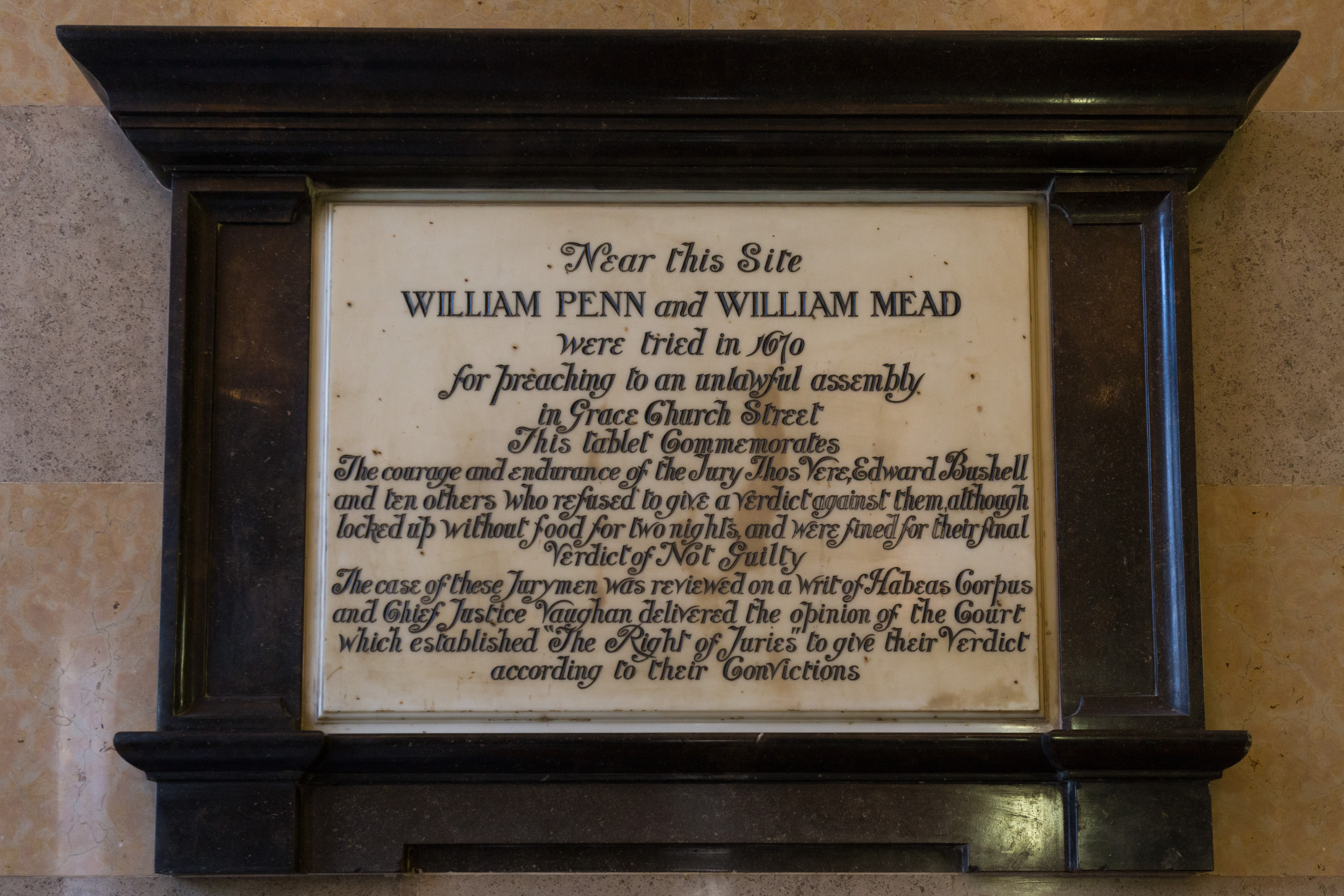
Plaque at the Old Bailey

The trial of Penn and Mead, at which they defended the right of free worship, began at the Old Bailey on 1 September 1670. They were accused of disturbing the peace by unlawfully assembling together by agreement and pleaded not guilty. The jury pronounced on 5 September that Penn was not guilty of breaking the law, and that Mead was not guilty at all; but jury and prisoners were committed to Newgate. Penn's father, Sir William Penn, was stated by Gerard Croese to have paid fines to secure their release. A detailed account of the trial, under the title The People's Ancient and Just Liberties asserted, was published (London, 1670) by Penn and Mead, and it is also related at length by Joseph Besse in his Collection of the Sufferings of the People called Quakers.

The handling of the trial gave rise to Bushel's Case. Thomas Vere, the jury foreman, paid a fine and was released. Edward Bushel(l), one of a group of four jurors who disputed their treatment, successfully applied to the Court of Common Pleas for a writ of habeas corpus, and they were released, following a ruling by Sir John Vaughan.

Mead later lived at Highgate, and entertained George Fox there in 1677. He held a leading position among the Quakers, and several times waited on the king with George Whitehead and others. He purchased about 1684 the estate of Goosehays (also Goosehayes, Gooses), in Hornchurch parish, Essex, where Fox was a visitor. He died at Goosehays 3 April 1713, aged 86, and was buried in the Friends' cemetery at Barking with a headstone.

== Works ==
Mead wrote, with Whitehead and others, several vindications of "the people called Quakers". One of these was delivered to the House of Lords, 21 February 1701.

== Family ==
Mead married and lost his first wife, Mary Lawrence, in 1679. A child, Jonathan, died in 1680.

In 1681 Mead married Sarah Fell, fourth daughter of Thomas (died 1658) and Margaret Fell; Margaret married George Fox as her second husband. Sarah Fell was a preacher, Hebrew scholar, manager of the large household at Swarthmoor, and a correspondent of William Penn and Robert Barclay. She had been sought in marriage by Richard Lower, court physician, whose brother Thomas married her sister Mary.

Sarah Fell obtained from the king in 1670 the order for the release of her mother (then Mrs. Fox) from prison, which she herself conveyed to Lancaster. She was the first clerk of the Lancashire Women's Quarterly Meeting, and before she left Swarthmoor drew up for her sisters Instructions how you may order the business in the Quarterly Women's Meeting Book. Her account-book of family expenditure and many letters were preserved in the Swarthmoor Manuscripts. She died at Goosehays, 9 June 1714, and was buried with her husband at Barking.

To Nathaniel Mead, a lawyer and politician who was knighted, his "dear and onely child", Meade left by will his estates in London, Middlesex, Kent, Essex, and Surrey. He left also legacies to the poor among Quakers and others.

== Notes ==
Attribution

This article incorporates text from a publication now in the public domain: Lee, Sidney, ed. (1894). "Mead, William". Dictionary of National Biography. Vol. 37. London: Smith, Elder & Co.
