= Battle of Waxhaws =

1780 battle of the American Revolutionary War

- Part of the American Revolutionary War
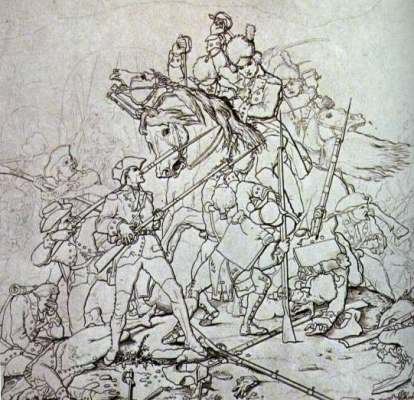
- 19th-century sketch of the battle
Date	May 29, 1780
Location	Lancaster County, South Carolina 34°44′31.03″N 80°37′32.85″W
Result	British victory: Strengthened Loyalist control in South Carolina

Belligerents
Great Britain	United States

Commanders and leaders
Banastre Tarleton	Abraham Buford

Strength
150 infantry and cavalry	380 infantry 40 cavalry

Casualties and losses
Total: 15; 5 killed; 12 wounded	Total: 319; 113 killed; 150 wounded; 53 captured

The Battle of Waxhaws (also known as the Waxhaws Massacre, Buford's Massacre, and Battle of Waxhaw Creek) was a military engagement which took place near Lancaster, South Carolina on May 29, 1780, during the American Revolutionary War. A provincial unit, the British Legion commanded by Lieutenant Colonel Banastre Tarleton, overtook a Patriot force led by Abraham Buford. Buford's men consisted of Continental Army soldiers, while Tarleton's force was mostly made up of Loyalist troops. After the two forces sighted each other, Buford rejected an offer of surrender terms, and Tarleton's cavalry charged. An unknown number of Buford's men then attempted to surrender at the same time as Tarleton's horse was shot, pinning him underneath. An unknown number of Loyalists, angered by this apparent perfidy, continued their attack, killing some Patriots until order was restored.

Of the 420 soldiers serving under Buford during the battle 104 escaped, 113 were killed, 150 were injured and 53 were captured. The British suffered 5 men killed and 12 wounded. Patriots called their lopsided defeat a "massacre". The battle became the subject of an intensive propaganda campaign by Patriots to bolster recruitment and incite resentment against the British. Patriots subsequently coined the term "Tarleton's quarter" to refer to the practice of giving no quarter during battles, though he had not ordered his men to attack the surrendering Patriots. In subsequent engagements in the Carolinas, it became rare for either side to take significant prisoners.

== Background ==
With the 1778 French intervention in the American Revolutionary War, followed by the Spanish and Dutch, the conflict became global. Facing stalemate in the north, the British embarked on a "southern strategy" to regain control over their North American colonies. The British believed they had more supporters in the South, based on close business and trading relationships, and that they might concentrate power in the South and later retake the North. They began the campaign in December 1778 with the capture of Savannah, Georgia. In 1780, General Sir Henry Clinton brought an army south and captured Charleston, South Carolina on May 12, 1780, after a siege.

== Prelude ==
Colonel Abraham Buford commanded a force of about 380 Virginian Continentals (the 3rd Virginia Detachment, composed of a mixture of new recruits and veteran soldiers) and an artillery detachment with two six-pounders). Most of his men had little battle experience, although Buford had experienced officers under his command. Because of delays in outfitting his command, Buford had been unable to reach Charleston and participate in its defense. Charleston's commander, General Benjamin Lincoln, had ordered him to take a defensive position near Lenud's Ferry on the Santee River outside the city, but Lincoln surrendered around the time Buford reached this position. Buford was eventually joined by about 40 Virginia 1st and 3rd Light Dragoons who had escaped the siege or during battles outside the city, and by Richard Caswell's North Carolina militia. Receiving news of the surrender, Buford was ordered by General Isaac Huger to return to Hillsborough, North Carolina. He turned his column around and headed north. At Camden, Buford and Caswell parted ways, with Buford marching north into the Waxhaws region. Buford was accompanied for a time by South Carolina Governor John Rutledge, who had been actively recruiting militia in the backcountry. When Buford stopped to rest his troops at Waxhaw Creek, Rutledge rode ahead toward Charlotte, North Carolina.

General Clinton learned of Huger's and Rutledge's forces and on May 15 ordered Lord Cornwallis to bring the South Carolina and Georgia backcountry under British control. His army moving too slowly to keep up with Buford, Cornwallis on May 27 sent Lieutenant Colonel Banastre Tarleton in pursuit with a force of 170 light dragoons (composed of British Legion, a primarily Loyalist provincial regiment, and 17th Light Dragoons), 100 mounted British Legion infantry, and a three-pounder cannon. Tarleton reached Camden late on May 28 and set off in pursuit of Buford early on May 29. By that afternoon, his advance force of 60 dragoons, 60 mounted infantry, and an additional flanking force of 30 British Legion dragoons and some infantry, had reached Buford. Warned of Tarleton's pursuit, Buford had begun moving north.

== Battle ==
Tarleton sent Captain David Kinlock forward to the rebel column, carrying a white flag, to demand Buford's surrender. Upon his arrival, Buford halted his march and formed a battle line while the parley took place. Tarleton greatly exaggerated the size of his force in his message—claiming he had 700 men—hoping to sway Buford's decision. The note also said, "Resistance being vain, to prevent the effusion of human blood, I make offers which can never be repeated", indicating that Tarleton would ask only once for Buford to surrender. Buford refused to surrender, responding: "I reject your proposals, and shall defend myself to the last extremity." Buford reformed his troops into a column and continued the northward march, with his baggage train near the front of the column.

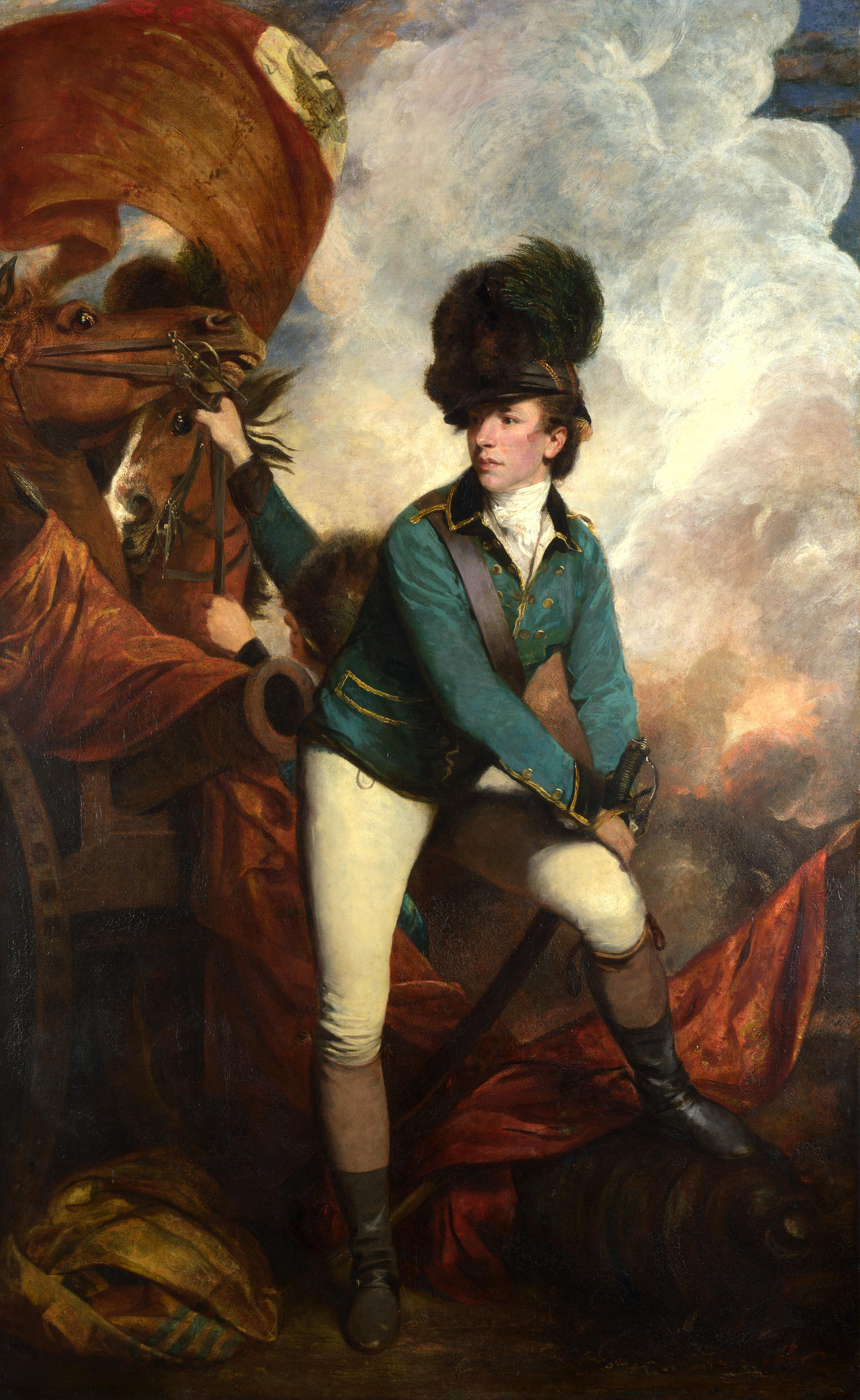
Portrait of Banastre Tarleton by Joshua Reynolds

Around 3:00 pm the leading edge of Tarleton's force caught up with Buford's rear guard. Forty years after the event, Robert Brownfield, a Patriot surgeon’s mate at the time, said the five dragoons of the rear guard were captured, and their leader, Captain Pearson, was "inhumanely mangled" by saber cuts, some inflicted after he had fallen. Buford stopped the column (except for the artillery and the baggage, which he ordered to continue on) and formed a single battle line near some open woods. Tarleton, some of whose horses were so tired from the pursuit that he was unable to bring his field artillery into range, established a command post on a nearby hill, and organized his forces for the attack. According to his account of the battle, he arrayed 60 British Legion dragoons and a like number of infantry on the right, the dragoons of the 17th along with some additional British Legion dragoons in the center, and he personally took command of the left, commanding "thirty chosen horse and some infantry". Stragglers were to form a reserve corps atop the hill.

What happened next is the subject of much debate; there are significant inconsistencies in the primary accounts. Tarleton's line charged, and Buford waited until the enemy was within 10 yards (9 m) before giving the order to fire. This was a tactical mistake on Buford's part, for it enabled Tarleton's formations to hold, while giving Buford's men time to fire only a single volley before Tarleton's force attacked their line. Traditional American histories say that as Tarleton's cavalry tore Buford's line to pieces, and many of the Patriots began laying down their arms and offering to surrender. According to Patriot accounts, Buford, realizing the cause was lost, dispatched a white flag—indicating a desire to stop fighting and negotiate surrender—toward Tarleton. Patriot accounts differ on who carried the white flag, when it was sent, and how its messenger was treated, but the accounts agree that the flag was effectively refused. However, Tarleton was trapped beneath his dead horse, following the mount being shot from under him during the battle. So, if sent, a flag was not received. None of the British accounts of the battle mention a flag. Fighting continued on both sides.

The Moravians in Salem recorded that three soldiers who had been at the Waxhaws arrived on June 8th. They related that while men were laying down their arms in surrender, one of the men picked his gun back up and shot at Tarleton, killing his horse. They also related that the Continental regulars were held prisoners, but the militia were all released and sent home.

Buford and some of his cavalry were able to escape the battlefield. According to Tarleton's report of the battle, the Patriot casualties were 113 men killed, 147 wounded and released on parole, and 2 six pounders and 26 wagons captured. The British losses were 5 killed, 12 wounded, with 11 horses killed and 19 horses wounded. Tarleton's men also captured the American baggage train and artillery.

Historians in the 19th century blamed Tarleton for the massacre, but most contemporary references do not describe it as such. Tarleton, in a version published in 1787, said that the battle was a "slaughter"; he said that his horse had been shot from under him during the initial charge and his men, thinking him dead, engaged in "a vindictive asperity not easily restrained". William Moultrie noted that the lopsided casualty count was not unusual for similar battles in which one side gained a decided advantage early in a battle. Historian Jim Piecuch argues that the battle was no more a massacre than similar events led by Patriot commanders. David Wilson, on the other hand, holds Tarleton responsible for the slaughter. He notes that it represented a loss of discipline, something for which Tarleton was accountable. He had already been reprimanded for transgressions by his men at the Battle of Monck's Corner in April. Charles Stedman, a aide-de-camp to Cornwallis, wrote regarding the battle at Waxhaws that "the virtue of humanity was totally forgot."

== Aftermath ==
After the battle, the wounded were treated at nearby churches by the congregants. Tarleton reported that after the battle ended, the wounded of both sides were treated "with equal humanity" and that the British provided "every possible convenience". Due to the large number of wounded, people from all over the countryside came to assist in their care. When they learned what had happened from the wounded they were treating, albeit one-sidedly, a belief in an apparent violation of quarter on Tarleton's part spread rapidly through the region.

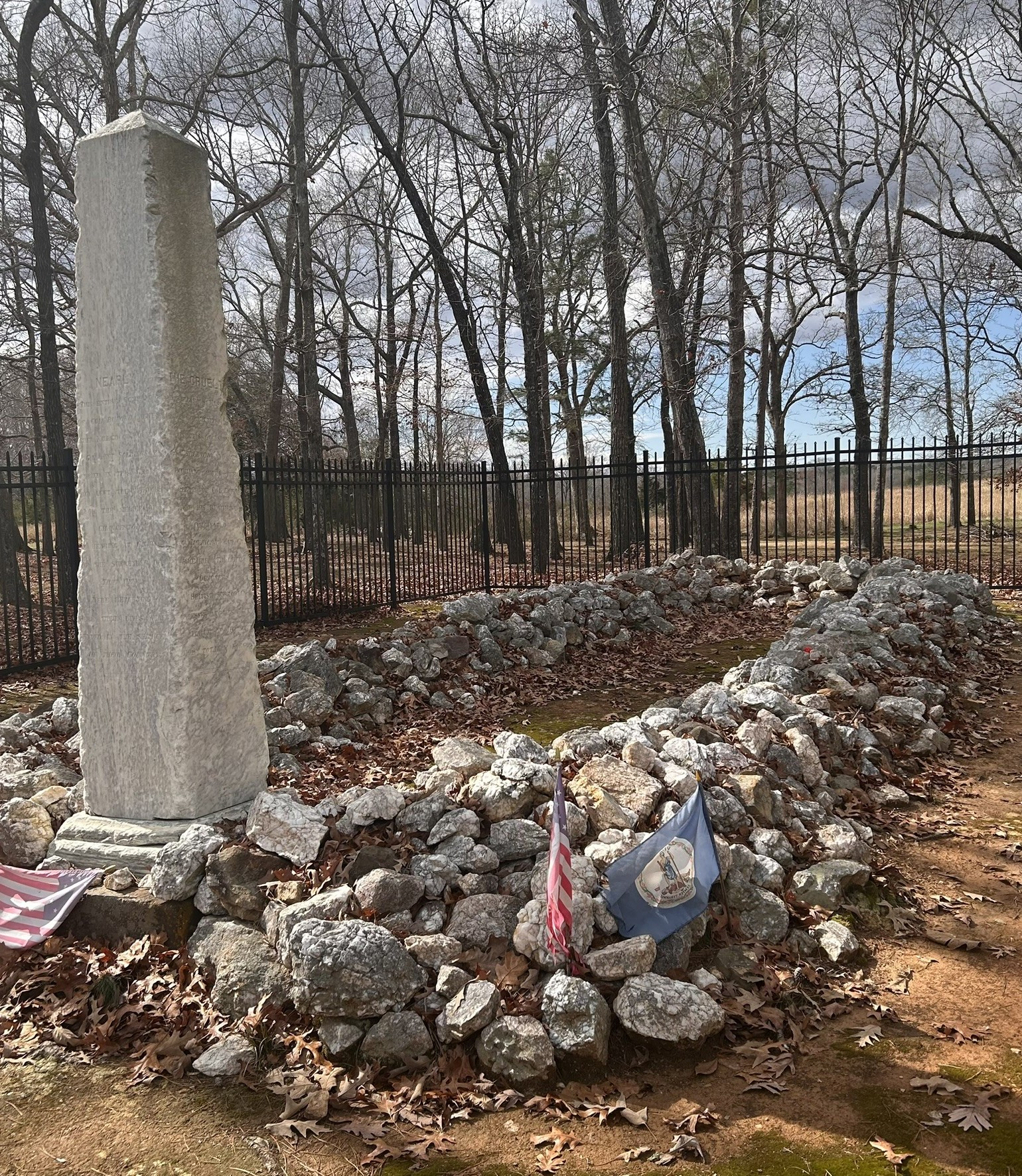
Monument and mass grave at the battle site

The battle consolidated British control over South Carolina, and Patriot sentiment was at a low ebb. General Clinton, among other acts before he left Charleston for New York, revoked the parole of surrendered Patriots. This affront and the reports of this battle decisively changed the direction of the war in the South. Many who might have stayed neutral flocked to the Patriots, and "Tarleton's Quarter!" and "Remember Buford" became rallying cries for the Whigs. News of the massacre directly inspired the creation of volunteer militia forces among the Overmountain Men (from the Wataugan settlements at and near Sycamore Shoals). These militia participated in actions against Loyalist forces at both the Battle of Musgrove Mill on August 18, 1780, and in the decisive defeat of a Loyalist army led by Major Patrick Ferguson on October 7, 1780, at Kings Mountain.

== Legacy ==
The community in which the battlefield is located is now called Buford, and the nearby high school is named Buford High School, after Colonel Buford. The battlefield is owned by Lancaster County and is preserved as a local park. In 1990 it was listed on the National Register of Historic Places as Buford's Massacre Site. The American Battlefield Trust and its partners have acquired and preserved 51 acres (0.21 km^{2}) of the battlefield surrounding the local park as of 2023.

During the battle, the Loyalist forces captured three colours belonging to the Patriots. The colours were retained by Tarleton's descendants until being sold at auction in 2006 for more than US$5,000,000 ($7.99 million in 2025). Only around 30 flags from the Revolutionary War are known to exist today.
