= Nathaniel Mead =

English lawyer and politician

Sir Nathaniel Mead (died 1760), of Goosehays, near Romford, Essex, was an English lawyer and politician who sat in the House of Commons from 1715 to 1722.

Mead was the son of William Mead of Goosehays. He was admitted at Middle Temple in 1700 and was called to the bar in 1704. His first wife's identity is unrecorded, but his second wife was Martha Scawen, daughter of Sir Thomas Scawen. He became Serjeant-at-law in January 1715 and was knighted on 17 February 1715. By this time he was also under-steward of Havering-atte-Bower.

Mead stood unsuccessfully for Aylesbury at the 1713 general election. He was elected Member of Parliament (MP) for Aylesbury at the 1715 general election. He did not stand in 1722.

Mead died on 15 April 1760. He had two sons from his first marriage and a son and a daughter from the second.

Parliament of Great Britain
Preceded by Simon Harcourt; John Essington	Member of Parliament for Aylesbury; January 1715 – 1722; With: John Deacle to April 1715; Trevor Hill from April 1715	Succeeded by John Guise; Richard Abell
