= Pendley Open Air Shakespeare Festival =

Theatre festival in Tring, Hertfordshire

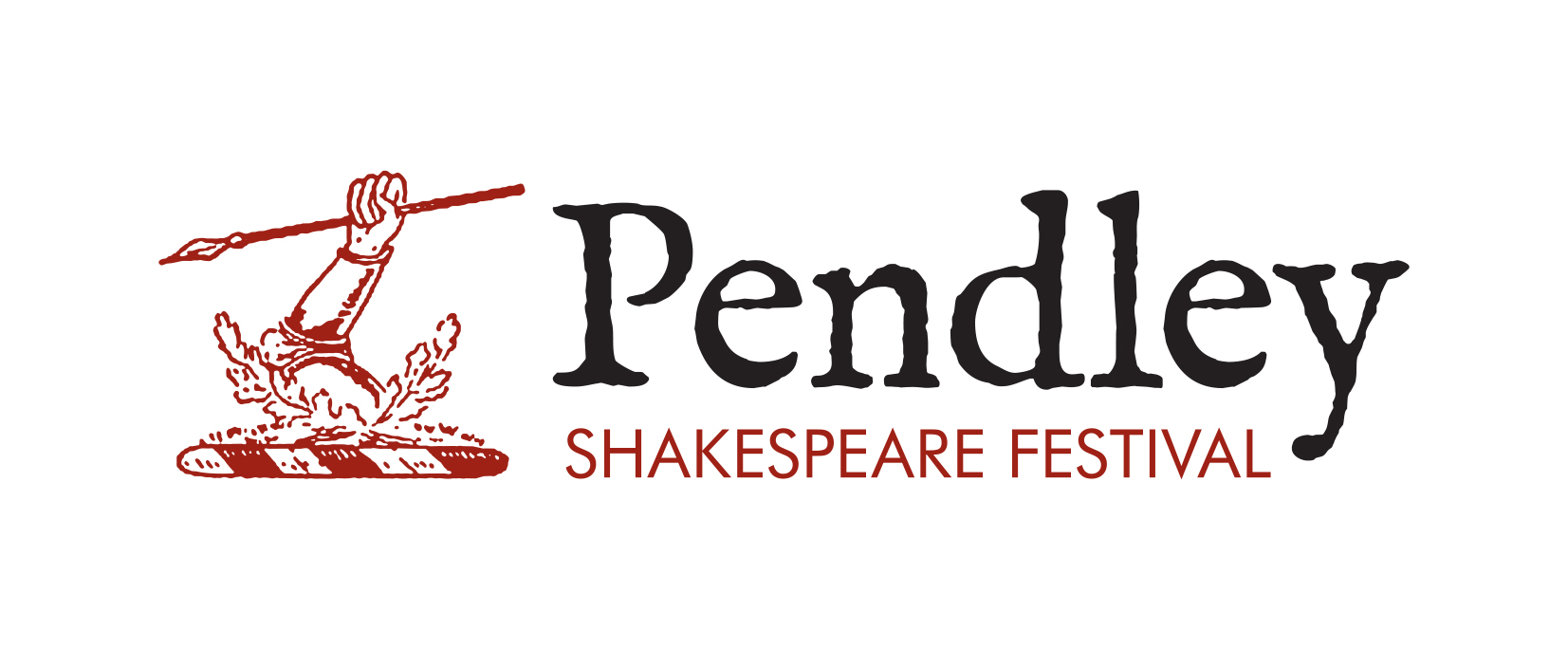
- Interactive map of Pendley Open Air Shakespeare Festival
- Address: Cow Lane, Tring, Herts. HP23 5QY; UK
- Coordinates: 51.7965°N 0.6350°W
- Owner: Craydawn Pendley Manor
- Capacity: Glade Stage circa 1,200 seats Garden Stage 650 seats
- Type: Open-Air
- Designation: Pendley Manor Grade II
- Production: Festival

Construction
- Opened: 1949
- Architect: Pendley Manor John Lion

Website
- www.pendleyshakespearefestival.co.uk

The Pendley Open Air Shakespeare Festival is, as the name implies, an annual festival dedicated to the plays of William Shakespeare. It takes place at the beginning of August at Pendley Manor, a hotel in Tring, Hertfordshire.

== History ==
The first official festival took place in 1949 with a production of King Henry VIII, although there had been less formal presentations in the two preceding years. In 1954, the festival took its current format, when a second production was added.

The credit for the festival's initiation must go to Dorian Williams. Williams was a popular sports commentator for the BBC, especially expert in Show-Jumping. Pendley Manor was his family home (it only became a hotel in later years) and he helped oversee the development of part of the house into an adult education centre. The drama group that met in the centre performed the first, non-official festival in 1947 and Williams himself often acted and directed in the early festivals.

=== Past productions ===
Dorian Williams as Bolingbroke in Richard II.

Programme Cover from the 2007 Festival

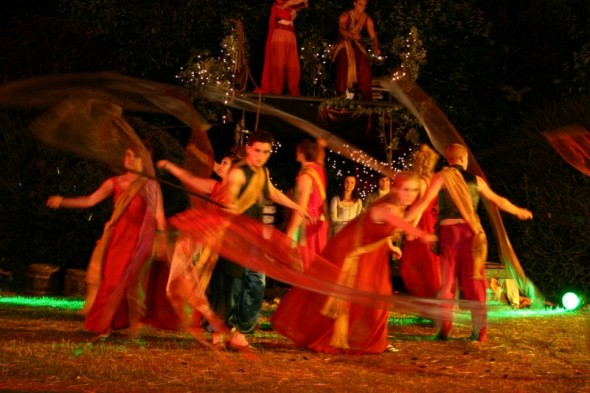
The Tempest, directed by Stephen Artus at the 2007 Festival

1947 Scenes from A Midsummer Night's Dream & King Richard II
1948 "If music be the food of love..." Famous scenes
1949 King Henry VIII. The first Festival
1950 Falstaff ...combining the many scenes from Henry IV, Parts 1 and 2
1951 Twelfth Night
1952 The Tempest
1953 Romeo and Juliet
1954 Julius Caesar & A Midsummer Night's Dream
1955 Macbeth & As You Like It
1956 Henry V & The Merry Wives of Windsor
1957 King John & Twelfth Night
1958 King Lear & A Midsummer Night's Dream
1959 Henry VIII & The Merchant of Venice
1960 Richard II & The Taming of the Shrew
1961 As You Like It & The Winter's Tale
1962 Much Ado About Nothing & Macbeth
1963 Othello & The Merry Wives of Windsor
1964 Romeo and Juliet & Twelfth Night
1965 Love's Labour's Lost & The Tempest
1966 King Lear & A Midsummer Night's Dream
1967 Anthony and Cleopatra & The Taming of the Shrew
1968 Richard III & The Comedy of Errors
1969 Much Ado About Nothing & The Winter's Tale
1970 Twelfth Night & The Merchant of Venice
1971 As You Like It & Richard II
1972 Love's Labour's Lost & The Merry Wives of Windsor
1973 Hamlet & A Midsummer Night's Dream
1974 Romeo and Juliet & The Comedy of Errors
1975 The Tempest & King Henry IV; part II
1976 Twelfth Night & Henry V
1977 The Taming of the Shrew & Julius Caesar
1978 The Winter's Tale & As You Like It
1979 Much Ado About Nothing & Macbeth
1980 Love's Labour's Lost & The Merry Wives of Windsor
1981 The Merchant of Venice & Two Gentlemen of Verona
1982 A Midsummer Night's Dream & King Henry IV; part I
1983 Twelfth Night & Romeo and Juliet
1984 Much Ado About Nothing & The Tempest
1985 Richard III & The Taming of the Shrew
1986 As You Like It & King Lear
1987 Macbeth & A Midsummer Night's Dream
1988 No Festival
1989 The Merchant of Venice
1990 The Merry Wives of Windsor
1991 Romeo and Juliet & The Comedy of Errors
1992 Henry VIII & A Midsummer Night's Dream
1993 The Tempest & Twelfth Night
1994 As You Like It & Henry V
1995 Much Ado About Nothing & Richard III
1996 Two Gentlemen of Verona & The Merchant of Venice
1997 The Taming of the Shrew & Macbeth
1998 Love's Labour's Lost & Twelfth Night
1999 Romeo and Juliet & A Midsummer Night's Dream
2000 The Comedy of Errors & The Tempest
2001 Much Ado About Nothing & Henry V
2002 The Taming of the Shrew & Macbeth
2003 Sir John Falstaff and the Merry Wives & The Winter's Tale
2004 A Midsummer Night's Dream & Twelfth Night
2005 Much Ado About Nothing & Romeo and Juliet
2006 The Comedy of Errors & King Lear
2007 As You Like It & The Tempest
2008 Twelfth Night & The Merchant of Venice
2009 A Midsummer Night's Dream & Macbeth
2010 The Taming of the Shrew & Richard III
2011 The Winter's Tale & The Merry Wives of Windsor
2012 Romeo and Juliet & Much Ado About Nothing
2013 As You Like It & Love's Labour's Lost
2014 The Comedy of Errors & Hamlet
2015 Twelfth Night & Henry V
2016 A Midsummer Night's Dream & The Tempest
2017 Much Ado About Nothing & Richard III
2018 Romeo and Juliet & The Taming Of The Shrew
2019 The Merry Wives of Windsor & Macbeth
2020 Cancelled because of the COVID-19 pandemic; The Comedy of Errors & Coriolanus had been planned
2021-2025 No Festival

=== Alumni ===
A new company of players is formed each year. Several members return year after year, others only stay for one season. Some are aspiring drama school students, and go on to have successful careers in the industry. These include:

- Lynda Bellingham
- Stephen Campbell Moore
- Silas Carson
- Raza Jaffrey
- Caroline Quentin
- Hermione Norris
- Luke Newberry

== Stages ==
=== The Glade Stage ===
The majority of Productions prior to 2001 were given on what became known as The Glade Stage, a natural raised stage in the grounds of the Manor, west-facing, flanked by two magnificent 100 ft high Canadian Firs. Dramatic entrances made on horse back down the glade were common.

=== The Formal Stage ===
A second natural raised stage, facing south was used in 1962, 1963, 1964, 1968, 1970, 1980 and 1981. This stage had a backdrop of Yew hedges, characters would make their entrances and exits through gaps between the hedges.

=== Rose Garden ===
In 1989 during the conversion of the Manor House into a Hotel, a production of The Merchant of Venice was presented raised above the Rose Garden, on the south side of the Manor, with the Manor itself as a backdrop.

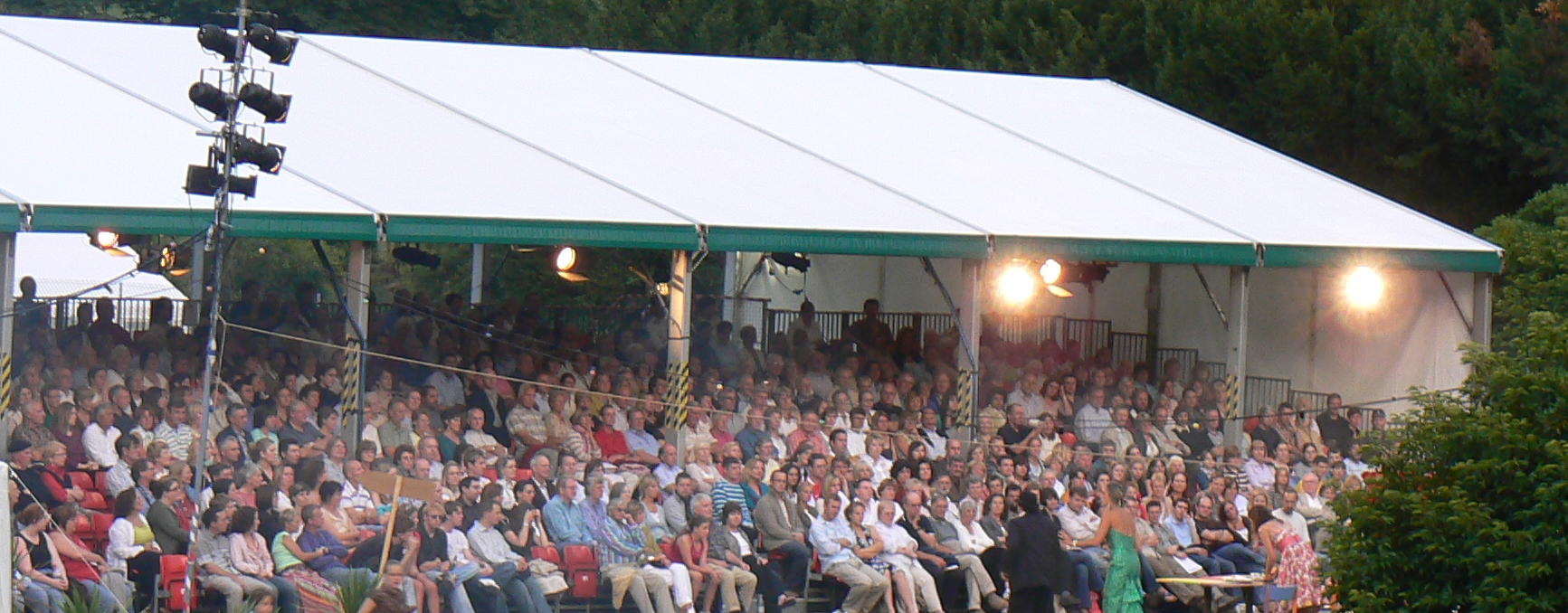
The Garden Stage and seating stand, 2006

=== The Williams Stage ===
In 2001, a swimming pool and leisure centre were added to the Hotel. The electricity that this facility drew from the substation, compromised the power available for the Festival. This compromise, alongside increased demand for the Hotel's wedding facilities located within earshot of the Glade Stage, meant the Festival had to be both downsized in terms of its power requirements, and also relocated away from the wedding facilities. The Garden Stage sits in front of a leafy bank, alongside the Rose Garden, and the seating stand is placed on the tennis courts. Although this smaller, more intimate stage, may lack some of the grandeur of the larger stages, many believe it doesn't lack any of the magic.

== Current status ==
The festival has continued to grow in popularity, maintaining its reputation as one of the most significant amateur Shakespeare festivals in England. The festival saw record attendances in 2004 when it staged A Midsummer Night's Dream and Twelfth Night, two of the most popular plays in the Shakespeare canon.

The productions for the 66th annual festival in August 2015 were Twelfth Night and Henry V.

The current artistic director of the festival is Sarah Branston, director of drama at Reigate Grammar School. Her productions include Twelfth Night in 1998, Romeo and Juliet in 1999, Henry V in 2001, The Winter's Tale in 2003, A Midsummer Night's Dream in 2004, King Lear in 2006, The Merchant of Venice in 2008, Richard III in 2010, Much Ado About Nothing in 2012 and Hamlet in 2014.
