= Louise Pettus =

American historian

Mildred Louise Pettus (February 1, 1926 – August 15, 2021) was an American history professor and author.

Pettus graduated from Winthrop College and the University of South Carolina and became an educator. She returned to her alma mater as a professor at Winthrop University in Rock Hill, South Carolina. It has archives named for her, the Louise Pettus Archives and Special Collections. It also holds a collection of her papers. She retired in 1989. She wrote nine books and wrote for newspapers and history publications. She edited The Quarterly, York County Genealogical Society's publications from 1989-2005 and wrote for Winthrop College's former publication South Carolina Story.

Her family owned the Pettus Gin Company, a cotton gin business she helped at growing up, in Indian Land, South Carolina and she was born to Calvin Hall Pettus and Bessie Kathryn Rodgers Pettus. She graduated from Indian Land High School and received degrees from Winthrop College and the University of South Carolina.

Pettus had a sister Peggy and two brothers. She donated issues of The Carolina Genealogist to Winthrop in 1990. She also donated papers related to her research into William Lyle Roddey and his family.

Pettus wrote about family histories.

October 27, 1985, she wrote a letter about her life. She wrote that she was a Democrat who admired Franklin D. Roosevelt and Jimmy Carter while detesting Ronald Reagan who she considered "a cheap cowboy actor who cares little for the mass of Americans but uses words to manipulate." She wrote about Tega Cay in the South Carolina Encyclopedia. Historian and author Terry L. Norton thanked her for her guidance in the preface to a book.

== Writings ==
- The Waxhaws (1993), assisted by Nancy Crockett
- The Springs Story: Our First Hundred Years Fort Mill, South Carolina Spring Industries (1987) assisted by Mildred Gwin Andrews
- Leasing Away a Nation: The Legacy of Catawba Indian Land Leases Palmetto Conservation Foundation (2005)
- The Catawba River Companion, co-author
- The Palmetto State: Stories from the Making of South Carolina with Ron Chepesiuk
- Lancaster County: A pictorial History by Louise Pettus and Martha Bishop
- The White Homestead
- A Roddey Family
- The Nation Ford Road
- Belair United Methodist Church – The First One Hundred Years

=== Articles ===
- "First Woman Senator Perplexed the Men", with Ron Chepesiuk
- "History of the First Hill Baptist Church" May 3, 1992 York Observer
- "Samuel B. Hall & Maj. Lewis Merrill" The Quarterly, Rock Hill Genealogical and Historical Society (1997)

== See also ==
- National Register of Historic Places listings in York County, South Carolina
- Museum of York County
