= Pendley Manor =

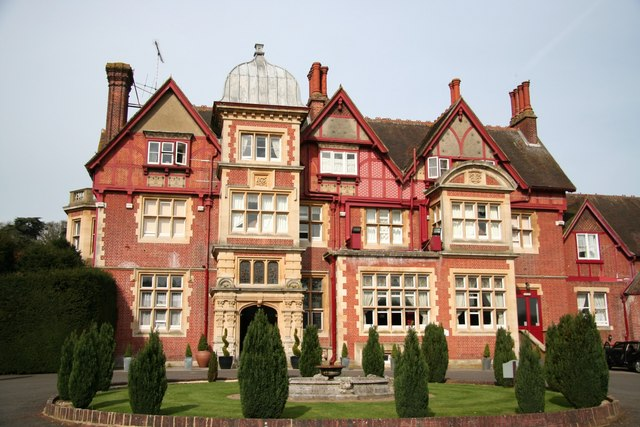
- The main frontage of Pendley Manor

- Location within Hertfordshire

General information
- Status: Converted to a hotel
- Type: English country house
- Architectural style: Victorian Neo-Jacobean style
- Location: Cow Lane, Tring HP23 5QY, Tring, Hertfordshire, United Kingdom
- Coordinates: 51°47.8′N 0°38.08′W
- Completed: 1874

Design and construction
- Designations: Grade II listed building

Website
- www.pendley-manor.co.uk

Pendley Manor is a hotel, conference and function centre near Tring, Hertfordshire, UK. It is a historic country house and is Grade II listed as an important example of Victorian architecture.

The Pendley Manor Hotel is currently operated by a company called Craydawn Pendley Manor Limited.

== History ==
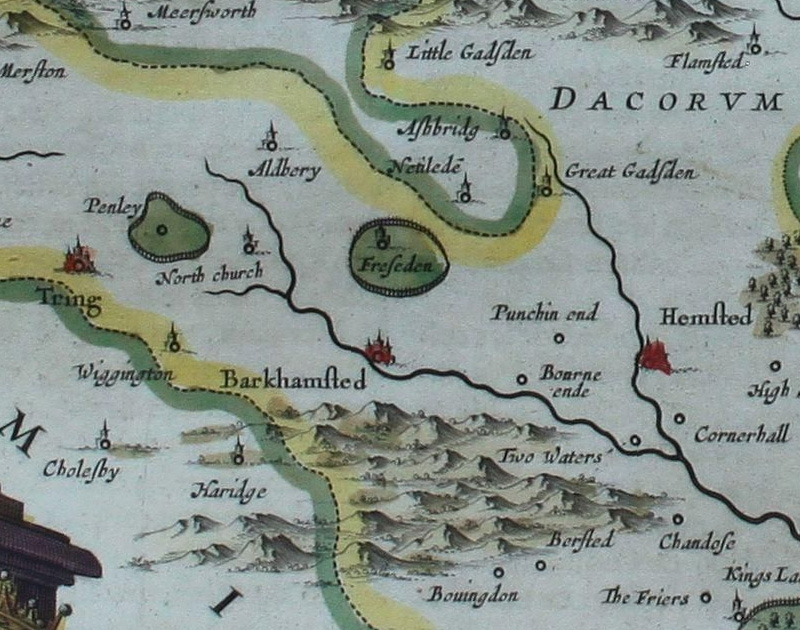
1659 map of Hertfordshire showing the enclosed estate of Penley [sic]

A village of Pendley (or Penley, Pendele, or Pentlai) is recorded from the 4th century AD, held in the honour of Berkhampstead. The manor of Pendley pre-dates the Norman Conquest of 1066, after which it was confiscated by William the Conqueror and passed to his brother-in-law, Robert, Count of Mortain, who became one of the greatest landholders in the newly conquered Kingdom of England. A later owner was John de Angle, an early Member of Parliament.

=== The Whittinghams and the Verneys ===
By the 15th century, Pendley was a small town. In 1440 the county sheriff of Essex and Hertfordshire Sir Robert Whittingham (or Whytingham) and his wife Agnes received a grant of free warren from King Henry VI at Pendley manor; Sir Robert enclosed 200 acres and tore down the buildings on the land, returning the estate to pasture. He built a manor house at the western end of the now-demolished town as a double cloistered courtyard similar to those found at Herstmonceux Castle and Eton College. Whittingham subsequently obtained a papal licence to build a chapel at the manor house and engage a priest to hold services there when the roads became impassable in winter.

On the accession of King Edward IV, Whittingham's fortunes changed; the king attainded Whittingham for his loyalty to Henry and in 1461 he granted Pendley manor to George Neville, Bishop of Exeter. Around 1472, Whittingham's daughter Margaret married John Verney, son of a Lord Mayor of London Sir Ralph de Verney. Because of the king's favour for Verney, he lifted the attainder on Whittingham and Pendley Manor land passed to the Verney family.

=== The Andersons and the Harcourts ===
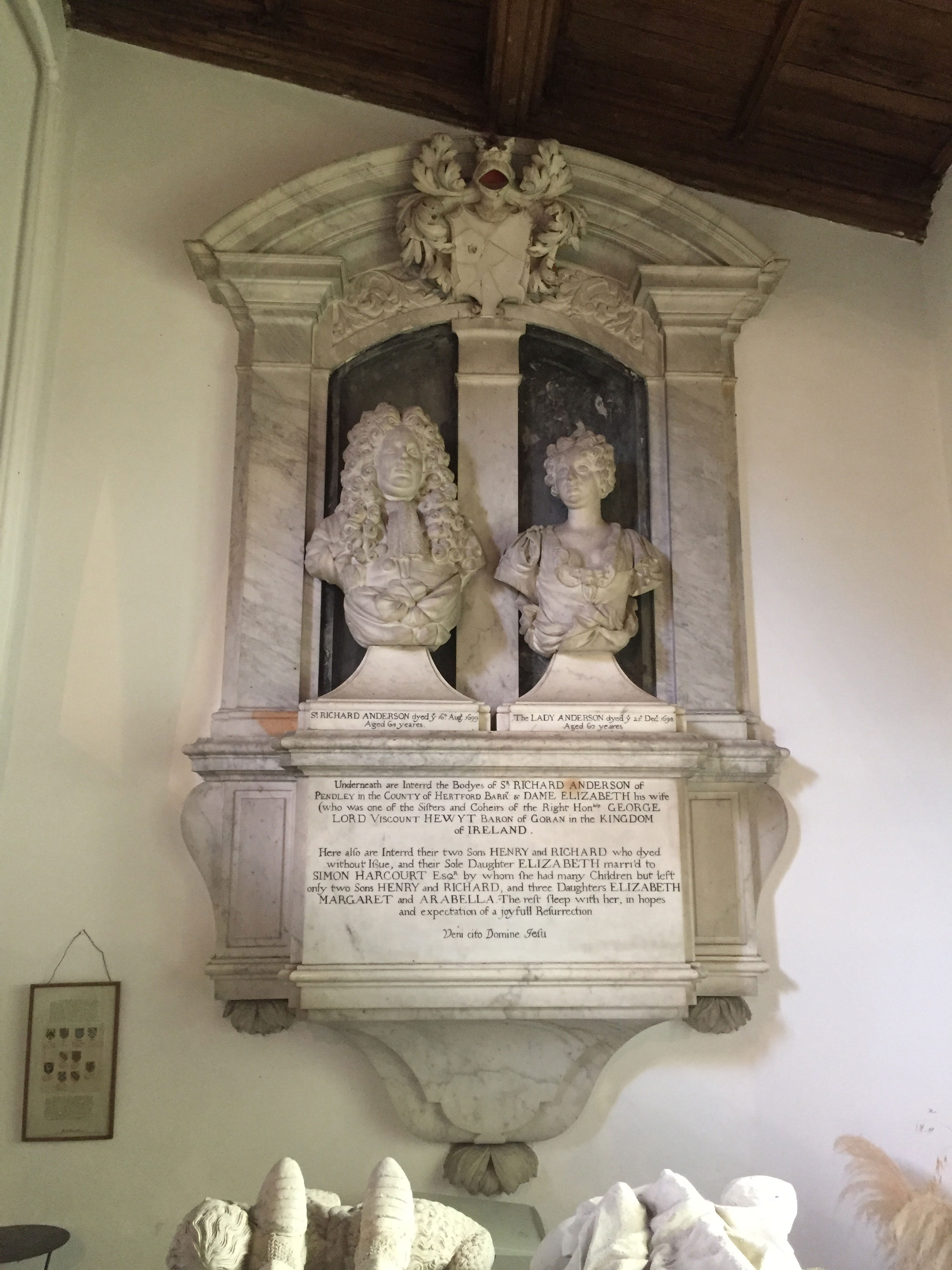
The Anderson tomb in the Pendley Chapel, St. John the Baptist, Aldbury

The Verney family lived at the medieval manor for the next 150 years. The Anderson family then occupied it for four generations from 1606-7.

In 1630, a friend of Sir Richard Anderson, the Rev. Lawrence Washington, visited Pendley Manor. During his stay there he became acquainted with Amphyllis Twigden and began a love affair with her. As a fellow of Brasenose College, Oxford, Washington was prohibited from marrying, and in 1631 Amphyllis bore him a son out of wedlock. Eventually Archbishop William Laud granted the couple a licence to marry, and Lawrence and Amphyllis were married in Tring in late 1632. Their son, John Washington, emigrated to Virginia in 1657. The Washington family became established in the new colony, and over a century later in 1789, John's great-grandson, George Washington, became the first President of the United States of America.

In 1677, Anderson's daughter Elizabeth married the politician Simon Harcourt. Sir Richard Anderson died in 1699, and he was buried in the Pendley Chapel in the Church of St John the Baptist in the neighbouring village of Aldbury, alongside his wife Dame Elizabeth Anderson and their other children. As the young Elizabeth was the Anderson family's only surviving child, Pendley Manor passed through marriage to the Harcourt family.

In the 1830s, at the height of the Industrial Revolution, railway engineer Robert Stephenson began construction on the new London and Birmingham Railway. The project was delayed by opposition from local landowners (among them Lord Brownlow and Sir Astley Cooper); after a change in the planned route, parliamentary approval was granted, and the railway line was built along a route parallel to the Grand Junction Canal, some distance to the east of Tring — but too close to Pendley Manor to suit the occupant, Sir William Harcourt. He regarded the incursion of the iron horse into the locality as an intolerable nuisance and abandoned Pendley Manor. The ancient medieval manor buildings burnt down soon after in 1835.

=== The new manor ===
A Local landowner and mill owner, Joseph Grout Williams commissioned architect Walter F K Ryan to build a new Tudor style Manor, the present building, in 1872. He and his descendants then occupied the Victorian Manor from 1875 until 1983.

The last private owner was BBC show jumping commentator Dorian Williams, who developed it as a center for adult education and the arts after the second World War. He inaugurated the Pendley Open Air Shakespeare Festival in 1949 in the hotel grounds which continues to run to the present day. The grounds have two landscaped open-air theatres. The indoor Court Theatre has permanently occupied the former stables to the estate since 1978 and presents a full programme of drama and musical performance.

The house was sold to a property company in 1983 and then in 1989 to a hotel company which invested in the building and re-opened it as a country house hotel in 1991. There have since been several extensions built to house additional rooms, a spa and gymnasium and a banqueting / conference suite.

== Architecture ==
The present building was erected c.1874 near the site of the old manor house. It was designed in a neo-Jacobean style by the architect Walter F K Ryan and built in red brick with Bath stone dressings. Architectural features include a half-timbered jettied top floor; tall decorated brick chimney pots; a square tower with an ogee-shaped lead roof; ornamental herringbone brickwork, carved Jacobean-style Ionic pilasters and stucco panels. The date 1875 is carved in stone above the porch.
