= C. D. Pelham =

American baseball player (born 1995)

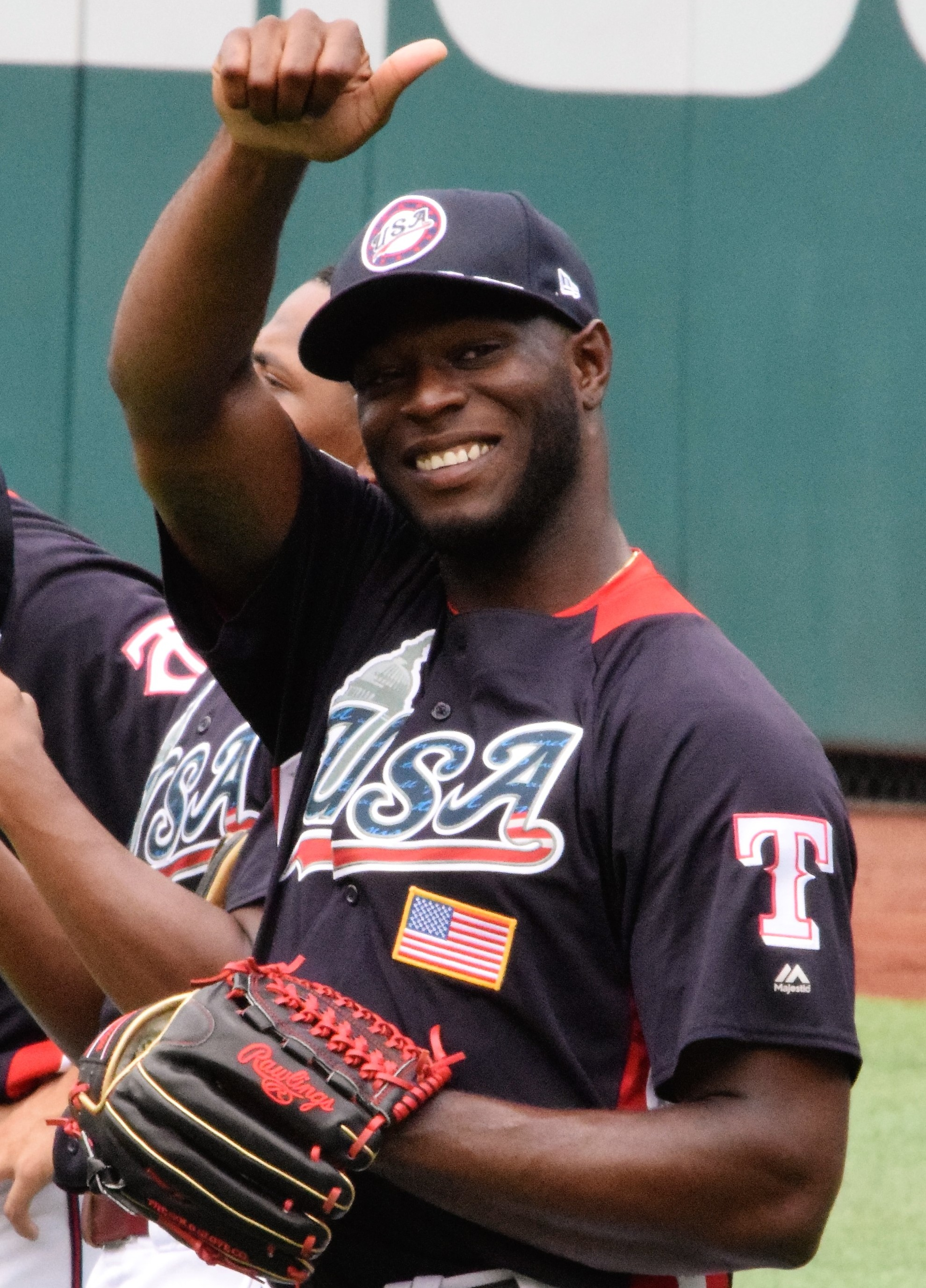
- Pelham at the 2018 All-Star Futures Game

Free agent
- Relief pitcher
- Born: February 21, 1995 (age 31); Lancaster, South Carolina, U.S.
- Bats: Right Throws: Left

MLB debut
- September 5, 2018, for the Texas Rangers

MLB statistics (through 2018 Season)
- Win–loss record: 0–0
- Earned run average: 7.04
- Strikeouts: 7
- Stats at Baseball Reference

Teams
- Texas Rangers (2018)

Christian Devont'a Pelham (born February 21, 1995) is an American professional baseball relief pitcher who is a free agent. He has previously played in Major League Baseball (MLB) for the Texas Rangers.

== Amateur career ==
Pelham attended Lancaster High School in Lancaster, South Carolina. Undrafted out of high school, he attended Spartanburg Methodist College to play college baseball. Following his freshman year of college, the Milwaukee Brewers selected him in the 25th round, with the 746th overall selection, of the 2014 MLB draft. He did not sign with Milwaukee, instead returning to college for his sophomore year.

== Professional career ==
=== Texas Rangers ===
The Texas Rangers drafted Pehlam in the 33rd round, with the 978th overall selection, of the 2015 Major League Baseball draft, and he signed with them. He began his professional career with the Arizona League Rangers of the Rookie-level Arizona League in 2015, going 4–0 with a 5.40 ERA and 24 strikeouts over 18 1/3 innings in 16 games. Pelham spent the 2016 season with the Spokane Indians of the Low-A Northwest League, posting a 0–6 record, 6.16 ERA, 50 strikeouts, and 38 innings pitched in 16 games (7 starts).

Pelham spent the 2017 season with the Hickory Crawdads of the Single-A South Atlantic League, posting a 4–2 record, 3.18 ERA, 75 strikeouts, and 62 1/3 innings over 37 games. Pelham began the 2018 season with the Down East Wood Ducks of the High-A Carolina League, posting a 0–0 record, 1.95 ERA, 34 strikeouts, and 27 2/3 innings in 23 games. He was promoted to the Frisco RoughRiders of the Double-A Texas League on June 22, and posted a 2–0 record, 6.16 ERA, 19 strikeouts, and 19 innings in 24 games. He was selected to represent the Rangers at the 2018 All-Star Futures Game.

The Rangers promoted Pelham to the major leagues for the first time on September 4, 2018. Pelham posted a 0–0 record, 7.04 ERA, 7 strikeouts, and 7 2/3 innings in 10 major league games. Following the 2018 season, Pelham played for the Surprise Saguaros of the Arizona Fall League. In 2019, Pelham split the season between Frisco and the Nashville Sounds of the Triple-A Pacific Coast League, combining to go 1–4 with a 11.97 ERA over 32 1/3 innings. Pelham was designated for assignment on November 20, 2019.

=== Chicago Cubs ===
On November 27, 2019, the Chicago Cubs claimed Pelham from the Rangers off of waivers. Pelham was outrighted off of the roster on January 24, 2020. He did not play in a game in 2020 due to the cancellation of the minor league season because of the COVID-19 pandemic. Pelham also missed the 2021 season due to an injury.

In 2022, Pelham made 29 appearances split between the Double-A Tennessee Smokies and the Triple-A Iowa Cubs, posting a cumulative 2–1 record and 4.35 ERA with 41 strikeouts and 2 saves in 41 1/3 innings pitched. He elected free agency following the season on November 10, 2022.

=== San Diego Padres ===
On March 9, 2023, Pelham signed a minor league contract with the San Diego Padres organization. He split the year between the rookie–level Arizona Complex League Padres, Single–A Lake Elsinore Storm, and Double–A San Antonio Missions. In 17 games between the three affiliates, Pelham recorded a 7.53 ERA with 16 strikeouts and 2 saves across 14 1/3 innings pitched. He elected free agency following the season on November 6.

=== Leones de Yucatán ===
On March 29, 2024, Pelham signed with the Leones de Yucatán of the Mexican League. In 17 appearances, Pelham posted a 2–1 record with a stellar 1.04 ERA and 18 strikeouts over 17 1/3 innings.

=== Los Angeles Angels ===
On May 31, 2024, Pelham's contract was purchased by the Los Angeles Angels and he was assigned to the Triple-A Salt Lake Bees. In 10 appearances split between Salt Lake and the rookie–level Arizona Complex League Angels, he compiled a 1.80 ERA with 12 strikeouts across 10 innings of work. Pelham was released by the Angels organization on July 28.

=== Athletics ===
On January 8, 2025, Pelham signed a minor league contract with the Athletics. He made 41 appearances for the Double-A Midland RockHounds, compiling a 3-4 record and 3.43 ERA with 47 strikeouts across 39 1/3 innings pitched. Pelham elected free agency following the season on November 6.

On January 23, 2026, Pelham re-signed with the Athletics organization on a minor league contract. Returning to Midland, he logged a 3.95 ERA with 15 strikeouts over 16 games; he also recorded a 5–0 record and 2.21 ERA with 17 strikeouts across 14 appearances for the Triple–A Las Vegas Aviators. Pelham was released by the team on July 18.

=== Pittsburgh Pirates ===
On July 19, 2026, Pelham signed a minor league contract with the Pittsburgh Pirates. In 18 games (2 starts) with Triple-A Indianapolis Indians he threw 23.2 innings going 0-1 with a 4.18 ERA with 19 strikeouts and one save. He elected free agency on November 2.
