= Simon Harcourt (1653–1724) =

English politician

Simon Harcourt (1653–1727), of the Middle Temple and Pendley Manor, Hertfordshire, was an English politician.

== Family ==
Harcourt was the son of Rev. Vere Harcourt and Lucy née Thornton. In 1677 he married his second wife Elizabeth, daughter of Sir Richard Anderson and Dame Elizabeth Anderson of Pendley Manor at Tring in Hertfordshire. Elizabeth died in June 1727 and her parents were both dead by 1699, and Harcourt inherited the manor.

Harcourt remarried several times: Elizabeth née Canon (d. 1706), then Elizabeth née Morse (d. 1724), and finally Mary née Harcourt, the daughter of his cousin Sir Philip Harcourt.

== Career ==
He was a Member (MP) of the Parliament of England and the Parliament of Great Britain for Aylesbury in the periods 21 December 1702 – 1705 and 1710–1715.

Parliament of the United Kingdom
Preceded by Sir John Pakington, 4th Bt; James Herbert	Member of Parliament for Aylesbury; 1702–1705; With: James Herbert to 1704; Sir Henry Parker, Bt 1704–05	Succeeded by Simon Mayne; Sir John Wittewronge, Bt
Preceded by Simon Mayne; Sir John Wittewronge, Bt	Member of Parliament for Aylesbury; 1710–1715; With: John Essington	Succeeded by John Deacle; Nathaniel Meade
