= John Essington (MP for Aylesbury) =

English politician

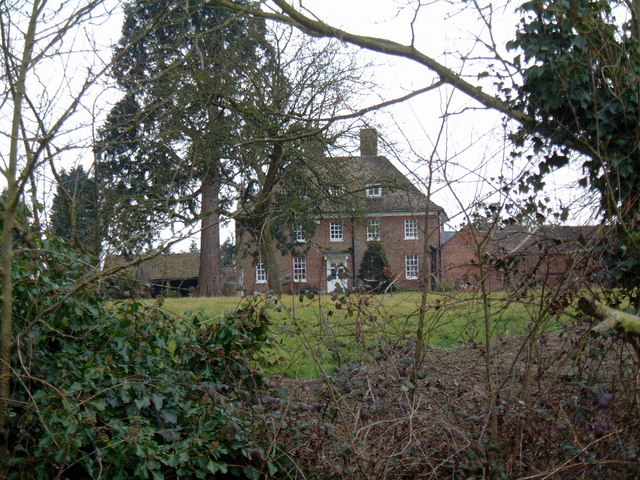
Gossington Hall, Slimbridge

John Essington (c. 1667–1740), of Gossington Hall, Slimbridge, Gloucestershire, was an English politician.

He was born the second son of John Essington of Gossington Hall and was trained in the law at Lincoln's Inn in 1691. He inherited Gossington Hall, which had been built by his grandfather, after the death of his elder brother in 1703.

He was a Member (MP) of the Parliament of Great Britain for Aylesbury from 1710 to 1715.

He married twice, firstly in 1697 Margaret, the daughter and coheiress of John Godfrey and secondly in 1702, Mary. He had one daughter, to whom he left his various properties.

Parliament of Great Britain
Preceded by Simon Mayne; Sir John Wittewronge, Bt	Member of Parliament for Aylesbury; 1710–1715; With: Simon Harcourt	Succeeded by John Deacle; Nathaniel Meade
