= Vere Harcourt =

The Reverend Vere Harcourt (1606 – 4 July 1683) was Archdeacon of Nottingham from 1660 to 1683.

He was born in Stanton Harcourt, Oxfordshire, the 3rd son of Robert Harcourt, adventurer with Sir Walter Raleigh, and Frances de Vere.

He studied at Emmanuel College, Cambridge, where he graduated with a B.A. in 1626–1627 M.A. in 1630 and D.D. in 1661.

He married Lucy Thornton, daughter of Roger Thornton of Snailswell in Cambridgeshire on 6 April 1643. His son, Simon Harcourt (1653–1724) was Clerk of the Crown.

He was the puritan minister appointed to St Mary's Church, Plumtree in 1647 and was made Rector. In the same year he was appointed Archdeacon of Nottingham.

He died on 4 July 1683 and was buried in St Mary's Church, Plumtree and his memorial is on the south sanctuary wall.
