= Dorian Williams (American football) =

American football player (born 2001)

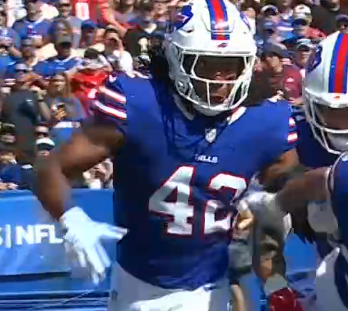
- Williams in 2025

No. 42 – Buffalo Bills
- Position: Linebacker
- Roster status: Active

Personal information
- Born: June 28, 2001 (age 25); Indian Land, South Carolina, U.S.
- Listed height: 6 ft 1 in (1.85 m)
- Listed weight: 228 lb (103 kg)

Career information
- High school: Indian Land
- College: Tulane (2019–2022)
- NFL draft: 2023: 3rd round, 91st overall pick

Career history
- Buffalo Bills (2023–present)

Awards and highlights
- First-team All-AAC (2022); Second-team All-AAC (2020)

Career NFL statistics as of Week 10, 2026
- Total tackles: 281
- Sacks: 1.0
- Forced fumbles: 1
- Fumble recoveries: 5
- Pass deflections: 7
- Interceptions: 2
- Stats at Pro Football Reference

Dorian Williams (born June 28, 2001) is an American professional football linebacker for the Buffalo Bills of the National Football League (NFL). He played college football for the Tulane Green Wave.

== Early life ==
Williams attended Indian Land High School in Indian Land, South Carolina. He committed to Tulane University to play college football.

== College career ==
Williams played at Tulane from 2019 to 2022. As a senior, he had 132 tackles, five sacks and two interceptions. For his career, he had 316 tackles, 9.5 sacks and two interceptions. He was named the defensive MVP of the 2023 Cotton Bowl Classic (January) after recording 17 tackles.

== Professional career ==
Pre-draft measurables
| Height | Weight | Arm length | Hand span | Wingspan | 40-yard dash | 10-yard split | 20-yard split | Vertical jump | Broad jump |
|---|---|---|---|---|---|---|---|---|---|
| 6 ft 1 in (1.85 m) | 228 lb (103 kg) | 33 3/4 in (0.86 m) | 10 1/4 in (0.26 m) | 6 ft 8 3/4 in (2.05 m) | 4.49 s | 1.54 s | 2.59 s | 35.0 in (0.89 m) | 10 ft 0 in (3.05 m) |
All values from NFL Combine/Pro Day

Williams was selected by the Buffalo Bills in the third round, 91st overall, of the 2023 NFL draft.

Following a rookie season in which he was primarily a backup, Williams was thrust into the starting lineup following a preseason injury to Matt Milano leading up to the 2024 season. Williams started 11 of 17 games he played in that season, accruing a team-leading 117 total tackles, including 5 for a loss, as well as 1 forced fumble and three fumble recoveries. Following Milano's return, Williams continued to be used heavily in three linebacker formations against the run despite Buffalo traditionally utilizing a nickel defense under head coach Sean McDermott.

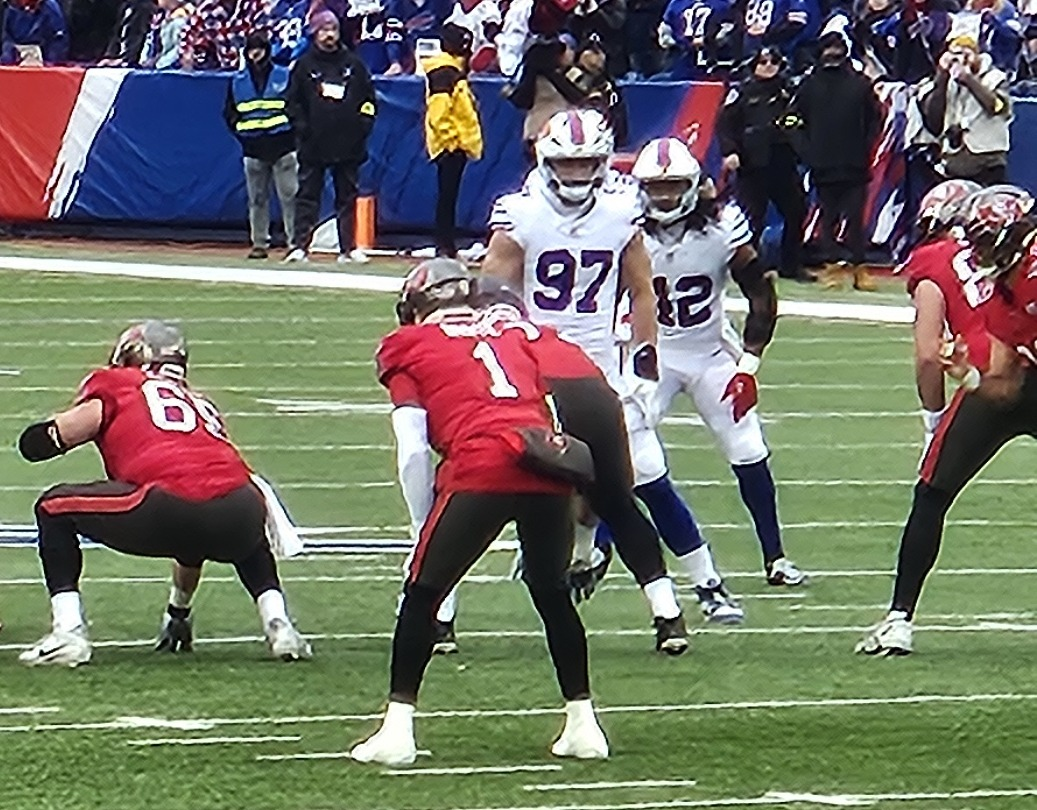
Williams (#42) and teammate Joey Bosa (#97) against the Tampa Bay Buccaneers in 2025

Williams missed his first professional game due to injury against the New England Patriots in 2025, and Buffalo suffered its first loss of the season without him in the lineup. He later made a key play against the Tampa Bay Buccaneers, recovering a forced fumble that sealed Buffalo's 44–32 win. Williams recorded an 82.5 rating from Pro Football Focus against the Buccaneers, the second highest among Bills defensive players that game.

In 2026, Williams recorded his first career interception off of Kirk Cousins in a week 6 win against the Las Vegas Raiders. He later recorded his first career sack off of Geno Smith in a week 10 win against the New York Jets.

== NFL career statistics ==
Legend
| **Bold** | Career high |

=== Regular season ===
| Year | Team | Games | | Tackles | | | | | Interceptions | | | | | | Fumbles | | | | |
| Year | Team | GP | GS | Cmb | Solo | Ast | Sck | TFL | Int | Yds | Avg | Lng | TD | PD | FF | Fmb | FR | Yds | TD |
|---|---|---|---|---|---|---|---|---|---|---|---|---|---|---|---|---|---|---|---|
| 2023 | BUF | 17 | 2 | 40 | 25 | 15 | 0.0 | 0 | 0 | 0 | 0.0 | 0 | 0 | 1 | 0 | 0 | 0 | 0 | 0 |
| 2024 | BUF | 17 | 11 | **117** | **68** | **49** | 0.0 | **5** | 0 | 0 | 0.0 | 0 | 0 | 0 | **1** | 0 | **3** | 0 | 0 |
| 2025 | BUF | 16 | 9 | 63 | 29 | 34 | 0.0 | 1 | 0 | 0 | 0.0 | 0 | 0 | 2 | 0 | 0 | 1 | 0 | 0 |
| 2026 | BUF | 9 | 9 | 61 | 27 | 34 | **1.0** | **5** | **2** | 0 | 0.0 | 0 | 0 | **4** | 0 | 0 | 1 | 0 | 0 |
| Career | | 59 | 31 | 281 | 149 | 132 | 1.0 | 11 | 2 | 0 | 0.0 | 0 | 0 | 7 | 1 | 0 | 5 | 0 | 0 |

=== Postseason ===
| Year | Team | Games | | Tackles | | | | | Interceptions | | | | | | Fumbles | | | | |
| Year | Team | GP | GS | Cmb | Solo | Ast | Sck | TFL | Int | Yds | Avg | Lng | TD | PD | FF | Fmb | FR | Yds | TD |
|---|---|---|---|---|---|---|---|---|---|---|---|---|---|---|---|---|---|---|---|
| 2023 | BUF | 2 | 0 | **10** | **6** | **4** | 0.0 | **1** | 0 | 0 | 0.0 | 0 | 0 | 0 | 0 | 0 | 0 | 0 | 0 |
| 2024 | BUF | 3 | 1 | 7 | **6** | 1 | 0.0 | **1** | 0 | 0 | 0.0 | 0 | 0 | 0 | 0 | 0 | 0 | 0 | 0 |
| 2025 | BUF | 2 | 1 | 3 | 3 | 0 | 0.0 | 0 | 0 | 0 | 0.0 | 0 | 0 | 0 | 0 | 0 | 0 | 0 | 0 |
| Career | | 7 | 2 | 20 | 15 | 5 | 0.0 | 2 | 0 | 0 | 0.0 | 0 | 0 | 0 | 0 | 0 | 0 | 0 | 0 |
