= Sir John Wittewronge, 3rd Baronet =

British Army officer and politician

Sir John Wittewronge, 3rd Baronet (1673 – 1722), of Stantonbury, Buckinghamshire, was a British Army officer and Whig politician who sat in the English and British House of Commons between 1705 and 1722.

== Family ==
Wittewronge was baptized on 11 July 1673, the third, but eldest surviving, son of Sir John Wittewronge, 2nd Baronet. His mother was Wittewronge's second wife, Martha Seabrook of Mark Lane, London. Wittewronge married Mary née White, daughter of Samuel White, a London merchant.

== Career ==
In 1709, Wittewronge was given the colonelcy of a new regiment raised in Ireland, but he was put on half-pay in 1712 when it was disbanded.

Wittewronge was returned as Member of Parliament for Aylesbury at the 1705 English general election. He was returned again at the 1708 British general election. At the 1713 British general election he was returned as MP for Chipping Wycombe.

He died on 26 January 1722, survived by 3 sons and 4 daughters. He was succeeded as baronet by his eldest son John, who was later killed in a brawl in the Fleet Prison. He left Stantonbury in trust to provide for all his children, as well as his mistress and a further two illegitimate sons by her. It was eventually sold in 1727 to the Duchess of Marlborough.

Parliament of England
Preceded by Simon Harcourt; Sir Henry Parker, Bt	Member of Parliament for Aylesbury; 1705–1707; With: Simon Mayne	Succeeded by Parliament of Great Britain
Parliament of Great Britain
Preceded by Parliament of England	Member of Parliament for Aylesbury; 1707–1710; With: Simon Mayne	Succeeded by Simon Harcourt; John Essington
Preceded by Charles Godfrey; Sir Thomas Lee, Bt	Member of Parliament for Chipping Wycombe; 1713–1722; With: Sir Thomas Lee, Bt	Succeeded by John Neale; Sir Thomas Lee, Bt
Baronetage of England
Preceded by John Wittewrong	Baronet (of Stantonbury); 1697 – 1722	Succeeded by John Wittewrong
