= Dorian Williams (equestrian) =

British equestrian, journalist, broadcaster, author and patron of the arts

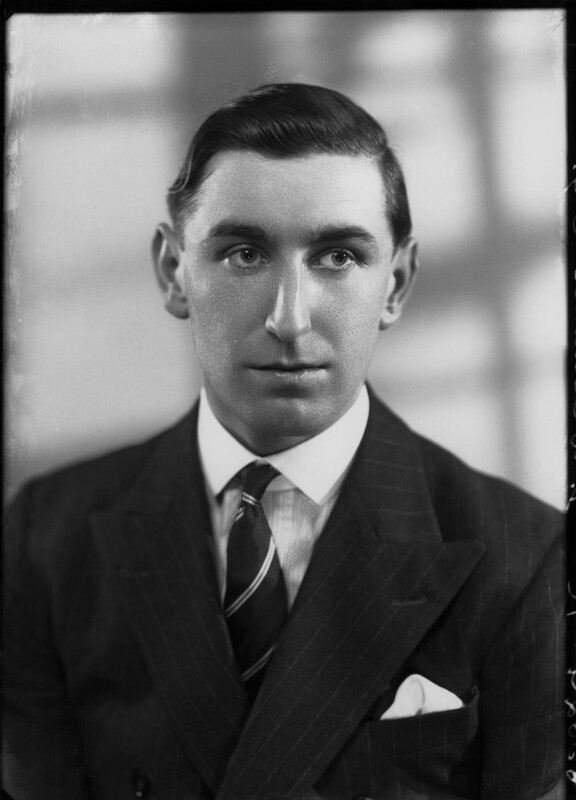
Williams in 1938

Joseph George Dorian Williams OBE (1 July 1914 – 21 July 1985) was a British equestrian, journalist, broadcaster, author and patron of the arts.

== Life ==
Williams was educated at Hawtreys prep school, then Harrow School and served as a soldier.

He was, from the 1950s until his retirement in 1980, the voice of show jumping on British television, succeeded by Raymond Brooks-Ward who broadcast with Williams from 1956. He was largely responsible for making it into a mainstream TV sport that was enjoyed by millions throughout the 1970s and continues to be enjoyed. His final broadcast as a full-time commentator was at the Olympia Horse Show in December 1980, although he continued to commentate on pre-recorded (filmed) coverage of dressage once a year until 1984.

In addition to his TV work he was also an author, writing the Wendy series which were aimed at children and could be termed "traditional pony books". He also wrote two adult horse novels and several works of non fiction concerning show jumping and equestrianism in general.

He was Chairman of the British Horse Society, and instrumental in setting up a National Equestrian Centre at Stoneleigh Abbey in Warwickshire. He was also Master of the Whaddon Chase hunt. He was appointed OBE in the 1978 New Year Honours.

In 1949 he founded the Pendley Open Air Shakespeare Festival in the grounds of his ancestral family home of Pendley Manor near Tring, Hertfordshire.

He married twice:

- 1. The Hon. Moyra Lubbock 1938 (marriage dissolved 1949)
- 2. Jennifer (one daughter Carola and one son Piers)

He died from pancreatic cancer in July 1985 following an earlier cancer operation in 1973.

In 2005, he was one of the inaugural laureates appointed to The British Horse Society Equestrian Hall of Fame.
