= Sir John Wittewrong, 1st Baronet =

Sir John Wittewrong, 1st Baronet (1 November 1618 – 23 June 1693) was an English parliamentarian colonel and squire of Rothamsted Manor.

== Life ==
The Wittewrongs were a Flemish Protestant family who in 1564 left Ghent in the Spanish Netherlands for London. Jacques Wittewrong came to London with his wife and two children. Most of the Wittewrong family followed Jacques, who made a career as a public notary, and died in 1593.

John Wittewrong was a grandson of Jacques, and son of Jacob Wittewrong(le) (1558–1622) by his second wife Anna, daughter of Garrard Vanaker of Antwerp, a merchant. Jacob was a wealthy brewer. On Jacob's death, Anna married Thomas Myddelton, as his fourth wife, and survived him. Through his stepfather John gained a Welsh connection, and he was later High Sheriff of Montgomeryshire for 1665 through the manor of Talerddig.

He was knighted in 1640, and then fought on the side of Parliament in the English Civil War as Colonel of the Orange Auxiliary Regiment, Hertfordshire Trained Bands. He was High Sheriff of Hertfordshire in 1658. In religion he was an Independent, at one time a member of the congregation of William Bridge, and later supported ministers of nonconforming views.,

He bought land at Wheathampstead in 1649. He was created baronet in 1662, and in 1667 bought Stantonbury from Sir John Temple, where he built a mansion of which only a few traces are left. He also owned Rothamsted Manor; the family had leased it from 1611, and purchased it in 1623, after which Sir John made many alterations.

John Witteronge was a weather diarist

== The Diary ==
When the weather diary was written, the Julian Calendar (Old Style) was in use in England, and all dates are therefore 10 days behind the present calendar. To make Sir John's dates consistent with today's calendar 10 days must be added. Also the new year ‘began’ on 25 March although 1 January was often thought of as the start of the year. To avoid confusion dates from 1 January to 24 March were often written as (for example) 1684/5 and this was practised by Sir John in his Diary. (Williams & Stevenson (HRS)) 1999.

The diary records the weather on a regular basis. Sir John was one of the first private individuals to own a domestic barometer (Banfield 1978) or Weather Glass. The approximate relationship between the state of the weather and height of the mercury had been discovered by about 1644. The values in use at this time (1684) have remained generally unaltered to the present day

== Notes ==
Baronetage of England
New creation	Baronet (of Stantonbury); 1662–1693	Succeeded by John Wittewrong
