= Wittewrong baronets =

Extinct baronetcy in the Baronetage of England

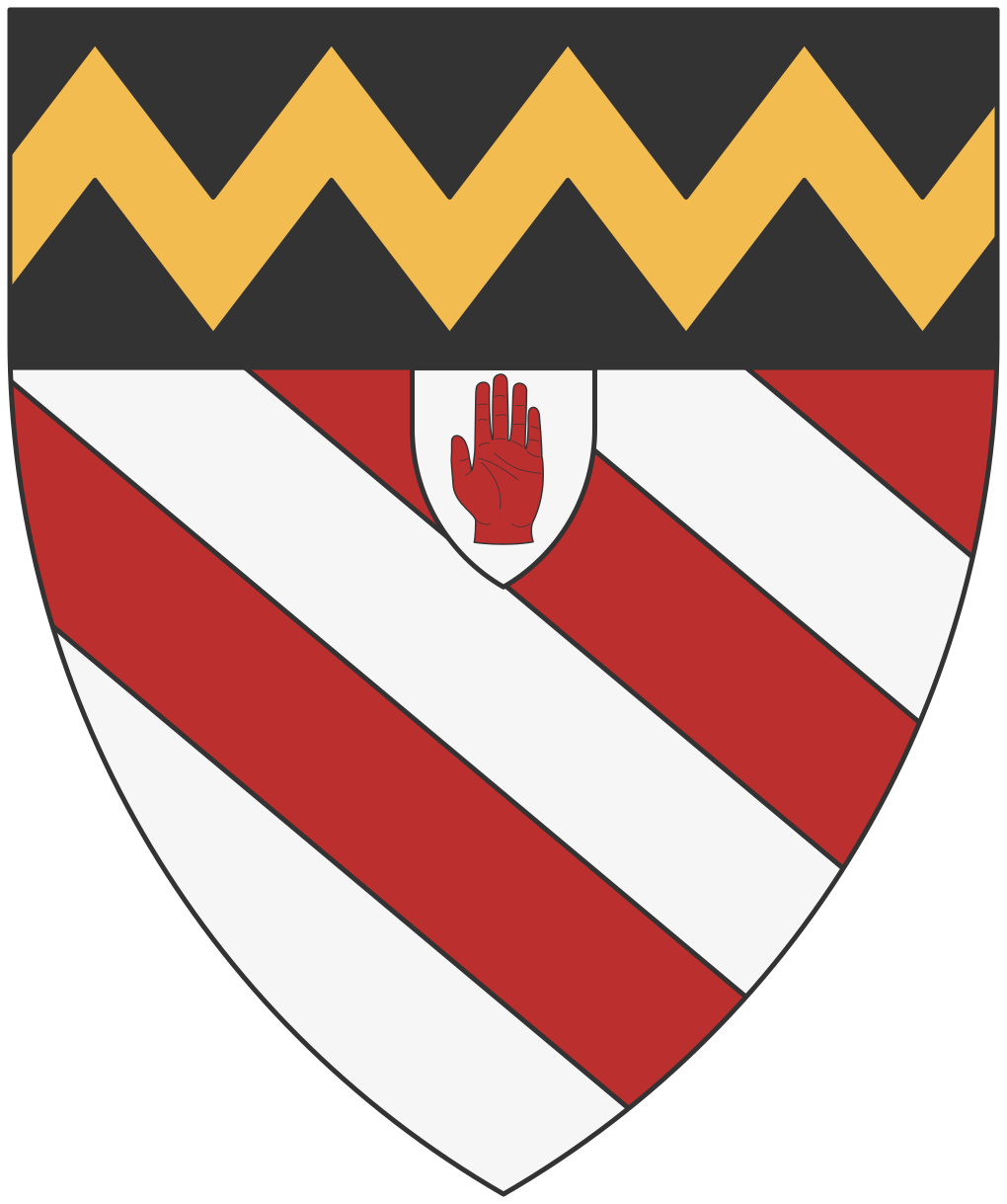
Arms of Wittewrong of Stantonbury

The Wittewrong Baronetcy, of Stantonbury in the County of Buckingham, was a title in the Baronetage of England. It was created on 2 May 1662 for Sir John Wittewrong, a former parliamentarian colonel and Member of Parliament for Hertfordshire. The name was spelt in different ways, including Wittewronge and Wittwronge. The third Baronet sat as Member of Parliament for Aylesbury and Wycombe. The title became extinct on the death of the sixth Baronet in 1771.

The Wittewrongs were a Flemish Protestant family who in 1564 left Ghent in the Spanish Netherlands for London.

== Wittewrong baronets, of Stantonbury (1662) ==
- Sir John Wittewrong, 1st Baronet (1618–1693)
- Sir John Wittewrong, 2nd Baronet (1640–1697)
- Sir John Wittewrong, 3rd Baronet (1673–1722)
- Sir John Wittewrong, 4th Baronet (1695–1743)
- Sir William Wittewrong, 5th Baronet (1697–1761)
- Sir John Wittewrong, 6th Baronet (died 1771)

== See also ==
- Lawes baronets
