= Buford's Massacre Site =

Memorial to the American Revolutionary War in South Carolina, United States

- U.S. National Register of Historic Places
- U.S. Historic district
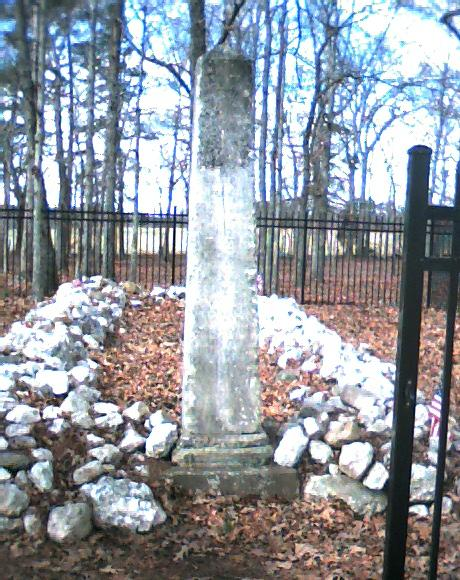
- Waxhaw Massacre Monument, February 2005

- Location within South Carolina Location within the United States
- Location: South Carolina Highway 522, 0.25 miles south of South Carolina Highway 9, near Buford Community, Lancaster, South Carolina
- Coordinates: 34°44′26″N 80°37′35″W
- Area: 2 acres (0.81 ha)
- Built: 1860, 1955
- Built by: White, William T.
- MPS: Lancaster County MPS
- NRHP reference No.: 90000091
- Added to NRHP: February 15, 1990

Buford's Massacre Site, also known as Buford's Battleground, is a historic site and national historic district located near Lancaster, South Carolina. Two monuments at the site mark the battleground where the Battle of Waxhaws (also known as Buford's massacre) took place. A white monument ten feet tall, erected on June 2, 1860, marked the gravesite of American soldiers who died during the battle. This marker was gradually damaged over time by souvenir hunters who chipped off pieces, which led local authorities to erect a new monument on May 1, 1955, bearing the same inscription. The Battle of Waxhaws was a minor engagement during the American Revolutionary War between the Continental Army and Loyalist forces led by British colonel Banastre Tarleton.

It was added to the United States National Register of Historic Places in 1990.
