= Lancaster County School District =

School district in South Carolina, United States

Address
- 300 South Catawba Street Lancaster, South Carolina, 29720; United States

District information
- Type: Public
- Grades: PreK–12
- NCES District ID: 4502580

Students and staff
- Students: 13,940
- Teachers: 900.5
- Staff: 729.87
- Student–teacher ratio: 15.48

Other information
- Website: www.lancastercsd.com

Lancaster County School District is a school district headquartered in Lancaster, South Carolina. It serves Lancaster County.

== Schools ==
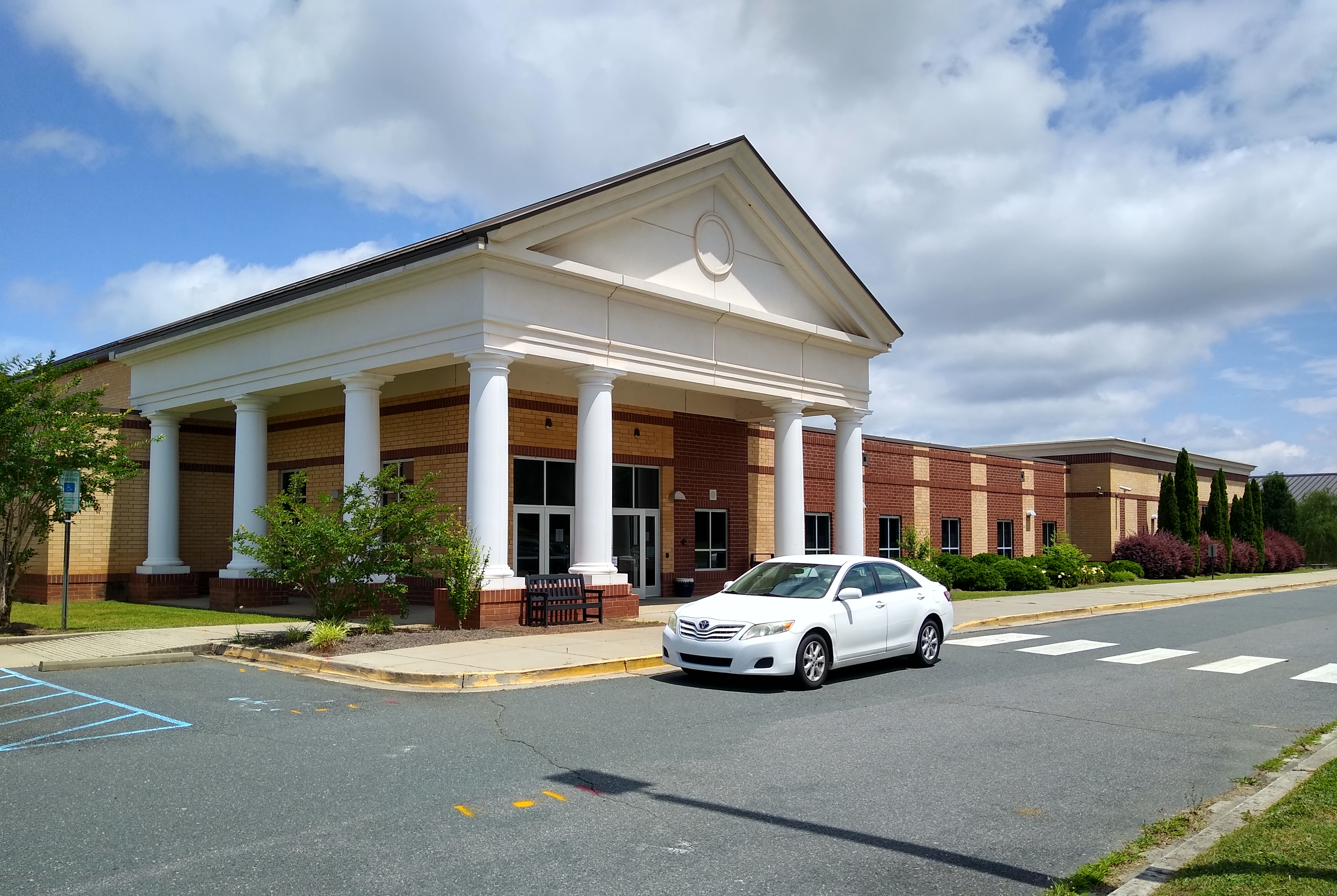
Indian Land Middle School

High schools

- Buford High School
- Indian Land High School
- Andrew Jackson High School
- Lancaster High School
- Lancaster County Career Center

Middle schools

- A.R. Rucker Middle School
- Buford Middle School
- Indian Land Middle School
- Andrew Jackson Middle School
- South Middle School

Intermediate schools

- Indian Land Intermediate School

Elementary schools

- Brooklyn Springs Elementary School
- Buford Elementary School
- Clinton Elementary School
- Discovery School/GT
- Erwin Elementary School
- Harrisburg Elementary School
- Heath Springs Elementary School
- Indian Land Elementary School
- Kershaw Elementary School
- McDonald Green Elementary School
- North Elementary School
- Van Wyck Elementary School

Preschool

- Southside Early Childhood Center

Other

- Adult Education
- Barr Street Learning Center
