= Indian Land, South Carolina =

- Unincorporated community
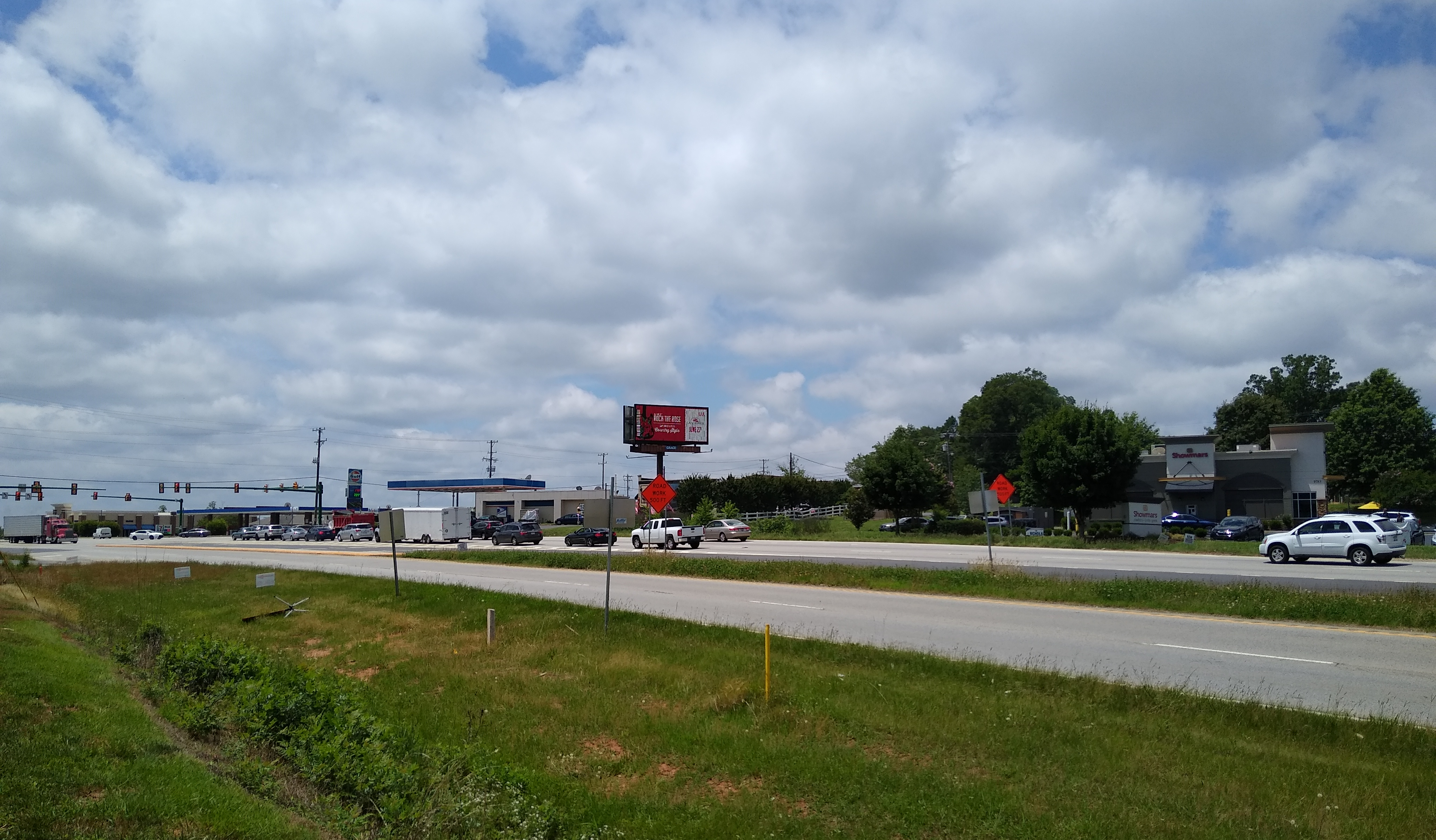
- U.S. Route 521 in Indian Land

- Location within South Carolina Location within the United States
- Country: United States
- State: South Carolina
- County: Lancaster

Population (2020)
  - Total: 32,759
- Time zone: UTC-5 (Eastern (EST))
  - Summer (DST): UTC-4 (EDT)
- ZIP code: 29707
- Area codes: 803 and 839

Indian Land is an unincorporated community in the northernmost part (the "Panhandle") of Lancaster County, South Carolina, United States. It lies six miles east of Fort Mill, and west of the village of Marvin and town of Waxhaw, North Carolina. It is part of the Charlotte metropolitan area. While not incorporated, the community is assigned with the ZIP code 29707. U.S. Highway 521 is a major highway that runs through the community and connects Indian Land with cities in North Carolina, and Lancaster County to the south. Indian Land does not have a downtown.

== Education ==
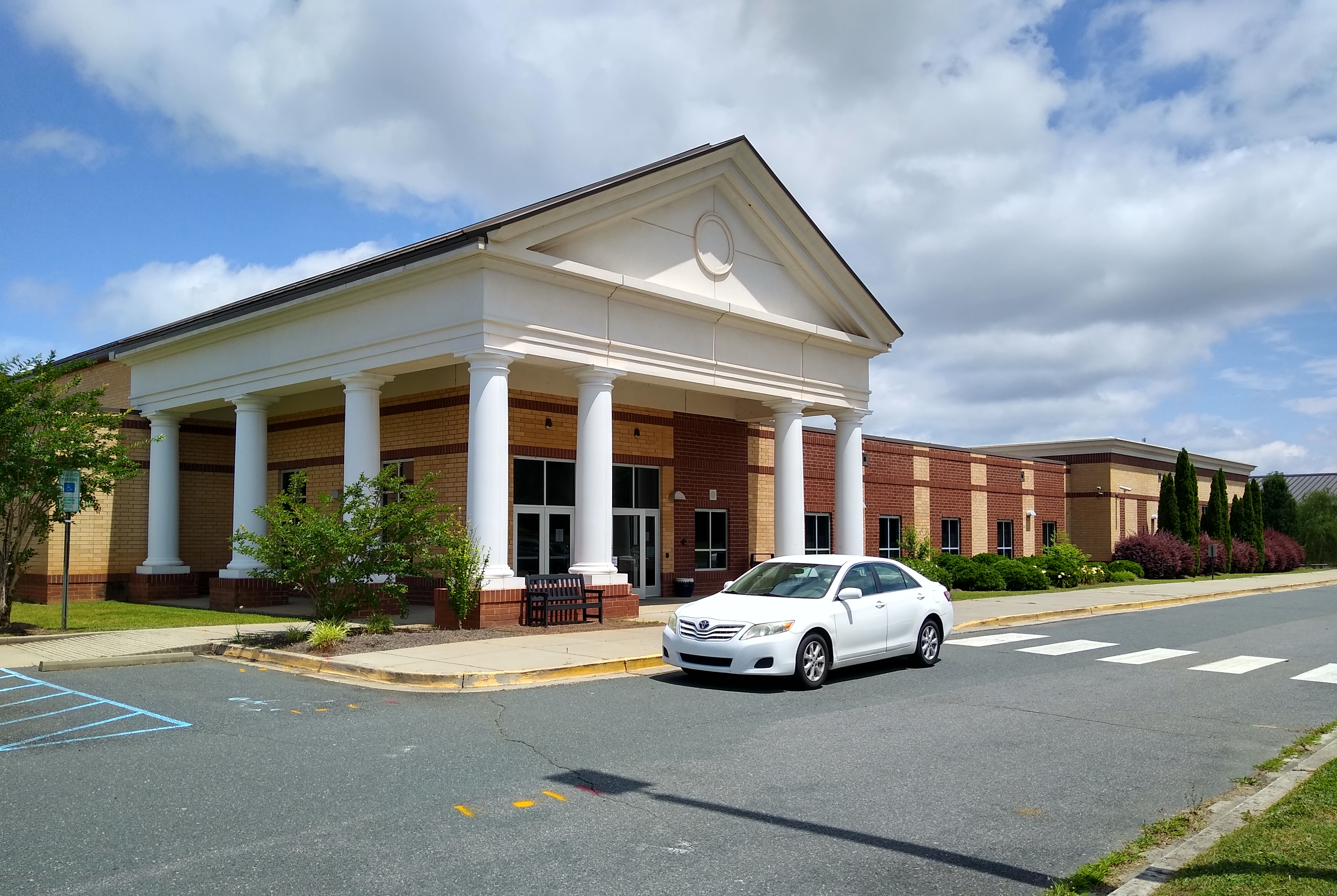
Indian Land Middle School

Schools in Indian Land include Indian Land Elementary, Harrisburg Elementary, Van Wyck Elementary, Indian Land Intermediate School, Indian Land Middle School, and Indian Land High School as well as Nation Ford High School. In 2006, Indian Land High School earned state recognition for being a Red Carpet School. Indian Land Middle School has been recognized as a National School to Watch, a State School of Character, a Palmetto Gold School, and a Red Carpet School. Harrisburg Elementary School was recognized as a National School of Character for 2017. Van Wyck Elementary School opened in August 2018 to serve the southern end of Indian Land and the Town of Van Wyck.

Indian Land has a public library, a branch of the Lancaster County Library.

In August 2018, the University of South Carolina Lancaster began offering courses in the Indian Land High School building.

In August 2021, the New Indian Land High School opened. With the opening of this new school, the former high school building was changed to Indian Land Middle School (teaching students in the 7th and 8th grades), and Indian Land Intermediate School (which was formerly Indian Land Middle School) now teaches students in the 5th and 6th grades.

== Transportation ==
U.S. Route 521 and South Carolina Highway 160 are two major roads that run through Indian Land. U.S. Route 521, the main road that Indian Land runs through, is lined with retail, businesses, and restaurants. Indian Land does not have public transportation.

== Public Safety ==
The Lancaster County Sheriff's Office (LACSO) is the principal law enforcement in Indian Land, SC. They have a substation located on Sandal Brook Road in Indian Land.

The Indian Land Fire District (ILFD) provides fire protection and technical rescue for the Indian Land Region, As well as Emergency Medical Services in co-operation with the Lancaster County EMS. The ILFD was formed from 2 former County Stations, The Indian Land Fire Rescue and Pleasant Valley Fire Department. The ILFD currently Operates out of 2 Stations, Station 1 being located on 6 Mile Creek Road in South Indian Land. And Station 2 being located on Possum Hollow Road in the North End.

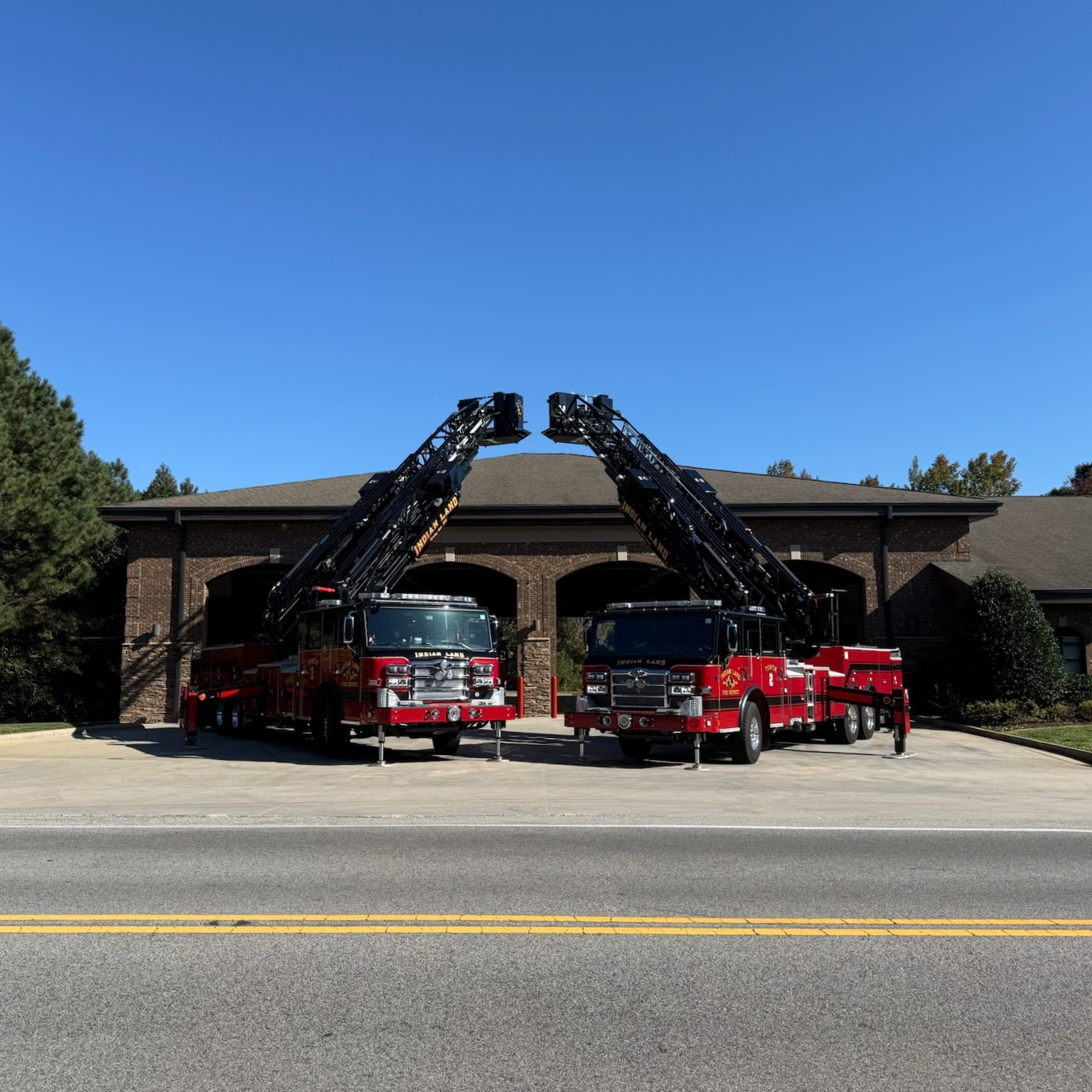

== Highway Corridor Overlay District ==
The third and final reading of the Panhandle's Highway Corridor Overlay District was approved on June 9, 2014, which applies to properties along Charlotte Highway (U.S. 521) from Waxhaw Highway (S.C. 75) north to the state line and Fort Mill Highway (S.C. 160) east to the county line. The overlay district sets aesthetic requirements on new construction along the corridors covering everything from building materials, placement and setbacks to signage, sidewalks and landscaping.

== Incorporation defeated ==
An unsuccessful vote to incorporate took place on March 27, 2018. Results were 83% against incorporation with a 42% voter turnout.

== Notable people ==
- Shawn Crawford (born 1978), sprinter, gold medalist in the 200 metres at the 2004 Summer Olympics
- Mick Mulvaney (born 1967), former acting White House Chief of Staff and 41st Director of the Office of Management and Budget (OMB)
- Louise Pettus (1926–2021), history professor and author
- Darnell Rogers (born 1997), former college basketball player
- Dorian Williams (born 2001), NFL linebacker for the Buffalo Bills
