= Andrew Jackson High School (South Carolina) =

Location
- 6925 Kershaw-Camden Highway; Kershaw, South Carolina; United States; 34°34′24″N 80°36′47″W

Information
- School type: High School
- Established: 1969
- School district: Lancaster County School District
- Principal: Shuntay Miller
- Teaching staff: 44.20 (FTE)
- Grades: 9-12
- Enrollment: 594 (2023-2024)
- Average class size: 30
- Student to teacher ratio: 13.44
- Colors: Orange and White
- Athletics: Football, Basketball, Baseball, Softball, Track and Field, Wrestling, Golf, Cross Country (Swim Team at Lancaster High School)
- Mascot: Volunteer
- Rival: Buford High School, North Central High School
- Website: http://ajhs.lancastercsd.com/

Andrew Jackson High School is a public high school in Kershaw, South Carolina, United States. It is within the Lancaster County School District.

== State Championships ==
Boys Basketball - 1975, 1980

Girls Basketball - 1971, 1983, 2024, 2025

Baseball - 2022

Softball - 2006, 2007

Volleyball - 1983, 1991
