= Portuguese Conquest of Maricay =

Colonial series of battles between the Netherlands (aided by England) and Portugal

- Part of Dutch–Portuguese War
Date	1623 - 1632
Location	Gurupá and the Cabo Norte region
Result	Portuguese expel Dutch and English settlers from the Brazilian Amazon
Territorial changes	Colonial Brazil is expanded to the delta of the Xingu River

Belligerents
Portugal	Dutch Republic: Dutch West India Company; England Nheengaíba natives

Commanders and leaders
Bento Maciel Parente; Pedro Teixeira; Luís Aranha de Vasconcelos	(Dutch West India Company) Hosdan; (Dutch West India Company) Peter Ariansson; (Dutch West India Company) Hendrick Lucifer; (Kingdom of Ireland) Phillip Purcell; (Kingdom of England) Roger North; (Kingdom of England) Roger Fry

Strength
Hundreds of Portuguese soldiers and thousands of native allies	Unknown, at least in the hundreds

Casualties and losses
Unknown, presumably light	Hundreds of Dutch and English killed and captured Allied native tribes razed

The Portuguese Conquest of Maricay was a series of battles between the Portuguese Empire under the Iberian Union and the Dutch Republic, taking place in 1623 in the trading post of Maricay, now Gurupá. Taking place one year before the Capture of Bahia, the battle is one of the events leading to thirty years of war between the Portuguese and Dutch in Brazil.

== Background ==
With the death of King Sebastian in 1578, the throne passed to the king of Spain, Philip II of Spain, forming the Iberian Union. Being at war with Spain, the Dutch Republic lost access to commerce with Portugal and its colonies. Due to these issues, the Netherlands would start the Dutch–Portuguese War to challenge Portuguese Commerce across the world, forming the Dutch East India Company in 1602 and the Dutch West India Company in 1621.

In the early XVII century, companies in Vlissingen and London financed Dutch and English settling in the Amazon, founding the now lost forts of Orange and Nassau in 1599, as well as small trading posts. 1619, the Dutch would form trading posts in the Amazon River, the Forte do Morro da Velha Pobre near Almeirim, Pará and the fort of Muturu, and finally Maricay, named after the nearby indigenous people. Maricay was built on the right side of the Amazon to trade with the natives. There they traded the so called Drogas do sertão, such as Urucum as well as start the farming of sugarcane and tobacco. The strategic position of the Dutch outposts at the delta of the Xingu River, blocked further expansion by Portugal westward.

In the same period, the Portuguese would also expand westward. They would conquer São Luís in 1612 during the Battle of Guaxenduba and found Belém in 1616. In the same year conflict would brew, with Pedro Teixeira capturing and burning a Dutch ship in the coast of Maricay. In 1619, Manuel de Souza E'ça (who would be captain-major of the Captaincy of Grão-Pará in 1624), would write about the importance of removing the Dutch and English from the Gurupá river. As soon as 1613, scouting parties under Martim Soares Moreno would explore the region to locate Dutch and English positions in the region, leading to small skirmishes.

== The battle ==
The Fort of Maricay was located into one of the few elevated points in the region. Its exact location would be discovered in 1623 with the capture of two Dutch soldiers. In the same year Luís Aranha de Vasconcelos (also a future captain-major of Grão-Pará) arrived in the region with orders from Madrid ordering the recoinaissance and elimination of any Dutch forts in the region. He initially retreated in the direction of Belém when realizing he was outnumbered by the enemy. In the way he would be met by the current captain-major of Pará, Bento Maciel Parente, bringing troops including over a thousand native archers who were mobilized by Franciscan friars. They would join forces and attack the Dutch and British fortifications across the Cabo Norte.

The Portuguese would sail north, bordering the Island of Marajó, to prevent sailing the open sea where British and Dutch ships could have an advantage. They would instead sail small channels in the delta of the Amazon River, reaching the fortress of Maricay undetected.

Combat would start in may 23, as soon as the Portuguese disembarked, with exchange of guns and arrows between the two forces. The troops of Bento Marciel in "Phalanx" formation vigorously charged the Dutch forces. Being taken by surprise and significantly outnumbered by the enemy, the Dutch broke and fled. The portuguese lost only four soldiers; and while Dutch casualties were light, they lost several of their ships during the rout. The commander of the garrisson, named only as Hosdan, died in the combat.

From the channel of Gurupá, the Portuguese would sail towards the Muturu Fort via the Xingu river, with the defenders being caught by surprise, given how the Portuguese had to pass the Maricay and Orange forts to reach it. A hundred and thirty six prisoners would be captured between Dutch, native and Angolan slaves. They would be brought back to Belém by Luís Aranha while Bento Maciel kept advancing.

The portuguese advance would force the Dutch to flee to English and Irish settlements in the region. The pursuing Portuguese would be stopped by a Dutch ship under Peter Ariansson, that would be moored and then torched to avoid being captured. Bento Maciel would establish a fort in the mouth of the Cajari River not knowing about the English location nearby. The English would raze the fort once Bento Maciel left.

After the fighting, Bento Maciel would found the Fort of Santo Antônio do Gurupá over the ruins of the Fort of Maricay. A naval battle outside the fort would follow, with the Dutch losing a hundred twenty five soldiers in the process. With the fortress established, the Portuguese would focus on removing the settlers from the island of Gurupá proper. They would follow by sailing down the Paru River, where they would again be engaged by Peter Ariansson, giving the space for Hendrick Lucifer to sail around the Portuguese to establish the fort of Mandiutuba, putting Nikolaas Oudaen in charge.

== The subsequent capture of English Forts ==
In 1625, Pedro Teixeira would return to the region with additional 50 Portuguese soldiers and three hundred native allies. The fort of Mandiutuba would be stormed and taken, with Lucifer and Oudaen retreating and Dutch, English and Irish settlers fleeing to the Felipe river. The Anglo-Dutch forces would have Irish engineer Phillip Purcell to create two fortified houses, garrissoning eighty men in then. Those houses would be taken next by Teixeira, with the Anglo-Dutch forces losing sixty men. Oudaen would be killed and Phillip would be sent to Spain. Afterwards, the forts of Tilletille and Uarimiuaca would also be razed. The survivors would flee to Oiapoque, where most of them would die in combat with the Carib people.

In 1628, Robert Harcourt was ordered to send a hundred settlers to Fort Taurege, but he would disobey the orders and bring them to Oiapoque, and a next flotilla with reinforcements would be sent, but wouldn't arrive in time. Pedro da Costa Favela, a captain from Pernambuco, would try a surprise attack against the fort and be defeated, with the catholic Irish releasing captured Portuguese attackers saying that they do not wish for a war with the Portuguese. Pedro da Costa Favela would then retreat to the Fort of Gurupá (the old fort of Maricay) after the failed attack.

Pedro Teixeira would then arrive with two thousand men in ninety six canoes, vastly outnumbering the defenders. He would first attack native tribes allied to the fort, and then lay siege to the fort itself. After 26 days of siege, it would fall and the fort razed (after the capture of its artillery). Accounts vary about the fate of the prisoners, with Portuguese sources saying they were captured and Irish sources saying that Pedro Teixeira killed fifty four of them. The Portuguese would then intercept Roger North's fleet who arrived late with reinforcements, with North retreating to Santana.

After being beaten by Teixeira and losing the pinnace Nymph of the sea, North decided to found a stronger fort known as Fort Phillip would start construction in 1629, between the Matapi River and Vila Nova rivers, receiving a new wave of settlers to man them, as well as an outpost known only as Taurege II, possibly in the Taurege (now Preto) River.

The Governor of Pará, Jacomé Raimundo de Noronha, arrived from Belém to reinforce Pedro da Costa Favela, bringing his force to eighty soldiers and eight hundred native Nheengaíba allies. As with Taurege, the Portuguese would first attack the natives allied with the English. Jacomé Raimundo de Noronha would write that the attack against the natives was so aggressive that every "gentile" (as in pagan native) was "destroyed" in the massacre. Taurege II was taken first, with Fort Phillips being defeated shortly afterwards, with surrounding plantations also being raided. Eighty six English soldiers died and thirteen were imprisoned. Like with Tauregue, the fort was razed after the siege.

With every other fort in the region destroyed, the English would be left only with Fort Cumaú, built in Santana, in the left margin of the Amazon river, the same island where the Tucuju peoples were located. Built by Roger Fry, it would have the largest of all garrisons in the region, expecting five hundred English soldiers and many allied natives, as well as the ship Little Hopewell and two Pataches. It had an ambitious plan of replacing Belém as the most populous town in the Amazon, with requests for fifty pieces of artillery and an additional five hundred settlers, more than those who founded Belém and São Luís. When Fry arrived and saw the destruction of Fort Phillip, he sent Little Hopewell and one of the pataches back to England and left a smaller crew to build the fortress.

Sensing the opportunity to finish the English once and for all, a force led by Feliciano Coelho de Carvalho, Ayres de Sousa Chichorro and e Pedro Baião de Abreu composed of two hundred and forty soldiers and five thousand Tucuju allies sailed to destroy the enemy. The English had no recourse against such a large force, and so the last fort fell in June 19, 1632, with Fry dying in the fighting.

== Aftermath ==
The conquest of Maricay and surrounding fortifications would prevent further European invasions of Portuguese Amazon and allow further Portuguese expansion in the region. In 1646, the Dutch would erect a fort in the nearby Macaiaré River and in the following year they would send a fleet of eight ships to retake Maricay, by then renamed to Gurupá, being beaten by the captain-major of the Captaincy of Grão-Pará, Sebastião Lucena de Azevedo.

Gurupá, due to its strategic position in the mouth of the Xingu would become the starting point for many Portuguese expeditions westward. In 1637, soldiers and Franciscan friars under Juan de Palácios sailed to Quito in an Evangelization mission; as did Pedro Teixeira in the same year, but for military and commercial reasons. António Raposo Tavares would reach Gurupá in 1651 with the 59 Brazilian and a low number of Tupi survivors of his Bandeirante expedition, which left São Paulo in 1648 and traversed over twelve thousand kilometers in total, dramatically increasing the borders of colonial Brazil in the process.

The region where Maricay was located would become part of the captaincy of Cabo Norte in 1637. With the creation of the Ultramarine Council in 1642 as well as founding hereditary captaincies in the region, the speed of the colonization of the Amazon would significantly increase. By removing other European powers from lands that, by the Treaty of Tordesillas, should belong to Spain, Portuguese settlers would be able to expand significantly into what legally was Spanish territory, something that Spain would regret once the Iberian Union ended in 1640.

While most of the other forts in the war would be destroyed, the Fort of Cumaú would be rebuilt by the Portuguese in 1658, then properly rebuilt in 1688 as the Forte de Santo Antônio do Macapá, to guard the Amazon basin. The fort would be attacked and taken by the Marquis of Férolles, governor of French Guyana, during the French invasion of Amapá, but retaken by the portuguese weeks afterwards.

== See Also ==
- Dutch invasions of Brazil
- Portuguese conquest of Maranhão
