= 1629 =

1629 in various calendars
- Gregorian calendar: 1629; MDCXXIX
- Ab urbe condita: 2382
- Armenian calendar: 1078; ԹՎ ՌՀԸ
- Assyrian calendar: 6379
- Balinese saka calendar: 1550–1551
- Bengali calendar: 1035–1036
- Berber calendar: 2579
- English Regnal year: 4 Cha. 1 – 5 Cha. 1
- Buddhist calendar: 2173
- Burmese calendar: 991
- Byzantine calendar: 7137–7138
- Chinese calendar: 戊辰年 (Earth Dragon); 4326 or 4119 — to — 己巳年 (Earth Snake); 4327 or 4120
- Coptic calendar: 1345–1346
- Discordian calendar: 2795
- Ethiopian calendar: 1621–1622
- Hebrew calendar: 5389–5390
- Hindu calendars
- Vikram Samvat: 1685–1686
- Shaka Samvat: 1550–1551
- Kali Yuga: 4729–4730
- Holocene calendar: 11629
- Igbo calendar: 629–630
- Iranian calendar: 1007–1008
- Islamic calendar: 1038–1039
- Japanese calendar: Kan'ei 6 (寛永６年)
- Javanese calendar: 1550–1551
- Julian calendar: Gregorian minus 10 days
- Korean calendar: 3962
- Minguo calendar: 283 before ROC 民前283年
- Nanakshahi calendar: 161
- Thai solar calendar: 2171–2172
- Tibetan calendar: ས་ཕོ་འབྲུག་ལོ་ (male Earth-Dragon); 1755 or 1374 or 602 — to — ས་མོ་སྦྲུལ་ལོ་ (female Earth-Snake); 1756 or 1375 or 603

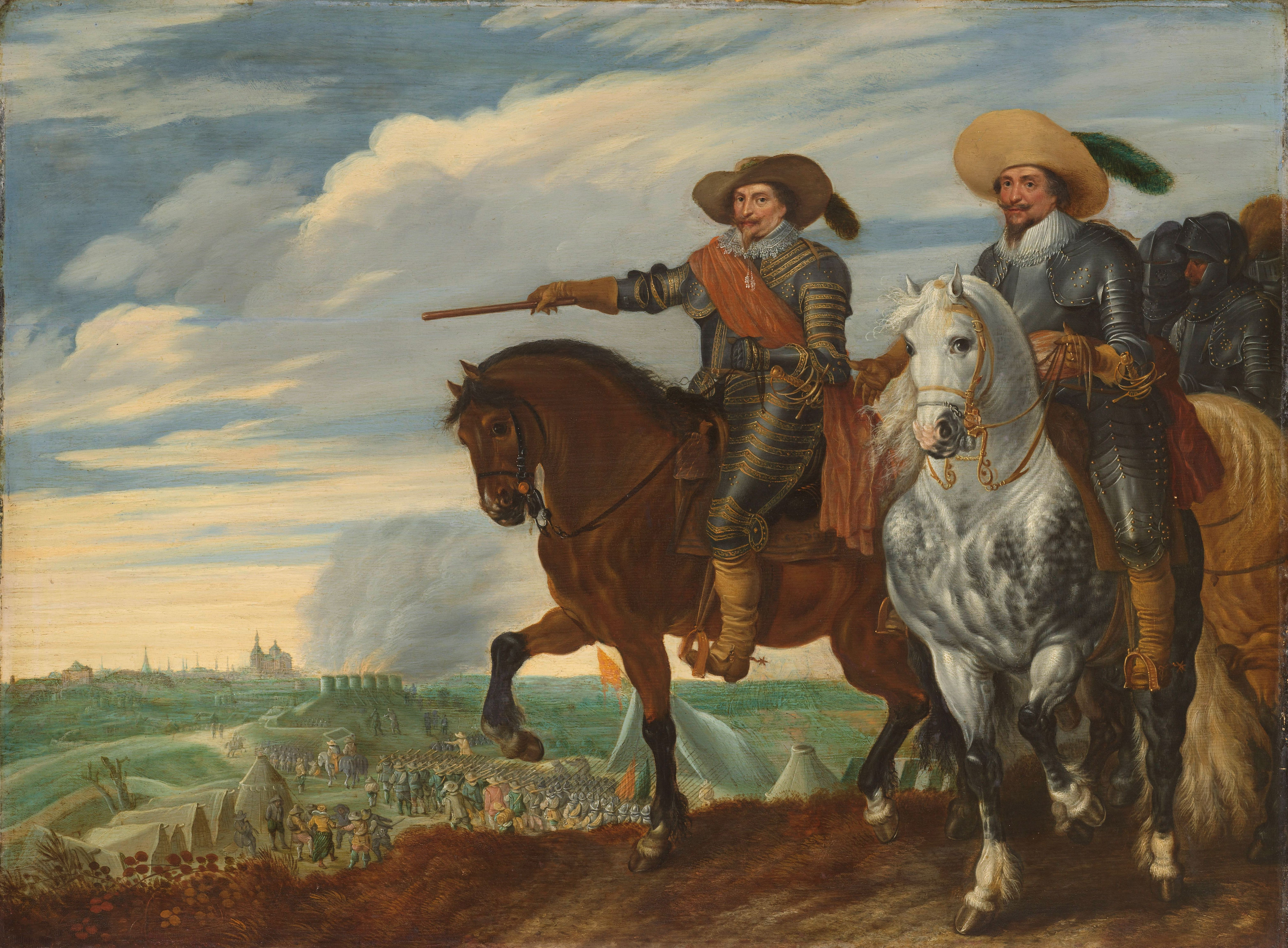
April 30: Frederick Henry and his cousin Ernst Casimir of the Netherlands succeed in the Siege of 's-Hertogenbosch.

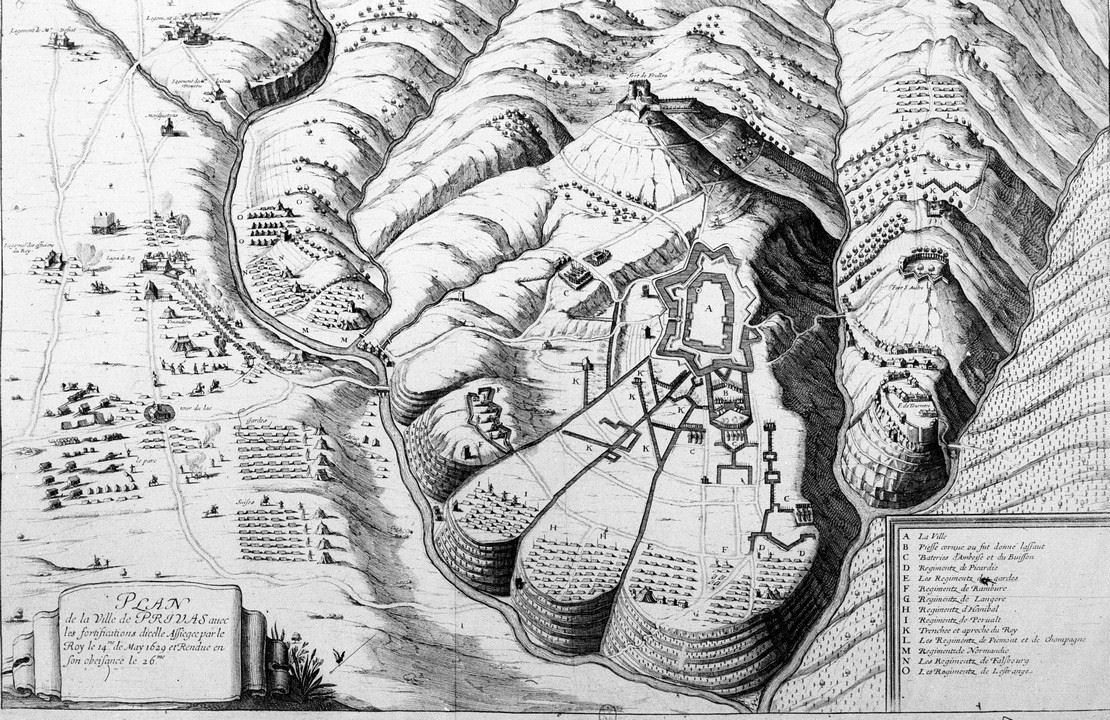
May 28: The siege of Privas ends after 15 days as King Louis XIII suppresses the Huguenot rebellion.

1629 (MDCXXIX) was a common year starting on Monday of the Gregorian calendar and a common year starting on Thursday of the Julian calendar, the 1629th year of the Common Era (CE) and Anno Domini (AD) designations, the 629th year of the 2nd millennium, the 29th year of the 17th century, and the 10th and last year of the 1620s decade. As of the start of 1629, the Gregorian calendar was 10 days ahead of the Julian calendar, which remained in localized use until 1923.

== Events ==
=== January–March ===
- January 8 – Frederick Henry, Hereditary Prince of the Palatinate, the 15-year-old son of the German Palatinate elector, Frederick V, drowns in an accident while sailing to Amsterdam.
- January 19 – Abbas the Great, one of the greatest rulers in Iranian history and the most powerful of the Safavid dynasty Shahs, dies after a reign of more than 40 years.
- January 28 – Sam Mirza, son of the late Mohammad Baqer Mirza and grandson of Abbas the Great, is crowned as the new Shah of Persia and takes the regnal name Safi.
- February 11 – Puritan migration to New England (1620–1640): Around 350 English Puritans on six ships, led by Francis Higginson in the Lyon's Whelp, sail from Yarmouth, Isle of Wight, heading to the Massachusetts Bay Colony in America. They arrive on June 19.
- March 4 – Massachusetts Bay Colony is granted a royal charter, and the colony is the first to be created in what will become the United States 150 years later, covering almost all of what will be the U.S. state of Massachusetts.
- March 6 – Ferdinand II, Holy Roman Emperor issues the Edict of Restitution, ordering all Catholic properties lost to Protestantism since 1552 to be restored. The Edict further provides that Catholics and Lutherans (but not Calvinists, Hussites or members of other sects) are to be allowed to practice their faith.
- March 10 – Charles I of England dissolves Parliament, starting the Eleven Years' Tyranny

=== April–June ===
- April 30 – Eighty Years' War: Frederick Henry, Prince of Orange lays siege to 's-Hertogenbosch, one of Spain's most important fortresses along the Spanish–Dutch border.
- May 14–28 – Huguenot rebellions: After a 15-day siege, Louis XIII of France captures Privas.
- May 22 – Thirty Years' War: Christian IV of Denmark and Albrecht von Wallenstein sign the Treaty of Lübeck, ending Denmark's involvement in the Thirty Years' War.
- May 29 – Thirty Years' War: Prince Frederick of Denmark, the Lutheran administrator of the Prince-Bishopric of Verden, is expelled by the Catholic League as a result of the Edict of Restitution. He is replaced by the staunch catholic Francis of Wartenberg.
- June 4 – The Dutch East India Company ship Batavia is wrecked on a reef near Beacon Island, off Western Australia, on her maiden voyage to the Indies. Following mutiny among the survivors, two exiled murderers become the first Europeans to settle in Australia. Their subsequent fate is unknown.
- June 7 – The Dutch States-General ratifies the Dutch West India Company's Charter of Freedoms and Exemptions, making it more attractive to invest in the colony of New Netherland in North America.
- June 17
  - Huguenot rebellions: Alès surrenders after an intense siege. As a result, the leader of the Huguenot Rebellions, the Duke of Rohan, surrenders.
  - Anglo-Spanish War (1625–1630): A Spanish expedition, led by Fadrique de Toledo, wipes out the English colony on Nevis.
- June 19 – Puritan migration to New England (1620–1640): The six ships of Puritans, led by Francis Higginson in the Lyon's Whelp, arrive in America at Salem, to settle in the Massachusetts Bay Colony.
- June 28 – Huguenot rebellions: Louis XIII of France signs in his camp at Lédignan the Peace of Alès, ending the Huguenot rebellions. The Huguenots are allowed religious freedom, but lose their political, territorial and military rights.

=== July–September ===
- July 19 – Anglo-French War (1627–1629): New France's Samuel de Champlain surrenders the city of Quebec to an English force led by David Kirke.
- July 20 – In Morocco, the city of Salé is bombarded by French Admiral Isaac de Razilly with a fleet composed of the ships Licorne, Saint-Louis, Griffon, Catherine, Hambourg, Sainte-Anne, Saint-Jean; his forces destroyed three corsair ships
- July 24 – Later Jin invasion of Joseon: In the Kingdom of Joseon (now Korea), Mao Wenlong is executed for smuggling and other crimes after being captured by Ming Chinese general Yuan Chonghuan.
- August 19 – Eighty Years' War: The Spanish garrison of Wesel is surprised by a small Dutch army, and the city is taken by the Dutch Republic. As Wesel functioned as the principal supply base of Hendrik van den Bergh's army, the loss of supply forces him to retreat to the Spanish Netherlands, leaving him unable to intervene in the ongoing siege of 's-Hertogenbosch.
- August 21 – Huguenot rebellions: Montauban, one of the last Huguenot strongholds, surrenders without a fight to Richelieu's troops.
- August 26 – The Cambridge Agreement is signed in the Massachusetts Bay Colony in America, providing for the colony to be under the control of stockholders who actually emigrate to New England.
- August 29 – As a result of the Cambridge Agreement, the Massachusetts Bay Colony becomes a self-governing entity.
- September 7 – Anglo-Spanish War (1625–1630): A Spanish expedition, led by Fadrique de Toledo, wipes out the English colony on St. Kitts.
- September 14 – Eighty Years' War: After a five-month-long siege, 's-Hertogenbosch surrenders to Frederick Henry. As a result of the capture of this key fortress, Spain's situation along the Spanish–Dutch border worsens greatly.
- September 20 – 1629–1631 Italian plague: the plague arrives in the nation-state of Milan as German soldiers are granted a stay at the Forte di Fuentes.
- September 22 – (5 Safar 1039 AH) Ahmad ibn Abd al-Muttalib, who had become Emir of Mecca and King of the Hejaz by force 16 months earlier, is assassinated by order of Kansuh Pasha, Governor of Yemen.
- September 25 – Polish–Swedish War (1626–1629): Sweden and the Polish–Lithuanian Commonwealth sign the Truce of Altmark, ending the war in highly favourable terms for Sweden.

=== October–December ===
- October 2 – In what is now the state of Western Australia, administered at the time by the Dutch East India Company, seven members of the crew of the Batavia are hanged on the Abrolhos Islands for their massacre of 125 passengers and crew.
- October 24 – Portuguese Navy Captain Pedro Teixeira leads 2,000 men in the capture of Fort Taurege from England in what is now Brazil.
- November 30 – The St Etienne baronets British nobility title is created.
- December 22 – (Kan'ei 6, 8th day of the 11th month) Emperor Go-Mizunoo of Japan abdicates the throne in favor of his daughter, Princess Okiko, who becomes Empress Meishō.
- December 23 – Giovanni I Cornaro, Doge of the Republic of Venice since 1625, dies and is succeeded by Nicolò Contarini.

=== Undated ===
- Fort Santo Domingo is built in Formosa by the Spanish East Indies.
- Chongzhen, the Chinese emperor of the Ming dynasty, reiterates the state prohibition against female infanticide, while the empire and the Chinese economy begins to crumble. In the same year, a third of the courier stations are closed down due to lack of government funds to sustain them.
- The rule of Nzinga of Ndongo and Matamba ends.
- Actresses are banned in Japan.
- William Alexander, 1st Earl of Stirling briefly establishes a Scottish colony at Port Royal, Nova Scotia.
- New Hampshire is established as a British colony.

== Births ==
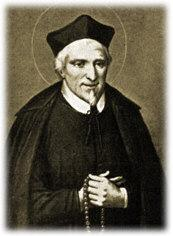
Sebastian Valfrè

Christiaan Huygens

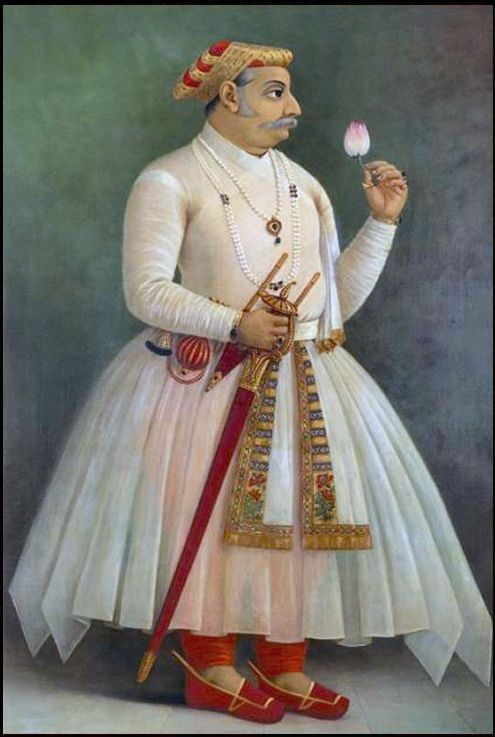
Raj Singh I

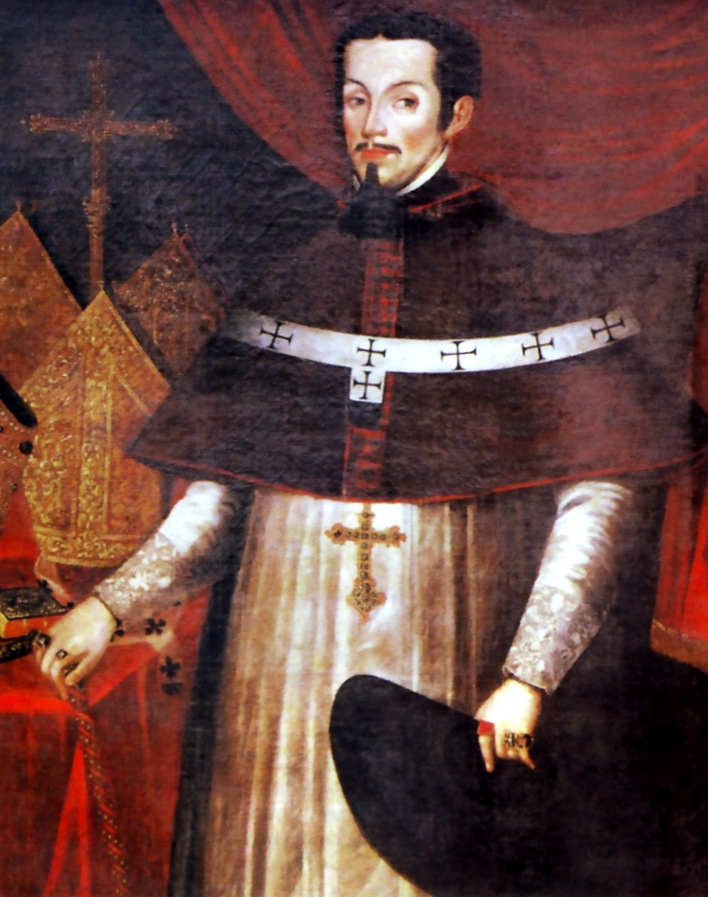
Melchor Liñán y Cisneros

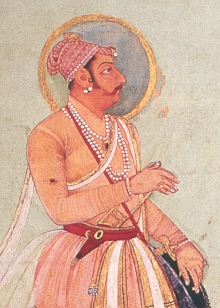
Jaswant Singh of Marwar

=== January–March ===
- January 2 – Christian Scriver, German hymnwriter (d. 1693)
- January 8 – Sir William Hickman, 2nd Baronet, Member of the House of Commons of England (d. 1682)
- January 13 – Lelio Colista, Italian composer and lutenist (d. 1680)
- January 16 – Theodorick Bland of Westover, American politician (d. 1671)
- January 23 – Adolph, Prince of Nassau-Schaumburg and Count of Nassau-Schaumburg (1653–1676) (d. 1676)
- February 5 – Henry Muddiman, English journalist and publisher (d. 1692)
- February 16 – Gert Miltzow, Norwegian clergyman and historical writer (d. 1688)
- February 25 – Francis Erdmann, Duke of Saxe-Lauenburg, Germany (d. 1666)
- February 26
  - Archibald Campbell, 9th Earl of Argyll, Scottish peer (d. 1685)
  - Iver Leganger, Norwegian priest, non-fiction writer (d. 1702)
- March 1 – Abraham Teniers, Flemish painter (d. 1670)
- March 5 – Philip Howard, English politician (d. 1711)
- March 8 – Johannes Caioni, Transylvanian Franciscan friar (d. 1687)
- March 9 – Sebastian Valfrè, Italian Oratorian priest (d. 1710)
- March 10 – Metcalfe Robinson, English politician (d. 1689)
- March 29 – Tsar Alexis of Russia (d. 1676)

=== April–June ===
- April 1 – Jean-Henri d'Anglebert, French harpsichordist and composer (d. 1691)
- April 7 – John Joseph of Austria, Spanish general (d. 1679)
- April 14 – Christiaan Huygens, Dutch scientist (d. 1695)
- April 23 – Jan Commelin, Dutch botanist (d. 1692)
- May 8 – Niels Juel, Danish admiral (d. 1697)
- May 23 – William VI, Landgrave of Hesse-Kassel (1637–1663) (d. 1663)
- June 5 – George Mason I, American politician (d. 1686)

=== July–September ===
- July 2 – Elizabeth Claypole, daughter of Oliver Cromwell (d. 1658)
- July 26 – John Ferrers, English politician (d. 1680)
- July 27 – Princess Luisa Cristina of Savoy, Princess of Savoy (d. 1692)
- August 6 – Thomas Walcot, British judge (d. 1685)
- August 10 – Agostino Scilla, Italian painter and scientist (d. 1700)
- August 12 – Archduchess Isabella Clara of Austria, Austrian archduchess (d. 1685)
- August 17 – King John III Sobieski, of Poland (d. 1696)
- August 18 – Agneta Horn, Swedish writer (d. 1672)
- August 20 – Matthew Wren, English politician (d. 1672)
- August 31 – Anna Margaret of Hesse-Homburg, Duchess consort of Schleswig-Holstein-Sonderburg-Wiesenburg (d. 1686)
- September 1 – Dorothea Elisabeth Christiansdatter, daughter of king Christian IV of Denmark (d. 1687)
- September 3
  - Lady Mary Dering, English composer (d. 1704)
  - Cornelis Tromp, Dutch naval officer (d. 1691)
- September 4 – Lorenzo Pasinelli, Italian painter (d. 1700)
- September 10 – John Heydon, English Neoplatonist occult philosopher (d. 1667)
- September 17 – Sir John Perceval, 1st Baronet, Anglo-Irish nobleman (d. 1665)
- September 21 – Philip Howard, English Roman Catholic Cardinal (d. 1694)
- September 24 – Raj Singh I, Maharaja of Mewar (d. 1680)

=== October–December ===
- October 3
  - Charles II, Duke of Mantua and Montferrat, son of Charles of Gonzaga-Nevers of Rethel (d. 1665)
  - Armand Jean de Vignerot du Plessis, French duke (d. 1715)
- October 7 – George Ernest, Count of Erbach-Wildenstein, Count of Erbach and Wildenstein (1647–1669) (d. 1669)
- October 10 – Richard Towneley, English mathematician and astronomer from Towneley near Burnley (d. 1707)
- October 11 – Armand de Bourbon, Prince of Conti, Frondeur (d. 1666)
- October 17 – Balthasar Charles, Prince of Asturias (d. 1646)
- October 18 – Lodewijk Meyer, Dutch physician and scholar (d. 1681)
- October 21 – Adolph John I, Count Palatine of Kleeburg, Swedish prince (d. 1689)
- October 28 – Maria van Riebeeck, South African settler (d. 1664)
- October 29 – Agnes Block, Dutch horticulturalist (d. 1704)
- November 1 – Oliver Plunkett, Irish saint (d. 1681)
- November 11 – Lodewijck van Ludick, painter from the Northern Netherlands (d. 1724)
- November 20 – Ernest Augustus, Elector of Brunswick-Lüneburg (d. 1698)
- December 2 – Wilhelm Egon von Fürstenberg, German Catholic cardinal (d. 1704)
- December 7 – Ezekiel, Freiherr von Spanheim, Swiss diplomat (d. 1710)
- December 11 – Sir Baynham Throckmorton, 3rd Baronet, English Member of Parliament (d. 1681)
- December 12 – Symeon of Polotsk, Belarusian churchman and poet (d. 1680)
- December 16 – Ahasverus Fritsch, German jurist, poet and hymn writer (d. 1701)
- December 19 – Melchor Liñán y Cisneros, Spanish Catholic archbishop (d. 1708)
- December 20 – Pieter de Hooch, Dutch painter (d. 1684)
- December 23 – Paul Rycaut, British diplomat (d. 1700)
- December 26 – Jaswant Singh of Marwar, ruler of Marwar in the present-day Indian state of Rajasthan (d. 1678)

=== Date unknown ===
- Katherine Austen, English diarist and poet (d. c. 1683)
- Ruaidhrí Ó Flaithbheartaigh (Roderick O'Flaherty), Irish chieftain and historian (d. 1718)

== Deaths ==
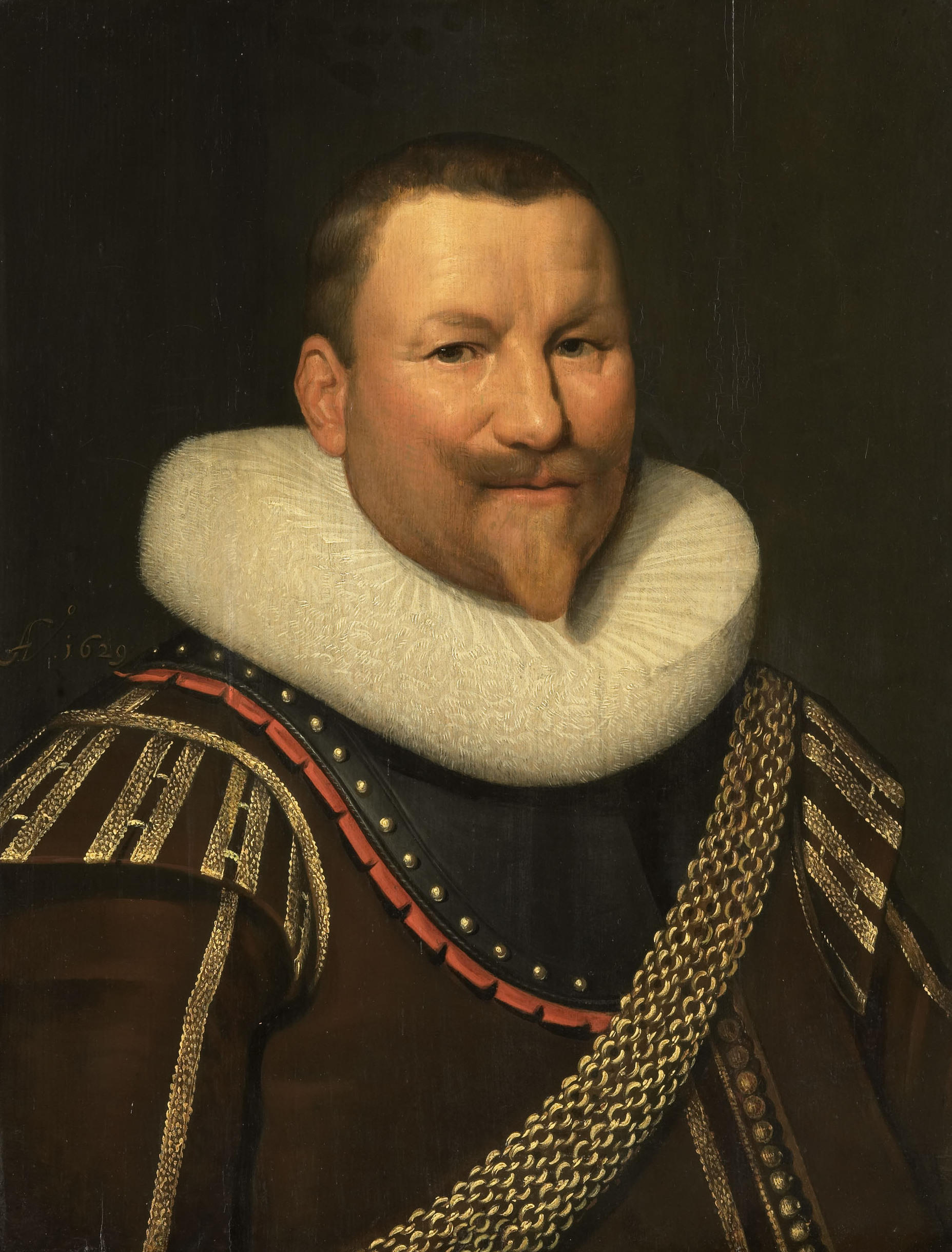
Piet Hein

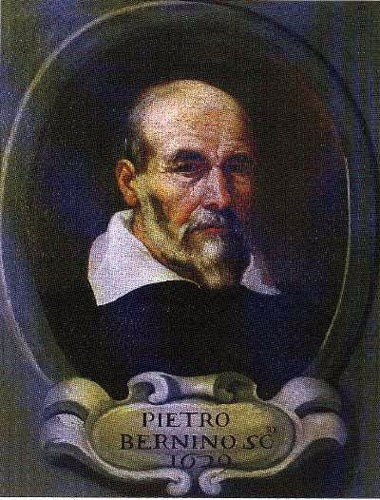
Pietro Bernini

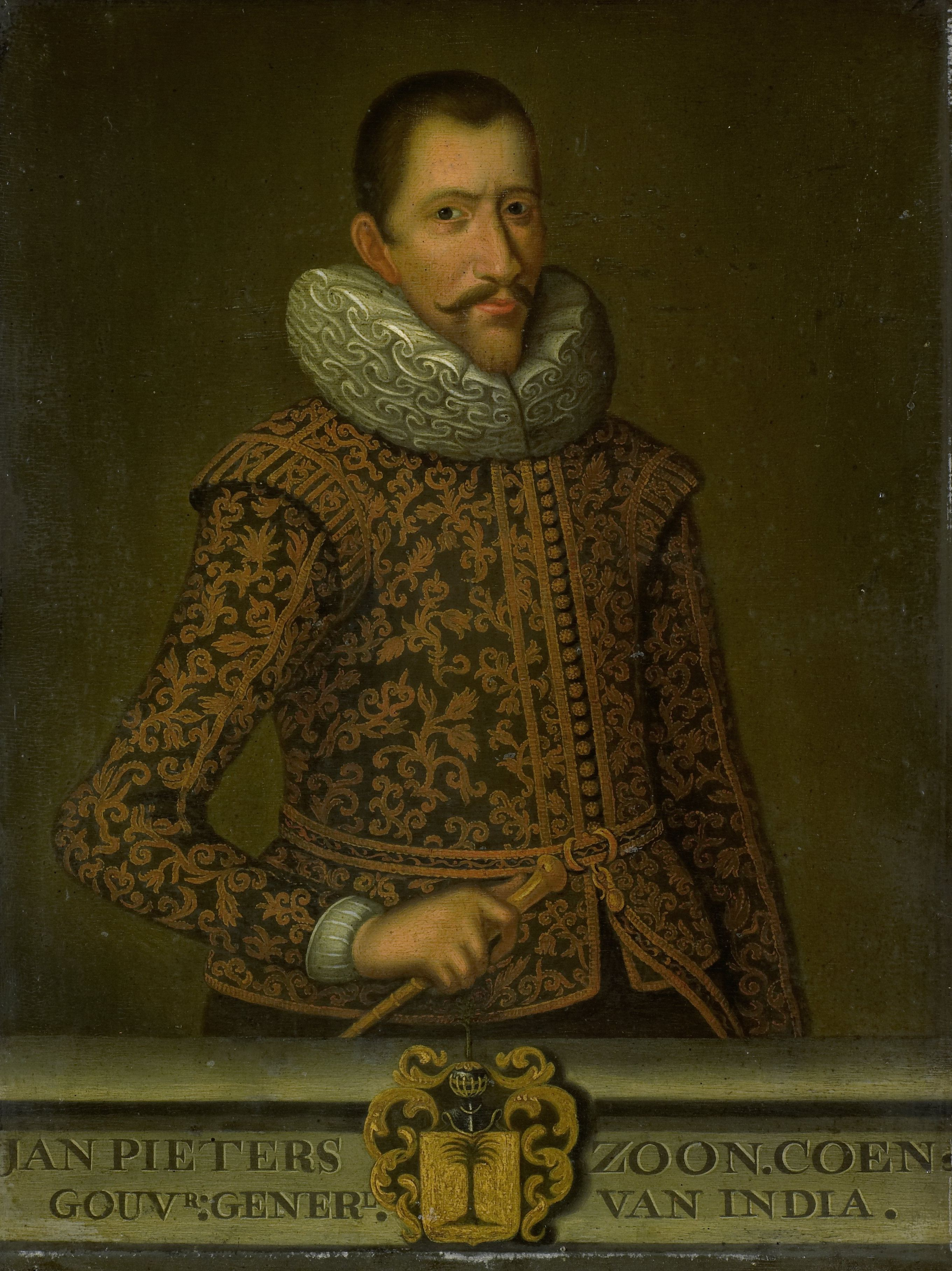
Jan Pieterszoon Coen

- January 7 – Frederick Henry, Hereditary Prince of the Palatinate (b. 1614)
- January 13 – Sri Chand, founder of the ascetic sect of Udasi (b. 1494)
- January 19 – Abbas the Great, 5th Safavid Shāh of Persia (b. 1571)
- January 23 – Andreas Schott, Flemish philologist, academic, linguist and Jesuit priest (b. 1552)
- January 27 – Hieronymus Praetorius, German composer (b. 1560)
- March 16 – Countess Emilia of Nassau, Dutch noble, daughter of William the Silent (b. 1559)
- March 23 – Francis Fane, 1st Earl of Westmorland, English politician (b. c. 1580)
- March 25 – John Guy, English merchant venturer and first Governor of Newfoundland (b. 1568)
- March 26 – Agnes of Brandenburg, Duchess of Pomerania, later Duchess of Saxe-Lauenburg (b. 1584)
- March 27 – George Carew, 1st Earl of Totnes, English noble, general and administrator (b. 1555)
- March 29 – Jacob de Gheyn II, Dutch painter and engraver (b. c. 1585)
- April 8 – Willem Teellinck, Dutch pastor (b. 1579)
- April 17 – Catherine de' Medici, Governor of Siena, Italian princess (b. 1593)
- May 5 – Szymon Szymonowic, Polish writer (b. 1558)
- May 19 – Petrus Ryff, Swiss scientist (b. 1552)
- May 30 – Thomas Schreiber, German innkeeper and alleged witch (b. c. 1598)
- June 18 – Piet Pieterszoon Hein, Dutch naval officer (b. 1577)
- July 6 – Georg Friedrich von Greiffenklau, Archbishop of Mainz (b. 1573)
- July 13 – Caspar Bartholin the Elder, Swedish physician and theologian (b. 1585)
- August 18 – Vendela Skytte, Swedish noble (b. 1608)
- August 29 – Pietro Bernini, Italian sculptor (b. 1562)
- September 11 – Herman Hugo, Dutch Jesuit priest, writer, military chaplain (b. 1588)
- September 13 – Johannes Buxtorf, German Calvinist theologian (b. 1564)
- September 21 – Jan Pieterszoon Coen, Governor-General of the Dutch East Indies (b. 1587)
- September 22 – Robert Radclyffe, 5th Earl of Sussex, English noble (b. 1573)
- October 2
  - Pierre de Bérulle, French cardinal and statesman (b. 1575)
  - Antonio Cifra, Italian composer (b. 1584)
- October 3 – Giorgi Saakadze, Georgian military commander (b. 1570)
- October 5 – Heribert Rosweyde, Dutch Jesuit hagiographer (b. 1569)
- October 13 – Petrus Bertius, Flemish theologian and scientist (b. 1565)
- November – Hendrick ter Brugghen, Dutch painter (b. c. 1558)
- November 9 – Sixtinus Amama, Dutch Reformed theologian and orientalist (b. 1593)
- December 13 – Mikołaj Oleśnicki the younger, Polish noble (b. 1558)
- December 23 – Giovanni I Cornaro, Doge of Venice (b. 1551)
- date unknown – Antonio Vassilacchi ("Il Aliense"), Greek Venetian painter (b. 1556)
- probable – Sigismondo d'India, Italian composer (b. c. 1582)
