= 1620s in piracy =

This timeline of the history of piracy in the 1620s is a chronological list of key events involving pirates between 1620 and 1629.

== Events ==
=== 1620 ===
- Unknown - Jans Janszoon, also known as Murat Reis the Younger, a Dutch Barbary Pirate, converts to Islam.

=== 1621 ===
- January 6 - Roger North is imprisoned in the Tower of London.
- July 18 - Roger North is released from the Tower of London.
- Late October - The 120-ton Jacob of Bristol was attacked and captured in the Strait of Gibraltar by Algerian corsairs.
- Mid-November - The Nicholas and the George Bonaventure, two small English merchantmen, were attacked and captured near the Strait of Gibraltar.

=== 1622 ===
- December 26 - The Jacob is, again, attacked near the Strait of Gibraltar and sunk.

=== 1625 ===
- Zheng Zhilong founds Shibazhi, an organization of Chinese pirates.

=== 1626 ===
- Unknown - Cornelius Jol joins the Dutch West India Company and becomes an admiral.

=== 1627 ===
- During the 14 days between the 4th and the 19th of July - Murat Reis the Younger raided both Eastern Region and Vestmannaeyjar in Iceland. The raid on Vestmannaeyjar is called The Turkish abductions.
- Unknown - Murat Reis the Younger captures the island of Lundy in the Bristol Channel and holds it for five years.

=== 1628 ===
- Unknown - Piet Pieterszoon Hein, with the help of Moses Cohen Henriques, capture the Spanish treasure fleet during a battle in the Bay of Mantanzas in Cuba during the Eighty Years' War.
- Unknown - Zheng Zhilong defeats the Ming Dynasty's fleet then begins working for them and is appointed major general.

== Births ==
=== 1620 ===
- Unknown - John Murphy Fitzgerald, also known as Juan Morfa

=== 1628 ===
- Unknown - John Aylett

=== 1629 ===
- Unknown - Daniel Johnson

== Deaths ==
=== 1620 ===
- October 10 - Sulayman Reis

=== 1622 ===
- April 17 - Richard Hawkins
- Summer - Jack Ward
- Unknown - Jan Jacobsen

=== 1627 ===
- February 22 - Olivier van Noort
- Unknown - Hendrick Jacobszoon Lucifer

=== 1628 ===
- August 18 - Piers Griffith

=== 1629 ===
- June 18 - Piet Pieterszoon Hein
