= Portuguese campaigns in the Amazon River of 1623–1625 =

Portuguese campaigns of 1623–1625
- Part of the Dutch invasions of Brazil and Portuguese conquest of the Amazon
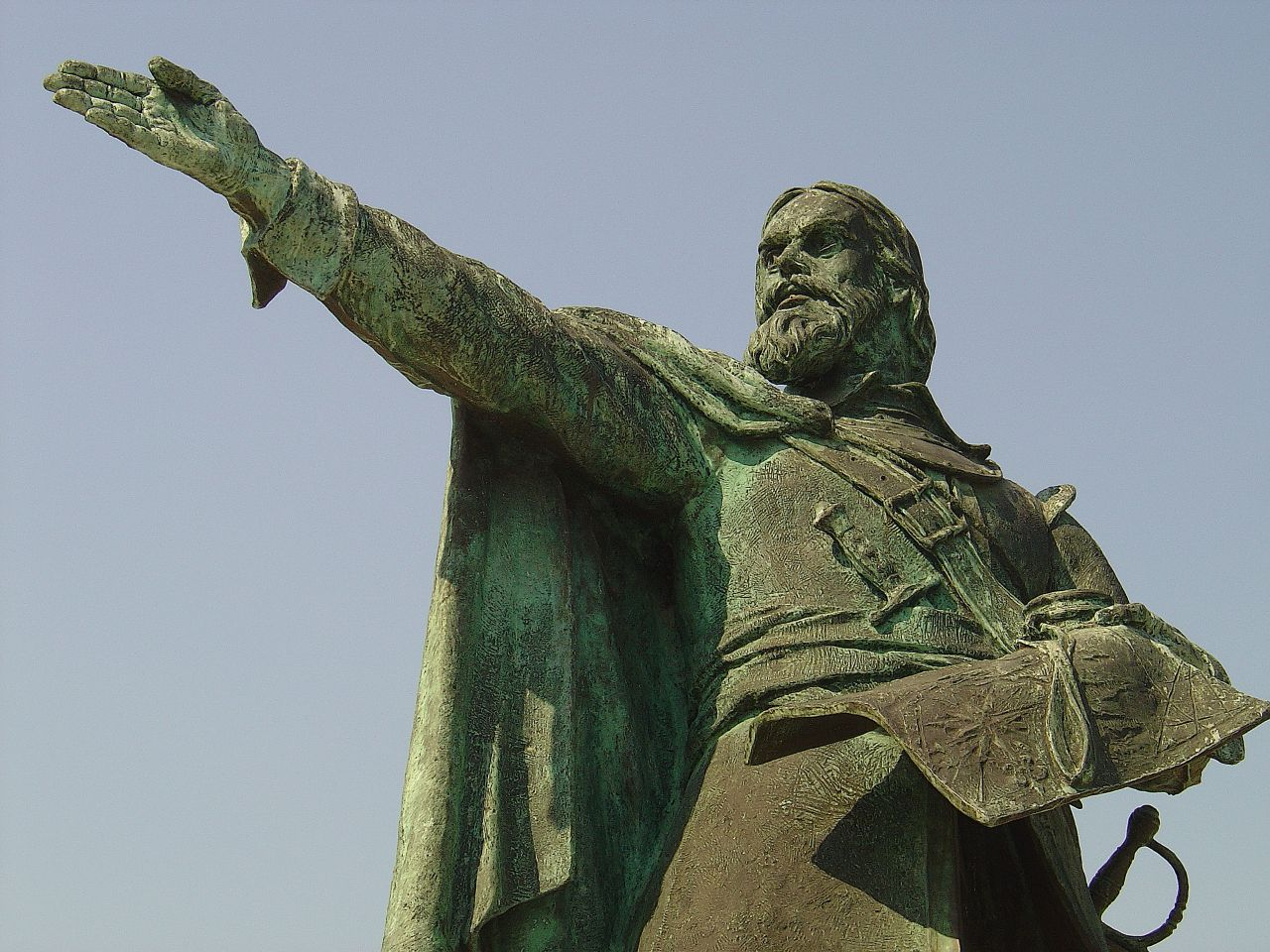
- Statue of Pedro Teixeira in Cantanhede
Date	1623–1625
Location	Gurupá, Xingu River
Result	Portuguese victory
Territorial changes	The Dutch and English are expelled from the Amazon

Belligerents
Portuguese Empire	Dutch West India Company; England

Commanders and leaders
(Portuguese Empire) Pedro Teixeira (Portuguese Empire) Luís Aranha de Vasconcelos (Portuguese Empire) Bento Maciel Parente	(Dutch West India Company) Pieter Jansz (Dutch West India Company) Nicolau Oudaen (England) Philip Purcell

Casualties and losses
- Estimated 15,000 indigenous killed

The Portuguese campaigns of 1623–1625 were a series of military expeditions organized by the Kingdom of Portugal to explore the Amazon River and expel Dutch, English, and other foreign factories established in the lower Amazon.

They include the campaigns of Luís Aranha de Vasconcelos and of Bento Maciel Parente.
