= Portuguese conquest of the Amazon =

- Part of the Portuguese colonization of the Americas
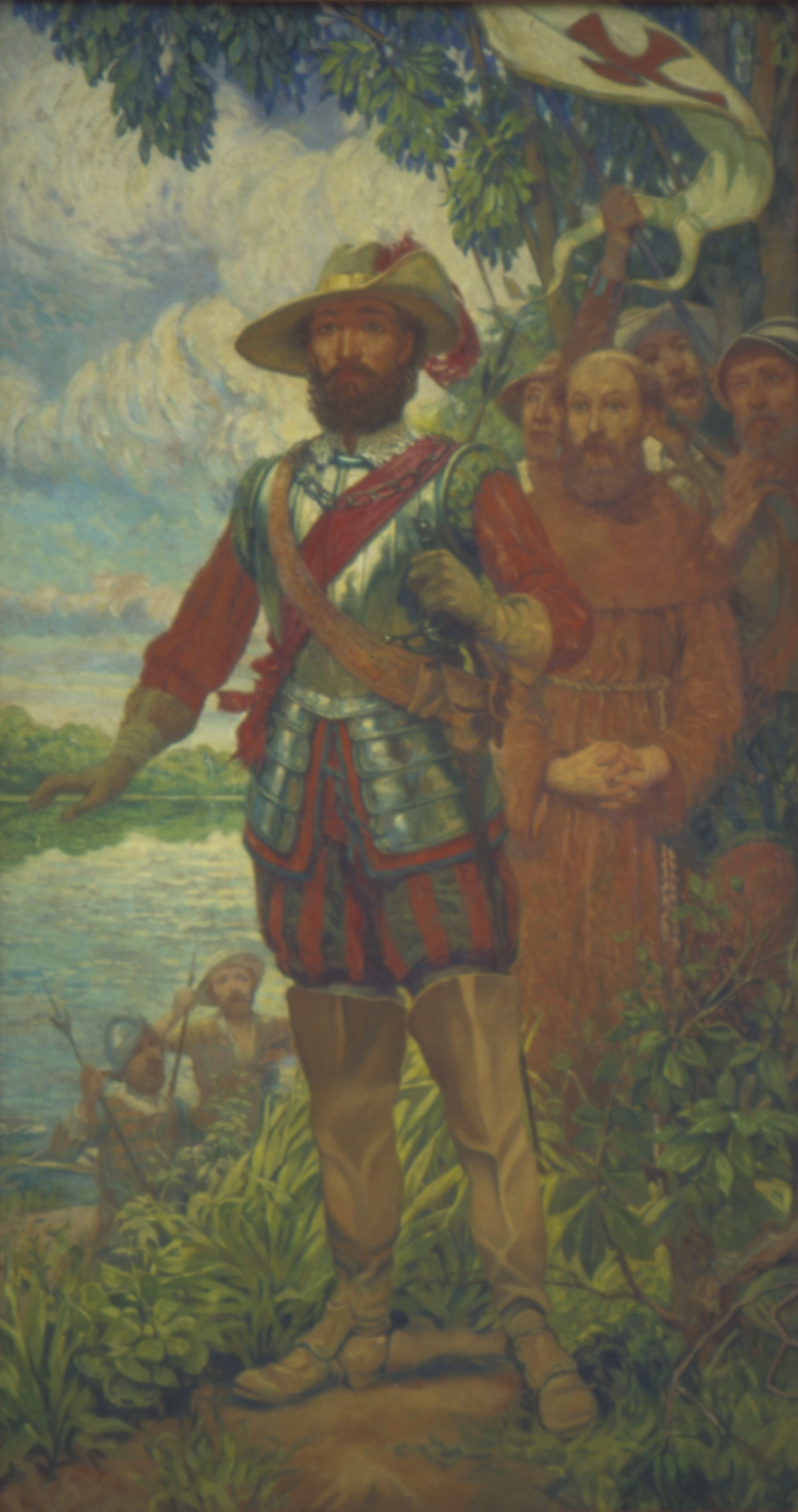
- "Possession of the Amazon" by Fernandes Machado, 1925
Date	16th—18th century
Location	Amazon River
Result	Portuguese victory

Belligerents
Portuguese Empire; Spanish Empire	Indigenous groups Dutch Republic; Kingdom of England; Kingdom of France; Kingdom of Ireland

The Portuguese conquest of the Amazon was the process by which the Portuguese established control over the Amazon basin from the 16th to 18th century.

The period was marked by violent confrontations as Portuguese forces expelled the English, French, Dutch and Irish who had arrived to establish trade and control territory by building permanent forts along the riverbanks.

== See also ==
- Portuguese Brazil
- Portuguese conquest of Maranhão
- Pedro Teixeira
- State of Grão-Pará and Rio Negro
- State of Grão-Pará and Maranhão
