= Robert Harcourt (explorer) =

English explorer

Robert Harcourt (1574?–1631) was an English explorer, projector of a South American colony, in what was later Guiana.

== Life ==
Born about 1574 at Ellenhall, Staffordshire, Harcourt was the eldest son of Sir Walter Harcourt, of Ellenhall and Stanton Harcourt, Oxfordshire, and his with the former Dorothy Robinson. Harcourt began his studies at Oxford University as a gentleman-commoner of St. Alban Hall on 10 April 1590 and stayed there about three years.

On 23 March 1609, accompanied by his brother Michael and a company of adventurers, Robert Harcourt sailed for Guiana. On 11 May, he arrived at the Oyapock River. Local people came on board, and were disappointed at the absence of Sir Walter Raleigh after he had visited during his exploration of the area in 1595. Harcourt gave them aqua vitae. He claimed in the king's name of a tract of land lying between the River Amazon and River Essequibo on 14 August, left his brother and most of his company to colonise it, and four days later embarked for England.

At this time, Harcourt was involved in a dispute with his brother-in-law, Anthony Fitzherbert, about his claim to the manor of Norbury, Derbyshire. He also appears to have been a target for penalties for Catholicism: on 8 November 1609 one Robert Campbell obtained a grant of the benefit of his recusancy. He ultimately obtained letters patent empowering him to plant and inhabit the land at Guiana, but was prevented from ever visiting it again.

King James I renewed the grant to Harcourt on 28 August 1613. The grant specified that Harcourt's heirs, Sir Thomas Challoner and John Rovenson, would be holders after him. To try promote the success of his plans for settlement in Guiana, Harcourt wrote an account of his adventures. A corporation of "lords and gentlemen" was formed and entrusted the conduct of the enterprise to Roger North. North, despite the opposition of Gondomar, the Spanish ambassador, transported a hundred English settlers to Guiana (Oyapoc). He then obtained on 30 January 1626 a grant for incorporating his own and Harcourt's company with all customary privileges. The following April, Harcourt issued a Proposal for the formation of a Company of Adventurers to the river Amazon, and an enlarged edition of his book, with the conditions laid down by him for settlers in Guiana. Harcourt lost heavily on the speculation, and had to sell Ellenhall as well as his property at Wytham in Berkshire.

Harcourt died on 20 May 1631, aged about 57, and was buried at Stanton Harcourt.

== Family ==
Harcourt married, first, Elizabeth, daughter of John Fitzherbert of Norbury, Derbyshire, by whom he had no issue; and secondly, Frances, daughter of Geoffrey Vere, fourth son of John de Vere, 15th Earl of Oxford, who gave him a family of seven children. Sir Simon Harcourt was his eldest son. Vere Harcourt his third son became Archdeacon of Nottingham.
