= Oyapoc =

Oyapoc (or Wiapoco) was a short-lived English settlement in French Guiana on the Oyapock (or Wiapoco) river. Charles Leigh had visited the area in 1602, and considered it suitable for a colony. On returning, he assembled a crew of 46 people and embarked on the Olive Plant. The settlers planned to look for gold in the area. They set sail on 21 March 1604, and arrived in Oyapoc on 22 May 1604 taking possession of the country "in the eyes of the Indians." Leigh gave the name Caroleigh River to the Wiapoco. He dubbed the settlement Oliveleighe, and the principal site for settlement was called Principium or Mount Howard. The Olive Plant was sent back, and thirty-five men and boys remained at the settlement. Upon begging his brother, Sir Oleph, for reinforcements, The Olive Plant returned, renamed The Phoenix, to find the settlement in "a rather critical position." The settlers experienced mutiny, and a raid by Caribs from the Cayenne River. On 31 May 1606, the remaining settlers left on the Hope.

Robert Harcourt received license to travel in 1608, and arrived at the Wiapoco 17 May 1609, and claimed "the whole continent of Guiana" for King James, 14 August 1609. Harcourt left soon after, leaving his brother Michael in charge along with Edward Harvey and Edward Gifford. Harcourt made further explorations along the Guiana coast

In 1620, Roger North (who had been a part of Sir Walter Raleigh's last expedition to the Guianas) set to establish a colony with 120 men, encountering other English and Irish settlers from Haricourt's colony. North returned to England, and was imprisoned on arrival for embarking on the expedition against the order to return by King James. The remaining colonists were then governed by Captain Thomas Painton, who died soon after and was replaced by Captain Charles Parker who held the command for six years. Amerindian labor was used for building and agriculture work, paid for in glass beads or iron work. Most of the area was dominated by the Dutch with two colonies; they added a third in the mid-eighteenth century. The colony was forced to trade with the Dutch at a loss. Three of the colonists, Thomas Warner, John Rhodes, and Robert Bims moved on after two years to found St. Christopher, England's first English colony of the West Indies. By 1623, the river was abandoned.

In 1626, Harcourt and North joined to make a new Company, but differences of opinion split up the venture, and North sought locations further east. By 1629, the settlement had faded away, and Harcourt possibly died there.

Britain took over the region in 1796, during hostilities with France, which then occupied the Netherlands.

== Bibliography ==
- Williamson, James Alexander (1923). English colonies in Guiana and on the Amazon, 1604-1668. Oxford: Clarendon Press.
