= Daniel Johnson (pirate) =

17th-century English pirate

Daniel Johnson (c. 1629–1675) was an English buccaneer who, serving under buccaneers such as Moyse Van Vin and Pierre le Picard, sailed against the Spanish during the late 17th century, becoming known among the Spanish as "Johnson the Terror". There is little record of his career aside from a single body of work, Appleton's Cyclopædia of American Biography (1887), suggesting he may be a fictional character.

== Biography ==
Born in Bristol, England in 1629, Johnson served as a merchant sailor for several years until his ship was captured by a Spanish warship in 1654 and was taken to Santo Domingo where he would be held as a slave for more than three years until escaping to the French-held island of Tortuga. He swore to avenge himself for the cruel treatment he had received at the hands of the Spaniards, and he kept his word so well that he was named by the Spanish "Johnson the Terror". Reportedly embittered by his experience, he readily enlisted as a crew member under Dutch buccaneer Captain Moyse Van Vin that same year.

Johnson soon rose through the ranks and was soon promoted to chief, within two years, had become a lieutenant by 1659. However, they soon began to quarrel over the distribution of spoils, and eventually fought a duel in which Van Vin was seriously wounded.

Leaving Van Vin soon after, he signed with Pierre le Picard and later participated in Sir Henry Morgan's expedition against Maracaibo and Panama in 1661. Two years later, he began attacking Spanish shipping and coastal settlements in the Bay of Honduras, burning the city of Puerto Cabello after looting an estimated $1,500,000.

During the following year, commanding a 24-gun brig, he attacked a 56-gun Spanish galleon which had been carrying a shipment of gold from Guatemala to Spain and, despite being outmanned and outgunned, the 900-ton vessel surrendered to Johnson after an hour of fighting. Gaining a considerable amount of notoriety following the incident, Spanish authorities offered a reward of $25,000 for his capture (one of the largest bounties ever offered at the time).

In 1666, after joining other buccaneers in pillaging the coast of Venezuela, his ship sank near the western coast of Cuba on his return voyage to Tortuga and escaped with several others in an open boat.

After being informed of his presence in the area, the Spanish governor of Havana sent out a 15-gun brig to capture him. However, upon encountering the vessel, Johnson instead captured the Spanish brig after a fierce battle. With his crew far too small to guard the 200 captured prisoners, he supposedly had them murdered with their heads sent to the Havana governor.

After several years of evading Spanish authorities, he was finally captured by a small fleet of four Spanish men-of-war. Sustaining seventeen wounds during the battle, he was brought to Panama where he was nursed to health by physicians so he would be able to stand trial, and he was publicly hanged in the city square in 1675.
