= Lodewijck van Ludick =

Painter from the Northern Netherlands

Lodewijk van Ludick
- Born: 11 November 1629; Amsterdam
- Died: 22 December 1724 (aged 95); Amsterdam

Lodewijk van Ludick or Lodewijck van Ludick (11 November 1629 – buried 22 December 1724 ?) was a landscape painter from the Dutch Republic.

Ludick was born in Amsterdam as the son of a man of the same name who was not a painter, but was a friend of many painters, including Rembrandt. He is known for Italianate landscapes, sometimes copied from other painters, such as Jan Asselijn.

Painting by Rembrandt owned by Ludick

Ludick married in May 1657 to Cornelia Bosmans/Bosman. They baptized at least 11 children between 1658 and 1677, including two named Lodewijk in 1658 and 1659. Ludick died in Amsterdam, but the year of his death is uncertain. Several sources state that he died "before 1697", while persons with his name, both living on the Keizersgracht, are known to be buried in Amsterdam on 27 February 1723 and 22 December 1724.
