= St Etienne baronets =

Extinct baronetcy in the Baronetage of Nova Scotia

The St Etienne Baronetcy, of France, was a title in the Baronetage of Nova Scotia. It was created on 30 November 1629 for Claude St Etienne. The title is presumed to have become extinct on the death of the second Baronet in circa 1660.

== St Etienne baronets, of France (1629) ==
- Sir Claude St Etienne, 1st Baronet (died c. 1645)
- Sir Charles St Etienne, 2nd Baronet (died c. 1660)
