= Diego Sarmiento de Acuña, 1st Count of Gondomar =

Spanish diplomat (1567–1626)

Diego Sarmiento de Acuña
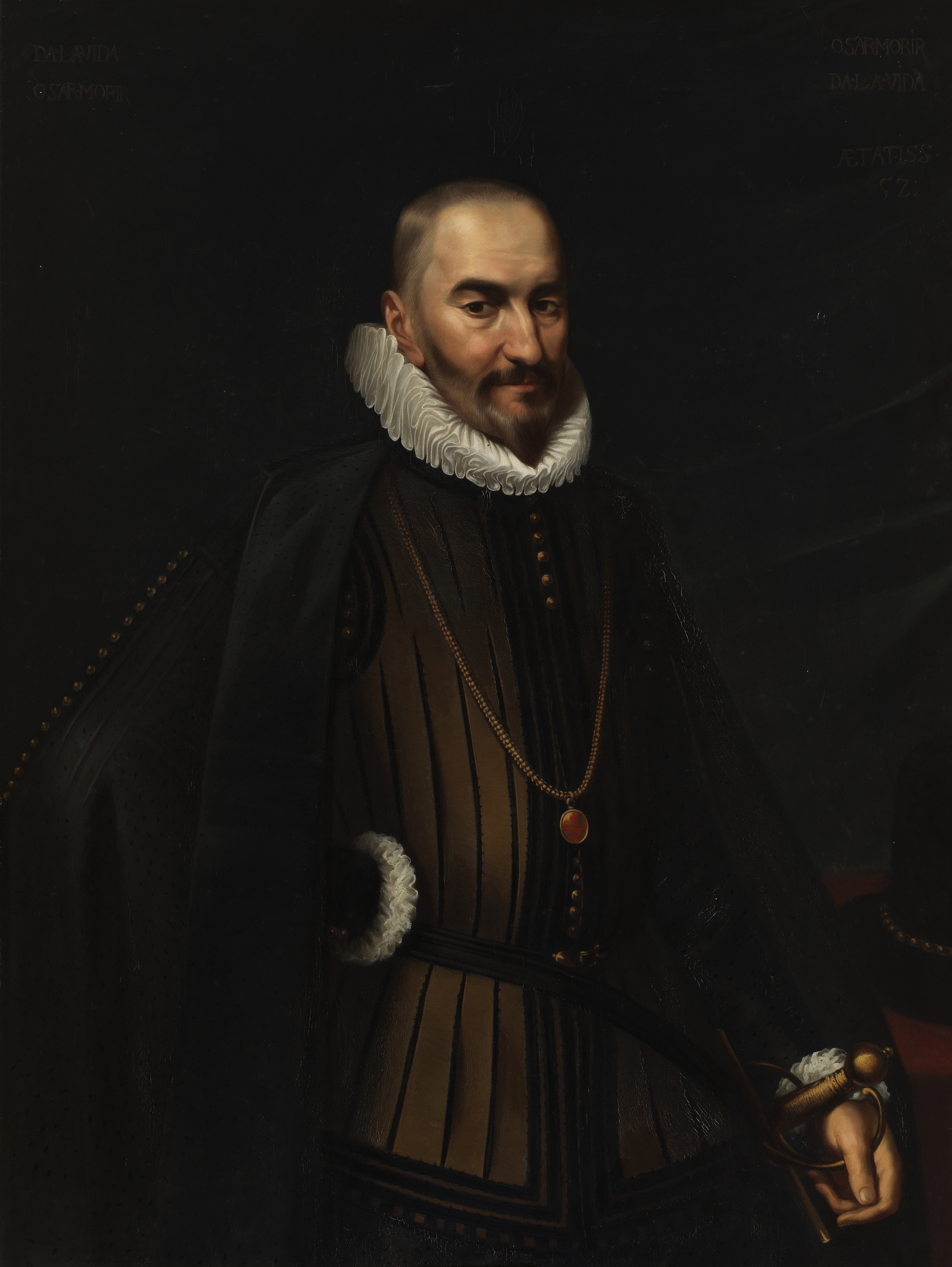
- Copy of portrait by José María Galván y Candela

Ambassador of Spain to England
- In office 1613–1618
- Monarch: Philip III of Spain
- Preceded by: Pedro de Zúñiga y de la Cueva
- In office 1620–1622
- Monarch: Philip IV of Spain
- Succeeded by: Juan de Mendoza y Velasco

Personal details
- Born: Diego de Sarmiento Acuña; November 1, 1567 Astorga, Castile
- Died: October 2, 1626 (aged 58) Casalarreina, Castile
- Spouse: Constanza de Acuña
- Parent: García Sarmiento de Sotomayor
- Profession: Diplomat, governor, commander, soldier

Diego Sarmiento de Acuña, 1st Count of Gondomar (November 1, 1567 – October 2, 1626), referred to simply as Count Gondomar, was a Spanish nobleman and diplomat. He twice served as Spain's ambassador to England and later held an informal but influential role as Spain's leading expert on English affairs, a position he maintained until his death.

In England, Gondomar was widely regarded as the leader of a Spanish faction at the English court, a confidant privy to the inner thoughts of King James I, and working to advance the Papist cause.

== Early life ==
Gondomar was born into a noble family on November 1, 1567, at the episcopal palace in Astorga, the residence of his paternal uncle. He was the eldest son of García Sarmiento de Sotomayor, Lord of Gondomar and Vincios, and Juana de Acuña, daughter of the Dukes of Valencia de Don Juan.

In 1579, García Sarmiento de Sotomayor created the lordship of Gondomar and Vincios, which Gondomar, as first-born inherited, upon his father's death later that very same year.

At the age of 14, Gondomar was married to his niece Beatriz Sarmiento y Mendoza, who died five years later while he was serving in Italy. Two years after her death, he married Constanza de Acuña, with whom he had eight children.

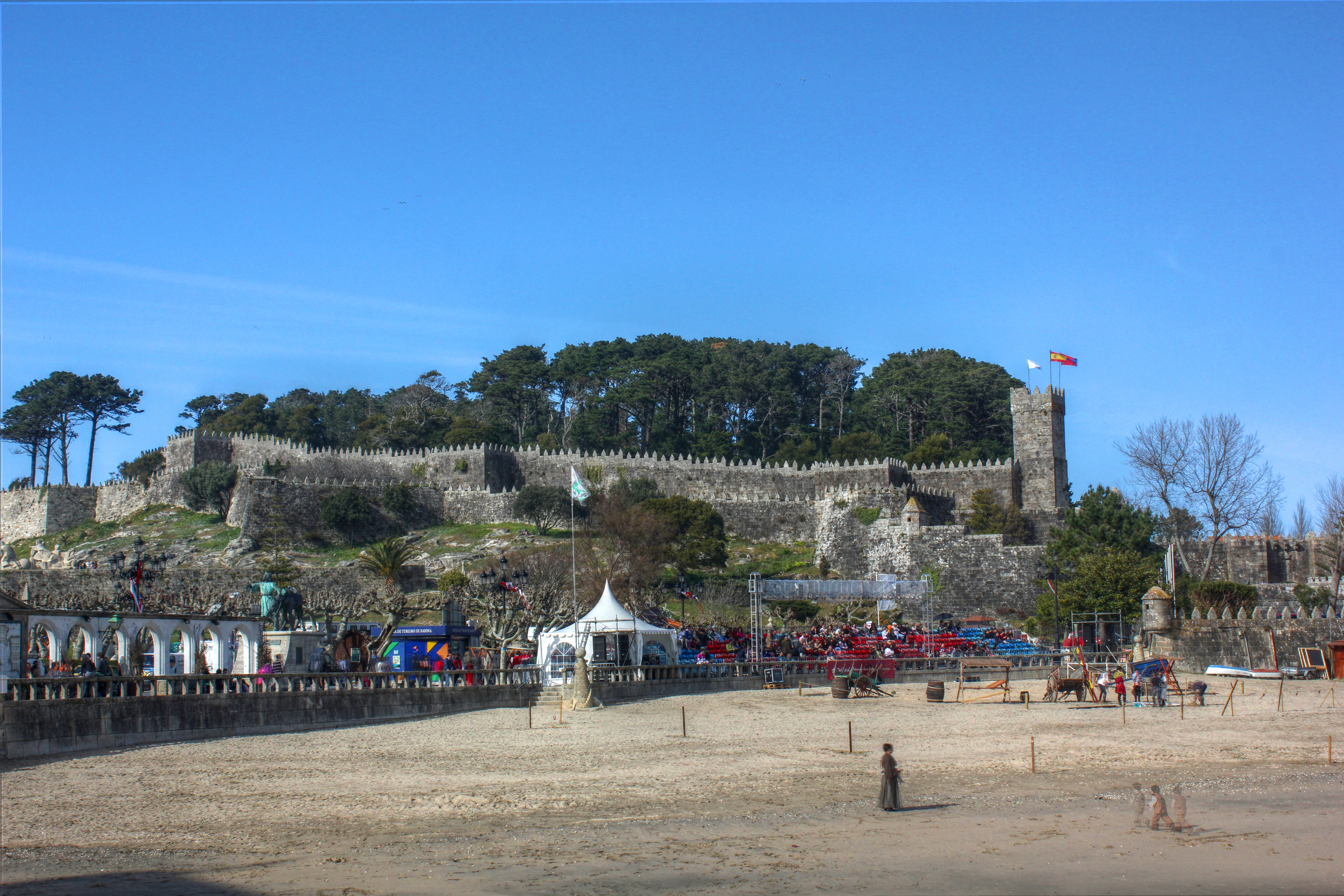
The fortress of Monte Real, Baiona

During the Anglo-Spanish War, Gondomar played a key role in defending the towns of Baiona and Vigo against an English raid led by Sir Francis Drake in 1585. Four years later, they clashed again in Vigo, after the English Armada was repelled in A Coruña and Lisbon; in the assault on A Coruña Drake was defeated but not before the bombing and sack of the town. Thanks to these military successes, King Philip II of Spain appointed Gondomar military governor of Baiona and the fortress of Monte Real, giving him responsibility for securing the southern border and coastline of Galicia.

In 1596, he was appointed first corregidor, or governor, of Toro, and later of Valladolid, then the residence and capital of King Philip III. From that moment he was forced to reconcile both roles, as courtier and corregidor in the capital, and as soldier and Capitan in Galicia: in 1603 he was sent from court to Vigo to oversee the distribution of the treasure brought from America by two galleons which were driven to take refuge there; on his return he was appointed a member of the board of finance. In 1609 he repelled a Dutch naval attack on the coast of Galicia.

Although he held both military and administrative employs, his residence was at Valladolid, where he owned the Casa del Sol estate and was already amassing his fine library. He was known as a courtier, and apparently as a friend of the favourite, the Duke of Lerma. In 1612 he was appointed ambassador in England, but he did not leave to take up his appointment until May 1613.

== Ambassadorship ==
Gondomar's reputation as a diplomat, which brought him to international historical prominence, is based on his two periods of service in England – from 1613 to 1618 and from 1619 to 1622. The excellence of his latinity pleased the literary tastes of King James I, whose character he judged with remarkable insight. He flattered the king's love of books and of peace, and he made skilful use of the king's desire for a matrimonial alliance between the Prince of Wales and the infanta Maria Anna of Spain (the proposed "Spanish Match"). The British historian J. P. Kenyon calls him "a cleverer man than any in England", who was gifted enough to tie England to Spain's interests for the next decade.

The ambassador's task in the prelude to the Thirty Years' War was to keep James from aiding the Protestant states against Spain and Habsburg Austria, and to avert English attacks on Spanish possessions in the Americas. His success made him odious to the anti-Spanish and Puritan parties. The active part he took in promoting the execution of Sir Walter Raleigh aroused particular animosity. He was attacked by popular pamphleteers — Thomas Scott's extravagant propaganda, Vox populi, was widely believed — and the dramatist Thomas Middleton made him a principal character in the strange political play A Game at Chess, which was suppressed by order of the council.

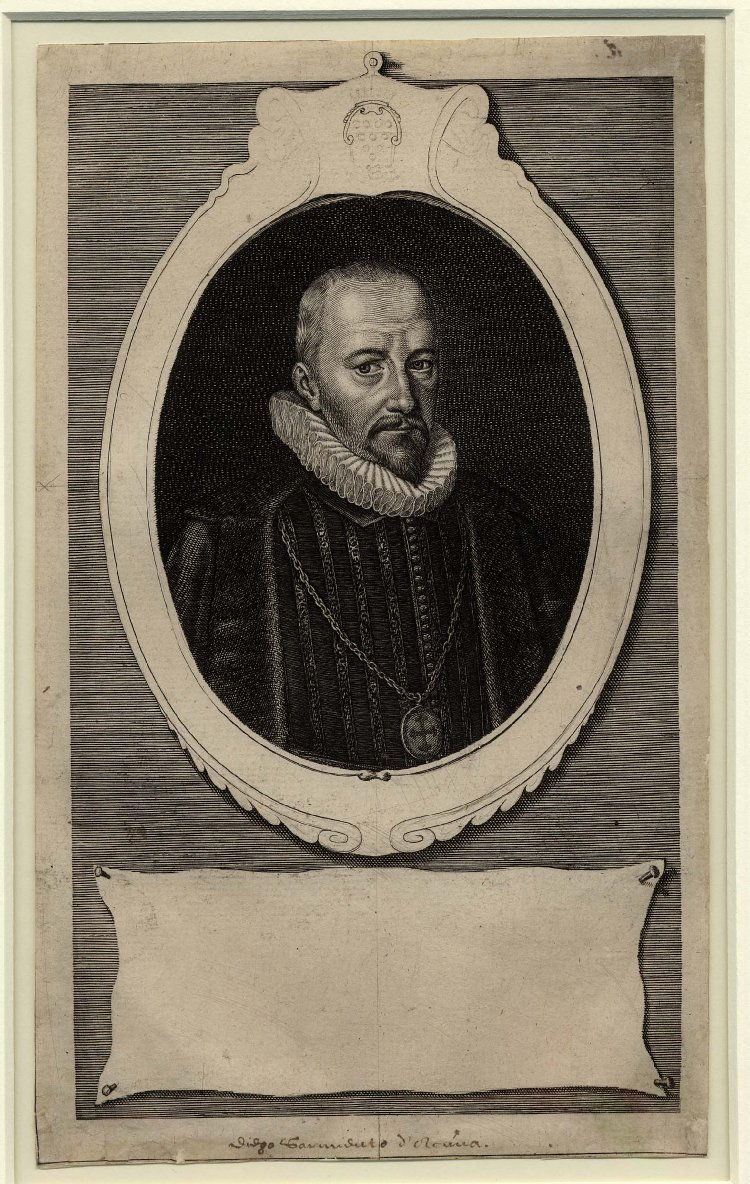
Portrait of Gondomar, engraving by Simon de Passe, 1622

The Howards were Gondomar's principal friends at court – Henry Howard, 1st Earl of Northampton (died 1614), Thomas Howard, 1st Earl of Suffolk, Lord High Treasurer, whose daughter was married to James's favourite, Charles Howard, 1st Earl of Nottingham, Lord High Admiral, Thomas Howard, 21st Earl of Arundel, and their protégés. The "Howard faction" preferred a marriage alliance with Spain over one with France, the traditional ally of Scotland, and they preferred to keep out of open warfare with Spain promoted by the more zealous Puritans. Most of the Howards were Catholics, encouraging them towards a spirit of toleration at home. Like many at the English court, they were receiving pensions from Spain, The pensions had been instituted with the first Spanish embassy to James, to the annual tune of £9125. Gondomar, with an English reputation as a spymaster, actually spent a paltry average of £350 for information. without much effect on their opinions and actions, and Gondomar seldom had the money to follow through. Among the pensioners, in an embarrassing list that surfaced in 1613, at Gondomar's first arrival was the King of England himself.

Gondomar conceived of his embassy as a sortie in enemy country, and he took for his maxim aventurar la vida y osar morir ("risk your life and dare to die"). His opening challenge was his refusal to strike the colours of Spain at his warships' entry to Portsmouth harbour, in which an appeal to the king averted an exchange of cannon fire. His handling of the unconditional release of the Catholic agitator Luisa Carvajal y Mendoza further established him in James's eyes as a man of unexpected strength. In 1617 Sarmiento was created Count of Gondomar. The key to Gondomar's success was his relationship with James, whom he brought to admire and like his witty and learned companionship, his candour, within the obvious limits, and his personal integrity. They called themselves the "two Diegos" and drank from the same bottle (Carter 1964:205). It was to Gondomar, after the failure of the Addled Parliament of 1614, that James made his celebrated remark "I am amazed that my ancestors should have allowed such an institution to come into existence".

A key program for Gondomar at the outset was to block the marriage negotiations between Prince Charles and a sister of Louis XIII, a French counterweight to marital alliances being concluded with the Spanish Habsburgs (see the Spanish Match).

In the matter of Sir Walter Raleigh, it was Gondomar's pressure that cost Sir Walter his head on 29 October 1618. In a moment of weakness, James had shown Gondomar the contract under which Raleigh had sailed, and the restriction upon attacking Spanish settlements, in order to mollify Gondomar's objections to an enterprise on which James had set his heart. Raleigh's attack on San Thomé (near modern Ciudad Guayana) was a public violation; his execution kept the peace with Spain. The English could not forgive Gondomar, who in 1618 obtained leave to come home for his health, but he was then ordered to return by way of Flanders and France with a diplomatic mission.

In 1619 he returned to London and remained until 1622. The Guyana expedition of Roger North in 1620 seemed to be a repeat of Raleigh's violation of Spanish settlements in the Caribbean, and at Gondomar's insistence, North was imprisoned.

The tensest late confrontation was over Count Mansfeld's projected movement of troops raised in England to rescue James's son-in-law Frederick V, Elector Palatine, the "Winter King" of Bohemia. Habsburg Madrid and Brussels were concerned that the French aimed to join Mansfeld's forces and retrieve Artois for France, and the project was let slide.

When Gondomar was allowed to retire and return to Spain, he was named a member of the royal council and governor of one of the king's palaces, and he was appointed to a complimentary mission to Vienna. Gondomar was in Madrid when the Prince of Wales - afterwards Charles I - made his journey there in search of a wife. He died at the house of the Constable of Castile, near Haro in La Rioja.

In February 1625, he was appointed Governor and captain general of the kingdom of Galicia, but he never took office, as he was again sent to England to negotiate with the Monarch to avoid war. But he fell ill in Brussels and was still there when he was informed of English attack on Cádiz in November 1625. He was allowed to return to Spain where he died on October 2, 1626.

Gondomar was twice married, first to his niece Beatrix Sarmiento, by whom he had no children, and then to his cousin Constanza de Acuña, by whom he had four sons and three daughters. The hatred he aroused in England, which was shown by the widespread mockery of an intestinal complaint from which he suffered for years, was a tribute to the zeal with which he served his own master.

Gondomar collected, both before he came to London and during his residence there, a fine library of printed books and manuscripts. Orders for the arrangement, binding and storing of his books in his house at Valladolid appear frequently in his voluminous correspondence. In 1785 the library was ceded by his descendant and representative the marquis of Malpica to Charles III of Spain, and it is now in the Royal Library at Madrid.

A portrait of Gondomar, attributed to Diego Velázquez, was formerly at Stowe, Buckinghamshire. It was mezzotinted by Robert Cooper.

== Gondomar and the Galician language ==
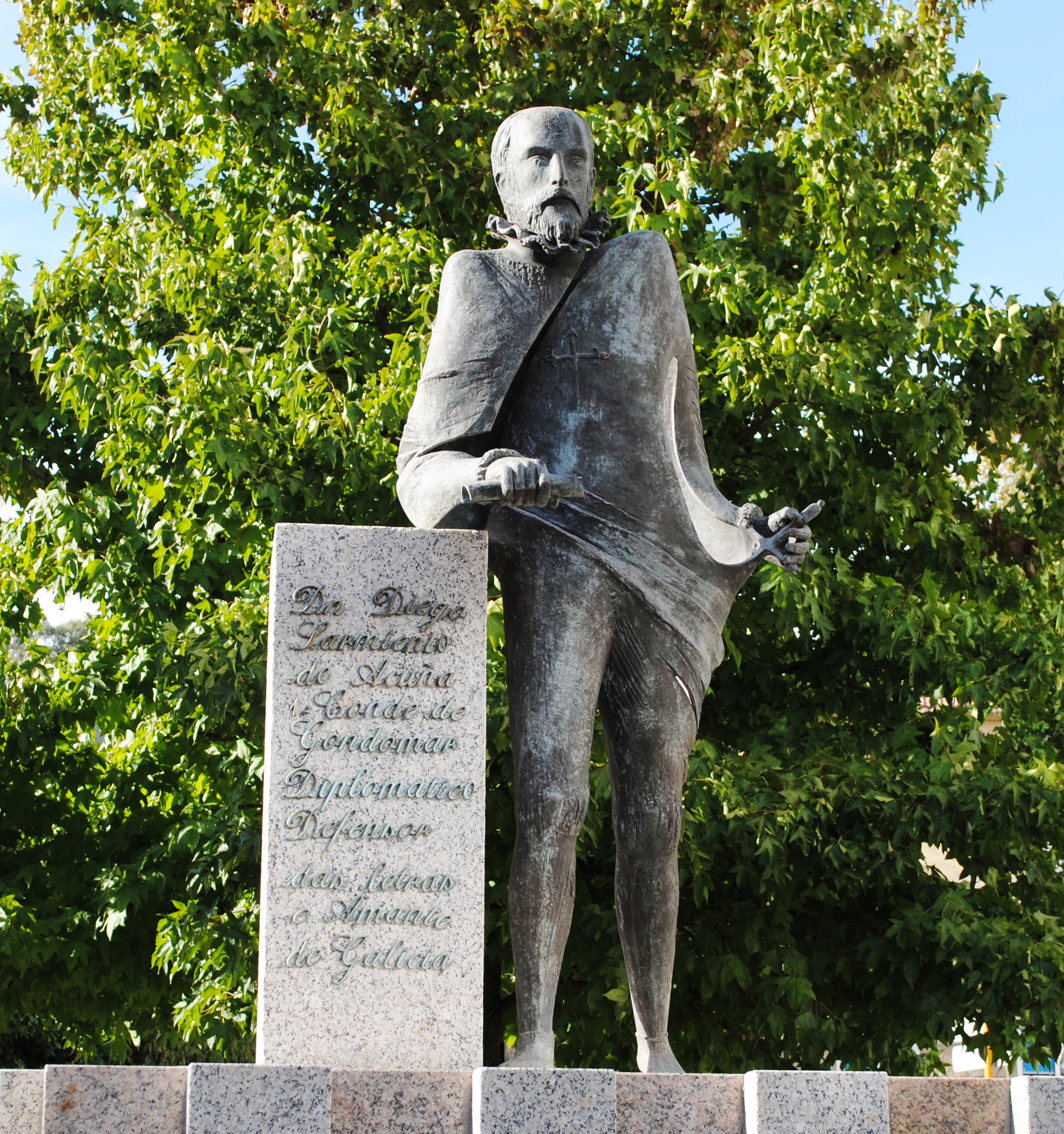
Statue in Gondomar, Galicia: Don Diego Sarmiento de Acuña, 1st Count of Gondomar, diplomatic, defender of the Galician language, and lover of Galicia

Part of the private correspondence of Gondomar with his relatives and with other Galician noblemen has been preserved in the archives of the house of Alba. These private letters are frequently written totally or partially in Galician, and represent an invaluable source for the knowledge of this language in the transition from Old Galician to Middle Galician, a period for which there are but a few literary or public documents preserved. Gondomar is also well known for his Galician patriotic writings in defence of the antiquity and noblesse of the Kingdom of Galicia and of the Galicians, because 'Galicia was a Kingdom and her kings got this title well before any other in Spain'.

== 1911 Encyclopædia Britannica Authorities ==
Gondomar's missions to England were largely dealt with in Samuel Rawson Gardiner's History of England (London, 1883–1884) and more recently in Glyn Redworth, The Prince and the Infanta: The Cultural Politics of the Spanish Match (New Haven, 2003).

In Spanish, Don Pascual de Gayangos wrote a useful biographical introduction to a publication of a few of his letters – Cinco Cartas politico-literarias de Don Diego Sarmiento de Acuña, conde de Gondomar, issued at Madrid in 1869 by the Sociedad de Bibliófilos of the Spanish Academy; and there is a life in English by F.H. Lyon (1910).

== Notes ==
Spanish nobility
New title	Count of Gondomar; 1617–1626	Succeeded by Diego; Sarmiento de Acuña
