= Fort Taurege =

Old Fort in Amapá, Brazil

Fort of Taurege
- Forte do Rio Tauregue
- Amapá, Brazil

Site information
- Type: Fort
- Open to the public: no
- Condition: Disappeared

Location
- Coordinates: 1°17′52″S 50°37′1″W

Site history
- Built: 1628

The Fort of Taurege, also known as Fort of Taurege River, Fort of Torrego, Fort of Tourege, Fort of Torrejo, and Fort of Maracapuru, was a colonial era Amazonian fort located in the confluence of the Taurege River (today Maracapuru River) and the Amazon Delta, possibly in the Island of Tucujus.

== History ==
The structure dates to the beginning of the 17th century, raised by English smugglers of native Brazilian spices and medicines, similarly to a Feitoria. The settlement was attributed to the English and Dutch, being raised by James Purcell, an Irish merchant associated with Dutch capital, with authorization of King James I of England and King Charles I of England, these kings had donated the lands of the Amazon Delta to noblemen of their court, between 1613 and 1627.

The structure has been dated to the year of 1628, attributed at the time a format of a regular polygon.

The Carta Particolare dell Rio d'Amazone con la Costa sin al fiume Maranhan, of the 17th century, in it can be found the fort, the river and the island di Taurego

The Pernambucan Pedro da Costa Favela surprised the fortified structure, that resisted to the siege imposed by his forces, on 26 September 1629. The Portuguese captain Pedro Teixeira arrived with reinforcements, and together, with 2,000 men, most indigenous bowmen, in 98 canoes, they achieved the fort's surrender on 24 October 1629, razing the position., Aires de Souza Chichorro was in charge of the fort's destruction, with orders to extract from the fort its artillery and bring down its walls for a quick and full demolition.

The governor of Maranhão, Gomes Freire de Andrade in a letter addressed to the King on 15 October 1685, remembered:

"(...) the Fortress that better can assure these lands from foreign invasions, is in the lands where they call Torrego; site where another from England, whom found would take the arms of your majesty, with governance of this State under Francisco Coelho de Carvalho (...). "

About the fort, it was registered:

"So many repeated wreckages did not discourage the foreigners, that taking advantage of the commotions that divided the capital of Pará, raised another fort called Torrego on the island of Tocujus, guarded by irishmen commanded by Gomes Porcel (James Purcell), from where they would be expelled by the captains Pedro Teixeira and Pedro da Costa Favela, after having surrendered in the month of September of 1629"

After Purcell's surrender in 1628, in the same year arrived reinforcements led by Roger North, and he would repelled and founded the English fort in Cumaú.
