= Piers Griffith =

Welsh pirate

Piers Griffith (c. 1568–1628) was a Welsh pirate.

== Life ==
Griffith was the son of Sir Rees Griffith MP of Penrhyn, sheriff of Carnarvonshire in 1567, by his second wife, Katharine, daughter of Piers Mostyn of Talacre in Flintshire, and grandson of Sir William Griffith, chamberlain of North Wales. Accounts two centuries later connect Griffith with participation in the Spanish Armada campaign, and raids of Sir Francis Drake. These now are not given much credence by historians.

In the period 1600 to 1603 Griffith was active against Spanish shipping. At the beginning of the reign of James I, he is said to have been obliged to sell or mortgage his estate in order to purchase a pardon, or to defray the expense of his prosecution. This part of the record is considered at least plausible, and supported by contemporary evidence. His estate in any case was encumbered with debt.

After being mortgaged, Penrhyn was taken from Griffith by legal action in 1616. He died on 18 August 1628, and was buried in the broad aisle of Westminster Abbey. The name is variously written; but the Welsh form, Pyrs Gruffydd, is probably the most correct.

== Family ==
He married Margaret, daughter of Sir Thomas Mostyn of Mostyn (who in a second marriage had married Griffith's mother), and by her had issue three sons, who all died in their infancy, and four daughters.
