= Gert Miltzow =

Norwegian writer (1629–1688)

Gert Miltzow (16 February 1629 – 6 December 1688) was a Norwegian clergyman, theologian and historical writer.

Gert Henrikssøn Miltzow was born in Voss, in Søndre Bergenhus county, Norway. He was the son of Henrik Gertsen Miltzow (1599-1666), vicar at Voss Church. In 1668 he married Susanna Schjelderup (1642-1689), daughter of Jens Pedersen Schjelderup, Bishop of Bergen and granddaughter of Danish physician Ole Worm. Miltzow was also the brother-in-law of the historian Edvard Edvardsen.

Miltzow was a student at the University of Copenhagen in 1648, followed by several years in foreign universities. In 1658, he was appointed chaplain with his father, and after his father's death in 1666, he took over the vicar's office in Voss. From 1669, he was also provost of the Hardanger and Voss Deanery.

In 1656, while a student in Wittenberg, he published two Latin versification books of poetry about the Passion of Christ and the Gospel of John. In 1662, he published a translation of the first two parts of Horæ Succisivæ (1631) by Joseph Henshaw, Bishop of Peterborough. In 1679 he published the historical work Presbyterologia Norwegico Wos–Hardangriana. His writings were re-discovered by historians in the 19th century.

== Selected works ==
- Libellvs Historiam Passionis, Crusifixionis, Mortis Et Sepulturæ Domini Ac Salvatoris Nostri Iesu Christi (1656)
- Libellvs Historiam Resurrectionis Et Ascensionis Domini Ac Salvatoris Nostri Iesu Christi (1656)
- In Luctus acerbissimos Qvos ex obitu (-) Elisabethæ Fabriciæs susceperunt (1656)
- Ægypti Hanc brevissimam Diatyposin pro Impetrandis honoribus (1657)
- Presbyterologia Norwegico Wos-Hardangriana (1679)
