= Gurupá =

- Municipality
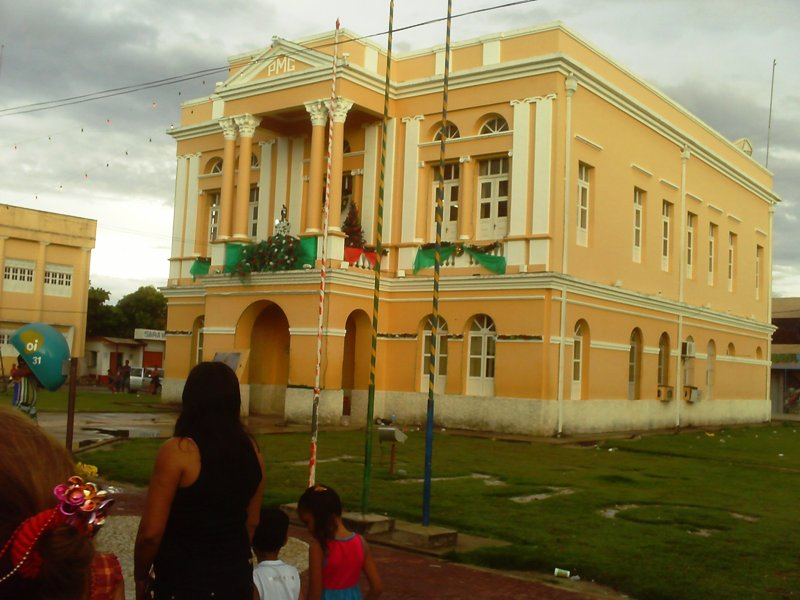
- Town hall of Gurupá

- Flag

- Location in the State of Pará
- Coordinates: 01°24′18″S 51°38′24″W
- Country: Brazil
- Region: North
- State: Pará

Area
  - Total: 8,540.032 km^{2} (3,297.325 sq mi)
- Elevation: 20 m (66 ft)

Population (2020)
  - Total: 33,755
  - Density: 3.4/km^{2} (8.8/sq mi)
- Time zone: UTC−3 (BRT)
- Postal Code: 68300-000

Gurupá or Santo Antonio de Gurupá is a municipality on the Amazon River in state of Pará, northern Brazil located near the world's largest river island, Marajó, 300 km upstream from the upper mouth of the river on the Atlantic coast.

The city is a center for palm heart extraction and commerce. It is a municipal seat and major river boat port.

== History ==
Gurupá is derived from the tupi language words guru (mouth) and pa (wide), and is associated with regions where water channels become wider. The word appears in the name of many localities in Brazil. Varnhagen offers the theory that Guarupá comes from Tupi Igará-r-upá, meaning the place of the canoes.

Gurupá was founded in 1609 as a Dutch trading post that they called Maricay, after the indigenous peoples living there. It was the third of three trading posts established by the Dutch along the lower reaches of the Amazon and Xingu Rivers. The Dutch traded for dye, timber and mother-of-pearl. They also cultivated sugarcane along the Xingu river, to the south of Gurupa.

In 1623, it was captured by Portuguese forces under Bento Maciel Parente, where they built the Fort of Santo Antônio do Gurupá (St. Anthony of Gurupá). It became the royal captaincy of Gurupá in 1633 in recognition of its strategic military and trading position. It was absorbed into Grao-Pará in 1756.

Gurupá would be the starting point to expeditions to the western part of the continent, including an expedition of Pedro Teixeira to Quito for the so-called Drogas do sertão. Raposo Tavares also arrived in the town in 1651 returning from his 1648 Bandeira.

== Economy ==
The economy of Guarupá is largely associated with Commodities. Cattle, Subsistence agriculture of Cassava and the gathering of Açaí and Brazil nuts are the main sources of income of the town.

== See also ==
- List of municipalities in Pará
