= Fort of Santo Antônio do Gurupá =

Fort in Gurupá, Brazil

Fort of Santo Antônio de Gurupá
- Forte de Santo Antonio de Gurupá
- Gurupá, Pará, Brazil
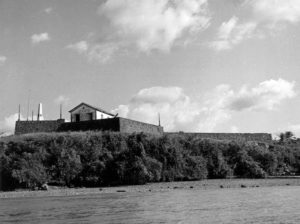

Site information
- Type: Fort
- Condition: Restored in 2018

Location
- Coordinates: 1°21′43″S 51°37′15″W

Site history
- Built: 1601-1619
- In use: 1963

The Fort of Santo Antônio de Gurupá, located in the current-day city of Gurupá, was a Portuguese military fortification in the 17th and 18th centuries, being actively occupied by the Brazilian military as recently as 1958.

The original fortification was built by the Dutch between 1601 and 1619, before it was conquered by Portuguese forces led by Pedro Teixeira and Bento Maciel Parente in 1623, who rebuilt it under the name of Santo Antônio de Gurupá.

As of 1958 it was garrisoned by a small detachment of the 8th Military Region of the Brazilian Army. In 1963 it was placed under governmental trust under the authority of the Ministry of Defense (Brazil).

The Fort underwent a restoration project between 2014 and 2018, concurrently with excavation projects for archeological artifacts, it was re-inaugurated on 20 April 2018 storing inside a small museum, showcasing the result of the excavation projects. In September 2020, during the COVID-19 pandemic, the museum within the fort was vandalized.

== Gallery ==
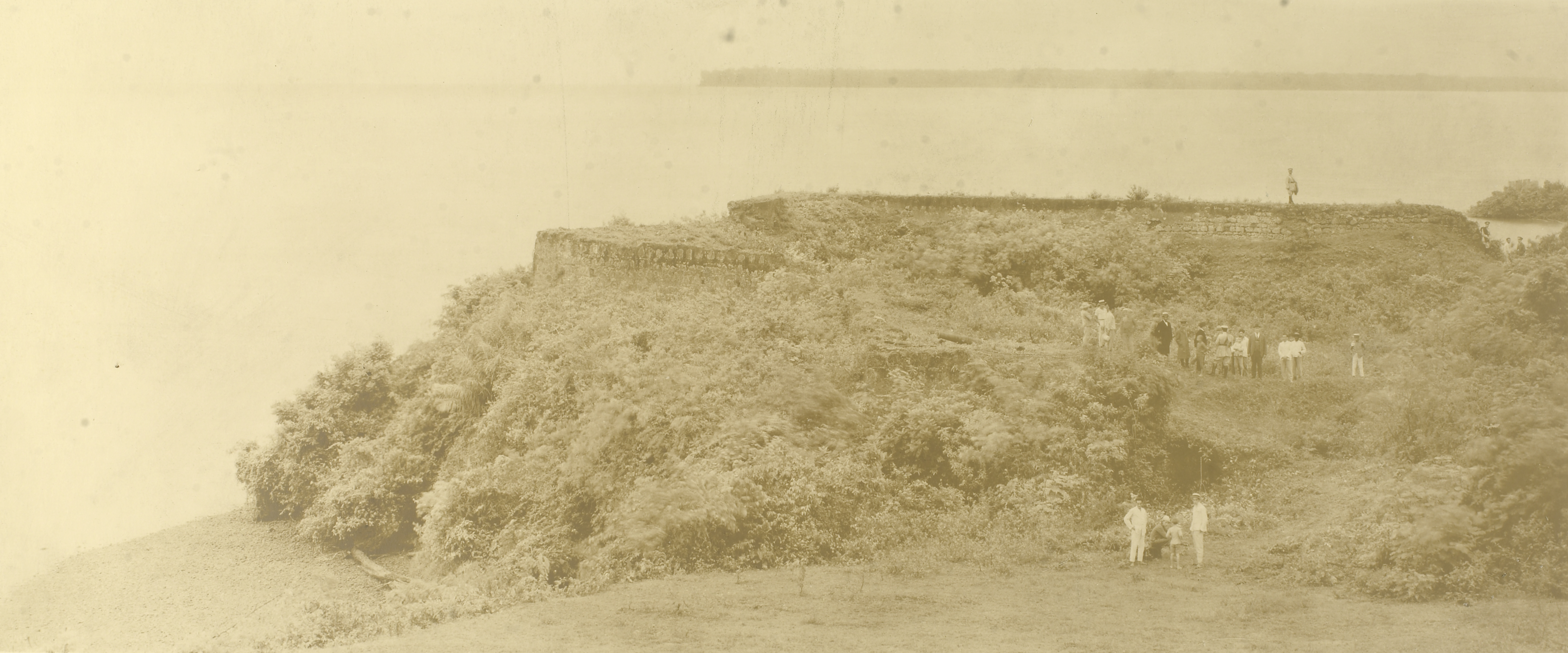
Photo from 1929

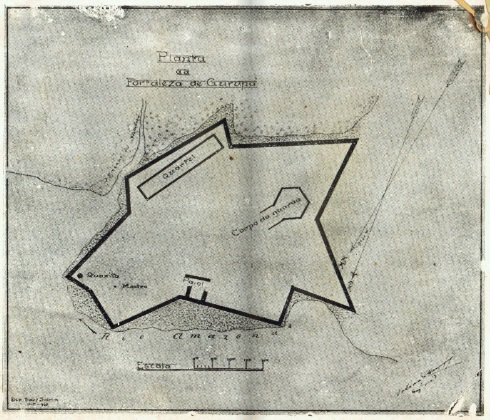
Layout of the Fort in 1927

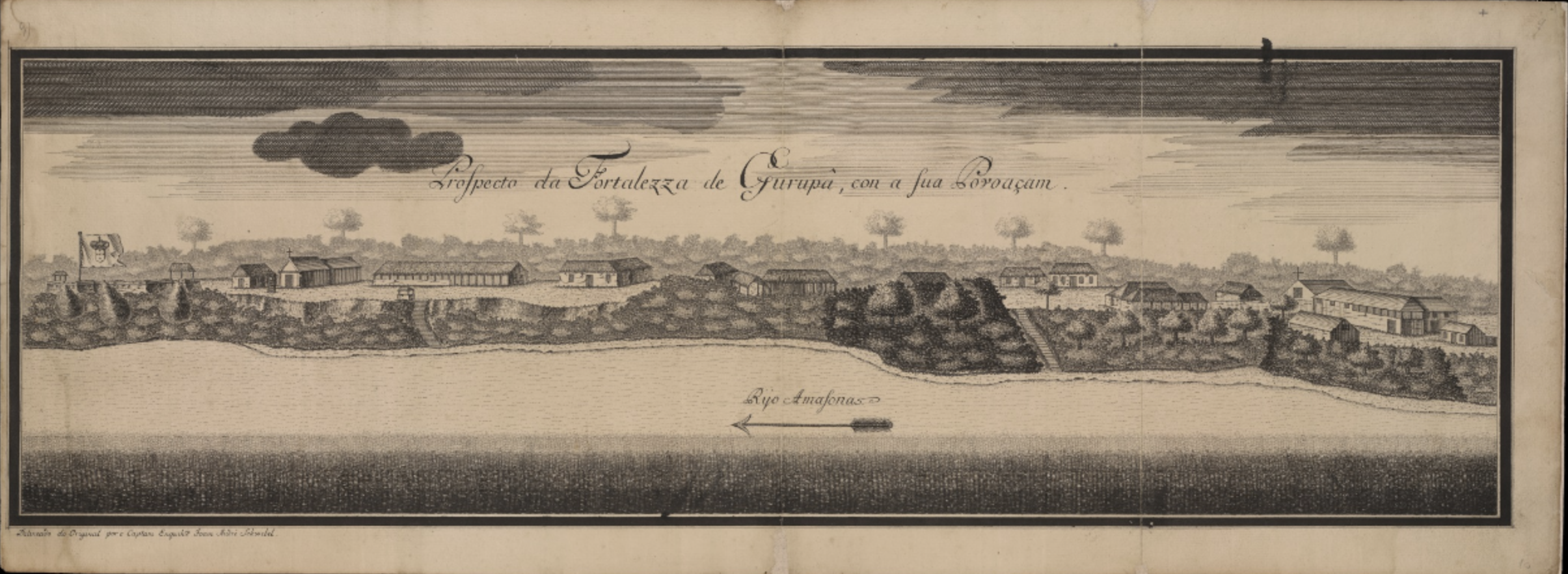
Vista of the Fort in 1756

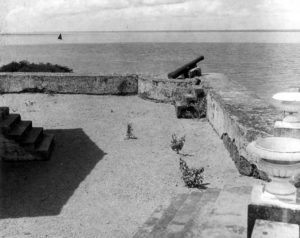
Picture from the inside of the Fort
