= Pedro Teixeira =

Portuguese explorer and colonial administrator (1585–1641)

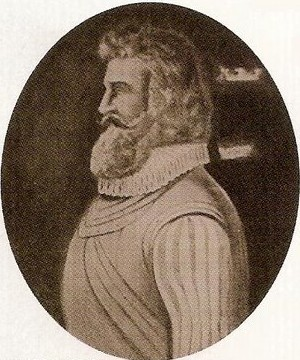
- Born: 1570-1585; Cantanhede, Kingdom of Portugal
- Died: 4 July 1641; Belém, Portuguese Colony of Brazil
- Occupation: Explorer
- Known for: First European to travel up the Amazon River.

Pedro Teixeira (b. 1570–1585 – d. 4 July 1641), occasionally referred to as the Conqueror of the Amazon, was a Portuguese conquistador and military officer. In 1637, almost a century after Francisco de Orellana's journey down the Amazon River, Teixeira became the first European to travel both up and down the river's length. Teixeira also headed the government of the captaincy of Pará in two different periods, one in 1620-1621 and another in 1640–1641.

Teixeira was born either in 1570 or 1585 at the Vila of Cantanhede, born to a noble family, he was a Knight of the Order of Christ and a Portuguese nobleman in service of the royal family, he married Ana Cunha in Praia, Azores, daughter of Sargento-Mor Diogo de Campos Moreno, with whom Teixeira fought together in Maranhão

First arriving in Brazil on 1607, Teixeira participated in Portugal's campaign against French Maranhão, he fought in the Battle of Guaxenduba and distinguished himself commanding either the fort of Natividade or Santa Maria.

Because of Teixeira and other Portuguese who pushed into the depths of the Amazon, Portugal was able to obtain far more of South America from their Spanish competitors than the Treaty of Tordesillas had granted in 1494. Teixeira's expedition became the first simultaneously to travel up and down the Amazon River. He was called by the Indian natives Curiua-Catu, meaning The Good and Friendly White Man.

== Asia ==
Pedro Teixeira, travelled extensively in Asia, and wrote an account of his travels: Narrative of my Journey from India to Italy. He was in Malacca in 1600. He was then in Baghdad in 1604, where he gives an account of the new Ottoman Empire governor Hadim Yusuf Pasha."

== Early Colonization of Pará ==
Pedro Teixeira was part of Francisco Caldeira Castelo Branco's expedition to found the city of Belém. On 9 August 1616, by orders of Francisco Caldeira, he left with two armed canoes to fight the Dutch and English, which had established positions in the northern shore of the Amazon River, where he captured a Dutch ship in the Xingu estuary and brought its artillery guns to Belém. In 1617, he also led attacks against the Tupinambás, aiding an ongoing campaign by Portuguese settlers in Maranhão, with the goal of a clearing a land road between Belém and São Luis.

In 1620, when Custodio Valente, the Capitão-Mor in charge of Pará left for Portugal. Teixeira, his adjunct, became interim governor of the Captaincy. During this period, Bento Maciel Parente made an attempt to take the captaincy for himself by force, but facing resistance by Pedro Teixeira, left for Maranhão. Parente was later granted the position by the Governor of Brazil, and immediately gave orders for Teixeira to leave and lead another expedition against the natives.

In 1623, he commanded a large-scale operation to destroy the Dutch fort of Mariocai, where he and Bento Maciel Parente raised the fort of Santo Antônio to protect the surrounding area against foreign incursions, the settlement around the fort would later be known as the town of Gurupá.

He also led several more campaigns and expeditions in the Amazon defeating the Dutch in their forts of Orange and Nassau, both in the Xingu River, and on 23 May 1625 assaulted the shared Dutch and English fortress of Mandiatuba(Maniutuba?) on the Xingu River, facing the forces of Dutch commander Nicolau Ouaden, who briefly fled to the Island of Tucujus where he and the English commander Philip Pursell were killed by Teixeira's forces, in the same month he stopped a new attempt by the Dutch to occupy the islands in the Amazon Delta and on 21 October 1625 he defeated the Dutch in the fort of Taurege(Tourege/Torrego), expelling the Dutch from their last holdings in the Amazon basin.

In 1626, Manuel de Sousa d'Eça, Capitão-Mor of Pará, ordered Pedro Teixeira to procure native slaves. Teixeira left Belém with 26 soldiers and a Capuchin friar, visited two native villages, one of Tapuyusús Indians which he bribed, and another of Tapajós Indians, who refused to trade men for goods.

In September 1629, Teixeira besieged the English Fort of Taurege, where he defeated two enemy sorties and on 24 October 1629 the help that was sent to relieved the fort's forces, with the garrison led by James Pursell surrendering in the same day and being sent to Belém. This earned a reprisal on 26 October 1629, led by the English Captain, Roger North, who attacked Teixeira in the Fort of Santo Antônio in Gurupá, where Teixeira triumphed and rebuked the English assault, North, defeated left to found the fort of Camaú.

== Amazon Expedition ==
=== 1637: Upriver Journey ===
In 1637, two Franciscan friars, André de Toledo and Domingos de La Brieba, under threats from nearby natives, abandoned their mission on the Amazon River and, with six soldiers, paddled a canoe up the entire length of the river to the Portuguese settlement of Gurupá, from where they left to Belém, and later to São Luís.

Their arrival led the Portuguese to seriously consider an expedition against the current of the Amazon River. Consequently, the governor of Maranhão, Jácome Raimundo de Noronha, commissioned an expedition with the goal of discovering the river all the way to Quito, learning the best places to establish fortifications, securing through the good conduct of the expeditionaries and small gifts the peace and friendship of the indigenous tribes, and founding a settlement to mark the limit, in the Amazon, of Portuguese control. And so did Pedro Teixeira.

On 25 July 1637 Pedro Teixeira's fleet arrived in Guajará, from where it left to Cametá to secure more crewmates and ships, with everything ready Teixeira left on 28 October 1637, his expedition consisted of 47 large canoes, with 70 soldiers, a few clergymen, and 1,200 Natives, his guide was the friar Domingos de La Brieba.

In January 1638, the expedition found the mouth of the Rio Negro, and on 3 July 1638 the mouth of the Napo River, finally reaching the Quijos river on 15 August 1638, crossing the Spanish settlement of Baeza, and from there arrived in Quito in September 1638.

=== 1639: Return Journey ===
Completed the initial journey, on 16 February 1639, Teixeira and his expedition left Quito for Belém. Six months later, on 16 August 1639, they founded the settlement of Franciscana, whose name was chosen in honor of the Franciscan friars whose initial journey served as the impetus for Teixeira's expedition, on the River Ouro (theorized to be the Aguarico River). Of Franciscana little remains to this day, and the Portuguese didn't manage to keep that border, with it later being fixed on the Javary River.

Teixeira's expedition arrived back in the city of Belém on 12 December 1639, for his merits he was promoted to Capitão-Mor. He accepted the post of governor of Pará on 28 February 1640, a position in which he would remain in for a year and three months, until 26 May 1641. He died on 4 July 1641. His ashes rest on the Belém Metropolitan Cathedral in the city of Belém.

== Legacy ==
Teixeira's grand expedition and the founding of the settlement of Franciscana to mark the limit between the Portuguese and Spanish Crown would be used extensively by the Portuguese to sustain their claims to Upper Amazonas, including in the negotiations for the Treaty of Madrid, over a hundred years afterwards.

In his honor, the river patrol vessel Pedro Teixeira was commissioned into the Brazilian Navy on December 17, 1973.

On 10 December 2009, the Brazilian Senate made a tribute to Pedro Teixeira, celebrating the 370 years since Teixeira's Amazon Expedition.

== Sources ==
- Acuña, Christobal de. 1641. Nuevo descubrimiento del gran Rio de las Amazonas. Madrid: Imprenta del Reyno.
- Edmundson, G. (1920). "The Voyage of Pedro Teixeira on the Amazon from Pará to Quito and Back, 1637-39". Transactions of the Royal Historical Society. 3: 52–71. doi:10.2307/3678305. ISSN 0080-4401.
- Smith, Anthony (1994). Explorers of the Amazon. Chicago: University of Chicago Press. ISBN 0-226-76337-4
- Taner, Melis (14 October 2019). Caught in a Whirlwind: A Cultural History of Ottoman Baghdad as Reflected in Its Illustrated Manuscripts. BRILL. ISBN 978-90-04-41280-4.
- Teixeira, Pedro (1902). The travels of Pedro Teixeira; with his "Kings of Harmuz," and extracts from his "Kings of Persia.". London, Printed for the Hakluyt Society.
