= Hendrick Lucifer =

17th century Dutch pirate

Hendrick Jacobszoon Lucifer (c. 1583–1627) was a Dutch-born pirate.

Hendrick's last name, Lucifer, referred to a lighting stick, not to the fallen angel Lucifer, and was most likely used as a nickname due to his use of fire and smoke to surprise enemies.

== Greatest success and death ==
In 1627, Hendrick was in charge of 3 ships transporting colonists to Guyana for the Dutch West India Company, accompanied by two other pirate captains. One encounter off the coast of Cuba caused by a near collision with a two-ship Honduran treasure fleet allowed Hendrick's fleet to capture a ship and contents worth 1.2 million guilders. Hendrick fought as brave as a lion, (according to surviving crewmen), and personally killed around ten enemy soldiers in close combat, before being hit by a bullet. He still continued his plundering, but another bullet hit him in the chest and he had to quit fighting. He made it back safely to his ship, and his crew finished up the last of the treasure fleet's sailors. Lucifer, by then mortally wounded, gave the order to transfer the loot (1404 chests of Indigo, 4280 animal skins, 32 jars of balsam ointment and several other items) to his ship. He then walked to his cabin. He slowly lay down to bed, saying he would go to rest, and then died as a result of wounds received during the encounter.
