= Portuguese conquest of Maranhão =

1612 conquest

- Part of Portuguese colonization of the Americas
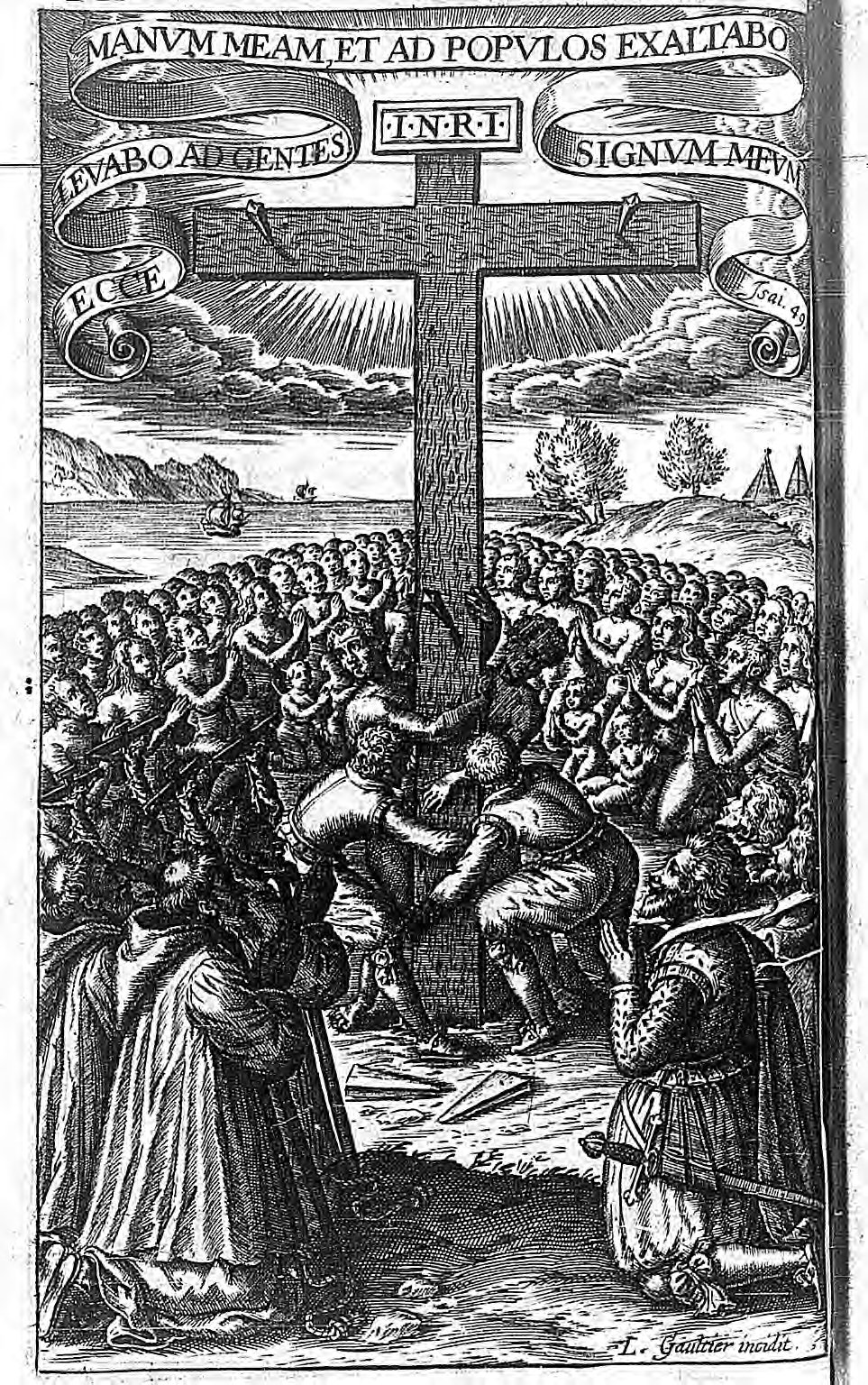
- Woodcut depicting the erection of a cross to mark the foundation of France Equinoctiale
Date	23 August 1612 – 3 November 1615
Location	Maranhão, Brazil
Result	Portuguese victory

Belligerents
Portuguese Empire; Supported by: Tabajara tribes Ceará tribes Potiguara tribes	Kingdom of France; Supported by: Tupinamba

Commanders and leaders
Jerónimo de Albuquerque; Diogo de Campos Moreno; Alexandre de Moura; Mandiocapuba; Antônio Filipe Camarão	Daniel de la Touche; Louis de Pézieux †; Monsieur de la Fos Benart; Monsieur de Canonville

Strength
500 men	200 soldiers 2500 native warriors 10 ships 50 canoes

Casualties and losses
10 dead 18 wounded	115 French dead 400 native dead 8 POW

The Portuguese conquest of Maranhão took place between 23 August 1612 and 3 November 1615, in the state of Maranhão, Brazil, between Portuguese and Tabajara forces, on the one hand, and French and Tupinambá forces, on the other. The campaign resulted in the definitive expulsion of the French from Maranhão on November 4, 1615.

The expulsion of the French allowed a large part of the Amazon to fall under Portuguese dominion.

== Background ==
The French had previously tried to establish a colony Brazil, France Antarctique, until they were defeated by Portugal in 1567.

In 1611, French regent Maria de Médici provided further instructions for the establishment of a new colony in Maranhão. In March 1612 a fleet of three ships and 500 men set sail from Cancale in Brattany, stopping at Fernando de Noronha before making a landfall in Brazil. The French established a colony in Maranhão, with the support of local indigenous people: on September 8, the village of Saint Louis was founded and the construction of the Fort Saint Louis began on top of a hill in front of the sea, in a region claimed by Portugal. In 1613 Daniel de La Touche had fort Itapery built in modern-day São José de Ribamar

Aware of the presence of the French in the north of Maranhão, the governor-general of Brazil Gaspar de Sousa organized in Pernambuco an expedition to conquer the area from the French. On August 23, 1614, serjeant-major Diogo de Campos left Recife with 300 men and in Rio Grande do Norte joined captain-general Jerónimo de Albuquerque, who was accompanied by a large contingent of indigenous auxiliaries. The Portuguese expedition with 500 men led by Albuquerque camped on the mouth of the Periá River looking for a place to build a fortification. They faced a shortage of food and fresh water. A group of 14 Portuguese scouts discovered a suitable place for the fort and the expedition set sail again on October 2, 1614.

On October 26, they reached an area called Guaxindubá by the natives, on the right bank of the Bay of São José, among many islands and narrow channels. A hexagon-shaped fortification was built on the beach of Guaxenduba under the guidance of engineer Francisco Frias de Mesquita, and named Santa Maria, about 20 km from the current seat of the municipality of Icatu, within sight of the French fort Itapary.

Once established, the Portuguese set to work building and keeping guard of their fort while conducting the reconnaissance of the region. Some natives whom the Portuguese contacted claimed that the island was full of French, while others claimed that the French had left.

On October 30, a group of indigenous people from the island killed four women of the natives who were accompanying the Portuguese. This caused them to become suspicious of the natives and believe that they had been sent by the French to spy on their ships. Through a Tupinamba prisoner made by Mandiocapuba Azevedo became aware of the strength of the French. On the final days of October, the Portuguese at the fort Santa Maria and on the island of Santana observed the movement of French ships in the Bay of São José and the landing of artillery pieces.

== First French attack ==
On November 10, 1614, the sergeant-major Diogo de Campos sent a group of sailors to defend the vessels that were anchored or stranded in the estuary after arguing with Jerónimo de Albuquerque, ordering that they remain vigilant. At dawn on 11 November, the French, guided by Monsieur de Pézieux, Monsieur du Prat and François Rasilly, approached the ships silently. When the Portuguese became aware of the attack, the sailors blew the trumpets and alerted the soldiers of the fort, who fired the artillery, however without any effect on the French. The sailors abandoned the boats, of which three that were further away from land were captured by the French: a caravel, a war patache and another vessel.

== Battle of Guaxenduba ==
Portuguese expedition against Equinoctial France

Proposed coat of arms of Equinoctial France.

On the morning of November 19, 1614, Portuguese soldiers sighted in the distance a large number of vessels approaching the shore close to fort Santa Maria. Jerónimo de Albuquerque went to the beach with 80 Portuguese soldiers to attack them on landing but realizing how much superior in number the number of enemies were, he withdrew. Hundreds of fighters landed on the beaches soon after. The French had 200 soldiers, many of whom were nobles, in two squadrons, carrying steel armour, swords and muskets of great quality. They had 50 canoes and 2500 Indians, two thousand from Tapuitapera (currently Alcântara) and 100 from Cumã (currently Guimarães). Daniel de la Touche, commander of the French, remained at sea with more than 200 soldiers led by the knight François Rasilly. A long exchange of fire began and in a first encounter between the French and the detachment now under sergeant Diogo de Campos, a Portuguese and two French soldiers were killed. Campos then withdrew with his forces to fort Santa Maria to meet Albuquerque for further orders.

=== Use of spyglasses ===
The battle of Guaxenduba saw one of the earliest recorded uses of a spyglass in battle. Diogo de Campos reported that:

At this time, with some arquebusiers, who got closer, the serjeant-major began to skirmish to see how it could be fought, and two Frenchmen having fallen, plus a Portuguese soldier, he halted the endeavour, and the serjeant-major came to the fort, to see what his colleague determined, which he found with a long-sighted eyeglass looking through an embrasure to see what the enemies were doing [...]

=== Hill battle ===
Fort Santa Maria was erected in front of a hill at a distance of a light cannon shot, bordered by the sea to the north and to a river from which the Portuguese drew water to the south. The French landed and under the command of Monsieur de La Fos-Benart and about 400 Tupinambás fortified themselves on the top of the hill: they built, in all, 7 trenches with large stones, fortifying the entire space between the sea and the top of the hill, so that the canoes that arrived were partially hidden.

By a secret path, Jerónimo de Albuquerque climbed the hill with 75 soldiers and 80 native archers, while Diogo de Campos attacked the French and indigenous warriors who disembarked. Las Fos-Benard landed out of a canoe with a trumpeter carrying the royal coat of arms of France and a letter in French written by Daniel de La Touche, which said that the Portuguese must surrender in 4 hours or they would be massacred. Diogo de Campos realized that the letter was an attempt by the French to gain time and obtain information about Portuguese troops.

By that point, the soldiers and archers accompanying Jerónimo de Albuquerque had already reached the first trench. The natives who defended it with the French were a large crowd, and the Portuguese never missed a shot. Daniel de La Touche watched from the sea as the French army suffered heavy casualties. In less than an hour, the area around the fort Santa Maria was littered with French and native dead. La Touche sent the fastest ships to the beach to prevent further damage to his troops, but, under the bombardment of Portuguese artillery, he was forced to withdraw.

Once the Portuguese were in control of the fortified hill, Diogo de Campos ordered them to set fire to all the canoes, which were docked at the base of the hill.

=== French waiver ===
With all the canoes on fire, the remaining French on land had no way to flee and all they could do was retreat to the ramparts on top of the hill. Among them were Monsieur de la Fos Benart and Monsieur de Canonville. At the end of the battle, near the hill, many of the Portuguese soldiers put themselves in the line of fire of the muskets of the enemies, who still resisted. Turcou, who was the interpreter of the French in communicating with the native, was shot by the Portuguese, and with him, Monsieur de la Fos Benart, leader of the natives who fought with the French. Without guidance, the remaining natives, more than 600, began to flee, going down the hill. They were joined by the French soldiers, who had no more gunpowder to shoot.

== Truce ==
After the Battle of Guaxenduba, the remaining French troops in Maranhão gathered at Fort Saint Louis. To buy time, Ravardière proposed a truce to the Portuguese, which was accepted under the stipulation that a Portuguese officer and a Frenchman would go to France and a Portuguese officer and a Frenchman would go to Portugal, to seek a solution to the conflict in the Courts of those countries. With the ceasefire, Portuguese, French and natives remained at peace.

== Assault of Fort Saint Louis ==
News of the truce reached Europe in 1615 and orders were later dispatched to the governor-general of Brazil Gaspar de Sousa to dislodge the French from Maranhão by peaceful or forceful means, in person or via an experienced commander. In October 1615, the captain-general of Pernambuco Alexandre de Moura arrived in Maranhão, bringing reinforcements and supplies and being of superior rank, assumed overall command of the Portuguese force. He disregarded the truce made with the French and demanded Daniel de la Touche to leave Maranhão in 5 months, pledging to indemnify him. Ravardière delivered the Fort of Itapari.

Three months later, Diogo de Campos and Martim Soares returned from Europe, bringing more troops and final orders for the French to definitively abandon Brazil. On November 1, 1615, Alexandre de Moura ordered that the Fort of São Luís be surrounded and landed his troops at the point of São Francisco.

The French fort was assaulted and after 2 days of fighting La Ravardière surrendered.

== Aftermath ==
Instead of compensating the French as had been agreed, the Portuguese shipped them back to France in two ships, with only what they needed.

Some French stayed in Maranhão, like Charles Des Vaux, who helped with communication with the natives; most were blacksmiths. In January 1616, Daniel de La Touche was taken by force to Pernambuco, where he received an indemnity and a pardon from the governor-general, to prevent him from joining other French privateers and leading them again. In 1619 he was arrested in Lisbon, and remained imprisoned for three years in the Belém Tower.

With Maranhão firmly under Portuguese control, before leaving for Pernambuco Alexandre de Moura appointed Francisco Caldeira Castello-Branco as captain-major tasked with conquering the region of Pará.

== Legend of the miracle of Guaxenduba ==
In the 1769 book "História da Companhia de Jesus na Extinta Província do Maranhão e Pará", Father José de Moraes wrote of the appearance of Our Lady of Victory among the Portuguese battalions, encouraging the soldiers throughout the battle, turning sand into gunpowder and pebbles into projectiles. Nossa Senhora da Vitória is the patron saint of São Luís and the city's cathedral is named after her and a scripture in Latin, which reads: 1629 • SANCTÆ MARIÆ DE VICTORIA DICATUM • 1922.

== See also ==
- Portuguese Brazil
- Tupinambás Uprising
