= Roger North (governor) =

Roger North (1585? – 1652?) was an English colonial projector.

== Life ==
Born about 1585, he was grandson of Roger North, 2nd Baron North, and fourth child of Sir John North.

=== Raleigh expedition ===
North was one of the captains who sailed with Sir Walter Raleigh in his final voyage to Guiana in 1617; he was connected through his sister-in-law Frances, lady North with the originator of the expedition, Captain Lawrence Kemys.

North's ensign, John Howard, died on 6 October after leaving the island of Bravo, as fever ravaged the fleet. On 17 November 1617 the adventurers came in sight of the coast of Guiana, and cast anchor off Cayenne. Raleigh, who was disabled by fever, ordered five small ships to sail into the River Orinoco, led by Kemys and carrying five companies of fifty. Of one company North was in command. After a difficult passage up the river the explorers disembarked, and bivouacked on the left bank, not knowing they were near San Tomé, founded by the Spanish, who made a sudden attack. The English force pursued the enemy into the town, and burnt it.

Kemys returned to the fleet, now at anchor off Punto de Gallo; the expedition, with supplies for one month, had been away for two. North's soldiers and sailors were now in a state of mutiny. Raleigh's ships weighed slipped away, with three only remaining to escort Raleigh's ship, the Destiny, on her voyage home. North was on board one of the two vessels sent on to Plymouth with despatches, with the task of reporting to the king on 23 May 1618.

=== Second expedition ===
North in 1619 petitioned for letters patent authorising him to establish the king's right to the coast and country adjoining the River Amazon; to found a plantation or settlement there, and to open a direct trade with the natives. The project was opposed by the Spanish diplomat Gondomar, who seems to have secured the support of Lord Digby; Roger's brother Dudley North, 3rd Baron North attacked Digby when he argued against the expedition. King James, however, provisionally granted the required letters patent under the great seal, and nominated North governor of the proposed settlement. The Earl of Arundel and Earl of Warwick, Lord North, and other noblemen were among the adventurers.

Gondomar's agents had obtained a command from the king that the voyage should be delayed until further orders; and when Gondomar himself arrived, he tried to block it. North's petition for leave to start obtained no answer. He did receive through the Duke of Lennox a message of encouragement from the king, and made his preparations. He sailed out of Plymouth Sound early in May 1620, having obtained a passport from the Duke of Buckingham, the Lord High Admiral. A proclamation was issued (15 May), accusing North of disloyalty, and Lord North was imprisoned on a charge of connivance at the offence. To Gondomar, King James blamed Buckingham. Buckingham was then called into the room, and when asked by the king why he had sold a passport to North without the king's knowledge, replied, "Because you never give me any money yourself".

Meanwhile, North fell in with a Dutch vessel, heard of the proclamation against him, and returned of his own accord. By this time his ship was laden with seven thousand pounds of tobacco. The ship and cargo were seized at the instance of Gondomar, and North himself committed to the Tower of London (6 January 1621). By the intervention of Buckingham, North was released (18 July 1621) on the same evening as Henry Percy, 9th Earl of Northumberland. Once at liberty, he made good his claim to the restitution of his ship and cargo, and his tobacco was returned to him.

=== Third expedition ===
North next obtained (2 June 1627), with Robert Harcourt, letters patent under the great seal from Charles I, authorising them to form a company for "the Plantation of Guiana", North being named as deputy governor of the settlement. Short of funds, this expedition was fitted out, a plantation established in 1627, and trade opened by North's endeavours.

=== Later life ===
In 1632 North was in England, for a chancery suit, into which he had been drawn as administrator to his brother-in-law, Sir Francis Coningsby, of North Mimms in Hertfordshire, and as executor to Mary, Lady Coningsby, his widow. In this suit the manors of North Mimms and Woodhall, as well as other lands, were involved. In 1634 North petitioned the king for a speedy settlement of these proceedings, which had then lasted for 17 years.

The plantation was left without government, the French and Dutch were gaining ground upon it, and their trade supplanting that of the English. In July 1636 Sir John North wrote that he wished his brother Roger could be captain of one of the king's ships.

During this time Roger was often at Kirtling, the home of Dudley North, 3rd Baron North, with his brothers. In 1652 he was ill at his own house in Princes Street, Bloomsbury. He died late in 1652, or early in 1653, leaving to his brother and executor Gilbert lands in the Fens, and all his property, apart from some minor legacies to relatives.

== Notes ==
Attribution

This article incorporates text from a publication now in the public domain: Lee, Sidney, ed. (1895). "North, Roger (1585?-1652?)". Dictionary of National Biography. Vol. 41. London: Smith, Elder & Co.
