= Bodor =

Bodor is a surname. Notable people with the surname include:

- Ádám Bodor (born 1936), Hungarian author
- Bob Bodor, American football player and coach
- Boldizsár Bodor (born 1982), Hungarian footballer
- István Bodor (1927–2000), Hungarian sprint canoeist
- László Bödör (born 1933), Hungarian footballer
- Lilla Bodor (born 1979), Hungarian painter
- Mihály Richárd Bodor (born 1962), Hungarian swimmer
- Ödön Bodor (1882–1927), Hungarian middle-distance runner and footballer
- Richárd Bodor (born 1979), Hungarian swimmer
- Tibor Bodor (1921–2000), Hungarian actor

== See also ==
- Bodo (disambiguation)
- Bodorova (disambiguation)
- Boudoir
