= Bodo =

Bodo may refer to:

== Ethnicity ==
- Boro people, also called Bodo, an ethno-linguistic group mainly from Northwest Assam, India
- Bodo-Kachari people, an umbrella group from Nepal, India and Bangladesh that includes the Boro people

== Culture and language ==
- Boro culture, the culture of the Boro people
- Boro language (India), also rendered Bodo, spoken by the Boro people
- Boroic languages, a linguistic group of languages that includes the Boro language of India
- Bodo language (Bantu), a possibly extinct Bantu language of the Central African Republic

== Places ==
=== Brazil ===
- Bodó, Rio Grande do Norte, a municipality in Rio Grande do Norte
- Bodó River, river in Rio Grande do Norte

=== Ivory Coast ===
- Bodo, Lacs, a village in Lacs District
- Bodo, Lagunes, a village in Lagunes District

=== Norway ===
- Bodø Municipality, a municipality in Nordland county
- Bodø, a city within Bodø Municipality in Nordland county

=== Elsewhere ===
- Bodo, Alberta, a hamlet in Canada
- Bodo, Cameroon, village of Far North Region, Cameroon
- Bodo, Chad, a sub-prefecture of Logone Occidental Region, Chad
- Bodo, Nigeria, a town in Rivers State, Nigeria
- Bodo, a village in Balinț Commune, Timiș County, Romania
- BoDo (district), a district of Boise, Idaho, U.S.

== People ==
- Bodo (deacon) (814–876), a Frankish deacon at the court of Emperor Louis the Pious
- Bodo (hypostrategos), a Carthaginian senator and naval officer
- Bodo (given name)
- Bodo (surname)

== Science ==
- Bodo (genus), a genus of flagellate excavates
- Bodo cranium, the skull of an extinct type of hominin species
- Bodo saltans, the best-known species of the genus Bodo

== Other uses ==
- Bodo blouse, a sheer and transparent loose blouse
- Bodø Airport (IATA: BOO, ICAO: ENBO), a civil airport in Bodø, Norway
- Bodø HK, a Norwegian handball team
- Bodo League massacre, killing incident in South Korea during the summer of 1950
- Bodó River, a river in Rio Grande do Norte, Brazil
- Bodo (news program), daily news broadcast of Korean Central Television

== See also ==
- Boro (disambiguation)
- Bodoland, proposed state of India
- Bodor, a surname
