= Boro =

Boro may refer to:

== People ==
- Bodo people, also Boro, of northeast India
- Boro (surname)

== Places ==
- Boro, New South Wales, a locality in Australia
- Boro, a division in Alego Usonga constituency, Siaya County in Kenya
- Boro, Burkina Faso, a town in Burkina Faso
- Boro, Togo is a village is the Kara region of Togo
- A local nickname for the English town Middlesbrough and its football team Middlesbrough F.C.
- Boro (River Boro), a distributary of River Slaney
- Birsk, a town in Bashkortostan, Russia, known as Бөрө (Börö) in Bashkir
- Boro, Purulia, a village, with a police station, in Purulia district, West Bengal, India
- Boro, Botswana, a place in Ngamiland East, Botswana

== Sporting ==
- Boro (Formula One), a Dutch Formula One constructor
- "Boro" association football club nicknames, based in northern England:
  - Middlesbrough FC
  - Scarborough Athletic
  - Defunct Scarborough FC
  - Radcliffe F.C.

== Other ==
- Boro (textile), a class of Japanese textiles that have been mended or patched together
- The BORO approach, a process for developing formal ontologies
- Boro rice, an ecotype of rice used for the spring dry-season crop
- Boro, short for borosilicate glass
- Boro language (disambiguation)

== See also ==
- Borro, a UK based personal asset finance company
- Boros (disambiguation)
- Bodo (disambiguation)
- Borough
