= Pedra da Boca State Park =

State park in Paraíba, Brazil

- Parque Estadual da Pedra da Boca
- IUCN category II (national park)
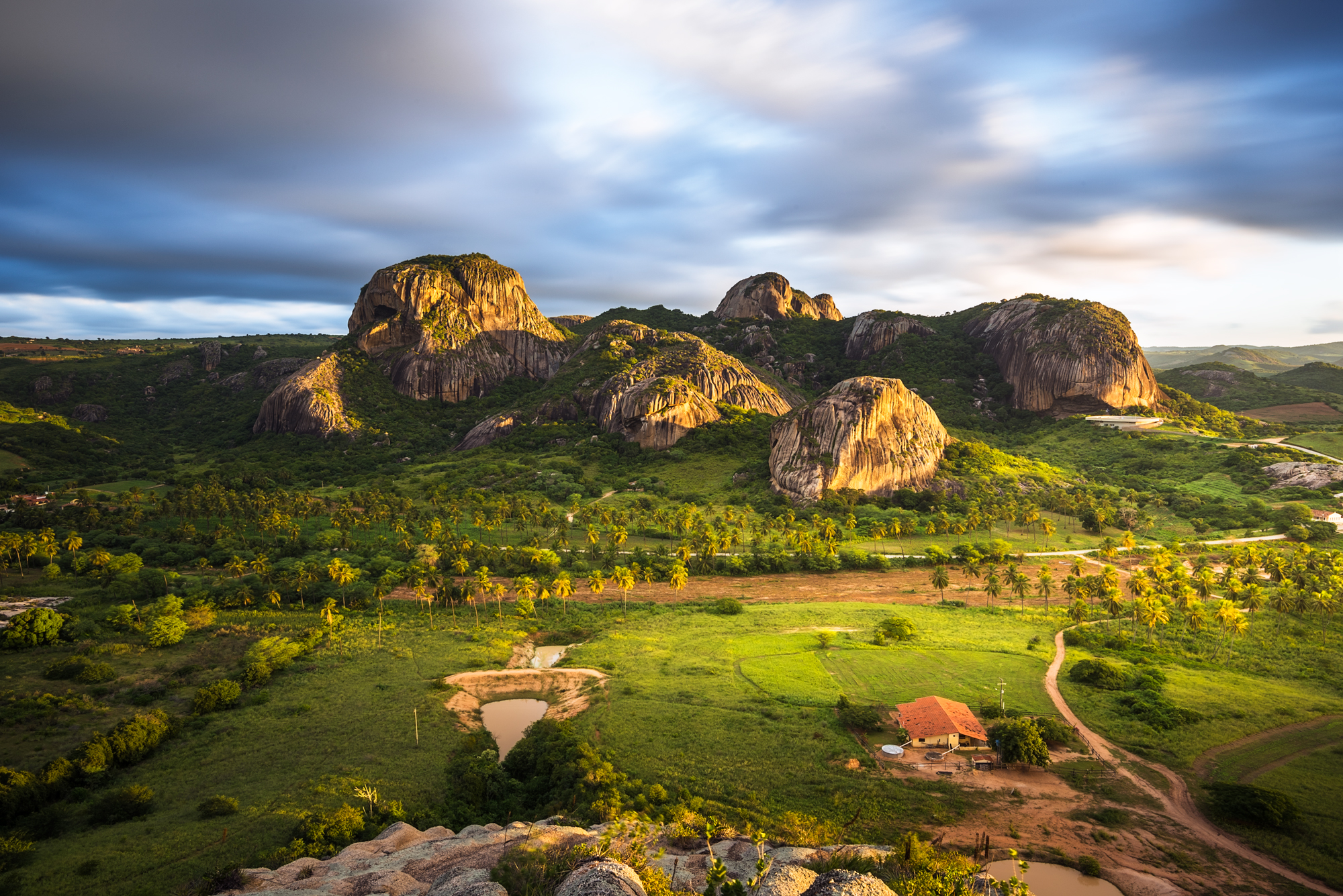
- Pedra da Boca and Pedra da Caveira seen from Pedra do Lagarto

- Location within Brazil
- Nearest city: Araruna, Paraíba
- Coordinates: 6.456893°S 35.675847°W
- Area: 160 hectares (400 acres)
- Designation: State park
- Created: 7 February 2000

The Pedra da Boca State Park (Portuguese: Parque Estadual da Pedra da Boca) is a state park in the state of Paraíba, Brazil. It contains a group of unusual rocky outcrops surrounded by cerrado vegetation. One of the rocks has a large collection of prehistoric rock paintings, and is also a site of religious services for devotees of Our Lady of Fátima.

== Location ==
The Pedra da Boca State Park is in the municipality of Araruna, Paraíba, in the Curimataú Oriental microregion. It has an area of 157.3 hectares (389 acres) on the border with Rio Grande do Norte. It is 170 kilometres (110 mi) from João Pessoa, the state capital, and 22 kilometres (14 mi) from the town of Araruna. It lies in the foothills between the Serra da Confusão and the Serra de Araruna. The park is in the basin of the Calabouço River, an intermittent tributary of the Curimataú River that forms the border between Paraíba and Rio Grande do Norte and is an important source of water for the local population.

The Pedra da Boca State Park was created by state governor José Targino Maranhão by decree 20.889 of 7 February 2000. Soon after the park was created the land was expropriated and families living in the park were compensated.

== Environment ==
The Köppen climate classification is Bsh: semi-arid, hot and dry, with a short rainy season in the autumn and winter. Annual rainfall is 800 to 1,100 millimetres (31 to 43 in). Temperatures range from 25 to 27 °C (77 to 81 °F). The vegetation is in the caatinga biome. Vegetation includes primitive shrubs and trees, with small remnants of montane forest. It has been strongly affected by extraction of wood, cattle grazing and agriculture. The water resources of the Calabouço basin have been badly managed. The riparian forest is devastated, the soil is impoverished and the river bed is silted.

There is significant biodiversity, with an estimated 21 species of reptiles and amphibians, 16 of mammals and 125 of plants. The main species of flora are Anadenanthera peregrina, Myracrodruon urundeuva, Syagrus comosa, Ficus species, Hymenaea courbaril, Tocoyena brasiliensis, Ziziphus joazeiro, Libidibia ferrea, Mimosa acustitipula, Mimosa tenuiflora, Chloroleucon foliolosum, Bromelia laciniosa, Cereus jamacaru, Bauhinia cheilanta, Combretum leprosum, Erythrina velutina, Guazuma ulmifolia, Handroanthus chrysotrichus, Talisia esculenta, Sisalana perrine, Spondias tuberosa, Pilosocereus gounellei, Aspidosperma pyrifolium, Melocactus bahiensis, Schinopsis brasiliensis, Spondias tuberosa, Croton sincorensis and Pilosocereus squamosus.

== Rock formations ==
The park contains a set of rocks of porphyritic granite composition, with traces of gneisses and quartzites. The outcrops have rounded faces and extensive vertical corrugations from the ground to their summits. "Pedra da Boca" (Rock of the Mouth) is the name of a rock formation about 336 metres (1,102 ft) high with a cavity formed by erosion which resembles a giant toad about to gulp something. Other dramatic outcrops include the Pedra da Caveira (Pedra do Anselmo), Pedra do RN, Pedra do Carneiro and Pedra do Letreiro. The Pedra do Letreiro, also known as the Pedra da Santa, has a large collection of hieroglyph rock paintings of the northeast tradition, attributed to the Tarairiu and Paiacu people who formerly lived in the region, members of the great Kiriri nation known as Tapuias.

== Visiting ==
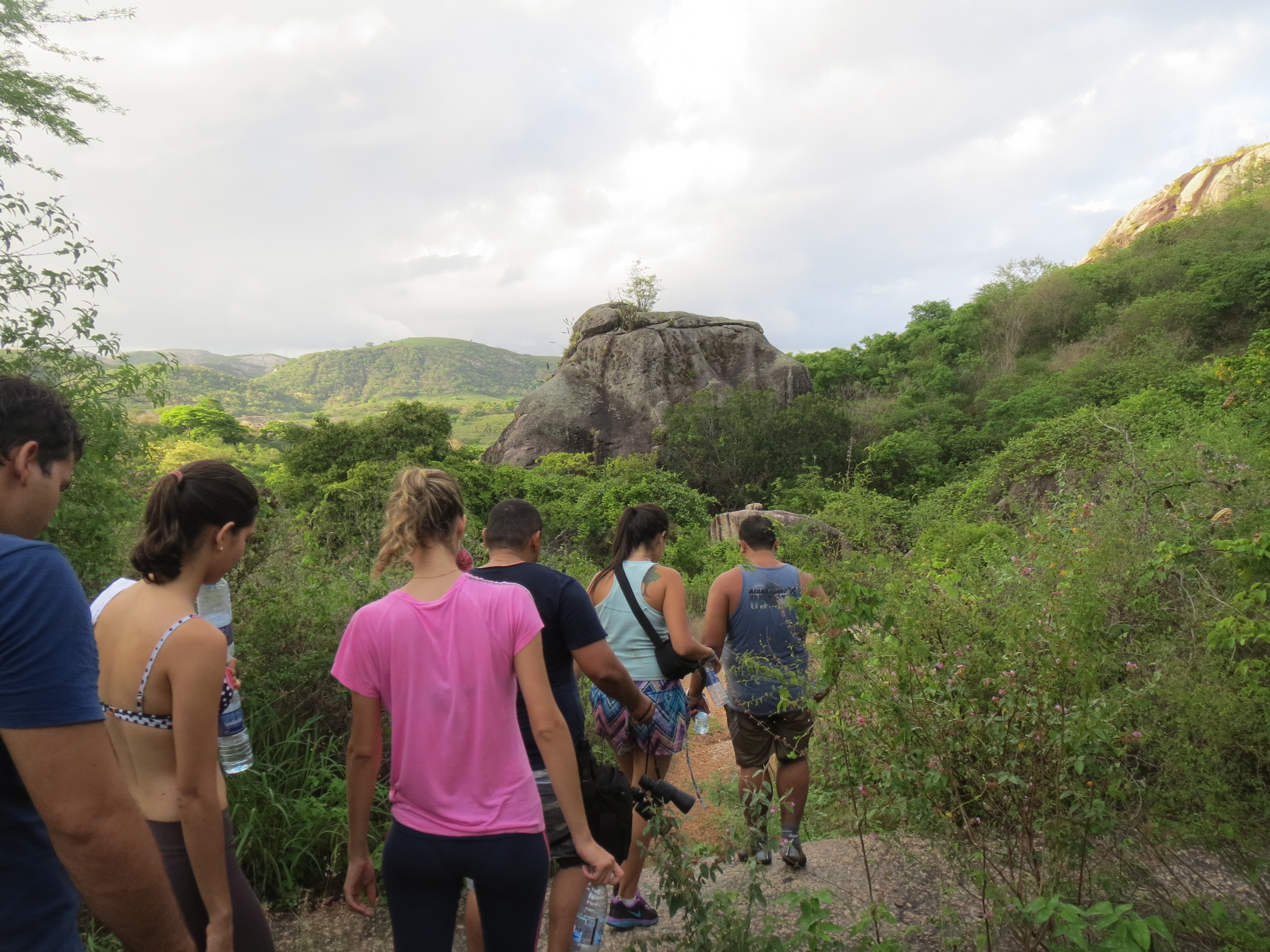
Visitors on ecological trail

The park receives about 1,200 visitors per month, mainly in the high season of summer. The park attracts scholars, tourists and visitors who love nature and adventure sports. There is an ecological trail that takes about three hours for active people, with some climbing involved. Use of ropes is required in some places. This visits all the formations, and passes a spring of water, specimens of forest and a variety of birds and reptiles. Visitors may also practice rappelling and climbing on the rocks as well as mountain biking and paragliding. As of 2007 there was a shortage of infrastructure and of an effective plan to preserve the environment from damage by visitors. The park lacked signs and educational material to make the visitors aware of the importance of conservation.

== Religious use ==
On the 13th of every month, particularly in May, thousands of devotees from the region and from further afield come to open air masses. The politician Celso Lisboa (1909–90) built an altar in the cave of the Pedra da Santa dedicated to Our Lady of Fatima. It became impossible to use this place due to bees living on the huge rock, and for a period outdoor masses were held by the chapel near the park. The state government then built the Sanctuary of Our Lady of Fatima near the Pedra da Santa in the form of a Greek arena with a capacity of about 5,000 and facilities that include bathrooms, cafeteria, offices and accommodation for the pilgrims.

== Sources ==
- Cavalcante, Márcio Balbino (2007), "Parque Estadual da Pedra da Boca/PB: um olhar sobre o planejamento do ecoturismo em unidades de conservação na Paraíba", Revista OKARA: Geografia em debate, 1 (2), João Pessoa, PB: DGEOC/CCEN/UFPB, ISSN 1982-3878
- Paul, Vicente (2016), "O parque nacional da Pedra da Boca no Agreste", Ecoturismo e Cultura (in Portuguese)
- Rafael, Wellington (3 September 2016), "Parque Estadual da Pedra da Boca – Encanto, beleza e potencial econômico", Agenda Paraíba (in Portuguese), archived from the original on September 11, 2016
- "Trilha Ecológica da Pedra da Boca", Geotrilhas/RN (in Portuguese), 20 August 2009
