= Boros =

Boros may refer to:

- Boros (surname)
- Boros (beetle), a genus of conifer bark beetles
- Bodo people, an ethnic group in India
- Boros Legion, a Magic: The Gathering faction from Ravnica
- Lord Boros, a character from the series One Punch Man
- The Boros Collection, an art collection by Karen and Christian Boros on display in the Reichsbahnbunker Friedrichstraße in Berlin

== See also ==
- Boro (disambiguation)
