= Calabouço =

Calabouço may refer to:

- Calabouço River, a river in eastern Brazil
- Calabouço Airport, former name of Santos Dumont Airport, a domestic hub in Rio de Janeiro, Brazil
