= Boros (surname) =

Boros is a surname. It is sometimes spelled with diacritics on the final "s", as in Boroš or Boroș. Notable people with the surname include:

== Boros ==
- Adalbert Boros (1908–2003), Romanian Roman Catholic archbishop and political prisoner
- Attila Boros (born ?), Hungarian canoer
- Christian Boros (born 1964), German advertising agency founder and art collector
- Csongor Boros (born 1997), Serbian-born Hungarian footballer
- Eddie Boros (1934–2007), American artist
- Endre Boros (born 1953), Hungarian-American mathematician, professor, and editor
- Ferike Boros (1880–1951), Hungarian-born American actress
- Gábor Boros (born 1997), Hungarian footballer
- Gergely Boros (born ?), Hungarian canoer
- Guy Boros (born 1964), American golfer; son of Julius Boros
- Imre Boros (born 1947), Hungarian economist and politician
- István Boros (fl. early 1930s), Hungarian table tennis player
- Julius Boros (1920–1994), American golfer; father of Guy Boros
- Katalin Boros (born 1941), Hungarian swimmer and Olympics competitor
- László Boros (born 1982), Hungarian high jumper and Olympics competitor
- Ottó Boros (1929–1988), Hungarian water polo player and Olympic medalist
- Péter Boros (1908–1976), Hungarian gymnast and Olympics competitor
- Sándor Boros (born 1949), Hungarian javelin thrower, Olympics competitor, and coach
- Steve Boros (1936–2010), American baseball player, coach, manager, scout, and administrator
- Zoltán Boros (1948–2025), Hungarian orienteering competitor

== Boroš ==
- Jaroslav Boroš (born 1947), Slovak footballer
- Michael Boroš (born 1992), Czech cyclist
- Peter Boroš (born 1980), Slovak footballer
- Tamara Boroš (born 1977), Hungarian-Croatian table tennis player

== Boroș ==
- Aurel Boroș (1922–?), Romanian footballer
- Iosif Boroș (born 1953), Romanian handball player and Olympic medalist
