= CATU =

CATU can refer to:

- Catu, a city in Brazil
- Catu River, a river in Brazil
- Ceramic and Allied Trades Union, a former British trade union
- Community Action Tenants Union, an Irish tenants' union
- Phineas and Ferb the Movie: Candace Against the Universe, a 2020 American animated musical adventure comedy film
