= Apodi =

Apodi may refer to:

- Apodi, Rio Grande do Norte, Brazil, a municipality
- Apodi River, Rio Grande do Norte, Brazil
- Apodi (footballer) (born 1986), Luís Dialisson de Souza Alves, Brazilian footballer
