= Nísia Floresta National Forest =

Brazilian national forest

- Floresta Nacional de Nísia Floresta
- IUCN category VI (protected area with sustainable use of natural resources)
- Location within Brazil
- Nearest city: Nísia Floresta, Rio Grande do Norte
- Coordinates: 6°04′55″S 35°10′59″W
- Area: 168.84 hectares (417.2 acres)
- Designation: National forest
- Created: 27 September 2001
- Administrator: Chico Mendes Institute for Biodiversity Conservation

Nísia Floresta National Forest (Portuguese: Floresta Nacional de Nísia Floresta) is a national forest in the state of Rio Grande do Norte, Brazil.

== Location ==
The Nísia Floresta National Forest lies in the municipality of Nísia Floresta in the state of Rio Grande do Norte. It has an area of 168.84 hectares (417.2 acres). The forest is in the state's coastal plain at 80 metres (260 ft) above sea level. It is in the Trairi River basin. It holds two seasonal lakes of 0.7 and 7.1 hectares (1.7 and 17.5 acres) and part of a permanent lake of 20.8 hectares (51 acres). Temperatures range from 21 to 30 °C (70 to 86 °F) with an average of 26 °C (79 °F). Average annual rainfall is 1,455 millimetres (57.3 in). The region has a dry season from September to February and a rainy season from March to August.

The Nísia Floresta National Forest is in the Atlantic Forest biome. Native Atlantic Forest vegetation covers 60% of the forest and an experimentation area with various types of fruit trees covers 40%. The area used for experimental purposes until the end of the 1970s is in a relatively advanced stage of regeneration of the native forest. The Dinoponera quadriceps ant is endemic, one of the world's largest at 3 centimetres (1.2 in). This ant is not found in areas disturbed by human actions, so is a good indicator of a preserved environment.

== Conservation ==
The Nísia Floresta National Forest was created by decree on 27 September 2001 and is administered by the Chico Mendes Institute for Biodiversity Conservation (ICMBio). It is classed as IUCN protected area category VI (protected area with sustainable use of natural resources) with the objective of sustainable multiple use of forest resources and scientific research, with emphasis on methods for sustainable exploitation of native forests. An advisory council was appointed on 22 October 2008. The management plan for the forest was approved on 10 September 2012.

== Sources ==
- Flona de Nísia Floresta (in Portuguese), Chico Mendes Institute for Biodiversity Conservation
- FLONA de Nísia Floresta (in Portuguese), ISA: Instituto Socioambiental
- Unidade de Conservação: Floresta Nacional de Nísia Floresta (in Portuguese), MMA: Ministério do Meio Ambiente
