= Guaju River =

River in Paraiba & Rio Grande do Norte, Brazil

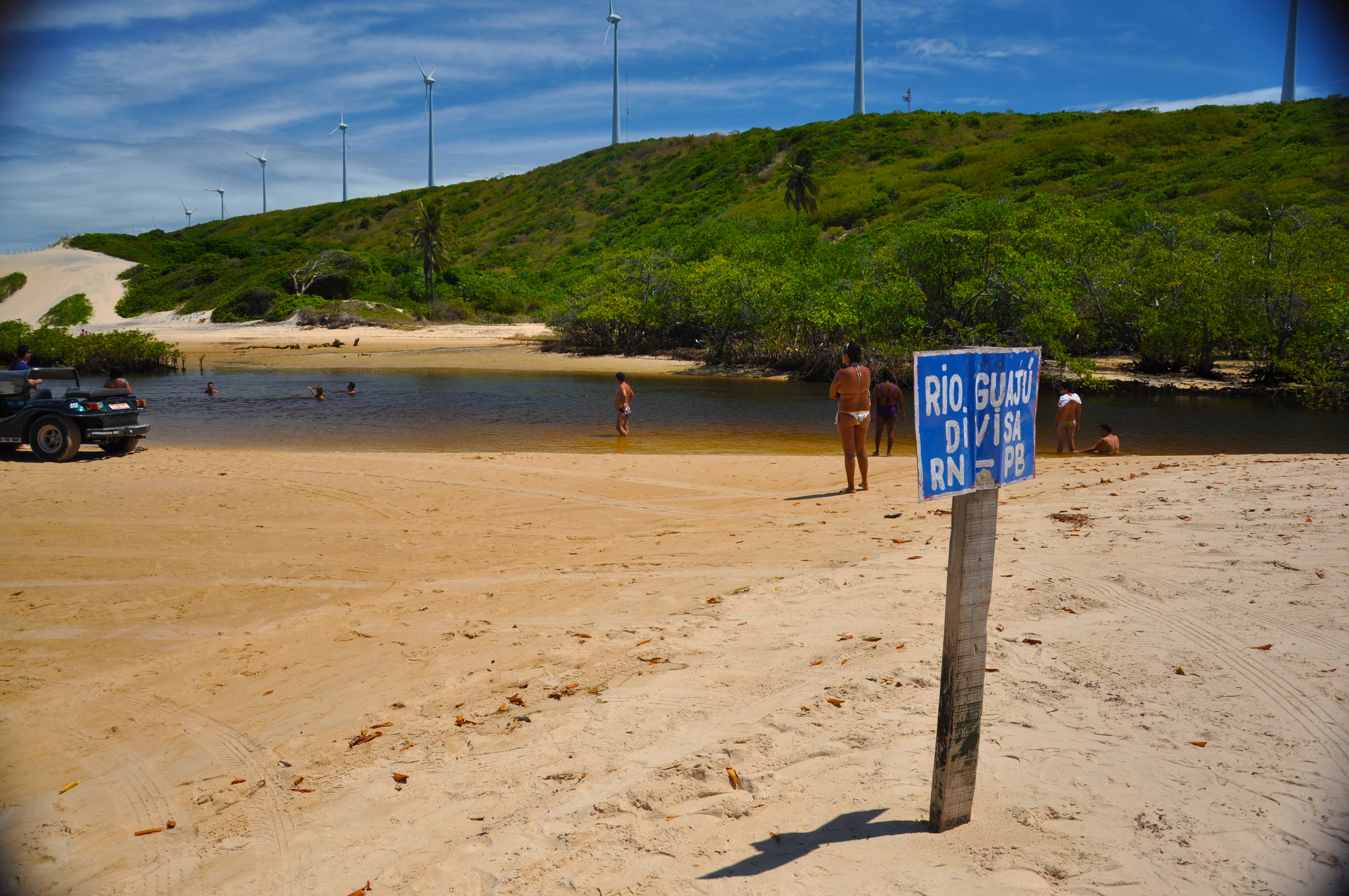

- Location of mouth

Location
- Country: Brazil
- State: Paraíba, Rio Grande do Norte

Physical characteristics
- Source
  - location: Paraíba state
- Mouth
  - location: Rio Grande do Norte state
  - coordinates: 6°29′16″S 34°58′06″W
  - elevation: 0 m (0 ft)

The Guaju River is a river in Northeastern Brazil. It forms part of the border between the Paraíba and Rio Grande do Norte states.

== See also ==
- List of rivers of Paraíba
- List of rivers of Rio Grande do Norte
