= Jacu River =

Location
- Country: Brazil

Physical characteristics
- Source
  - location: Paraíba state
- Mouth: Lagoa de Guaraíras
  - location: Rio Grande do Norte state
  - coordinates: 6°12′50″S 35°08′34″W

The Jacu River is a river in the Rio Grande do Norte and Paraíba states in eastern Brazil.

== See also ==
- List of rivers of Rio Grande do Norte
- List of rivers of Paraíba
