= Cunaú River =

Location
- Country: Brazil

Physical characteristics
- Source
  - location: Rio Grande do Norte state

The Cunaú River is a river of Rio Grande do Norte state in northeastern Brazil.

== See also ==
- List of rivers of Rio Grande do Norte
