= Pitimbu River =

Coordinates: 5°56′S 35°10′W

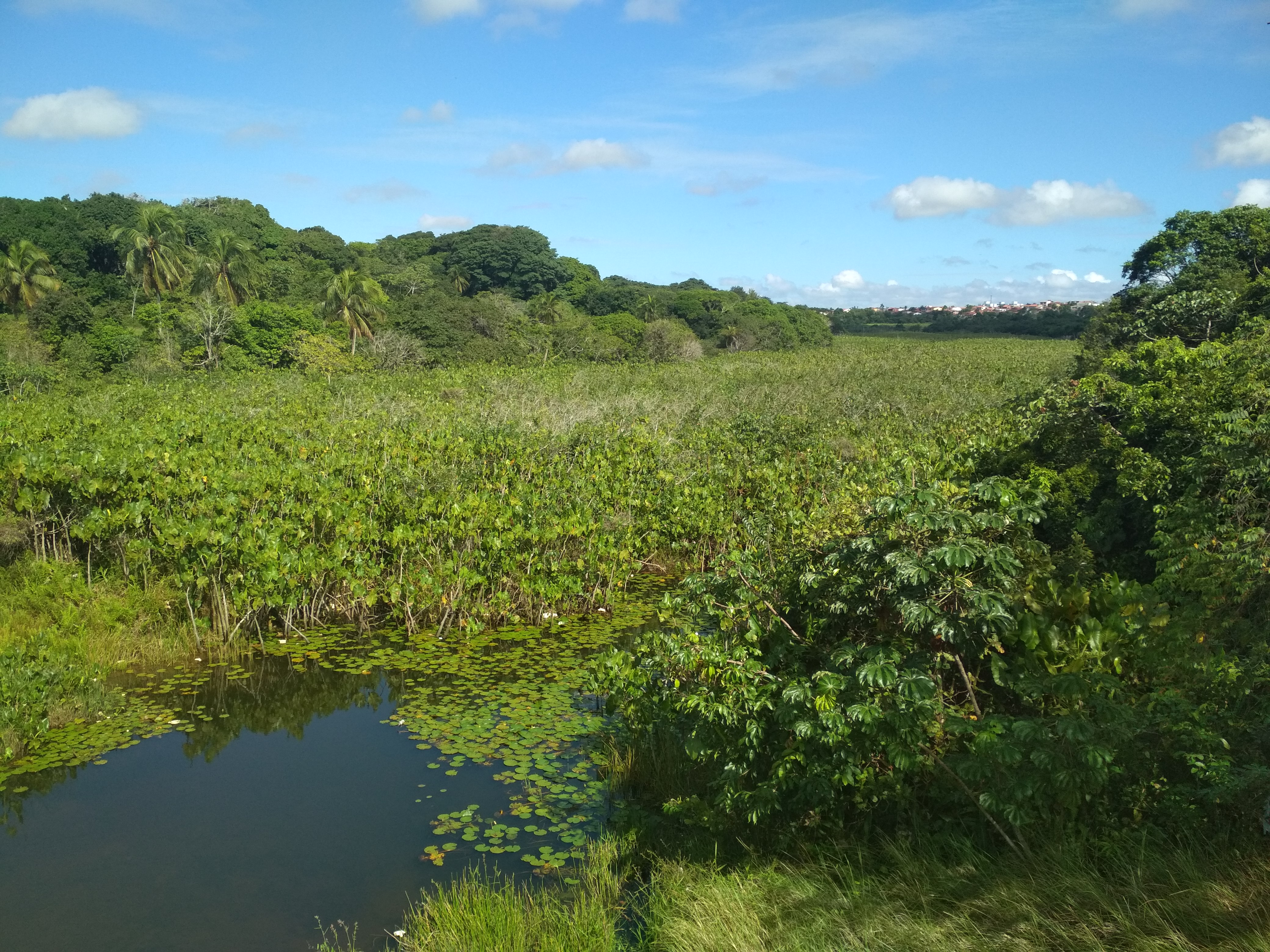

Location
- Country: Brazil

Physical characteristics
- Source
  - location: Rio Grande do Norte state

The Pitimbu River is a river of Rio Grande do Norte state in northeastern Brazil. In 2007 the river was tested for potential cytotoxic and genotoxic surface water.

== See also ==
- List of rivers of Rio Grande do Norte
