= Trairi River (Rio Grande do Norte) =

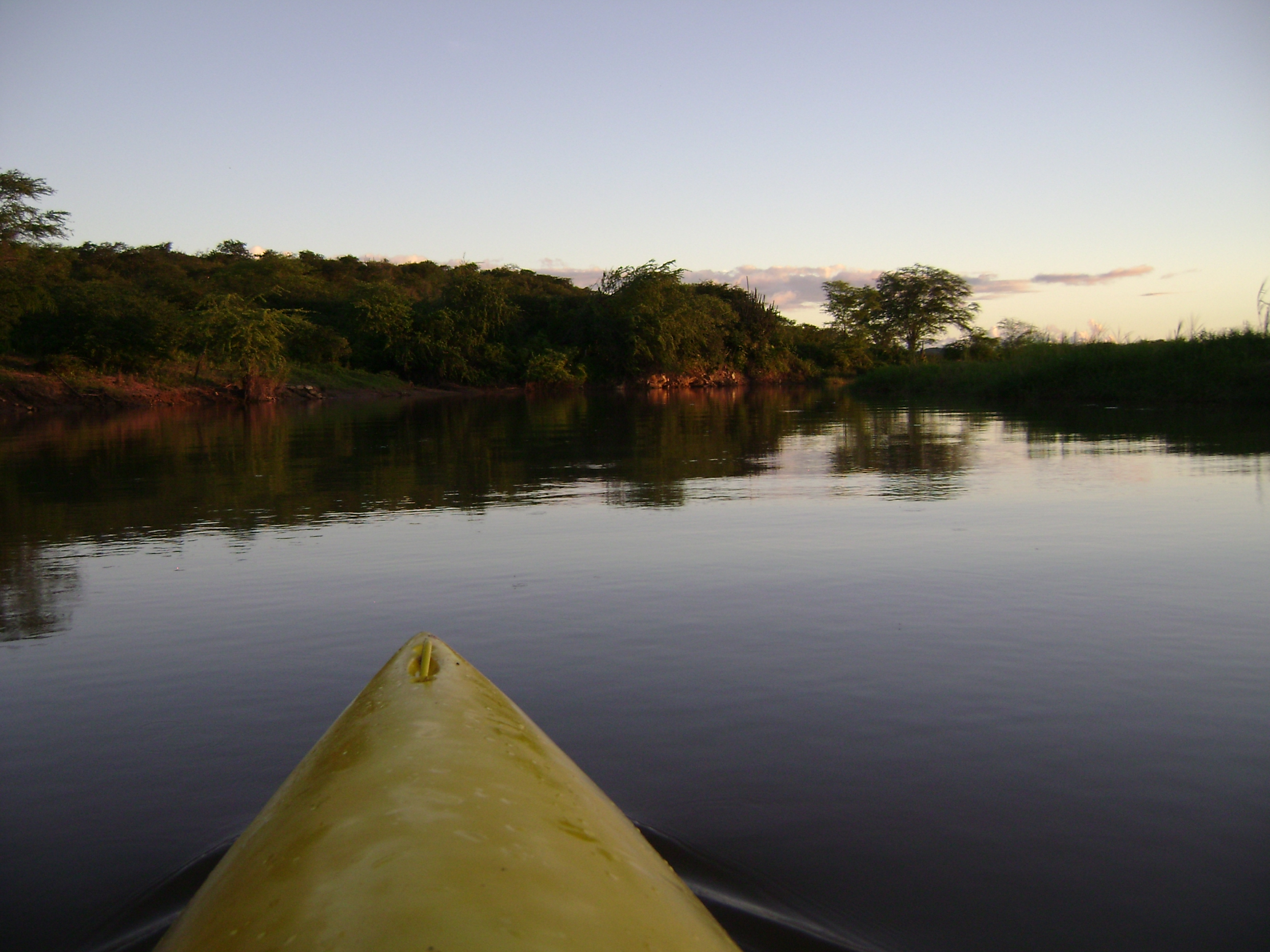

Location
- Country: Brazil

Physical characteristics
- Source
  - location: Rio Grande do Norte state

The Trairi River is a river of Rio Grande do Norte state in northeastern Brazil.

The river basin contains the Nísia Floresta National Forest, a 169 hectares (420 acres) sustainable use conservation unit created in 2001.

== See also ==
- List of rivers of Rio Grande do Norte
