= Acauã River =

Location
- Country: Brazil

Physical characteristics
- Source
  - location: Rio Grande do Norte state
- Mouth
  - coordinates: 6°32′18″S 36°49′49″W

The Acauã River is a river of Rio Grande do Norte state in northeastern Brazil.

== See also ==
- List of rivers of Rio Grande do Norte
