= Sabugi River =

Coordinates: 6°25′38″S 37°08′33″W

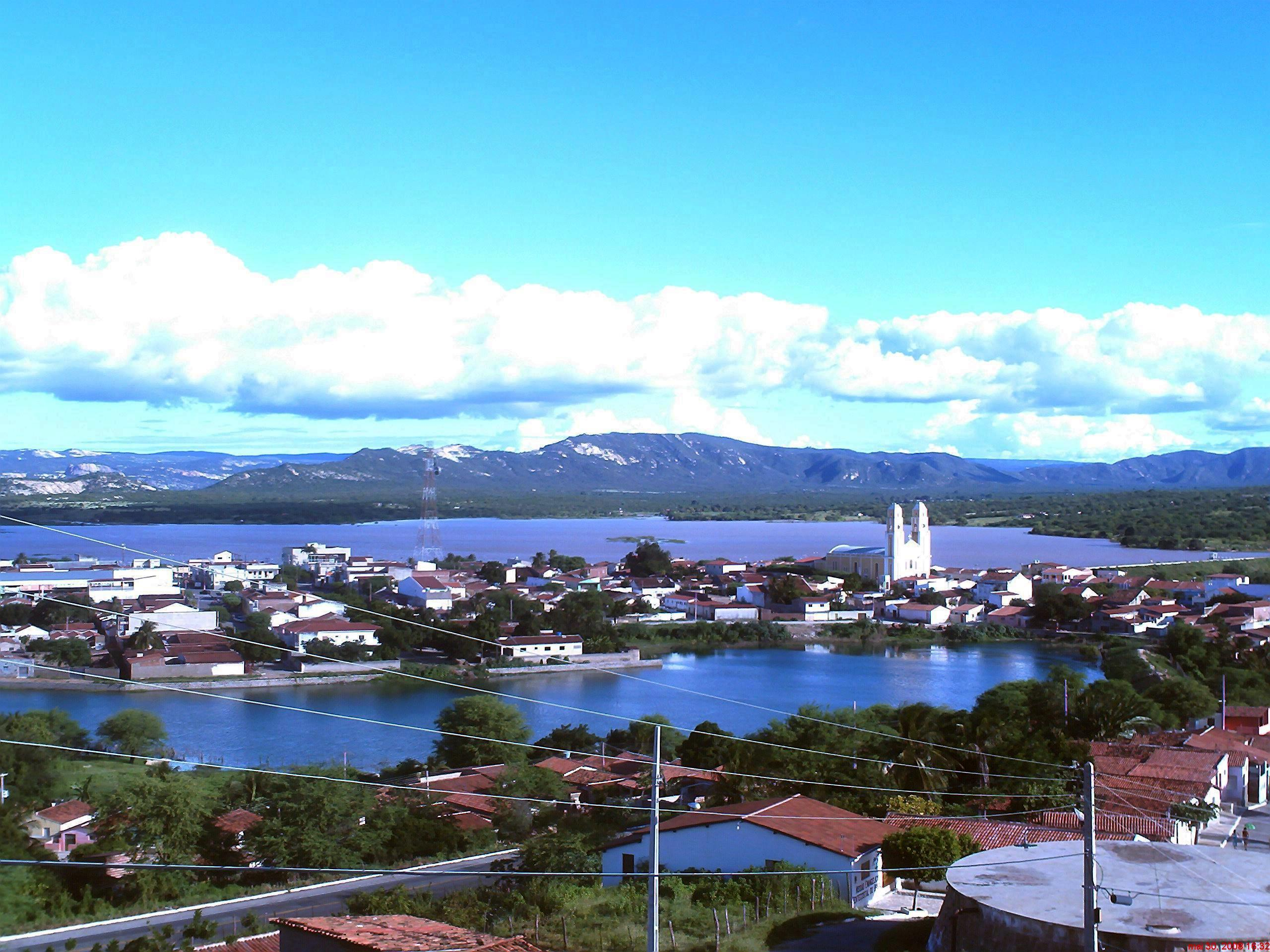

- Location within Brazil

Location
- Country: Brazil

Physical characteristics
- Source
  - location: Paraíba state
- Mouth
  - location: Rio Grande do Norte state

The Sabugi River is a river of Paraíba and Rio Grande do Norte states in northeastern Brazil.

== See also ==
- List of rivers of Paraíba
- List of rivers of Rio Grande do Norte
