= Maxaranguape River =

Coordinates: 5°31′12″S 35°15′13″W

Location
- Country: Brazil

Physical characteristics
- Source
  - location: 5°28'03.7"S, 35°33'14.9"W
  - elevation: 36m
- Mouth
  - location: 5°31'12.6"S, 35°15'12.7"W
  - elevation: 0m

The Maxaranguape River is a river of Rio Grande do Norte state in northeastern Brazil.

== See also ==
- List of rivers of Rio Grande do Norte
