= List of rivers of Rio Grande do Norte =

List of rivers in Rio Grande do Norte (Brazilian State).

The list is arranged by drainage basin from east to west, with respective tributaries indented under each larger stream's name and ordered from downstream to upstream. All rivers in Rio Grande do Norte drain to the Atlantic Ocean.

== By Drainage Basin ==
- Guaju River
- Cunaú River
  - Curimataú River
    - Calabouço River
- Catu River
- Jacu River (Japi River)
- Trairi River
  - Baldum River
- Cajupiranga River
  - Canto River
  - Pitimbu River
- Potengi River (Potenji River, Rio Grande do Norte)
  - Jundiaí River
- Doce River
- Ceará-Mirim River
- Maxaranguape River
- Punaú River
- Piranhas River (Açu River)
  - Salgado River (Amargoso River)
  - Pataxós River
  - Paraú River
  - Bodó River
  - Seridó River
    - Sabugi River
    - Acauã River
      - Currais Novos River
  - Espinharas River
- Dos Cavalos River (also a Piranhas River distributary)
  - Umbuzerio River
- Apodi River
  - Do Carmo River
    - Upanema River
  - Umari River

== Alphabetically ==
- Acauã River
- Apodi River
- Baldum River
- Bodó River
- Cajupiranga River
- Calabouço River
- Canto River
- Do Carmo River
- Catu River
- Dos Cavalos River
- Ceará-Mirim River
- Cunaú River
- Curimataú River
- Currais Novos River
- Doce River
- Espinharas River
- Guaju River
- Jacu River (Japi River)
- Jundiaí River
- Maxaranguape River
- Paraú River
- Pataxós River
- Piranhas River (Açu River)
- Pitimbu River
- Potengi River (Potenji River, Rio Grande do Norte)
- Punaú River
- Sabugi River
- Salgado River (Amargoso River)
- Seridó River
- Trairi River
- Umari River
- Umbuzerio River
- Upanema River
