= Araruna, Paraíba =

Coordinates: 6.55778°S 35.7419°W

Araruna
- Municipality
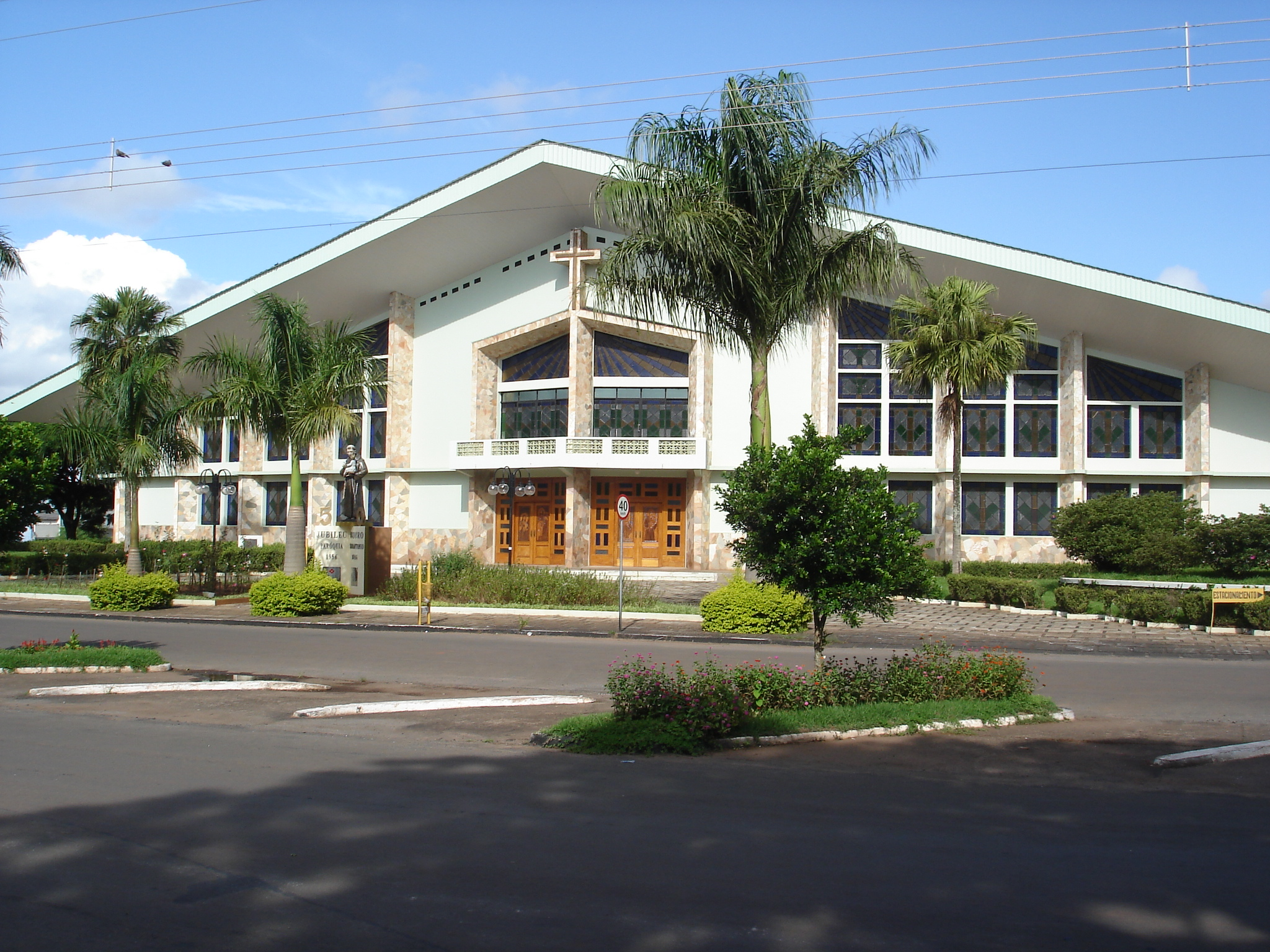

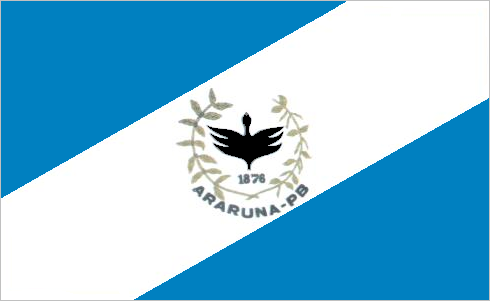
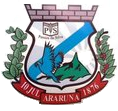
- Flag Coat of arms
- Interactive map of Araruna
- Country: Brazil
- Region: Northeast
- State: Paraíba
- Mesoregion: Agreste Paraibano

Population (2020)
  - Total: 20,463
- Time zone: UTC−3 (BRT)

Araruna (Central northeastern portuguese pronunciation: [ɐɾɐˈɾunɐ]) is a municipality in the state of Paraíba in the Northeast Region of Brazil.

The municipality contains the 157 hectares (390 acres) Pedra da Boca State Park, created in 2000 to protect an unusual set of rocky outcrops.

== See also ==
- List of municipalities in Paraíba
