= Bodo (surname) =

Bodo is a surname. Notable people with the surname include:

- Agnès Firmin-Le Bodo (born 1968), French politician
- Baoringdao Bodo (born 1999), Indian footballer
- Bodo (painter) (born Camille-Pierre Pambu Bodo, 1953–2015), painter from the Democratic Republic of Congo
- Eugeniusz Bodo (1899–1943), Polish actor and director
- Gheorghe Bodo (1923–2004), Romanian footballer
- Ki Joko Bodo (1964–2022), Indonesian actor
- Leudinus Bodo, seventh-century bishop of Toul
- Peter Bodo (born 1949), Austrian-born American sportswriter and author
- Richárd Bodó (born 1993), Hungarian handballer
- Sándor Bodó, Hungarian politician
- Yaakov Bodo (born 1931), Israeli actor
