= Punaú River =

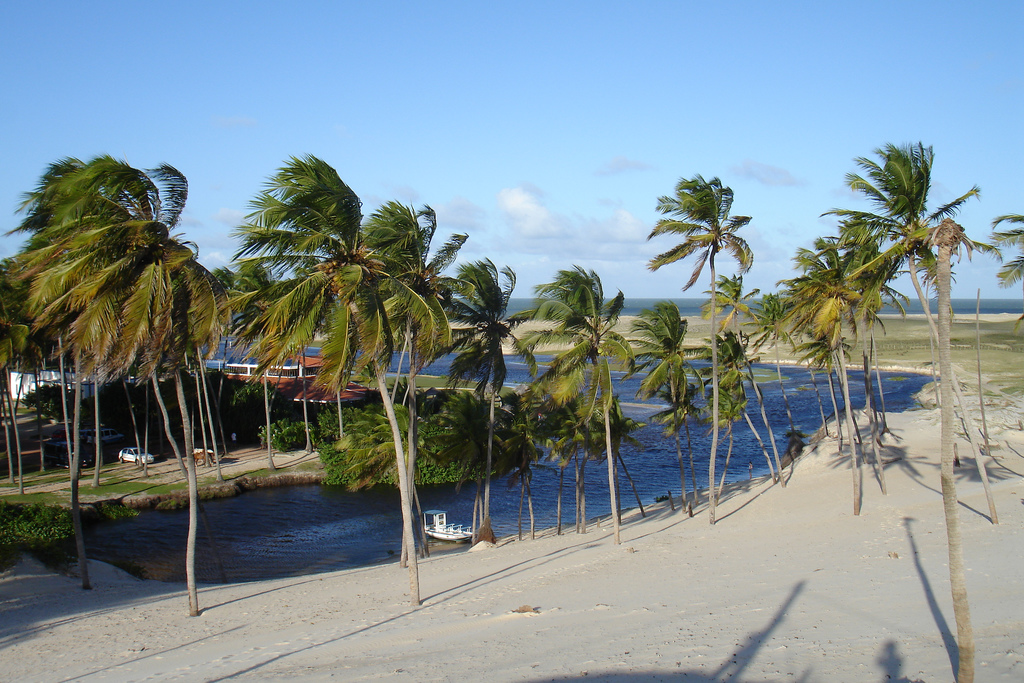

Location
- Country: Brazil

Physical characteristics
- Source
  - location: 5°24'03.6"S 35°29'42.1"W
- Mouth
  - location: 5°20'51.7"S 35°23'41.6"W

The Punaú River is a river of Rio Grande do Norte state in northeastern Brazil.

== See also ==
- List of rivers of Rio Grande do Norte
