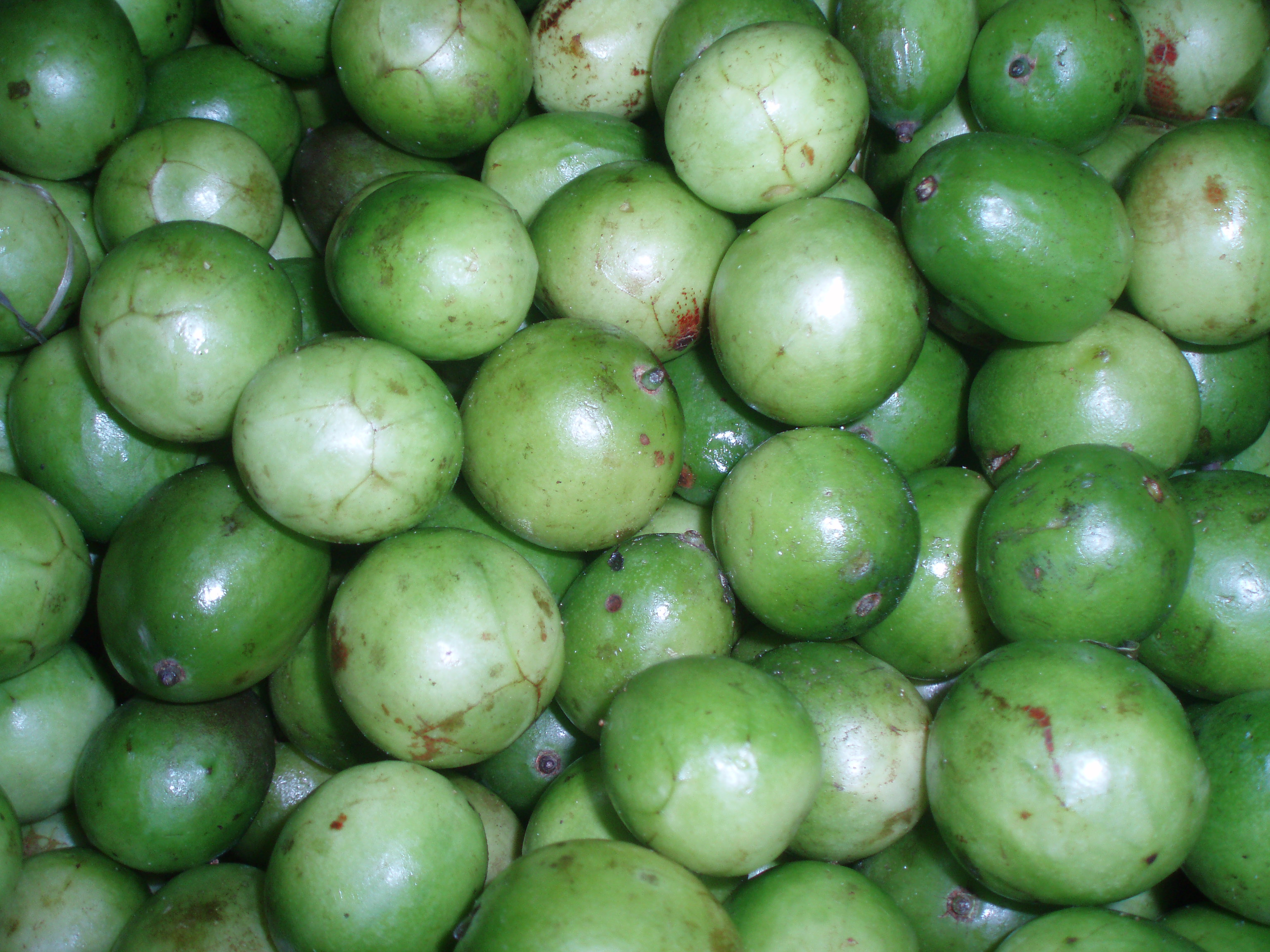

Scientific classification
- Kingdom: Plantae
- Clade: Tracheophytes
- Clade: Angiosperms
- Clade: Eudicots
- Clade: Rosids
- Order: Sapindales
- Family: Anacardiaceae
- Genus: Spondias
- Species: S. tuberosa

Binomial name
- Spondias tuberosa Arruda

= Spondias tuberosa =

Species of tree

Spondias tuberosa, commonly known as imbu, Portuguese pronunciation: [ũˈbu], [ĩˈbu] Brazil plum, or umbu, is a plant native to northeast Brazil, where it grows in the Caatinga, the chaparral scrub that grows wild across dry lands. The round fruit is light yellow to red, around 2–4 cm in size, and has a leathery shell. The flesh is soft and juicy, with a sweet taste and distinct aroma. The fruit comes from a small tree, seldom higher than 6 m, with an expansive crown that can reach 10 m in diameter. The fruit of the imbu are round and can be of varying size: they can be as small as cherries or as large as lemons. The peel is smooth and green or yellow when the fruit ripen, the small firm fruits are juicy and flavorful and their succulent flesh hides a large dark pit.

== Etymology ==
The name of this tree and fruit comes from the Tupi. The productive cycle of this wild, spontaneously growing tree begins after ten years of growth. It bears fruit once a year and can produce up to 300 kilos of fruit in a single harvest when it reaches maturity. Due to its robust root system, a great network of tubers that can store liquid throughout the dry summer season, the imbu tree can hold up to 3,000 liters of water during the dry months.

== Uses ==
This tree is an important resource for one of the driest regions of Brazil, where local agriculture is based on corn, beans and palma. The fruit of the imbu tree is collected by hand gently, as it is easily damaged and during picking the fruits are set in baskets and bags (in the past these fruits were also collected by beating the branches with long poles, to the detriment of their flavor).

== Cooking and jam ==
The imbu can be eaten fresh or made into jams or other sweetened preserves like fruit cheese. In the Sertão, it is cooked down until the peel and the pulp separate. Then, the liquid is poured off, it is mixed with sugar and cooked for another two hours. After the pulp has been reduced to a glossy gelatin (called geléia), it retains a slightly astringent flavor. In addition to the thick paste made by this long, slow boiling process, the imbu is the base of fruit juice, vinagre (the juice pressed from overripe fruit), and jam (made by pressing together layers of dried imbu paste). Another delicacy is the compôte made by mixing the fruit and sugar together in jars. The fresh pulp, or if the fresh fruit is not in season, the vinagre is mixed with milk and sugar to make umbuzada, a rich beverage that is a common substitute for a full meal. The fruit is ideal for mixing with gooseberries or plums and is used in fruit juices, jams and sorbets.

== Development ==
Until a few years ago, no one paid much attention to this fruit. But the work of various organizations (the NGO IRPAA/PRO CUC, the KMB, the Austrian Lins diocese, and Austrian Horizon 3000) has improved the profile of imbu. These groups have worked to improve the public reputation of Caatinga products and have followed the development of the COOPER-CUC cooperative, which produces products that have no added flavors or colors in a small workshop in Uauá in the state of Bahia. The Presidium will draw up a production protocol that ensures the artisan quality of the products made from these fruits and raises the profile of the products on the national and international markets. The objectives extend beyond the improvement of the market for on-farm products to include the development of new work opportunities and new income, the protection of the environment, and the organizational potential of the local population, with a focus on jobs for women.
