= Calabouço River =

Coordinates: 6°28′40″S 35°26′31″W

Location
- Country: Brazil

Physical characteristics
- Source
  - location: Paraíba state
- Mouth
  - location: Rio Grande do Norte state

The Calabouço River is a river of Paraíba and Rio Grande do Norte states in eastern Brazil.

== See also ==
- List of rivers of Rio Grande do Norte
- List of rivers of Paraíba
