= Bodorova =

Bodorova may refer to:

- the Slovak village Bodorová
- the composer Sylvie Bodorová.
