= Boro language =

Boro language may refer to:

- Boro language (India), a Tibeto-Burman language spoken in Assam, India
- Boro language (Ghana), an extinct and unclassified language of Ghana
- Boro language (Ethiopia), an Omotic language of Ethiopia
