= Bodo blouse =

Sheer and transparent women blouse of South Sulawesi, Indonesia

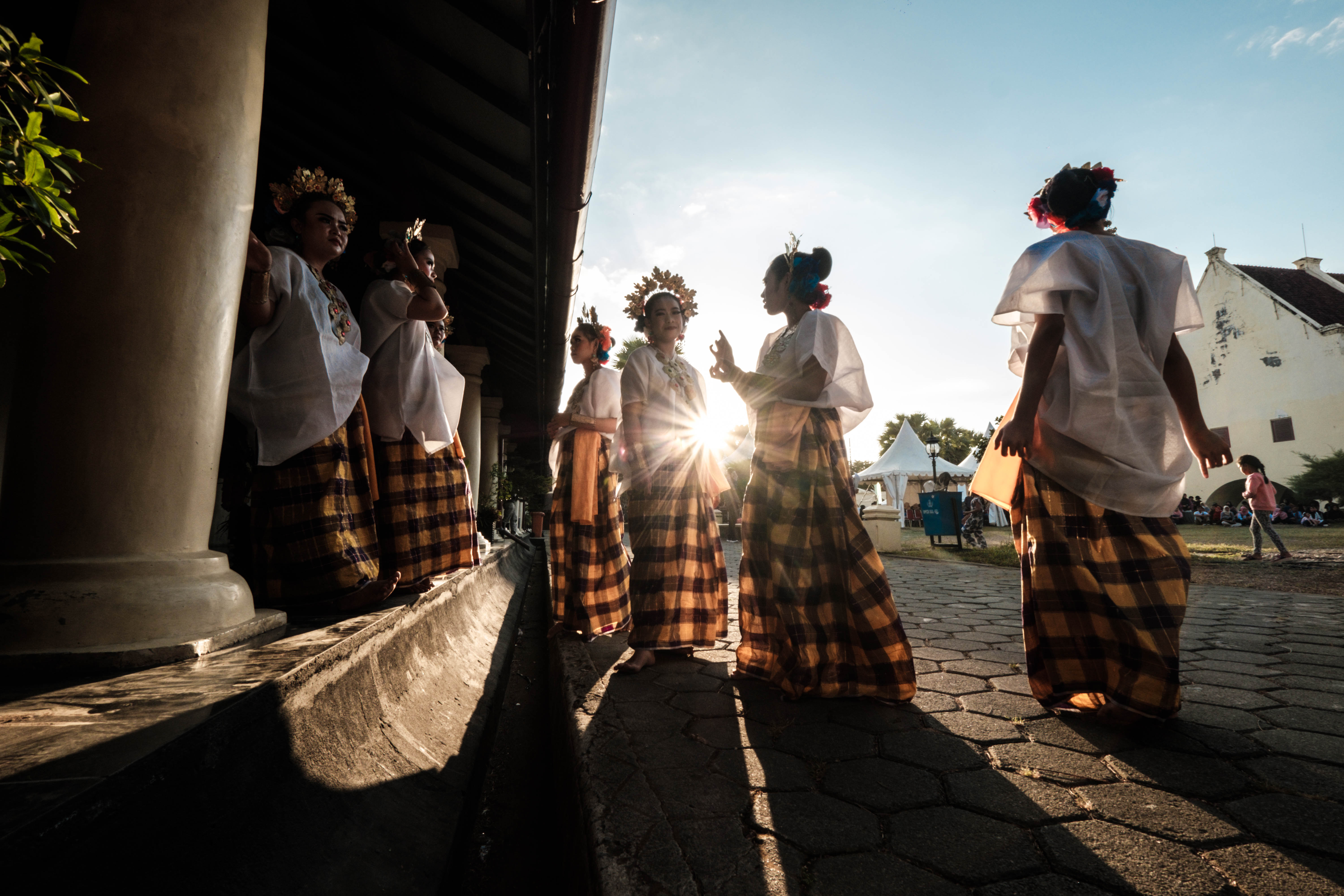
- Girls wearing baju bodo or bodo blouse, worn with woven sarong.
- Type: Traditional blouse-dress
- Material: Muslin, sheer cotton, silk
- Place of origin: South Sulawesi, Indonesia
- Manufacturer: Buginese and Makassarese

The bodo blouse, locally known as baju bodo (Buginese: ᨓᨍᨘ ᨄᨚᨏᨚ, romanized: waju ponco), is a sheer and transparent short-sleeved loose blouse, a traditional attire for women of the Bugis and Makassar peoples of South Sulawesi, Indonesia. A bodo blouse is traditionally combined with a matching woven sarong that covered the waist below the body.

== Attire components ==
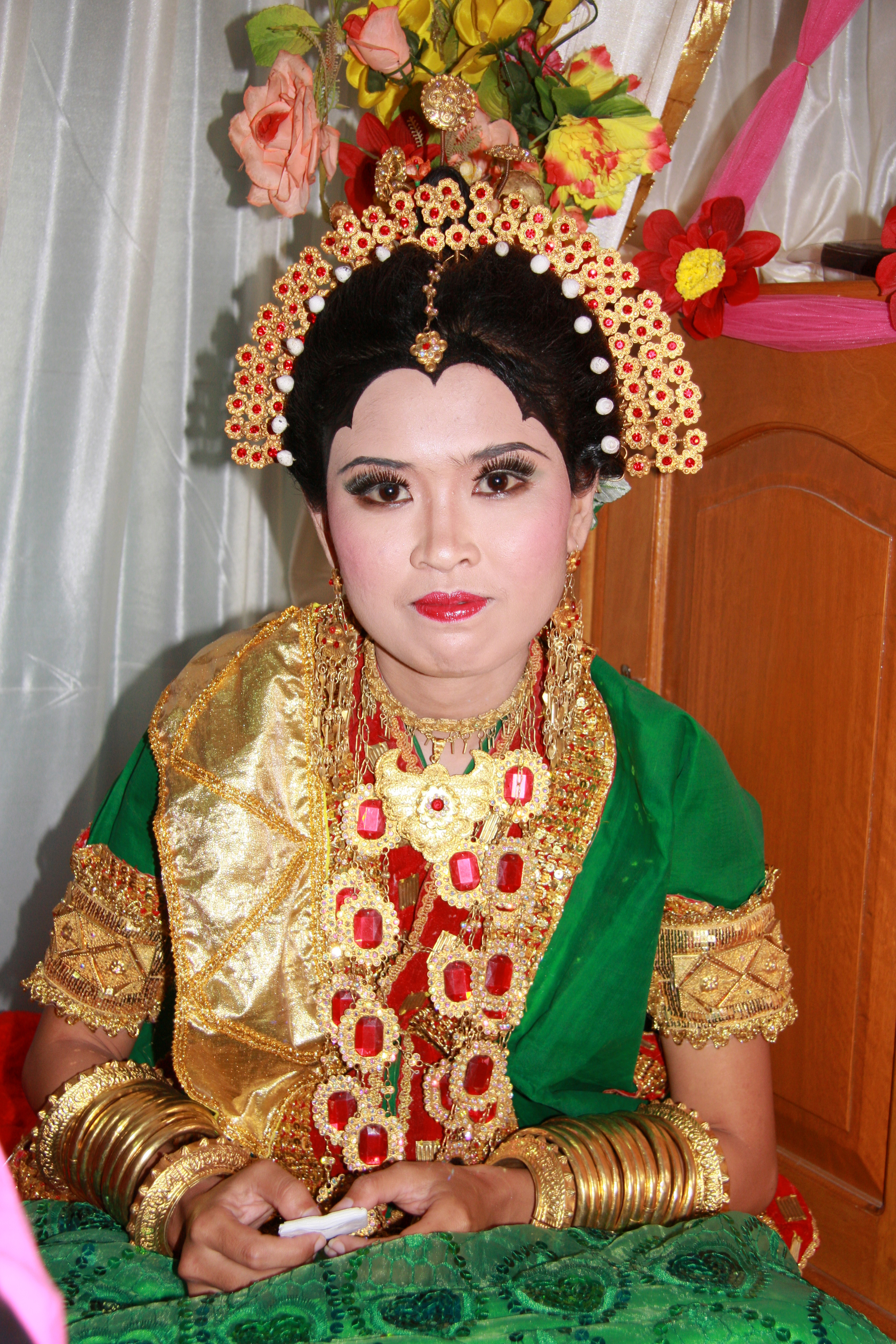
A Bugis bride wearing an elaborate bodo blouse, completed with intricate hairdo and jewelries.

=== Blouse ===
The textile materials used in bodo blouse are usually thin, sheer and transparent; usually muslin, sheer cotton or silk. Muslin is the most favoured materials, it has loose threads that make it look transparent and suitable for hot and humid tropical climate.

As the name implies, the term bodo in the Makassar language means "short", which imply that this blouse is indeed short-sleeved. The cut of bodo blouse is quite simple, it follows the square design with holes or openings for the neck, two arms and waist. Some designs might have a front opening; others do not which can resemble a loose tube. It is also quite loose to allow the blouse to fit all sizes, and the design highlights the drape quality of the sheer fabrics.

=== Sarong ===
Bodo blouse is traditionally combined with a matching woven sarong that covered the waist. Commonly, Makassarese people wore sarong wrapped around quite tightly. However, in this outfit the sarong is deliberately fitted loosely to match the loose draped shape of the bodo blouse top.

=== Jewelry ===
This traditional clothing is considered incomplete if not complemented by jewelry or accessories. Some of these accessories includes earrings, headbands, tiaras, tiered necklaces, long necklaces, wide bracelets, multiple thin keroncong type bracelets and metal belts. The accessories mentioned above are the complete variants which are commonly used by brides. Common guests usually wear less jewelry. This jewelry is usually made of gold or silver, while the simpler ones are made of brass.

== History ==
The sheer woven cotton as the materials of bodo blouse is believed has been made and used by people in Sulawesi since the 9th century. In the past, bodo blouses were worn without undergarments, exposing the breasts and curves of the wearer. However, after the local Bugis and Makassar people converted to Islam in past centuries, previously revealing clothing was subdued to be more modest. This transparent outfit was then paired with an undergarment of the same colour, but usually lighter in tone.

== Usage ==
This traditional clothing is often worn for traditional events, such as wedding ceremonies. Although it has been increasingly marginalised due to the influence of modern clothing, or competing with other Indonesian national attires such as kebaya and baju kurung, it remains prevalent in traditional Bugis villages. The bodo blouses are still worn by Bugis women, especially by brides during the marriage ceremony and wedding reception, as well as by the mother of the bride and groom, and the maid of honour.

Lately, the use of the bodo blouse has begun to expand for various activities, such as dancing and singing. Today, bodo blouse has become a source of inspiration for contemporary Indonesian fashion designers, and used as the inspiration of modern wedding dress.

== Colours ==
=== Traditional ===
According to Bugis customs and traditions, specific colours of bodo blouse worn by Bugis women indicates the age and social standings of the wearer.

Colours	Meanings
Orange	Worn by female children aged 10 years old or younger.
Orange or red	Worn by girls aged between 10 and 16 years old.
Red	Worn by maidens aged between 17 and 25 years old.
White	Worn by dayang attendants, ritual dancers, brides, or female dukuns (witch doctors)
Green	Worn by noble women.
Purple	Worn by widows.

=== Contemporary ===
In contemporary Bugis culture, the traditional significance attached to specific colors in the bodo blouse, which once denoted age and social status, has undergone a transformation. Unlike the strict guidelines adhered to in earlier times, modern practices no longer confine individuals to particular colors based on their age or rank. As a result, women now have the freedom to select from a wider range of colors, including those historically associated with specific age groups.

Furthermore, modern Bugis attire embraces an expansive array of hues beyond the traditional spectrum. Colors like blue, mauve, and orange have become prominent in contemporary Bugis textiles. Historical records from the Leiden Museum even indicate the presence of blue and mauve-toned blouses as far back as 1864, initially linked with nobility before becoming accessible to a broader audience. Today, individuals from all backgrounds, including brides, can confidently choose a green baju bodo, an option that was once reserved solely for noblewomen. This evolution signifies a more inclusive and adaptable approach to Bugis fashion, departing from the strict conventions of the past.

== Gallery ==
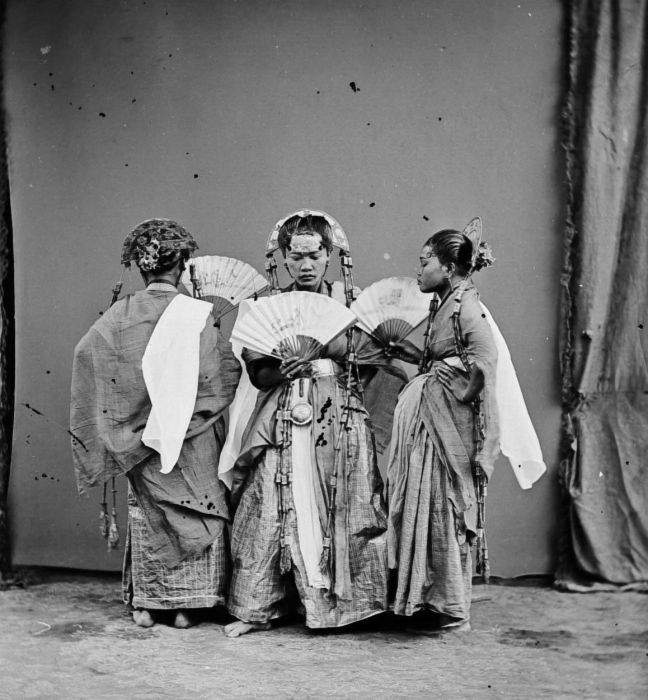
Pajoge dancers wearing bodo blouse, Maros circa 1870

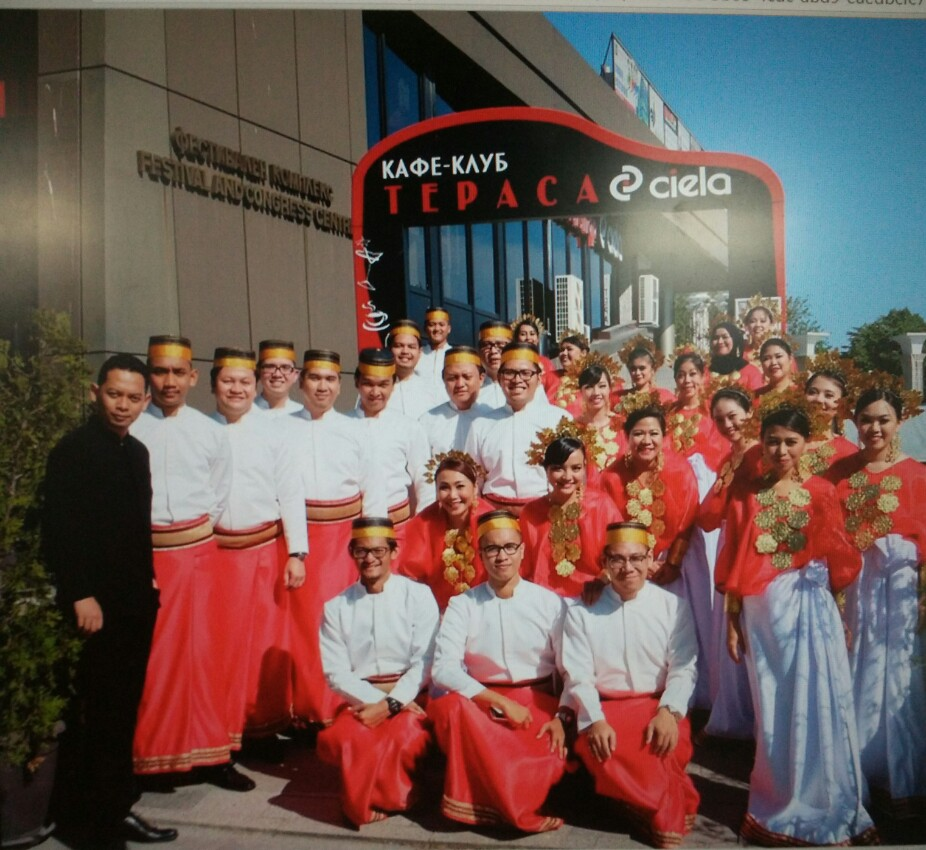
Indonesian choir group wearing Bugis traditional attires, the ladies wearing bodo blouse

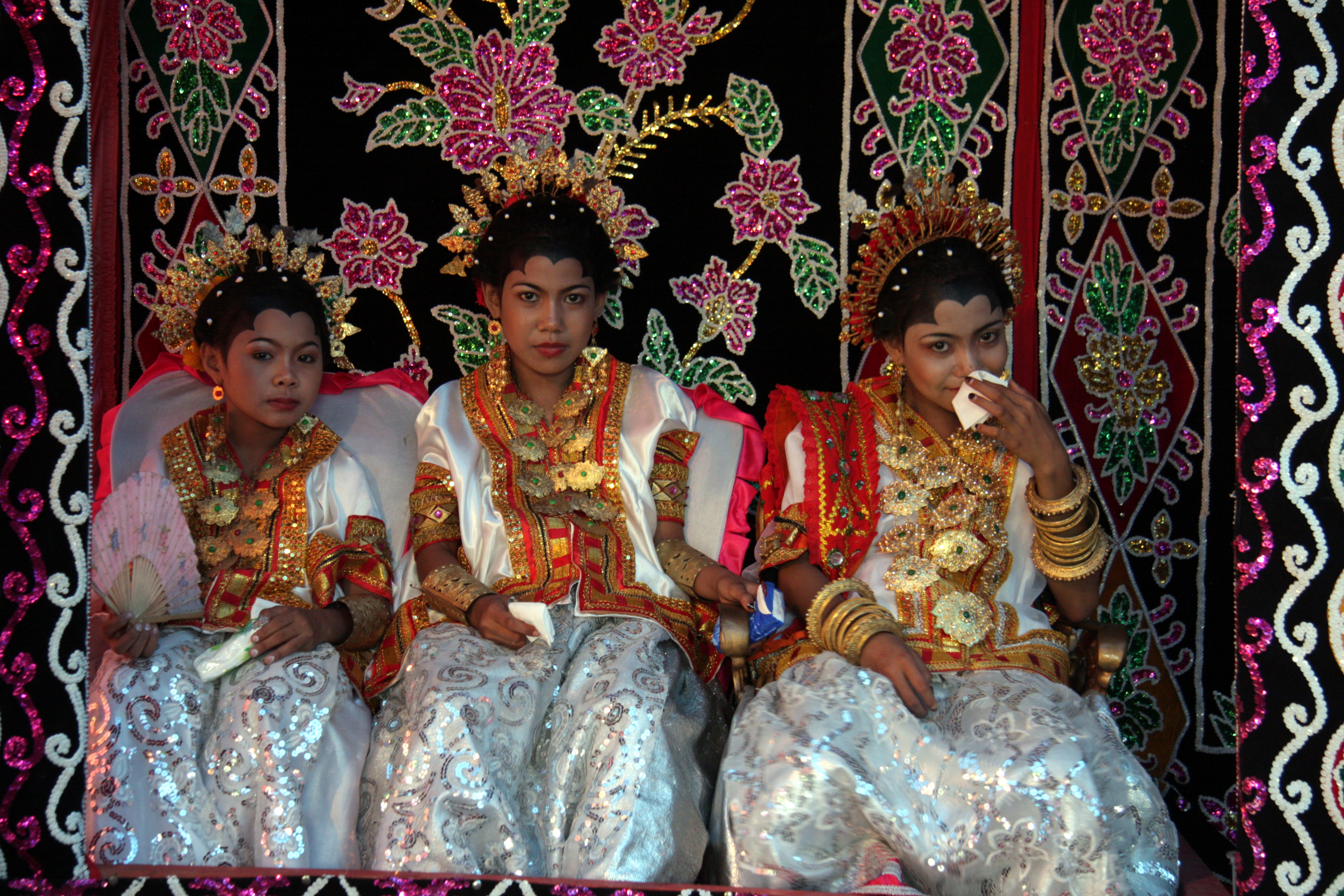
Bugis girls wearing bodo blouse

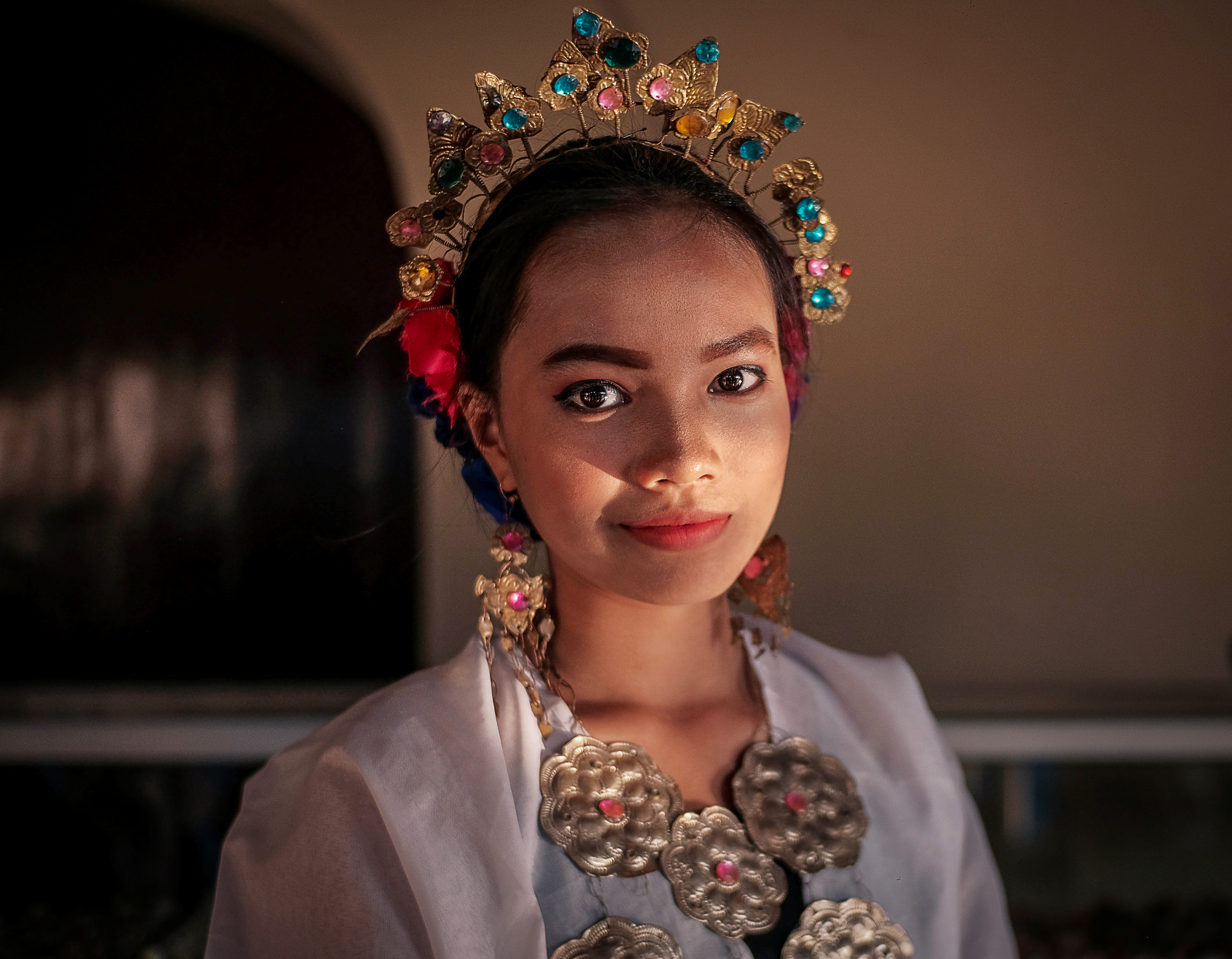
A girl wearing bodo blouse with jewelries; headbands, earrings and necklace

== See also ==
- Kebaya
- Baju kurung
- National costume of Indonesia
