= Boro (surname) =

- Pronunciation: Bo-ro

Origin
- Language: Boro
- Meaning: Great
- Region of origin: Assam, India

Other names
- Variant forms: Baro, Borosa, Bodo

Boro is a surname used by Boro people. Boro means "great people." Bodo, Baro and Bara are variants of the name.

Notable people with the surname include:

- Jamuna Boro, Indian boxer
- Durga Boro, Indian footballer
- Ankushita Boro, Indian boxer
