= Catu River =

Location
- Country: Brazil

Physical characteristics
- Source
  - location: Rio Grande do Norte state
- Mouth: Atlantic Ocean
  - coordinates: 6°17′06″S 35°02′04″W

The Catu River is a river of Rio Grande do Norte state in northeastern Brazil.

== See also ==
- List of rivers of Rio Grande do Norte
