= Borro Private Finance =

UK based personal asset finance company

Borro
- Type: Private Listed
- Industry: Financial services
- Founded: August 2008
- Headquarters: Denver, United States
- Key people: Dewey Burke, CEO
- Services: Secured loans, luxury asset loans, collateral loans
- Number of employees: 15 (2020)
- Website: www.borro.com

Borro (previously known as Borro Private Finance) is a US-based online pawnbroker and secured lender that offers loans secured on luxury assets. The company provides loans allowing clients to use luxury assets such as fine art, classic cars, jewelry, watches and other collectibles.

== History ==
Borro became a subsidiary of the privately held finance company Luxury Asset Capital in February, 2020 upon its acquisition from Victory Park Capital. Borro was first funded by European Founders and partners Eden Ventures . In 2011 the asset lender received two sets of funding.

In March 2014 Borro Private Finance raised $112,000,000 from Victory Park Capital. In February 2015, Borro Private Finance raised an additional $19,500,000 in funding. This round pushed Borro Private Finance's total capital raised to over $200,000,000.

In November 2017, Victory Park Capital took a majority stake in Borro Private Finance, expanding its involvement to also include working capital financing along with strategic and operational support.

Borro became Borro Private Finance in July 2018 and its name reverted to simply Borro upon its acquisition by Luxury Asset Capital in February, 2020.

== Services ==
Borro Private Finance was lauded as the UK's first ever online luxury asset lender. Soon after launch the company's advertising campaign commenced on television, aimed at the daytime audience and those seeking to take "discreet" loans online. Credit Today named Borro Private Finance Alternative Lender of the Year in 2011 and 2012.

The success of Borro Private Finance and the other newly established online loan companies can be aligned to the worldwide economic decline of 2008–2010.

In its initial four months Borro Private Finance doubled its loan book every month, as a surge in business owners, developers, and City financiers attempted to secure loans on their luxury items gained in more wealthy times. By June 2011 it was reported in The Times that Borro Private Finance conducted its first £1,000,000 loan.

On 4 July 2017 John Allbrook became CEO of Borro Private Finance, replacing Paul Aitken who stepped down from the role. Its current chief executive is Dewey Burke, the Founder and CEO of parent company Luxury Asset Capital.

== In the Media ==
Amidst the United Kingdom Parliamentary expenses scandal in 2009, Borro Private Finance offered any "struggling" MPs a loan at half the normal interest rates.

In June 2011 Borro Private Finance demonstrated why SME's are turning to short term lenders for cash as reported by the Financial Times.

At the beginning of 2012 The Daily Telegraph Business Club showed Borro Private Finance as a new alternative lender.

On launching in the US Reuters reported in February 2012 the increasing number of people using wine collections as security for loans, as Borro Private Finance lends $120,000 in exchange for 128 bottles of Chateau d'Yquem. Interest in the diverse range of assets used to secure finance with Borro Private Finance was also expressed by CNN Money in the article "Got a Picasso? Get a small business loan". highlighting the use of asset based loans by entrepreneurs and small businesses.

In October 2013 The Wall Street Journal showed that Borro Private Finance as a personal asset lender fills a lending void that was perhaps previously unavailable. In this particular report, Borro Private Finance had assisted an individual in releasing equity in a bronze nude torso sculpture.

The Mirror presented in December 2013 the variety of assets that Borro Private Finance have lent against. The article showed that Borro Private Finance has released equity in everything from Olympic gold medals to F1 cars and Oscars.

In February 2015, Borro Private Finance was featured on CNN's Out Front with Erin Burnett. The piece focused on the appeal of Borro Private Finance to the rich and famous.

In April 2015, The Times covered Borro Private Finance and interviewed Group Sales Director, Claire Barrington-Jones about how asset backed lending is on the rise despite the economy's recovery.
