= Bob Bodor =

American football coach

Playing career
- 1984–1987: Denison

Coaching career (HC unless noted)
- 1988–1990: Severn School (MD) (line)
- 1991: Johns Hopkins (DL)
- 1992–1993: Columbia (DL/DB/ST]
- 1994: Penn (OL/RB)
- 1995–1997: Hartwick (DC)
- 1998–2002: Albion (DC)
- 2003–2008: Colorado College
- 2012: RPI

Head coaching record
- Overall: 20–46

Bob Bodor is an American former college football coach. He was the senior member services manager for the United States Fencing Association. Bodor served as the head football coach at Colorado College from 2003 to 2008 and at Rensselaer Polytechnic Institute (RPI) in Troy, New York in 2012, compiling a career college football coaching record of 20–46.

== Head coaching record ==
Year	Team	Overall	Conference	Standing	Bowl/playoffs
Colorado College Tigers (NCAA Division III independent) (2003–2006)
2003	Colorado College	2–7			
2004	Colorado College	2–7			
2005	Colorado College	2–8			
2006	Colorado College	5–5			
Colorado College Tigers (Southern Collegiate Athletic Conference) (2007–2008)
2007	Colorado College	4–6	1–6	7th	
2008	Colorado College	0–9	0–7	8th	
Colorado College:		15–42	1–13		
RPI Engineers (Liberty League) (2012)
2012	RPI	5–4	3–4	T–4th	
RPI:		5–4	3–4		
Total:		20–46			
