= Tibor Bodor =

Hungarian actor

- Born: 11 February 1921; Kiskunhalas, Hungary
- Died: 20 July 2000 (aged 79); Budapest, Hungary
- Occupation: Actor
- Years active: 1941–2000

Tibor Bodor (11 February 1921 – 20 July 2000) was a Hungarian actor.

== Biography ==
Bodor was born in Kiskunhalas.

After finishing his studies at Academy of Drama and Film in Budapest, he worked for the Theatre of the Town in Szeged.

In 1942 he moved to Miskolc.

He was a prisoner of war, but he continued the performances. He played at National Theatre of Pécs from 1948, at Madách Theatre from 1949. After 1956 he worked at National Theatre. He was a very well-recognised recitator. He taught it at his alma mater in 1951–1952 and after 1957. He played at television series as well. He figured comrade Kenész, leader of the printing-house in the Szomszédok telenovel. He was regarded as the actor with the nicest voice. He was granted to a freeman of Kiskunhalas in 1987.
