= Eddie Boros =

- Born: November 27, 1932; New York City, New York
- Died: April 27, 2007 (aged 74); New York City
- Occupation: Artist

Eddie Boros (November 27, 1932 – April 27, 2007) was an American artist, known primarily for building the Tower of Toys in a community garden in Manhattan's East Village.

== Biography ==
Boros was born in New York on November 27, 1932, the middle son of two Hungarian immigrants, a house painter and a seamstress. He grew up in the same apartment he was living in when he died.

Boros served in the U.S. Army during the Korean War, but because of his pacifism he was assigned to tree planting.

He began building his tower out of scrap wood in 1985 after installing wood sculptures randomly around the community garden. He was asked by other community gardeners to restrict his installations to his own plot. In 1994 a documentary about the tower premiered on PBS television stations. Over time, the tower grew to a height of 65 feet and was covered with a variety of toys. The tower appeared in the opening credits for the television show NYPD Blue and also appeared in the musical RENT.

Boros died at the age of 74 while recuperating from having both legs amputated above the knee. He died at Mary Immaculate Hospital after his relatives allegedly found him to be malnourished at the VA hospital he had been sent to in St. Albans, Queens.

Part of the 12th Annual Lower East Side Festival for the Arts was dedicated to Boros' memory.
