= Lilla Bodor =

Hungarian artist (born 1979)

Lilla Bodor (born 1979) is a Hungarian painter.

The artist presents the spaces of our lives filtered by a real convex mirror and the curved mirror of her imagination as well. Two of the capital features of Lilla Bodor’s creating practice, the usage of tondo – the round picture formats, and the bending of the painted spaces, figures, objects.

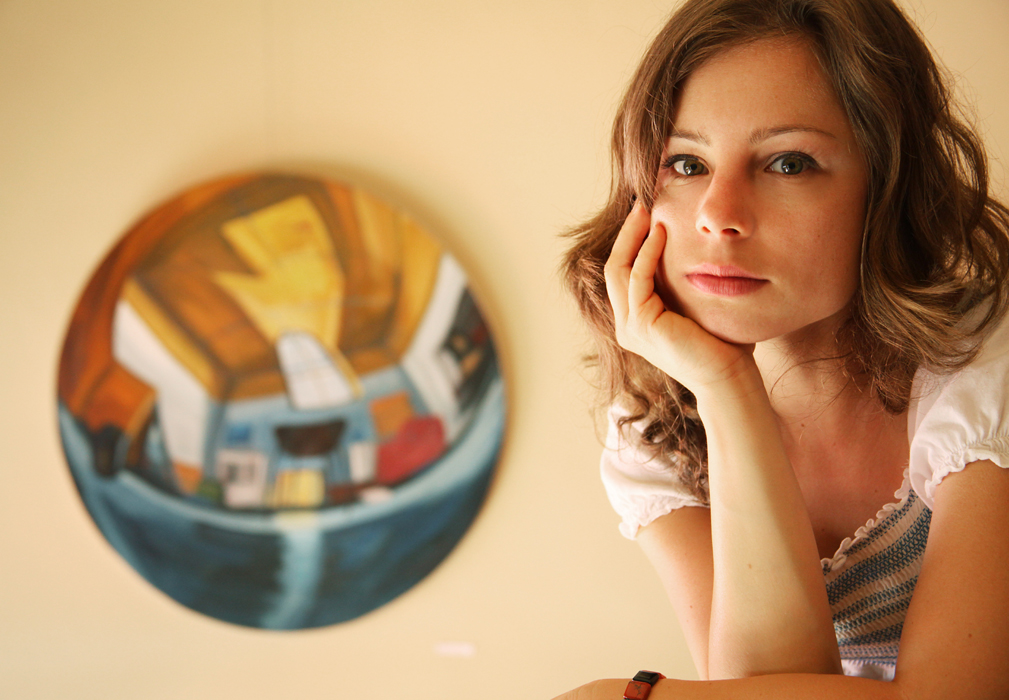
Bodor portrait

== About Lilla Bodor's paintings ==
The main topics of the paintings depicting the reflections are mostly inner spaces and female figures. She reflects the world in a convex mirror and she further interprets this view in the arrangement and painting of her pictures.

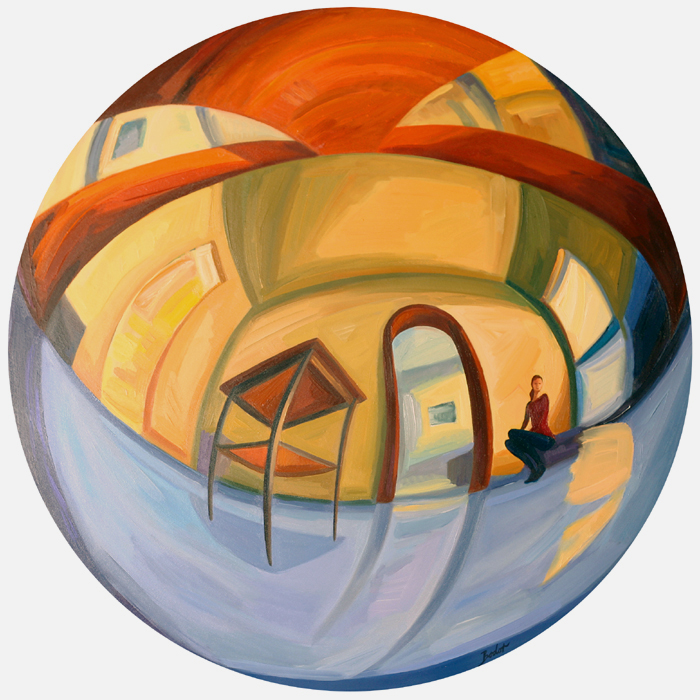
Little woman in big room (1)

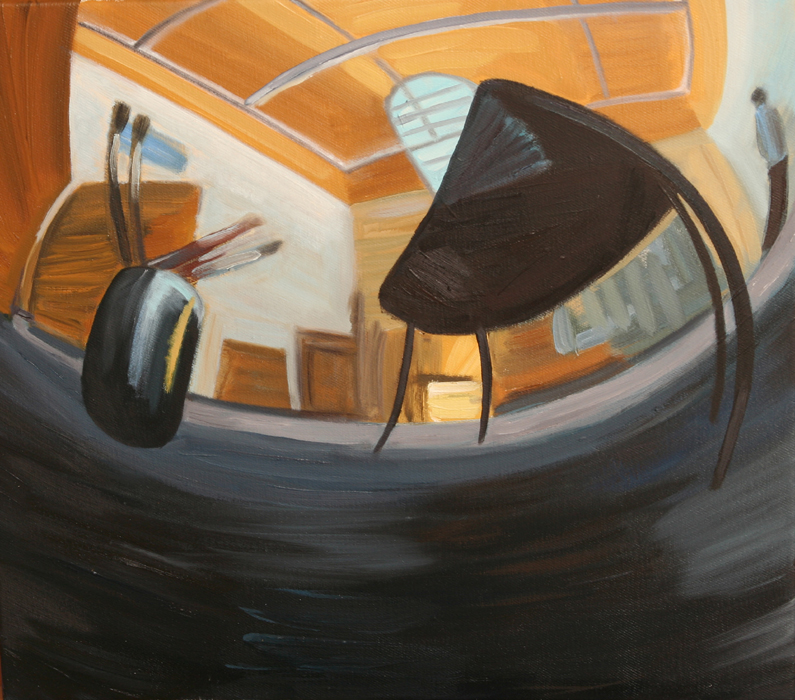
Small studio (2)

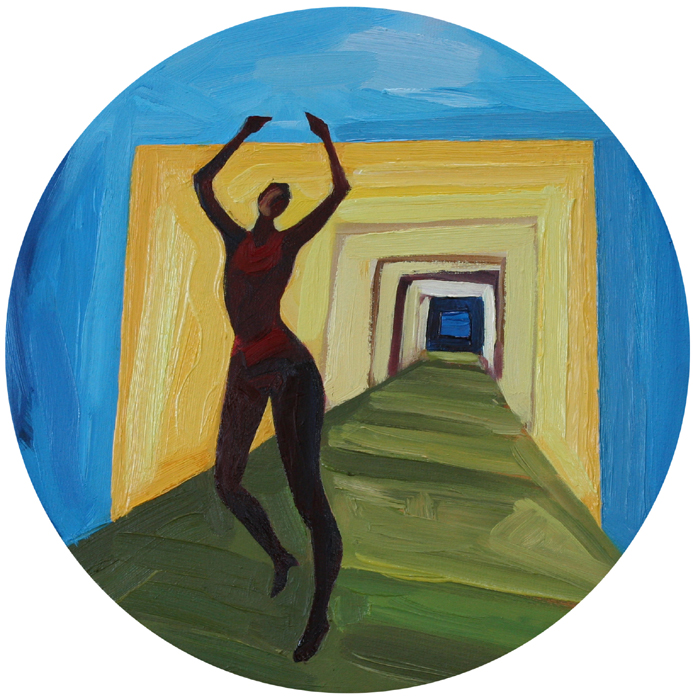
Arrival of Paolina Carapina (3)

== Education ==
- 2001–2007 Hungarian University of Fine Arts, Budapest
- 2006 Erasmus Scholarship at Edinburgh College of Art.

== Social memberships ==
- National Association of Hungarian Creative Artists (member, 2007-).

== Awards ==
- 2007 Béla Gruber Award.

== Selected exhibitions ==
- 2002 Language of colours. Hungarian University of Fine Arts, Budapest;
- 2005 Undersized. Group exhibition. Várfok Gallery, Budapest;
- 2005 Solo exhibition. Lukács Confectionery, Budapest;
- 2006 Dance of Life. Solo exhibition. Bartók Theatre and House of Art, Dunaújváros;
- 2007 Best of Diploma 2007. Barcsay Hall Hungarian University of Fine Arts, Budapest;
- 2007 Fresh Europe 2007. Group exhibition. KOGART House, Budapest;
- 2008 Budapest Art Expo Fresh. International Biennial of Young Artists, ArtMill, Szentendre;
- 2008 Tradition of the City. NetAktív Gallery, Budapest;
- 2008 55. Autumn Exhibition at Vásárhely. János Tornyai Museum, Hódmezővásárhely;
- 2008 Propos d’Europe 7.0. Paris-Fehérvárcsurgó Károlyi castle, Fehérvárcsurgó;
- 2008 Szalmaszál Foundation Charity Auction. Centrális Gallery CEU, Budapest;
- 2009 Solo exhibition. Madách Theatre, Budapest;
- 2009 II Munkácsy Collective exhibition. Volksbank Gallery Istenhegyi street, Budapest;
- 2009 Mood for Tondo. Solo exhibition. Ráday Volksbank Gallery, Budapest;
- 2010 What iF? Solo Exhibition. IF Jazz Café, Budapest.
