= Peter Bodo =

American journalist

Peter Bodo (born 19 June 1949) is an Austrian born American sportswriter and author, and Senior Editor/Blogger at Tennis Magazine. He is also an occasional columnist for the "Outdoor" section of The New York Times and for the Atlantic Salmon Journal. He won the WTA Tour Award for "Best Writer of the Year" twice, in 1979 and 1981.

== Literary style ==
According to Bodo, his writing style is based on the idea that absolute objectivity is impossible. He purports to feel that each of his opinions must be defended with "well-reasoned, if not provable or objective, 'truths.'" He also says that he has few "strong, personal" feelings about players and believes that most of his readers understand the "fun" present in his writing. However, some readers have noted that Bodo, despite his Austrian birth, has a strong and regularly repeated bias in favor of American tennis players, in favor of an American or "midwestern" lifestyle, and in favor of an American style of sports, as contrasted with European tennis players, European sports, and European mores.

He is also noted for his enthusiasm in promoting the sport of tennis, but he sees this enthusiasm as "the logical outcome" of his writing rather than being a "guiding principle".

Early influences on Bodo's journalistic writing style include Frank Deford, Curry Kirkpatrick, George Plimpton, Norman Mailer, Dave Anderson and Hunter S. Thompson.

== Personal life ==
Bodo was born in Austria to Hungarian parents and emigrated to the United States in 1953. He grew up in New York and New Jersey. Bodo attended the Catholic college, Seton Hall University (South Orange, NJ) in the late 1960s and early '70s. He is married with one son, Luke.

== Bibliography ==
=== Non-fiction ===
- Soccer; 1978
- Pelé's New World with David Hirshey; 1976
- Inside Tennis: A Season on the Pro Tour; 1979
- Rashad: Mikes, Vikes and a Little Something on the Back Side with Ahmad Rashad; 1985
- The Courts of Babylon: Tales of Greed and Glory From the Harsh New World of Professional Tennis; 1995
- The Atlantic Salmon Handbook; 1997
- Tennis for Dummies with Patrick McEnroe; 1998
- A Champion's Mind: Lessons From A Life In Tennis, with Pete Sampras (memoir); 2008
- Whitetail Nation: My Season in Pursuit of the Monster Buck; 2010
- Hardcourt Confidential; with Patrick McEnroe; 2010
- Ashe vs. Connors:Tennis That Went Beyond Centre Court; 2015

=== Fiction ===
- The Trout Whisperers (novel); 2006
