= Csongor Boros =

Serbian footballer

Personal information
- Full name: Csongor Boros
- Date of birth: 13 January 1997 (age 29)
- Place of birth: Bačka Topola, Yugoslavia
- Height: 1.72 m (5 ft 8 in)
- Position: Defensive midfielder

Youth career
- TSC

Senior career*
Years	Team	Apps	(Gls)
2015–2018	TSC	46	(1)
- * Club domestic league appearances and goals as of 17 September 2017

Csongor Boros (born 13 January 1997) is a Serbian footballer who plays as a defensive midfielder
